= List of medical colleges in Bangladesh =

In Bangladesh, a medical school is referred to as a medical college. Allopathic related medical education at the graduate level are provided by medical colleges. The colleges are under the jurisdiction of the Ministry of Health and Family Welfare (MoHFW), and are affiliated with a university in the respective region. They however have to be recognized after meeting a set criterion by a central regulatory authority called Bangladesh Medical and Dental Council (BM&DC).

All medical colleges until 1986 were established by the government. Currently, there are 37 public medical colleges, these provide 5100 seats every year for students undertaking MBBS. While the 68 private medical colleges provide 6040 seats. 7 colleges are run by Bangladesh Armed Forces which offer 425 seats.

All the medical colleges award the Bachelor of Medicine, Bachelor of Surgery (MBBS). The Doctor of Medicine (MD), Master of Surgery (MS) or Postgraduate Diploma is awarded as a postgraduate degree in selected medical colleges and universities, following the medical tradition of Commonwealth countries. As per the declaration of overseas registration of the General Medical Council, the awarded MBBS degree from some of the institutions are eligible to apply for registration in the United Kingdom.

== Public medical colleges ==
Number of medical colleges: 37
Total seats: 5100

- General seat : 4,794 (94% of total seat)
- Freedom Fighter Qouta : 255 (5% of total seat)
- Tribal Qouta : 51 (1% of total seat)

Public Medical college	Acronym	Affiliated University	Hospital established	College Started	Enroll.	Location	Division	Website
Dhaka Medical College	DMC	DU	1946	1946	225	Dhaka	Dhaka Division	link
Sir Salimullah Medical College	SSMC	DU	1858	1972	225	Dhaka	Dhaka Division	link
Shaheed Suhrawardy Medical College	ShSMC	DU	1963	2006	225	Dhaka	Dhaka Division	link
Chittagong Medical College	CMC	CMU	1927	1957	225	Chattogram	Chattogram Division	link
Rajshahi Medical College	RMC	RMU	1954	1958	225	Rajshahi	Rajshahi Division	link
Mymensingh Medical College	MMC	DU	1924	1962	225	Mymensingh	Mymensingh Division	
Sylhet MAG Osmani Medical College	SOMC	SMU	1936	1962	225	Sylhet	Sylhet Division	link
Sher-e-Bangla Medical College	SBMC	DU	1964	1968	225	Barishal	Barishal Division	link
Rangpur Medical College	RpMC	RMU	1970	1970	225	Rangpur	Rangpur Division	link
Cumilla Medical College	CuMC	CMU	1979	1992	200	Cumilla	Chattogram Division	link
Dinajpur Medical College	DjMC	RMU	1992	1992	200	Dinajpur	Rangpur Division	link
Faridpur Medical College	FMC	DU	1992	1992	200	Faridpur	Dhaka Division	link
Khulna Medical College	KMC	KMU	1992	1992	200	Khulna	Khulna Division	link
Shaheed Ziaur Rahman Medical College	SZMC	RMU	1992	1992	200	Bogura	Rajshahi Division	link
Cox's Bazar Medical College	CoxMC	CMU	2008	2008	100	Cox's Bazar	Chattogram Division	link
Noakhali Medical College	NMC	CMU	2008	2008	100	Noakhali	Chattogram Division	
Pabna Medical College	PMC	RMU	2008	2008	100	Pabna	Rajshahi Division	link
Jashore Medical College	JMC	KMU	2010	2010	100	Jashore	Khulna Division	link
Gopalganj Medical College	GGMC	DU	2011	2011	125	Gopalganj	Dhaka Division	
Kushtia Medical College	KuMC	KMU	2011	2011	100	Kushtia	Khulna Division	link
Satkhira Medical College	SMC	KMU	2011	2011	100	Satkhira	Khulna Division	link
Shahid Syed Nazrul Islam Medical College	SSNIMC	DU	2011	2011	100	Kishoreganj	Dhaka Division	link
Shaheed Tajuddin Ahmad Medical College	STAMC	DU	2013	2013	125	Gazipur	Dhaka Division	link
Jamalpur Medical College	JpMC	DU	2014	2014	100	Jamalpur	Mymensingh Division	link
Manikganj Medical College	MkMC	DU	2014	2014	125	Manikganj	Dhaka Division	link
Patuakhali Medical College	PkMC	DU	2014	2014	100	Patuakhali	Barishal Division	link
Rangamati Medical College	RmMC	CMU	2014	2014	75	Rangamati	Chattogram Division	link
Sirajganj Medical College	SjMC	RMU	2014	2014	100	Sirajganj	Rajshahi Division	link
Tangail Medical College	TMC	DU	2014	2014	125	Tangail	Dhaka Division	link
Mugda Medical College	MuMC	DU	2015	2016	100	Dhaka	Dhaka Division	link
Habiganj Medical College	HMC	SMU	2018	2018	50	Habiganj	Sylhet Division	link
Chandpur Medical College	ChMC	CMU	2018	2018	50	Chandpur	Chattogram Division	link
Magura Medical College	MaMC	KMU	2018	2018	50	Magura	Khulna Division	link
Naogaon Medical College	NaMC	RMU	2018	2018	50	Naogaon	Rajshahi Division	link
Netrokona Medical College, Netrokona	NMC	DU	2018	2018	50	Netrokona	Mymensingh Division	link
Nilphamari Medical College	NpMC	RMU	2018	2018	75	Nilphamari	Rangpur Division	NpMC
Sunamganj Medical College	SuMC	SMU	2020	2021	75	Sunamganj	Sylhet Division	link
Thakurgaon Medical College (proposed)	TAMC	RMU	2026	2027		Thakurgaon	Rangpur Division	

== Private medical colleges ==
There are 68 private medical colleges in Bangladesh .

No.	Medical college	Acronym	University	Established	College started	Enroll.	Location	Division	Website
1	Bangladesh Medical College	BMCH	DU	1986	1986	120	Dhaka	Dhaka division	link
2	Gonoshasthaya Samaj Vittik Medical College	GSVMC	DU	1998	1998	50	Savar	Dhaka division	link
3	Institute of Applied Health Sciences	IAHS	CMU	1989	1989	75	Chittagong	Chittagong Division	link
4	Jahurul Islam Medical College	JIMC	DU	1992	1992	100	Kishoreganj	Dhaka division	link
5	Medical College for Women & Hospital	MCW	DU	1992	1992	95	Dhaka	Dhaka division	link
6	Z. H. Sikder Women's Medical College	ZHSWMC	DU	1992	1992	100	Dhaka	Dhaka division	link
7	Dhaka National Medical College	DNMC	DU	1925	1994	130	Dhaka	Dhaka division	link
8	Community Based Medical College	CBMCB	DU	1995	1995	140	Mymensingh	Mymensingh Division	link
9	Jalalabad Ragib-Rabeya Medical College	JRRMC	SMU	1995	1995	130	Sylhet	Sylhet Division	link
10	Shaheed Monsur Ali Medical College	SMAMC	DU	1994	1994	140	Dhaka	Dhaka division	link
11	North East Medical College	NEMC	SMU	1998	1998	125	Sylhet	Sylhet Division	link
12	Holy Family Red Crescent Medical College	HFRCMC	DU	2000	2000	145	Dhaka	Dhaka division	link
13	International Medical College	IMC	DU	2000	2000	130	Gazipur	Dhaka division	link
14	North Bengal Medical College	NBMC	RMU	2000	2000	85	Sirajganj	Rajshahi Division	link
15	East West Medical College	EWMCH	DU	2000	2000	127	Dhaka	Dhaka division	link
16	Kumudini Women's Medical College	KWMC	DU	2001	2001	120	Tangail	Dhaka division	link
17	Tairunnessa Memorial Medical College	TMMC	DU	2002	2002	105	Gazipur	Dhaka division	link
18	Ibrahim Medical College	IMC	DU	2002	2002	120	Dhaka	Dhaka division	link
19	BGC Trust Medical College	BGCTMC	CMU	2002	2002	100	Chittagong	Chittagong Division	link
20	Shahabuddin Medical College	SMC	DU	2003	2003	90	Dhaka	Dhaka division	link
21	Enam Medical College and Hospital	EMCH	DU	2003	2003	155	Savar	Dhaka division	link
22	Islami Bank Medical College	IBMC	RMU	2003	2003	85	Rajshahi	Rajshahi Division	link
23	Ibn Sina Medical College	ISMC	DU	1995	2005	60	Dhaka	Dhaka division	link
24	Central Medical College	CEMEC	CMU	2005	2005	80	Comilla	Chittagong Division	link
25	Eastern Medical College	EMC	CMU	2005	2005	115	Comilla	Chittagong Division	link
26	Khwaja Yunus Ali Medical College	KYAMC	RMU	2005	2005	105	Enayetpur	Rajshahi Division	link
27	Chattagram Maa-O-Shishu Hospital Medical College	CMOSHMC	CMU	2005	2005	115	Agrabad	Chittagong Division	link
28	Sylhet Women's Medical College	SWMC	SMU	2005	2005	100	Sylhet	Sylhet Division	link|
29	Southern Medical College	SMCH	CMU	2006	2006	95	Chittagong	Chittagong division	link
30	Uttara Adhunik Medical College(BMSRI)	UAMC	DU	2007	2007	90	Dhaka	Dhaka division	link
31	Delta Medical College	DLMC	DU	2006	2006	90	Dhaka	Dhaka division	link
32	Ad-din Women's Medical College	AWMC	DU	2008	2008	100	Dhaka	Dhaka division	link
33	Dhaka Community Medical College	DCMC	DU	2008	2008	100	Dhaka	Dhaka division	link
34	TMSS Medical College	TMC	RMU	2008	2008	150	Bogura	Rajshahi Division	link
35	Anwer Khan Modern Medical College	AKMMC	DU	2008	2008	147	Dhaka	Dhaka division	link
36	Prime Medical College	PMC	RMU	2008	2008	125	Rangpur	Rangpur Division	link
37	Rangpur Community Medical College	RCMC	RMU	2001	2008	125	Rangpur	Rangpur Division	Link
38	Diabetic Association Medical College	DAMC	DU	2010	2010	80	Faridpur	Dhaka division	link
39	Green Life Medical College	GMCH	DU	2010	2010	100	Dhaka	Dhaka division	link
40	Popular Medical College	PMC	DU	2010	2010	90	Dhaka	Dhaka division	link
41	MH Samorita Medical College	MHSMC	DU	2010	2010	110	Dhaka	Dhaka division	link
42	Monno Medical College	MoMC	DU	2011	2012	85	Manikganj	Dhaka division	link
43	Dhaka Central International Medical College	DCIMC	DU	2011	2011	90	Dhaka	Dhaka division	link
44	Dr. Sirajul Islam Medical College	SIMC	DU	2011	2011	100	Dhaka	Dhaka division	link
45	Marks Medical College	MarksMC	DU	2011	2011	50	Dhaka	Dhaka division	link
46	Mainamoti Medical College	MMCH	CMU	2011	2011	100	Comilla	Chittagong Division	link
47	Ad-din Sakina Medical College	ASMC	SHMU	2012	2012	65	Jessore	Khulna Division	link
48	Gazi Medical College	GMC	SHMU	2011	2011	90	Khulna	Khulna Division	link
49	Barind Medical College	BMC	RMU	2011	2011	100	Rajshahi	Rajshahi Division	link
50	City Medical College	CiMC	DU	2011	2011	80	Gazipur	Dhaka division	link
51	Ashiyan Medical College	AMC	DU	2012	2012	50	Dhaka	Dhaka division	link
52	Aichi Medical College	AIMC	DU	2013	2013	50	Dhaka	Dhaka division	link
53	Bashundhara Ad-din Medical College	BAMC	DU	2014	2014	50	Dhaka	Dhaka division	link
54	President Abdul Hamid Medical College	PAHMC	DU	2013	2013	100	Kishoreganj	Dhaka division	link
55	Bikrampur Bhuiyan's Medical College	BBMC	DU	2014	2014	50	Munshiganj	Dhaka division	link
56	Universal Medical College and Hospital, Dhaka	UMC	DU	1996	2013	50	Dhaka	Dhaka division	link
57	Brahmanbaria Medical College	BBMC	CMU	2010	2013	60	Brahmanbaria	Chittagong Division	link
58	Parkview Medical College	PMC	SMU	2013	2013	72	Sylhet	Sylhet Division	link
59	Marine City Medical College	MCMC	CMU	2014	2014	65	Chittagong	Chittagong Division	link
60	Chattagram International Medical College	CIMCH	CMU	2013	2013	50	Chittagong	Chittagong Division	link
61	US-Bangla Medical College (Note: Owned by US-Bangla Group)	USBMC	DU	2013	2015	60	Narayanganj	Dhaka division	link
62	Ad-Din Akij Medical College	AAMC	SHMU	2013	2013	50	Khulna	Khulna Division	link
63	Monowara Sikder Medical College	MSMC	DU	2015	2016	50	Shariatpur	Dhaka division	link
64	Khulna City Medical College	KCMC	SHMU	2013	2016	50	Khulna	Khulna Division	link
65	United Medical College (Note: Owned by United Group)	UnMC	DU	2020	2020	50	Dhaka	Dhaka division	link
66	South Apollo Medical College	SAMC	DU	2018	2021	50	Barishal	Barisal division	link
67	Ahsania Mission Medical College	AMMC	DU	2021	2021	50	Dhaka	Dhaka division	link
68	Asgar Ali Medical College	AAMC	DU	2024		50	Dhaka	Dhaka Division	link

== Military medical colleges ==
No.	Medical College	Acronym	University	Established	College started	Enroll.	Location	Division	Website
1	Armed Forces Medical College	AFMC	BUP	1999	1999	125	Dhaka Cantonment	Dhaka Division	link
2	Army Medical College, Bogura	AMCB	BUP	2014	2014	50	Bogra Cantonment	Rajshahi division	link
3	Army Medical College, Chattogram	AMCC	BUP	2014	2014	50	Chittagong Cantonment	Chittagong division	link
4	Army Medical College, Cumilla	AMCCu	BUP	2014	2014	50	Cumilla Cantonment	Chittagong division	link
5	Army Medical College, Jashore	AMCJ	BUP	2014	2014	50	Jashore Cantonment	Khulna Division	link
6	Army Medical College, Rangpur	RAMC	BUP	2014	2014	50	Rangpur Cantonment	Rangpur Division	link
7	Navy Medical College, Chattogram	NMCC	BUP	2024	2024	50	BNS Issa Khan	Chattogram Division	link

== Public medical universities ==
University	Acronym	Founded	Location	Division	Specialization	Ph.D. granting	Website
Bangladesh Medical University	BMU	1965	Dhaka	Dhaka Division	Medical	Yes	link
Chittagong Medical University	CMU	2016	Chittagong	Chittagong Division	Medical	No	link
Rajshahi Medical University	RMU	2017	Rajshahi	Rajshahi Division	Medical	No	link
Sylhet Medical University	SMU	2018	Sylhet	Sylhet Division	Medical	No	link
Khulna Medical University	KMU	2020	Khulna	Khulna Division	Medical	No	link

== See also ==
- List of dental schools in Bangladesh
- Bangladesh Medical and Dental Council
- List of universities in Bangladesh
- List of schools in Bangladesh
- List of colleges in Bangladesh
- List of institutes in Bangladesh
- Textile schools in Bangladesh
- List of architecture schools in Bangladesh
- University Grants Commission (Bangladesh)
