= Tangail Medical College =

Tangail Medical College টাঙ্গাইল মেডিকেল কলেজ
- Former name: Sheikh Hasina Medical College
- Type: Public Medical College
- Established: 2014
- Academic affiliations: University of Dhaka
- Principal: Md. Nurul Amin Miah
- Academic staff: 104
- Administrative staff: 26
- Students: 431
- Undergraduates: MBBS
- Location: Tangail, Bangladesh

Tangail Medical College is a government medical school in Bangladesh, established in 2014. It is situated at the Kodalia Area of Tangail city.

== History ==
In 2008, before the 9th parliamentary election of Bangladesh, Prime Minister Sheikh Hasina promised the people of Tangail to establish a government-financed medical school in Tangail city. As her party continued to rule as Government of Bangladesh for 2nd consecutive time in 2014, a decision was taken in August 2014 by the government to start Sheikh Hasina Medical College, Tangaill alongside five other new medical colleges (Jamalpur Medical College, Manikganj Medical College, Shaheed M. Monsur Ali Medical College, Patuakhali Medical College, Rangamati Medical College). SHMCT is the 24th public medical college of Bangladesh.

On October 30, 2024, the Ministry of Health and Family Welfare changed the name of the medical college to "Tangail Medical College" from Sheikh Hasina Medical College.

== See also ==
- List of medical colleges in Bangladesh
