= Dinajpur Medical College =

Government medical college in Dinajpur, Bangladesh

- দিনাজপুর মেডিকেল কলেজ
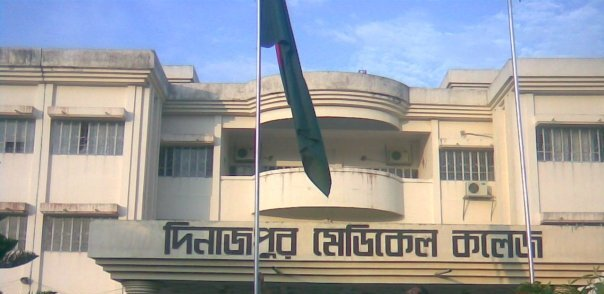
- Former names: M Abdur Rahim Medical College
- Motto: Study in the name of God, who created you
- Type: Public medical school
- Established: 1992
- Academic affiliations: Rajshahi Medical University University of Rajshahi
- Principal: A. F. M Nurullah
- Director: A T M Nuruzzaman
- Academic staff: 83
- Administrative staff: 147
- Students: 1,000
- Location: Dinajpur, Dinajpur District, Bangladesh; 25.6106°N 88.6551°E
- Campus: Urban
- Language: English

Dinajpur Medical College (Bengali: দিনাজপুর মেডিকেল কলেজ) or shortly DjMC is a public medical school in Bangladesh, established in 1992. It is located in the Dinajpur District of Rangpur Division. It is affiliated with Rajshahi Medical University. On October 30, 2024, the Ministry of Health and Family Welfare changed the name of the medical college to "Dinajpur Medical College".

== Campus ==
=== Mosque ===
It is two storied building, situated at the south-west corner of the Dinajpur Medical College Playground.

=== Hostels ===
The name of the boys hostel is Dr. Md. Yousuf Ali Hall. It includes two four-storied buildings beside the play ground.

The name of the girls hostel is Dr. Md. Taibur Rahman Hall. It includes three four-storied building. It has three blocks. Eastern block, Western block and Main hostel.

There are two four-storied building for intern doctors. One for boys and one for girls. They are well decorated and behind the hospital for 24-hour medical service. There are two hostels for trainee nurses, near the nursing institute. There are also number of quarters for teachers, doctors, nurses and guest house for guests.

=== Dinajpur Nursing College ===
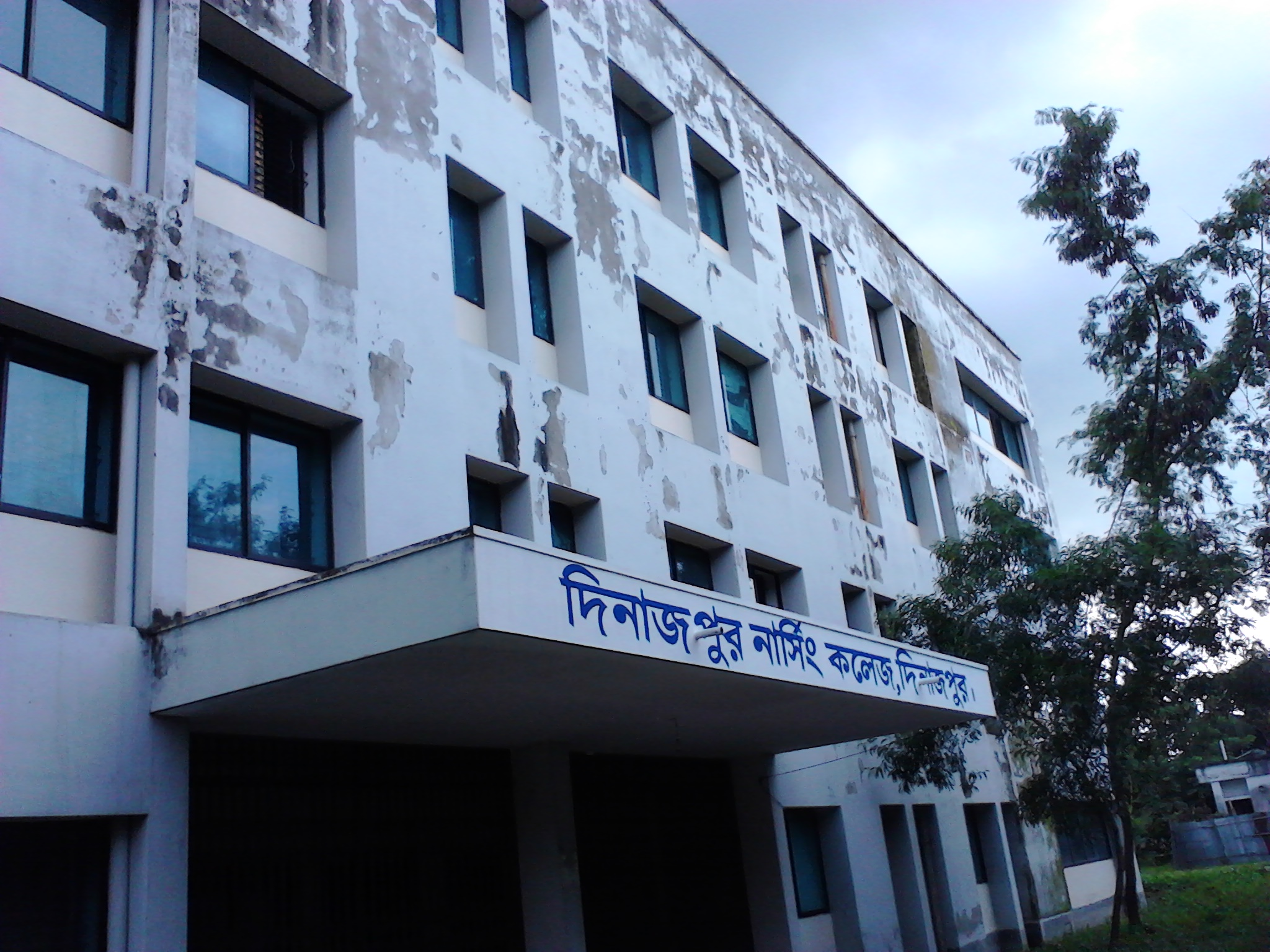
Dinajpur Nursing College, Front view

There is a well-developed nursing college affiliated with the hospital. It provides training for young nurses. There are also hostels for nurses near the hospital. This nursing college is affiliated to Rajshahi Medical University and BNMC approved govt intuition. This Nursing college provide Bsc in Nursing degree through the affiliated university and Diploma in midwifery under BNMC. It was established in 2016. The founder principal was D. Sharmin Sattar and Running Principal is Kohinoor Begum.

=== Other institutions under its affiliation ===
- Dinajpur 250-bed general Hospital
- Zia Heart Foundation Hospital
- Diabetic Hospital
- BNSB Eye Hospital
- MCHC Center
- School Health Center
- Center For Nuclear medicine, Dinajpur
- Chest Disease Clinic
- Leprosy Clinic

== Administration ==
The current principal is A. F. M Nurullah (professor and head of the radiology department).

=== Phase coordinators ===
- 1st Phase: Dr.Pallab kumar Das(head of the Anatomy department)
- 2nd Phase: Md. Jiaul Hasan (head of the pharmacology department)
- 3rd Phase: Jogendranath Sarkar (head of the microbiology department)
- 4th Phase: Nuruzzaman (head of the radiology department)

== Academics ==
Dinajpur Medical College admits 180 students into the MBBS degree programme yearly under the government medical admission test. Dinajpur Medical College is under DGHS and curriculum by Bangladesh Medical and Dental Council (BMDC). The admission test is conducted centrally under Directorate General of Health Services. Dinajpur Medical College admits a good number of postgraduate students to different postgraduate course offered by the college under BSMMU. Dinajpur Medical College is affiliated with BSMMU and Bangladesh College of Physicians and Surgeons. For foreign students, admission is through the Embassy of Bangladesh in respective countries. Many students are admitted from Pakistan, Nepal, Bhutan. 25 batches have passed from this medical college successfully.

=== Courses ===
Dinajpur Medical College offers both undergraduate and postgraduate degrees.

== Recognition ==
The degree is recognised by the Bangladesh Medical and Dental Council. Graduates of the medical college are eligible for USMLE and PLAB examination. Dinajpur Medical College is listed in the IMED.

== Clubs and other activities ==
- Rhythm blood Donor Club (RBDC): It is currently the most popular club of DjMCH
- Sandhani
- Medicine Club
- Medical Dawah Society, DjMC Unit
- Probaho Cultural Organisation (A progressive Cultural Group of DjMC)
- Oikotan (cultural organisation of marmc)

== See also ==
- List of medical colleges in Bangladesh
