= Prime Medical College =

Private medical college in Rangpur, Bangladesh

- প্রাইম মেডিকেল কলেজ
- Type: Private medical school
- Established: 2008
- Academic affiliations: University of Rajshahi and Rajshahi Medical University
- Chairman: Farzana Afroze
- Principal: Md. Noor Islam
- Academic staff: 124
- Location: Pirzabad, Rangpur, Bangladesh; 25.7437°N 89.2226°E
- Campus: Urban
- Language: English
- Website: pmcbd.org

Prime Medical College (PMC) (Bengali: প্রাইম মেডিকেল কলেজ) is a private medical school in Bangladesh, established in 2008. It is located in Pirzabad, on the western fringes of Rangpur. It is affiliated with Rajshahi Medical University.

It offers a five-year course of study leading to a Bachelor of Medicine, Bachelor of Surgery (MBBS) degree. A one-year internship after graduation is compulsory for all graduates. The degree is recognised by the Bangladesh Medical and Dental Council (BMDC).

== History ==
Prime Medical College was established in 2008.

== Campus ==
The college is located in Pirzabad, on the western fringes of Rangpur, along the Rangpur–Badarganj road. The main buildings on campus are: an academic building, separate hostels for men and women, and Prime Medical College Hospital, the college's 750-bed teaching hospital.

== Organization and administration ==
The college is affiliated with Rajshahi University under the Faculty of Medicine. The chairman of the college is Farzana Afroze . The principal is Md. Noor Islam.

== Academics ==
The college offers a five-year course of study, approved by the Bangladesh Medical and Dental Council (BMDC), leading to a Bachelor of Medicine, Bachelor of Surgery (MBBS) degree from Rajshahi University . After passing the final professional examination, there is a compulsory one-year internship. The internship is a prerequisite for obtaining registration from the BMDC to practice medicine. In October 2014, the Ministry of Health and Family Welfare capped admission and tuition fees at private medical colleges at 1,990,000 Bangladeshi taka (US$25,750 as of 2014) total for their five-year courses.

Admission for Bangladeshis to the MBBS programmes at all medical colleges in Bangladesh (government and private) is conducted centrally by the Directorate General of Health Services (DGHS). It administers a written multiple choice question exam simultaneously throughout the country. Candidates are admitted based primarily on their score on this test, although grades at Secondary School Certificate (SSC) and Higher Secondary School Certificate (HSC) level also play a part. 5% of seats are reserved for students from underprivileged backgrounds, and another 5% are reserved for the college's governing body. 30% are reserved for foreign students. Admission for foreign students is based on their SSC and HSC grades. As of July 2014, the college is allowed to admit 120 students annually.

== See also ==
- List of medical colleges in Bangladesh
