= Sirajganj Medical College =

Government medical college in Sirajganj, Bangladesh

- সিরাজগঞ্জ মেডিকেল কলেজ
- Logo of Sirajganj Medical College
- Former names: Shaheed M. Monsur Ali Medical College, Sirajganj (2014-2026); Sirajganj Medical College (2014)
- Type: Public Medical School
- Established: 2014; 12 years ago
- Academic affiliations: Rajshahi Medical University
- Principal: Dr. Md. Zulfiqur Ali
- Students: 500+
- Location: Sirajganj, Bangladesh; 24.448777°N 89.673778°E
- Campus: 30 acres (12 ha) (Satellite View); Urban
- Language: Bangla & English
- Colours: Cyan & Gold
- Website: https://www.smmamc.gov.bd

Sirajganj Medical College (SjMC) (Bengali: সিরাজগঞ্জ মেডিকেল কলেজ) is a public medical school in Bangladesh, established in 2014. It is located at Sirajganj District. The college is affiliated with the Rajshahi Medical University.

It offers 5 year MBBS course and admits ~100 students every year. The college and hospital extend over an area of 121,406 square meters (30.000 acres) fully built campus.

== History ==
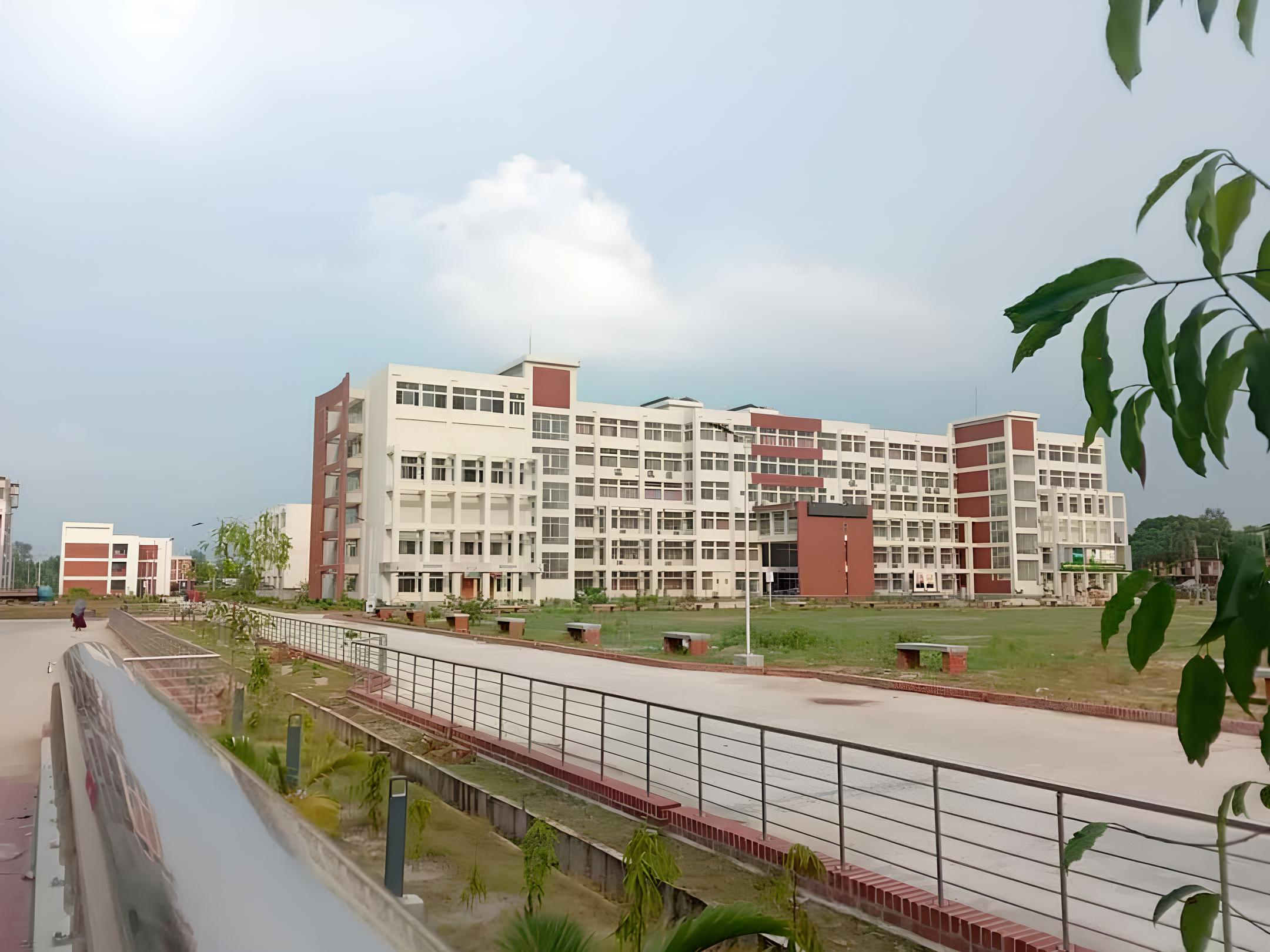
Academic Building

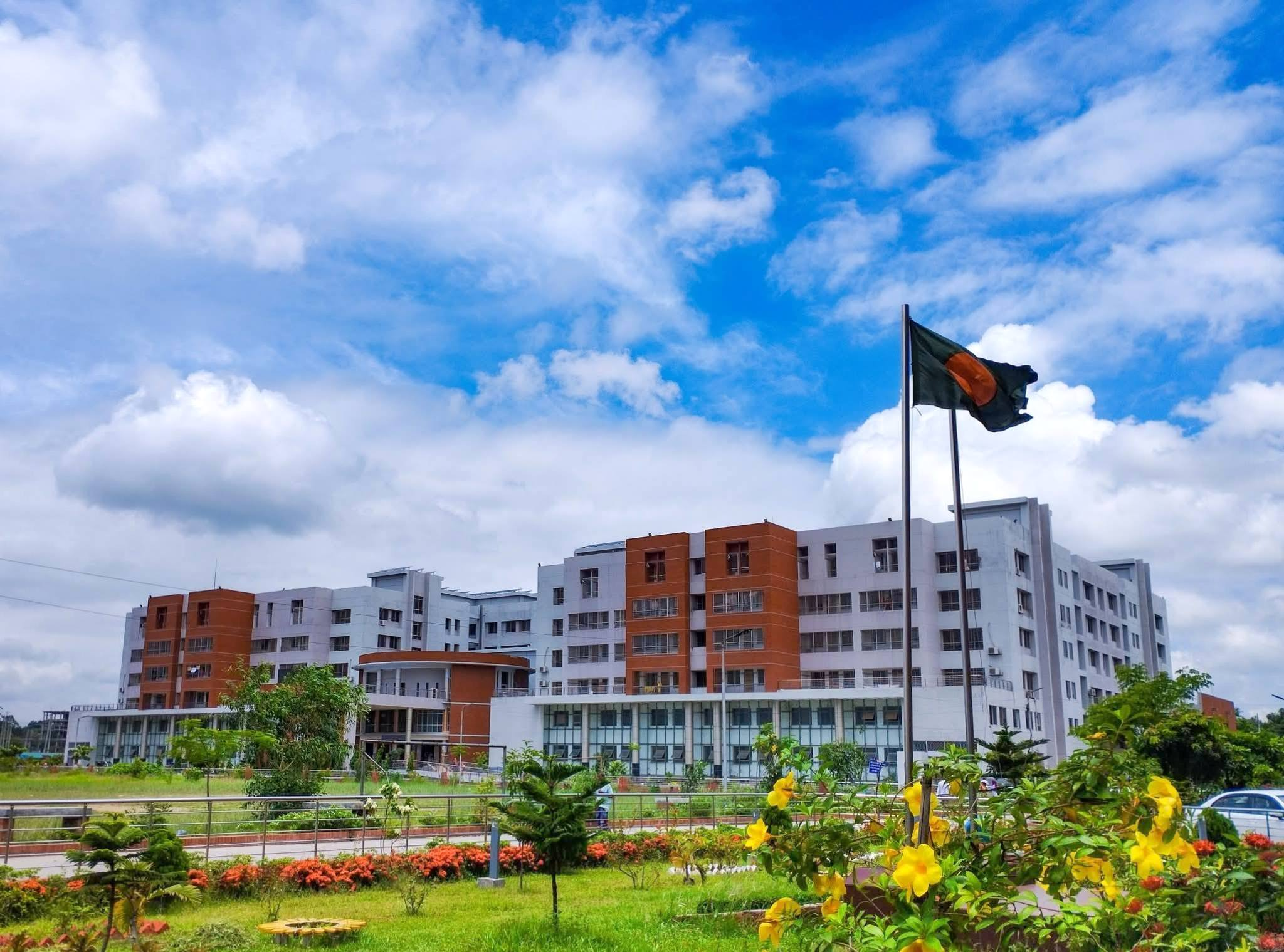
Hospital Building

The college was formed as "Sirajganj Medical College" (SjMC). Soon, it was renamed to "Shaheed M. Monsur Ali Medical College, Sirajganj" (SMMAMC). It was named after Muhammad Mansur Ali, a former renowned Bangladeshi politician. In 21st April 2026, the previous name "Sirajganj Medical College" (SjMC) was restored.

== Examination and affiliation ==
Sirajganj Medical College (SjMC) (Former Name : Shaheed M. Monsur Ali Medical College, Sirajganj) is affiliated with Rajshahi Medical University (Previously Rajshahi University). The students receive their MBBS degrees from Rajshahi Medical University after completing 5 years of studying and passing the final professional MBBS examination.

This college is directly governed by Bangladesh Medical and Dental Council (BMDC) - an affiliation of the Ministry of Health.

== Admissions ==
Admission for Bangladeshis to the MBBS programmes at all the medical colleges in Bangladesh (government and private) is conducted centrally by the Directorate General of Health Services (DGHS). It administers a written multiple choice question exam simultaneously throughout the country. Candidates are admitted primarily based on their score on this test, although grades at Secondary School Certificate (SSC) and Higher Secondary School Certificate (HSC) level also play a vital part as the examination is very competitive, over ~143,000 students applied for ~4350 public seats in 2022. As of 2024, the college is allowed to admit ~100 students annually.

== Recognition ==
The Bachelor of Medicine and Bachelor of Surgery (MBBS) degree is recognized by the Bangladesh Medical and Dental Council (BM&DC). Graduates of the medical college are eligible to sit for international medical examinations, including USMLE, AMC, PLAB, MRCP and MRCS. Sirajganj Medical College (SjMC) (Former Name : Shaheed M. Monsur Ali Medical College, Sirajganj) is also listed in the IMED and recognized by the ECFMG.

== Sirajganj Medical College Journal ==
"Journal of Sirajganj Medical College" (Former Name : Journal of SMMAMC) is BMDC recognized journal. It accepts original papers, review articles, case reports and short communications related to various disciplines of medical science for publication. Papers should be solely contributed to the journal.

== Clubs, Associations and Extracurricular Activities ==
- Sandhani (SjMC Unit)
- Medicine Club (SjMC Unit)
- (Kalpataru) (Cultural Club of SjMC)
- SjMC Debating Society
- SjMC Sports Club

== Gallery ==
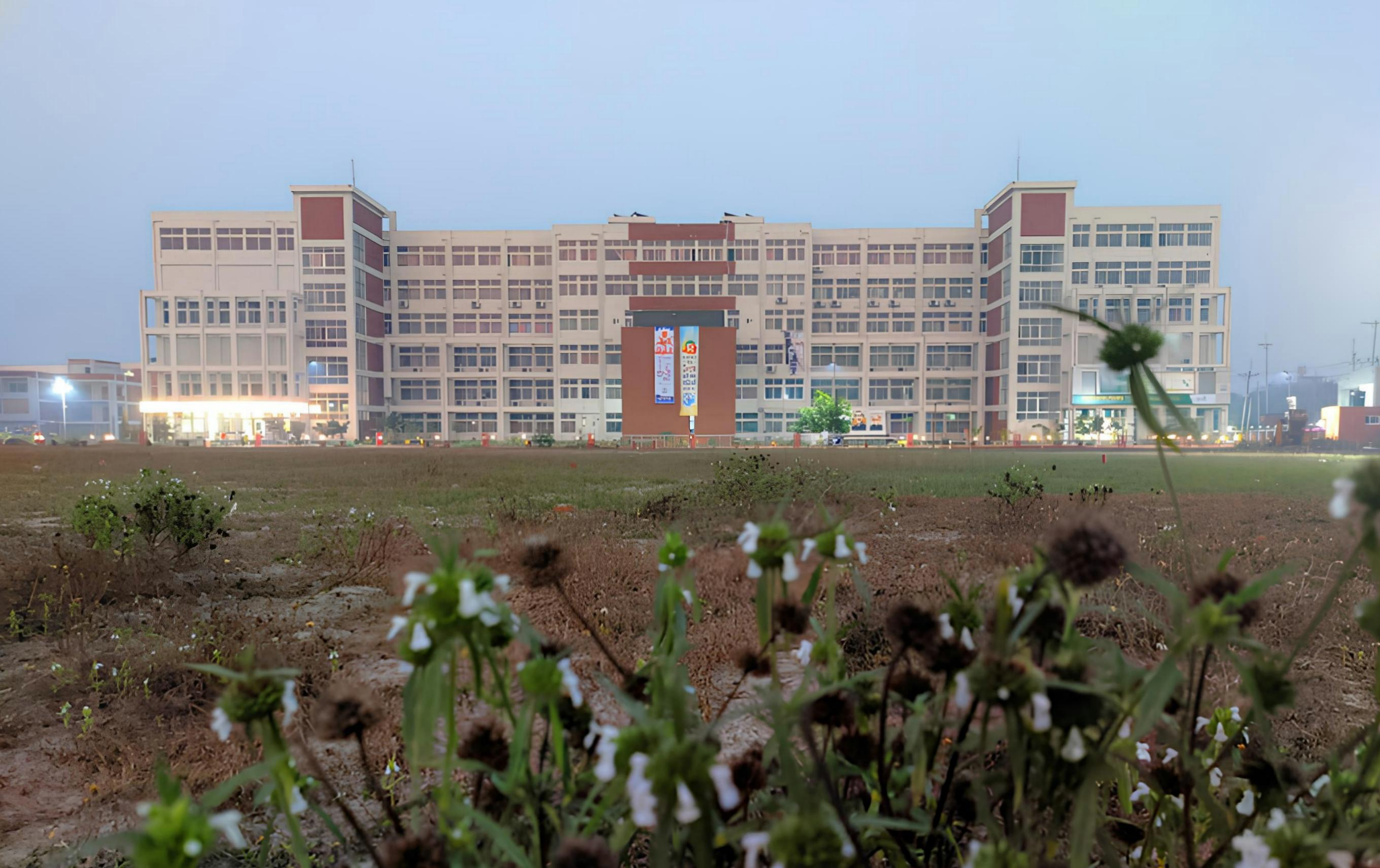
Academic Building

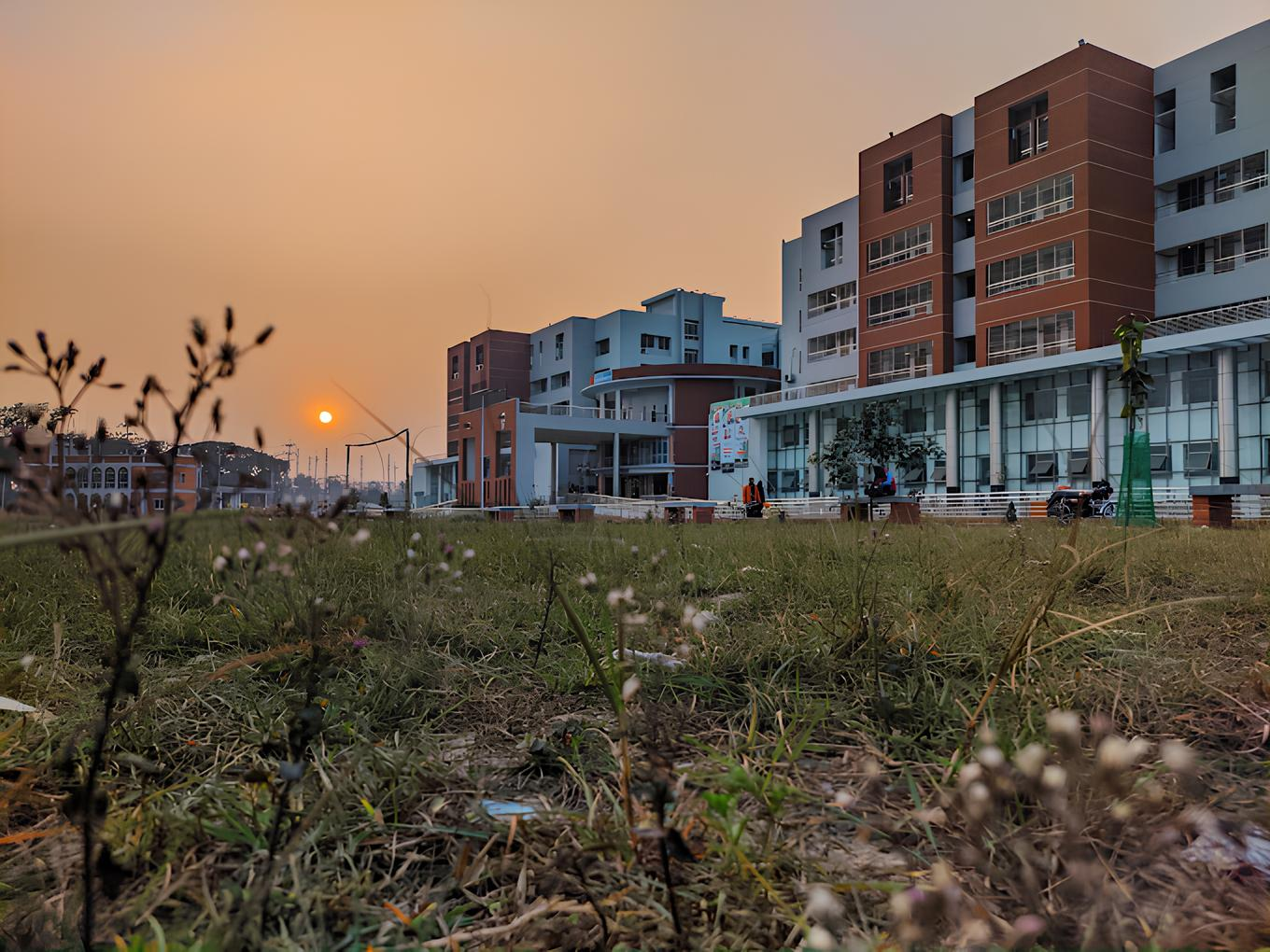
Hospital Building

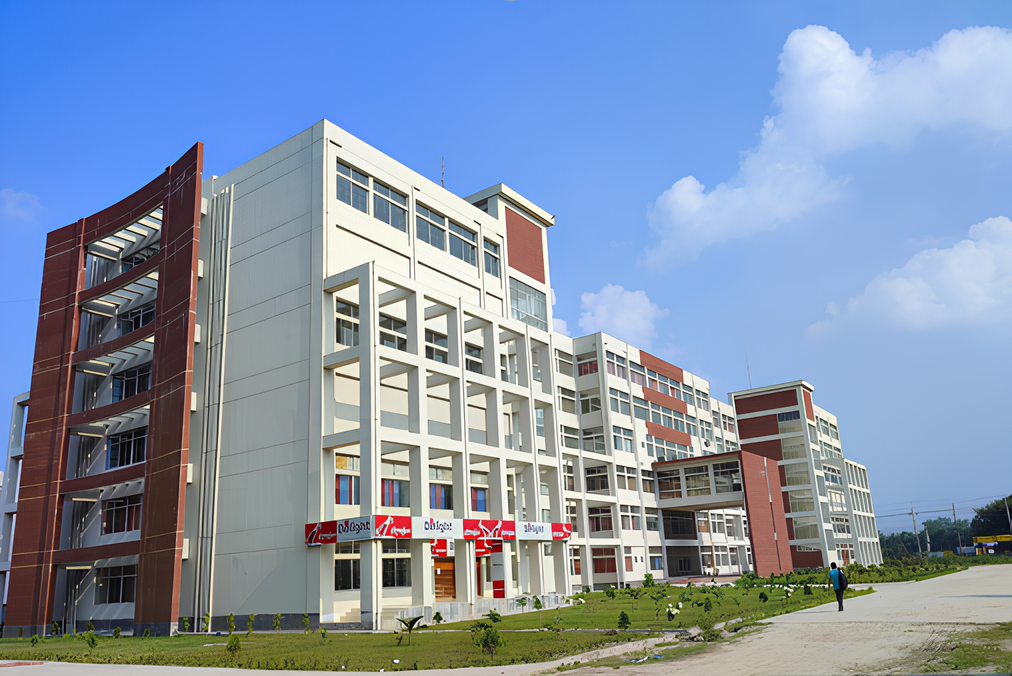
Academic Building

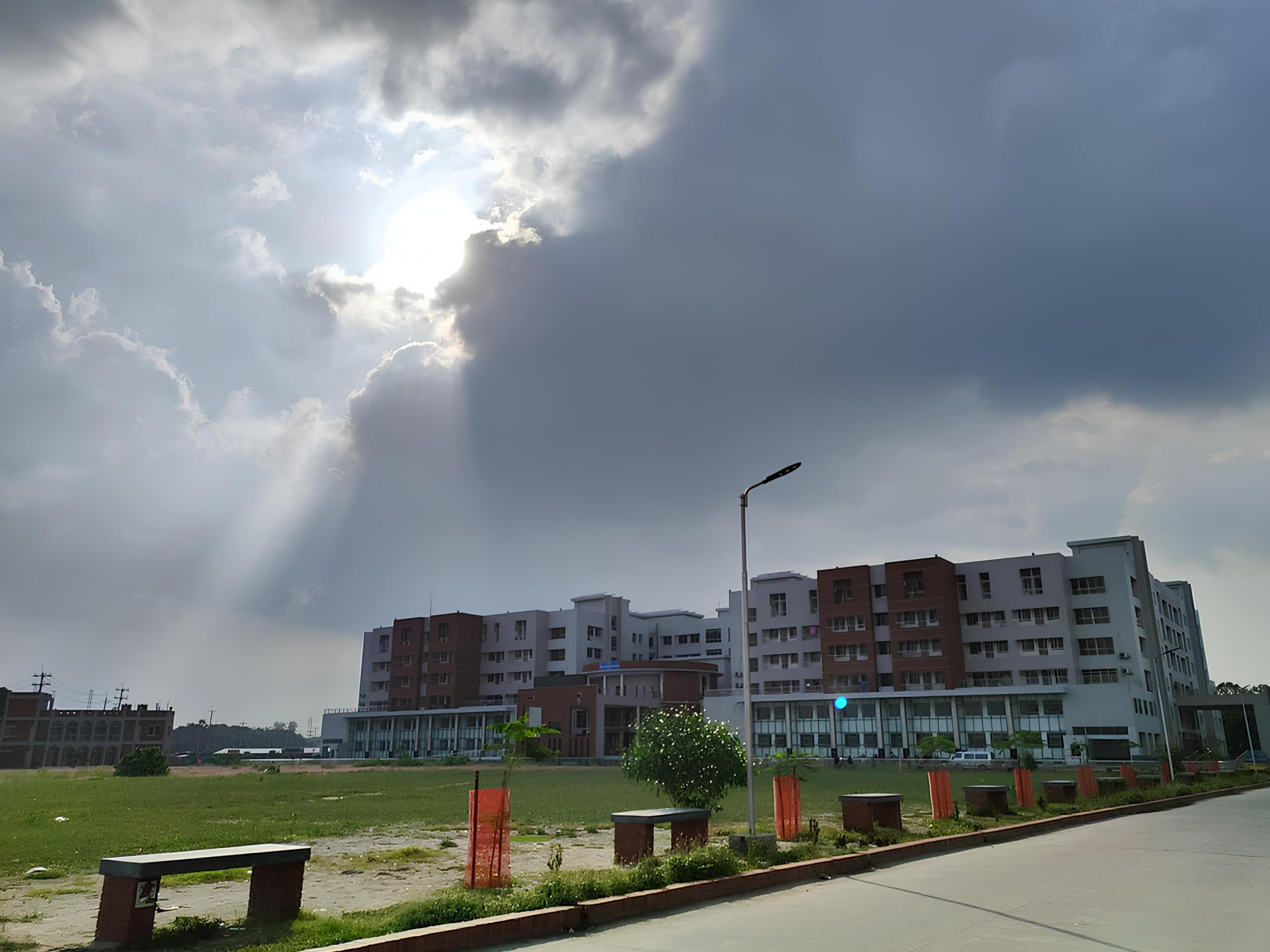
Hospital Building

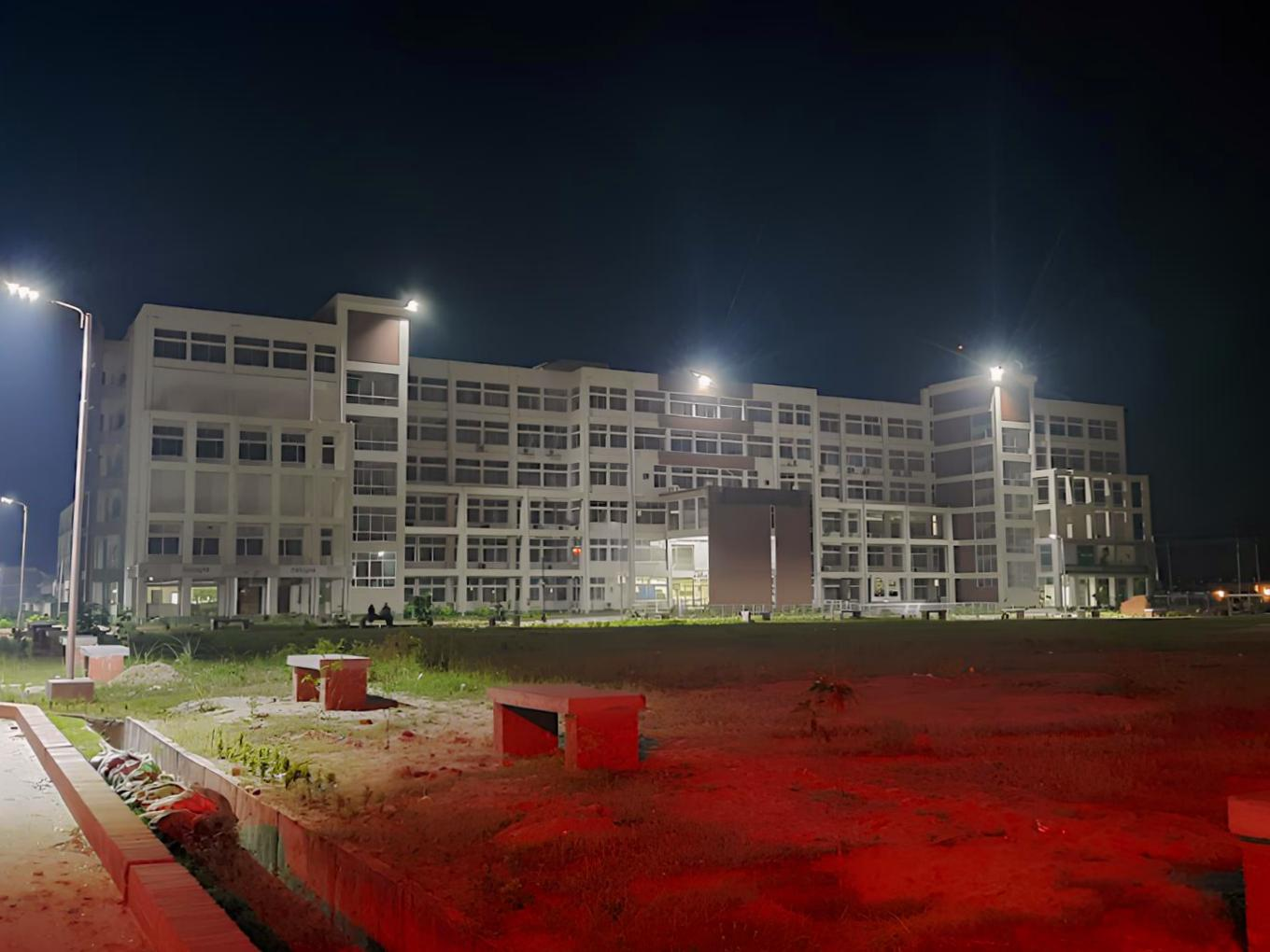
Academic Building At Night

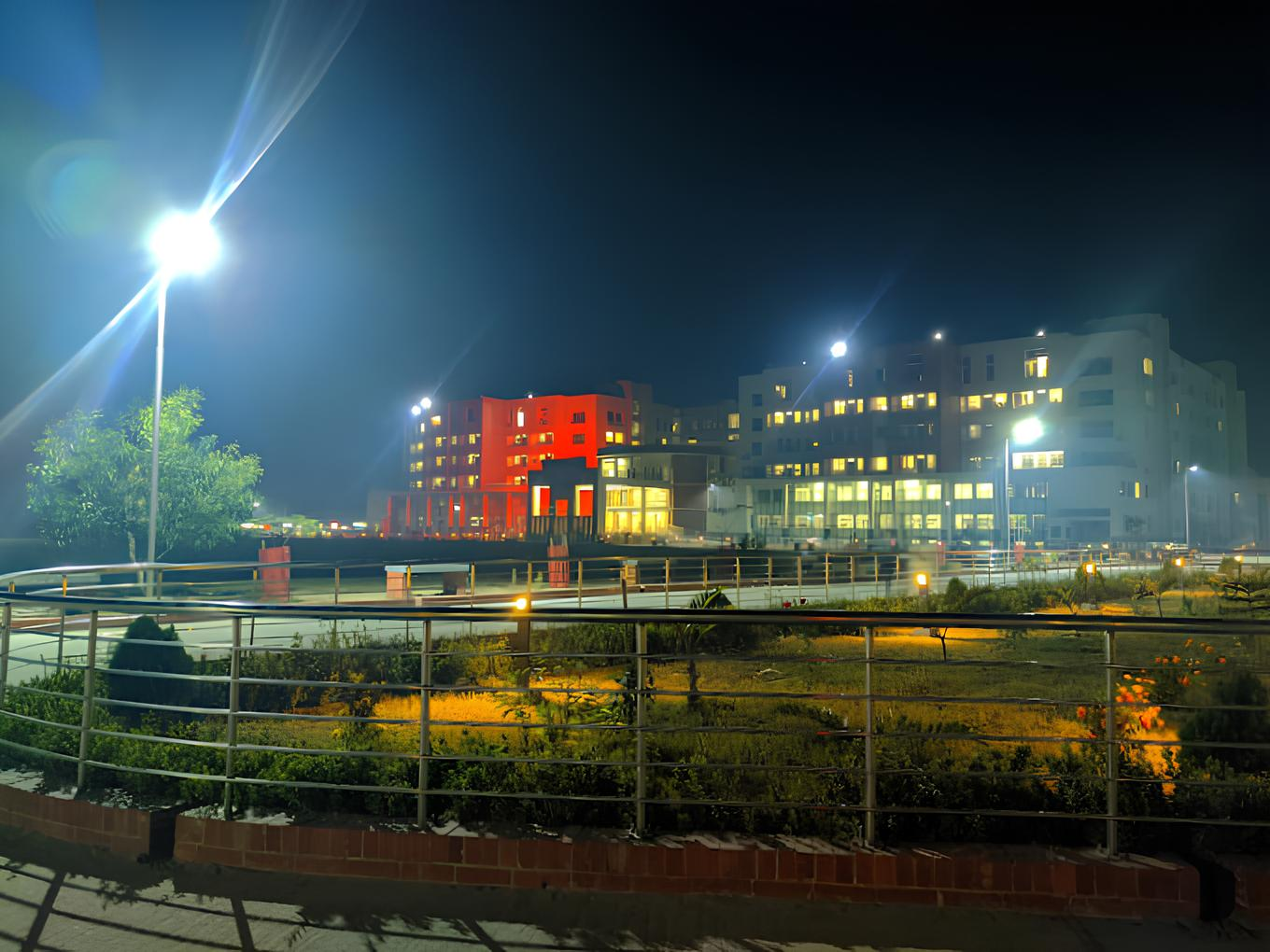
Hospital Building At Night

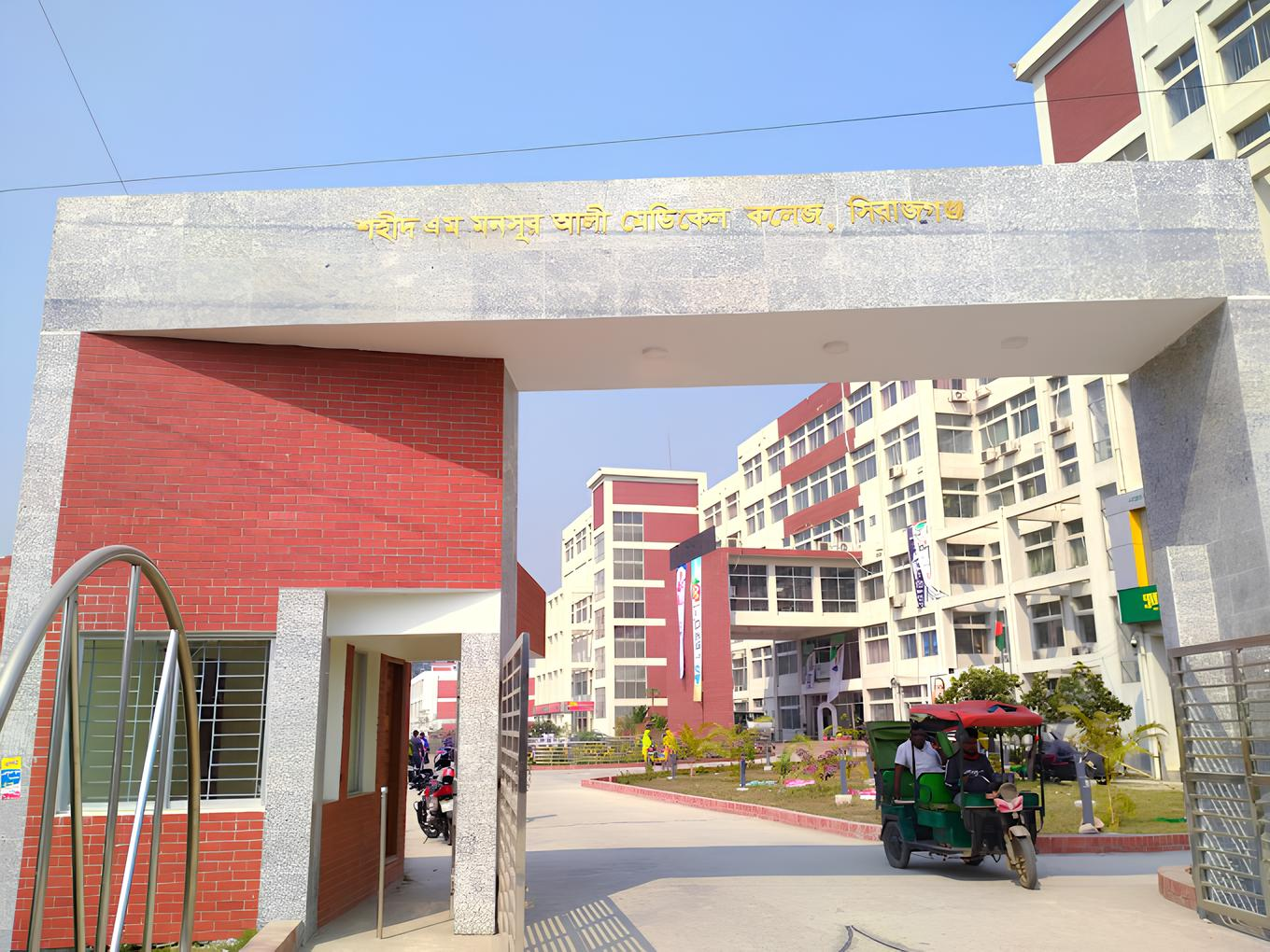
SjMC Campus

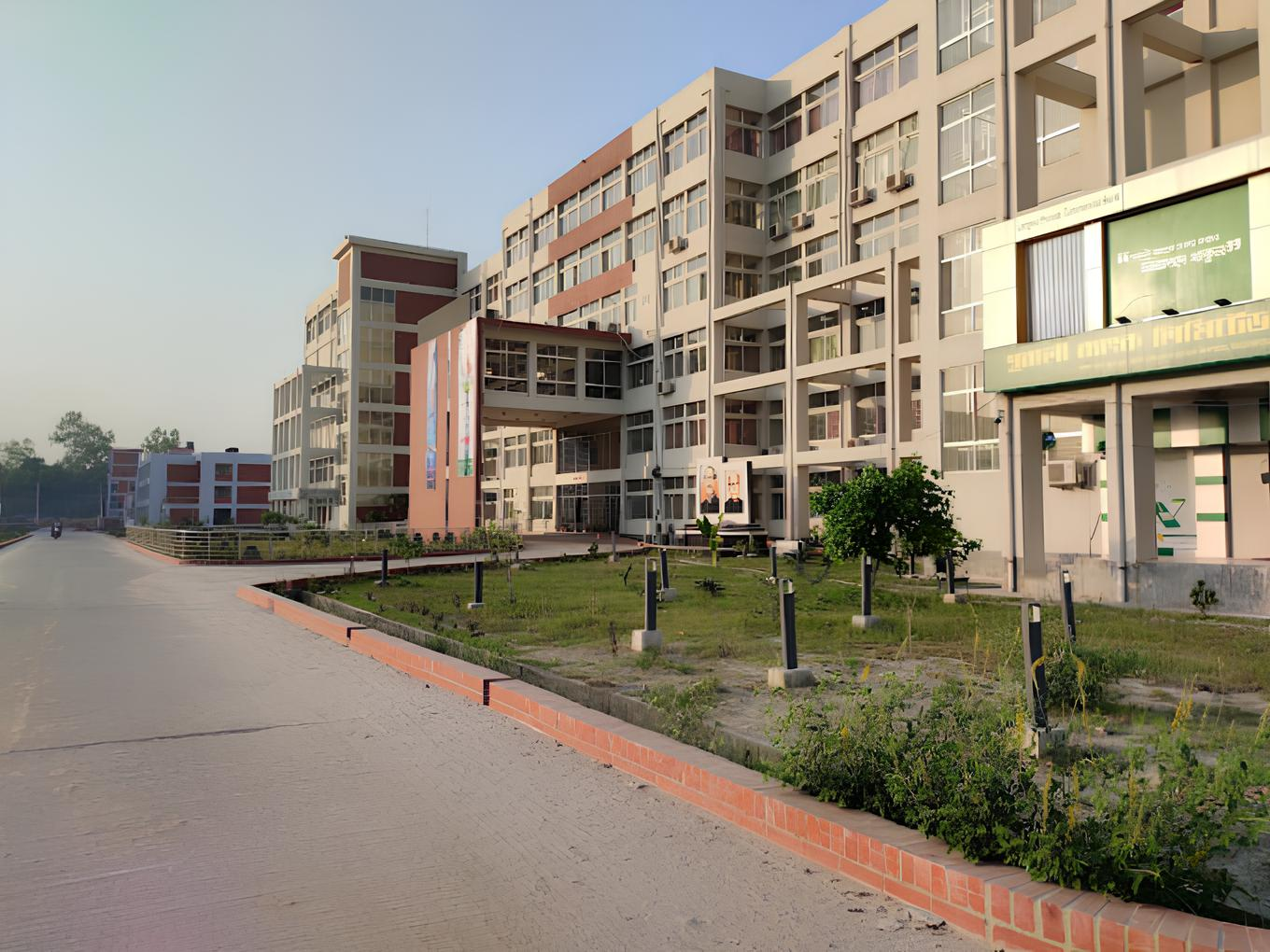
SjMC Campus

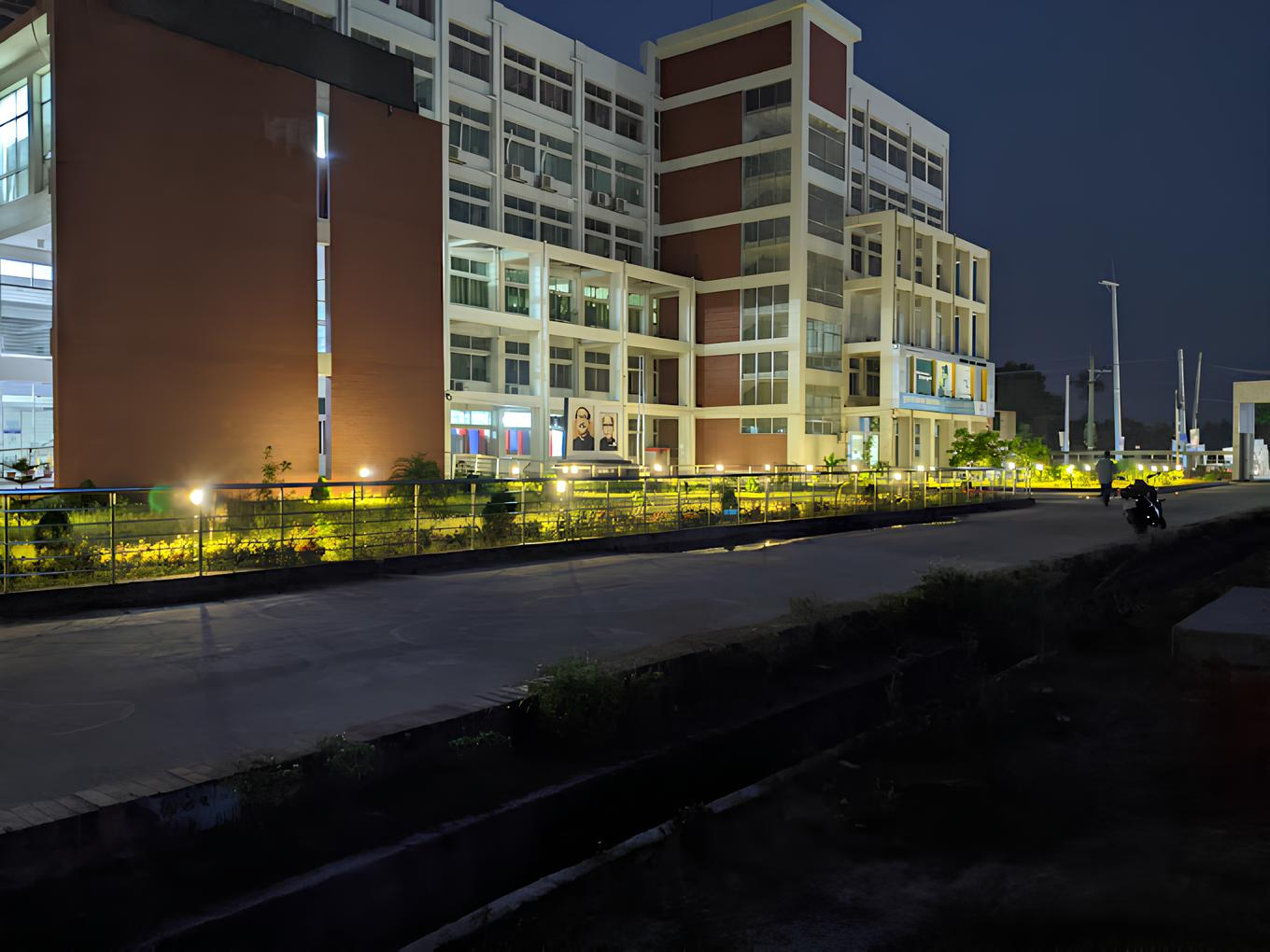
SjMC Campus

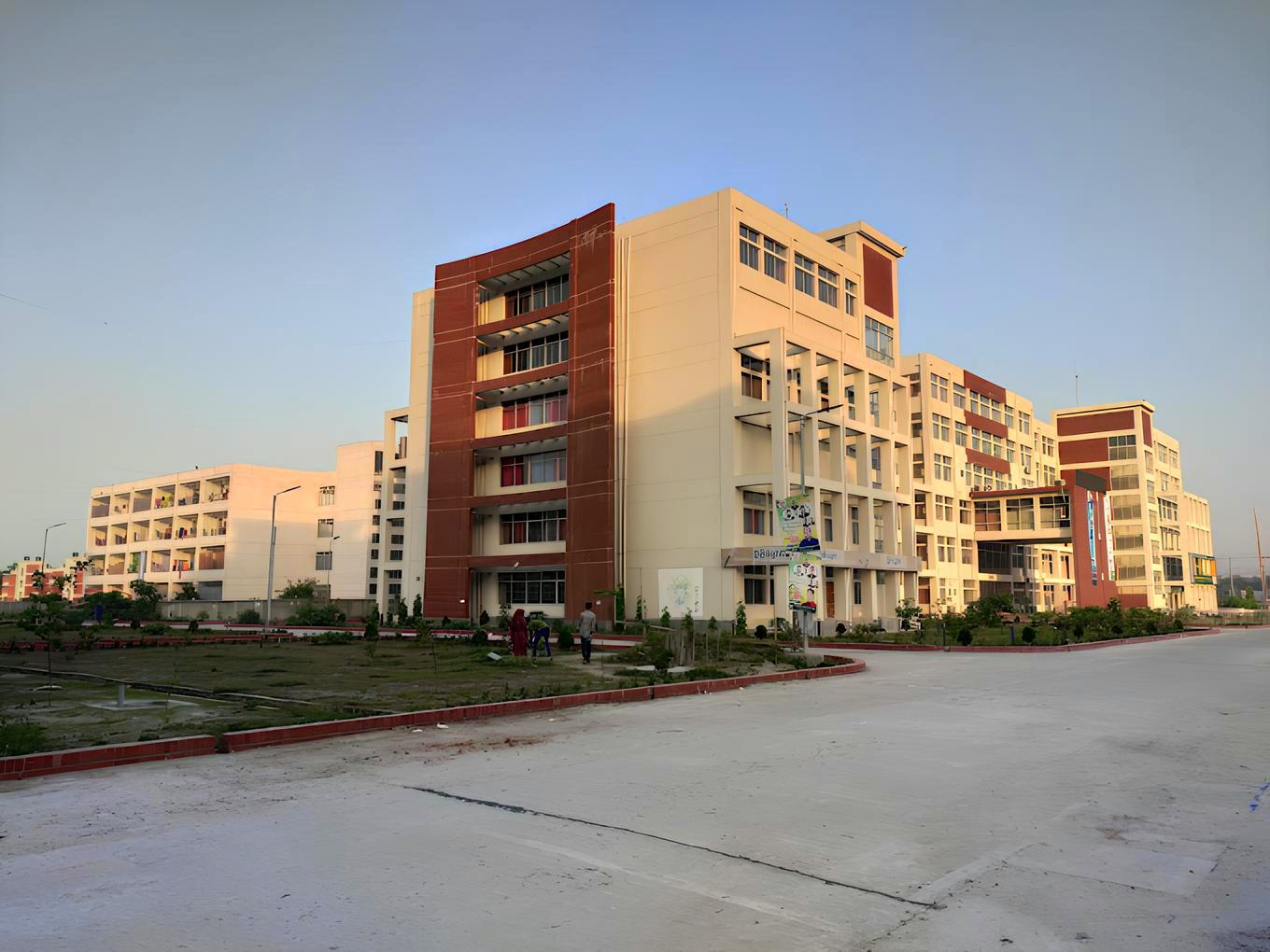
SjMC Campus

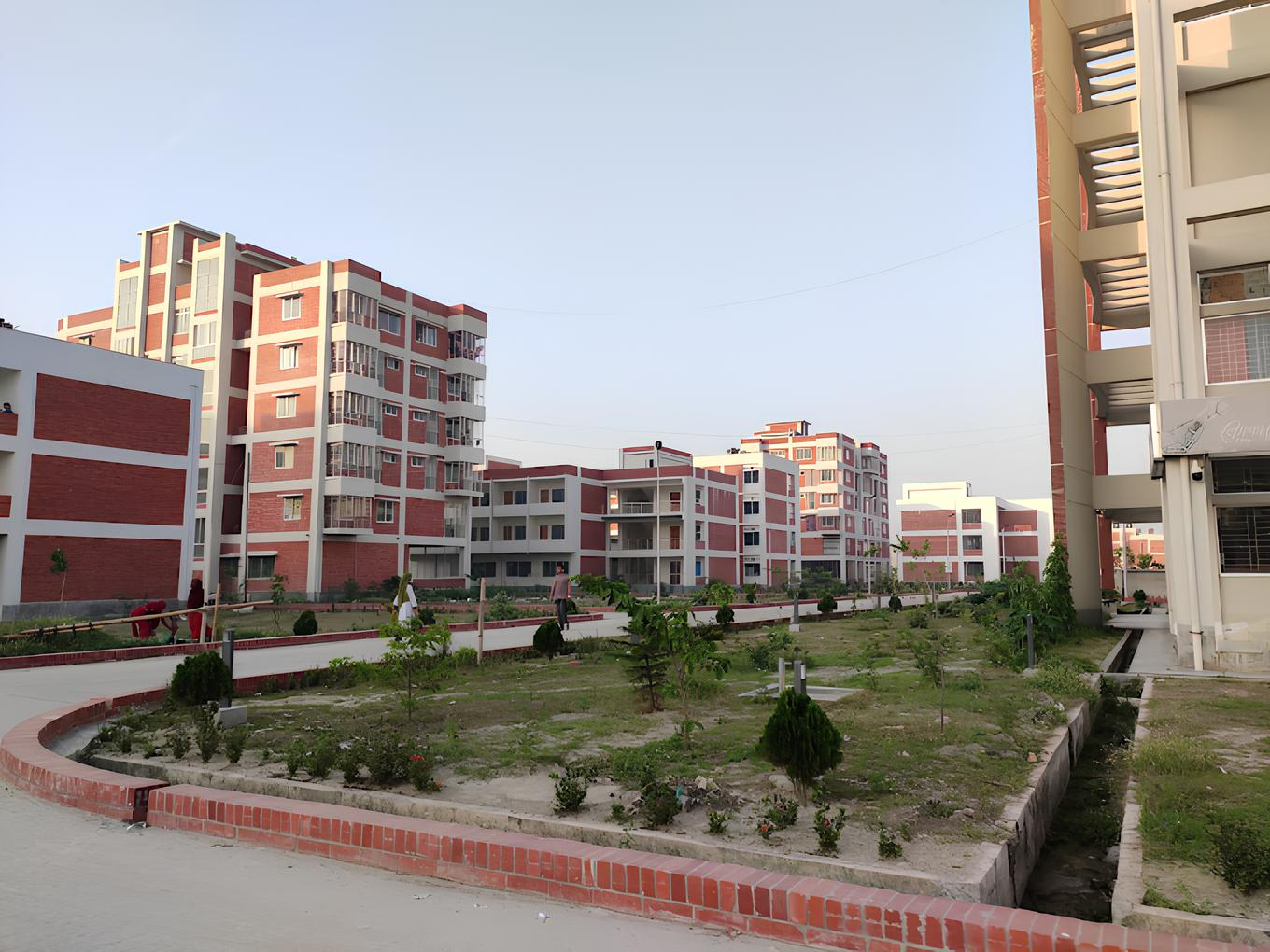
SjMC Campus

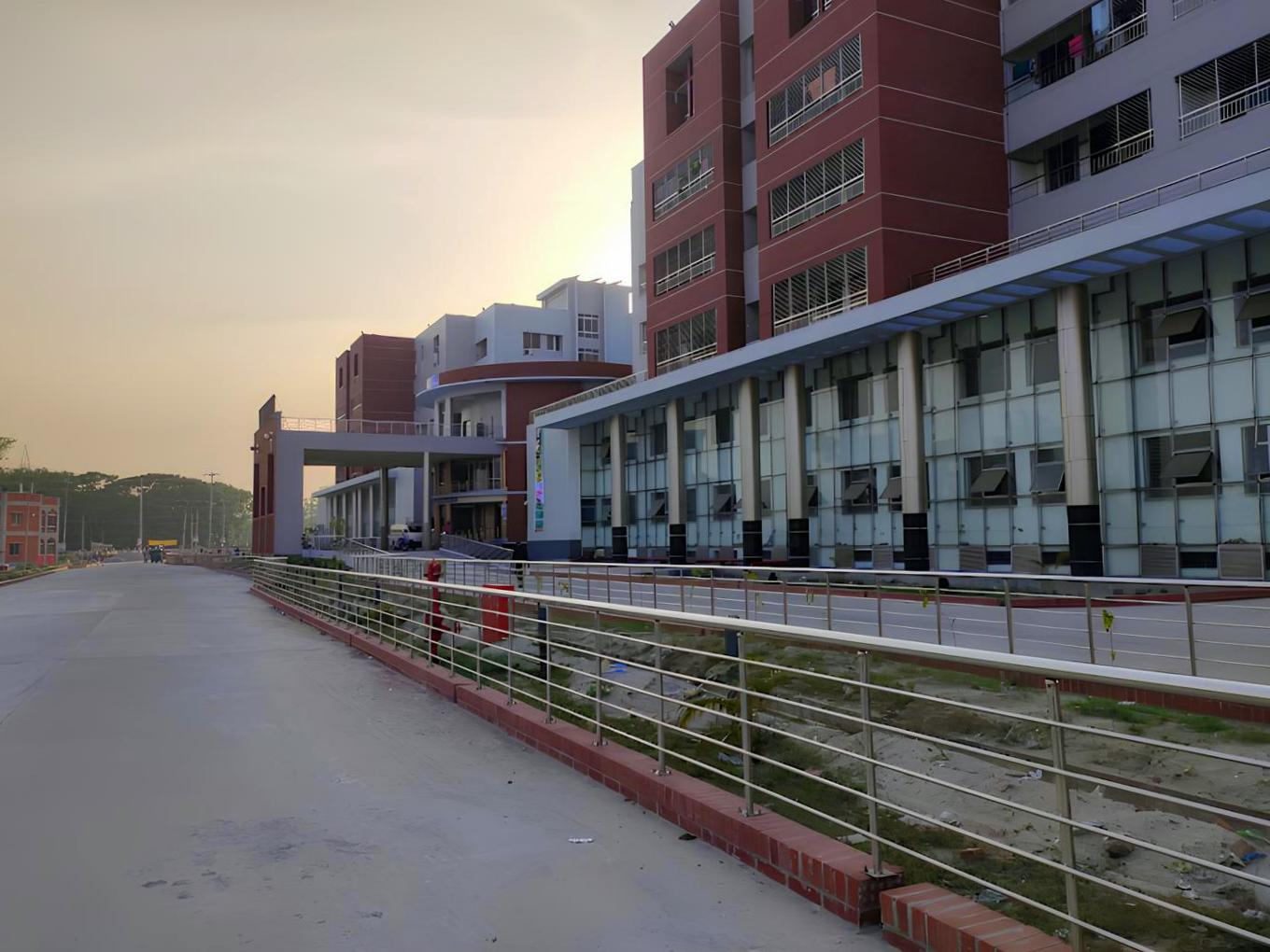
SjMC Campus

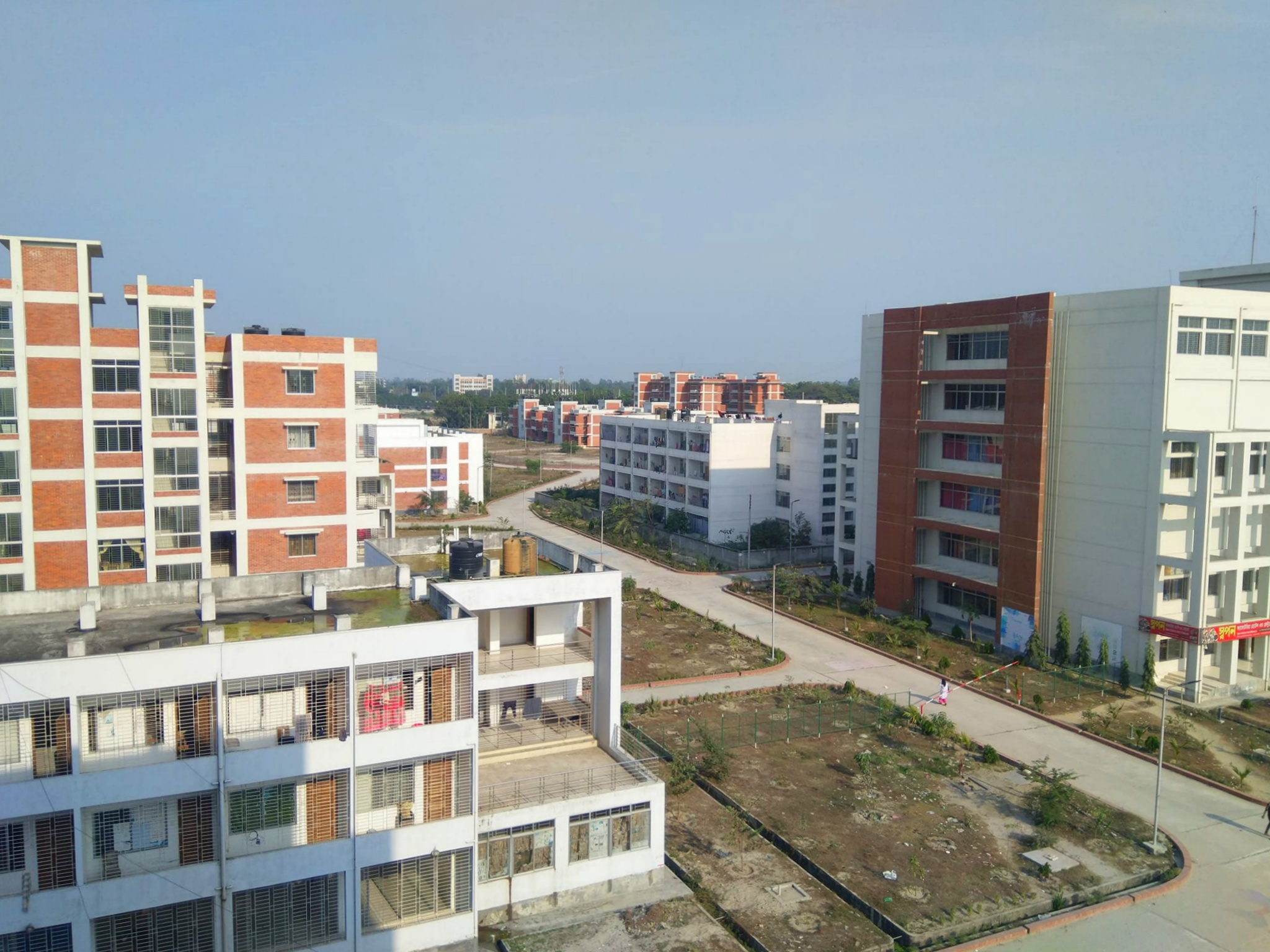
SjMC Campus

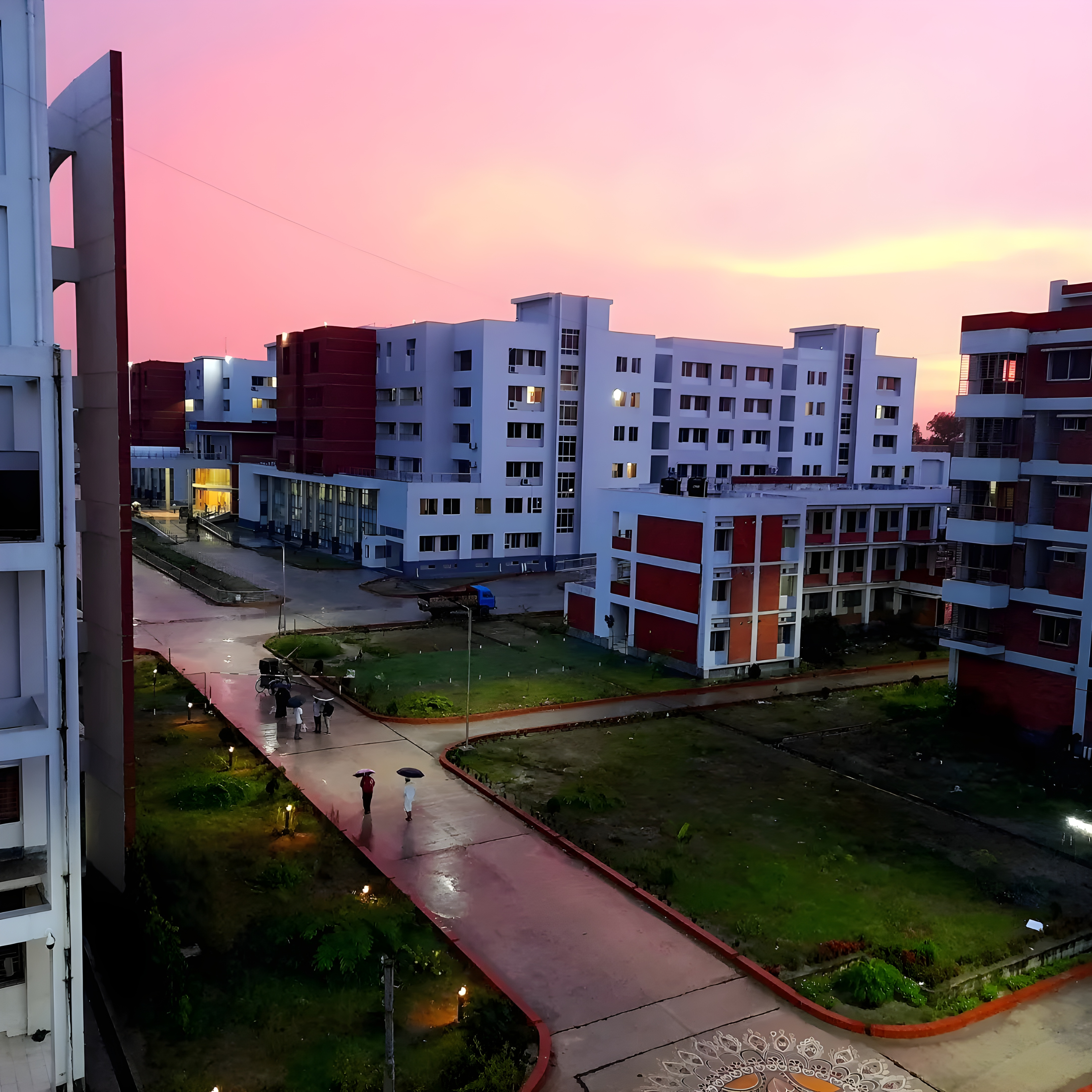
SjMC Campus

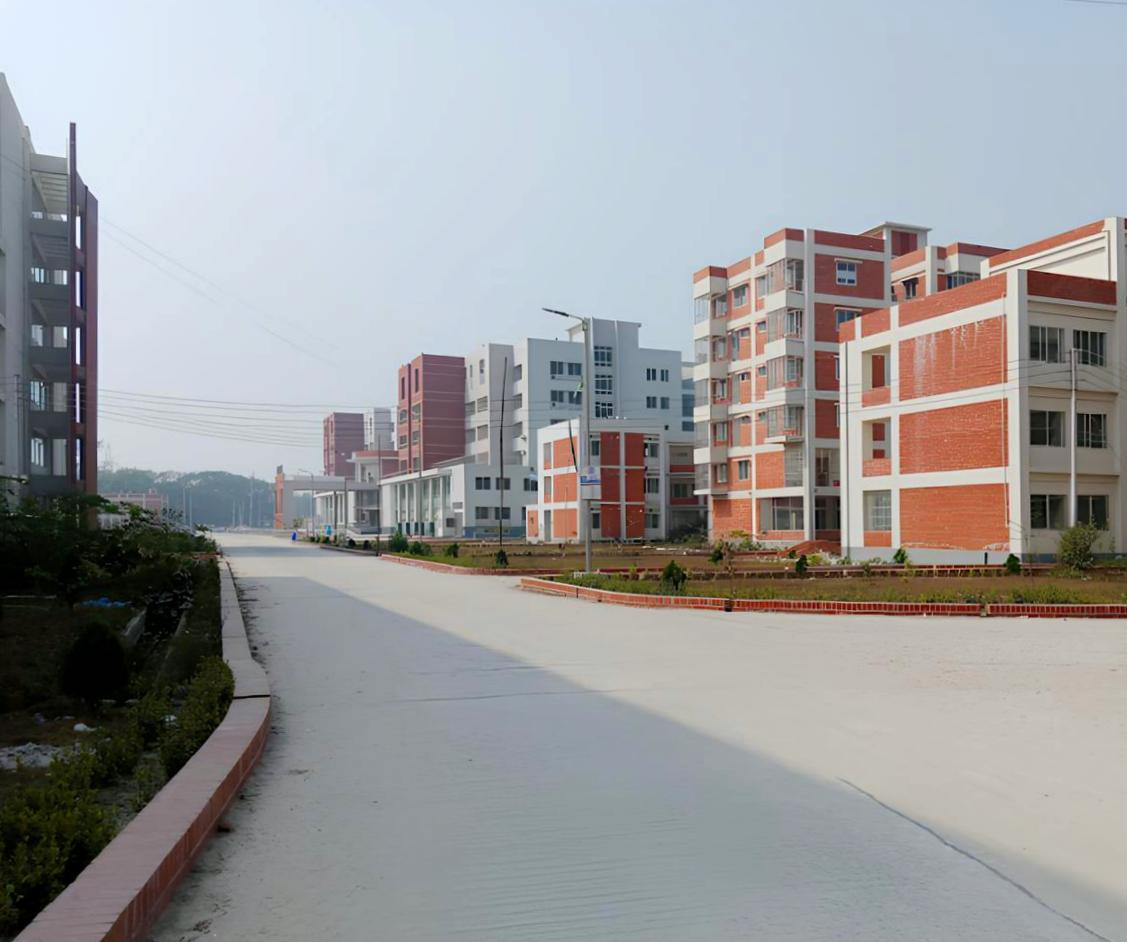
SjMC Campus

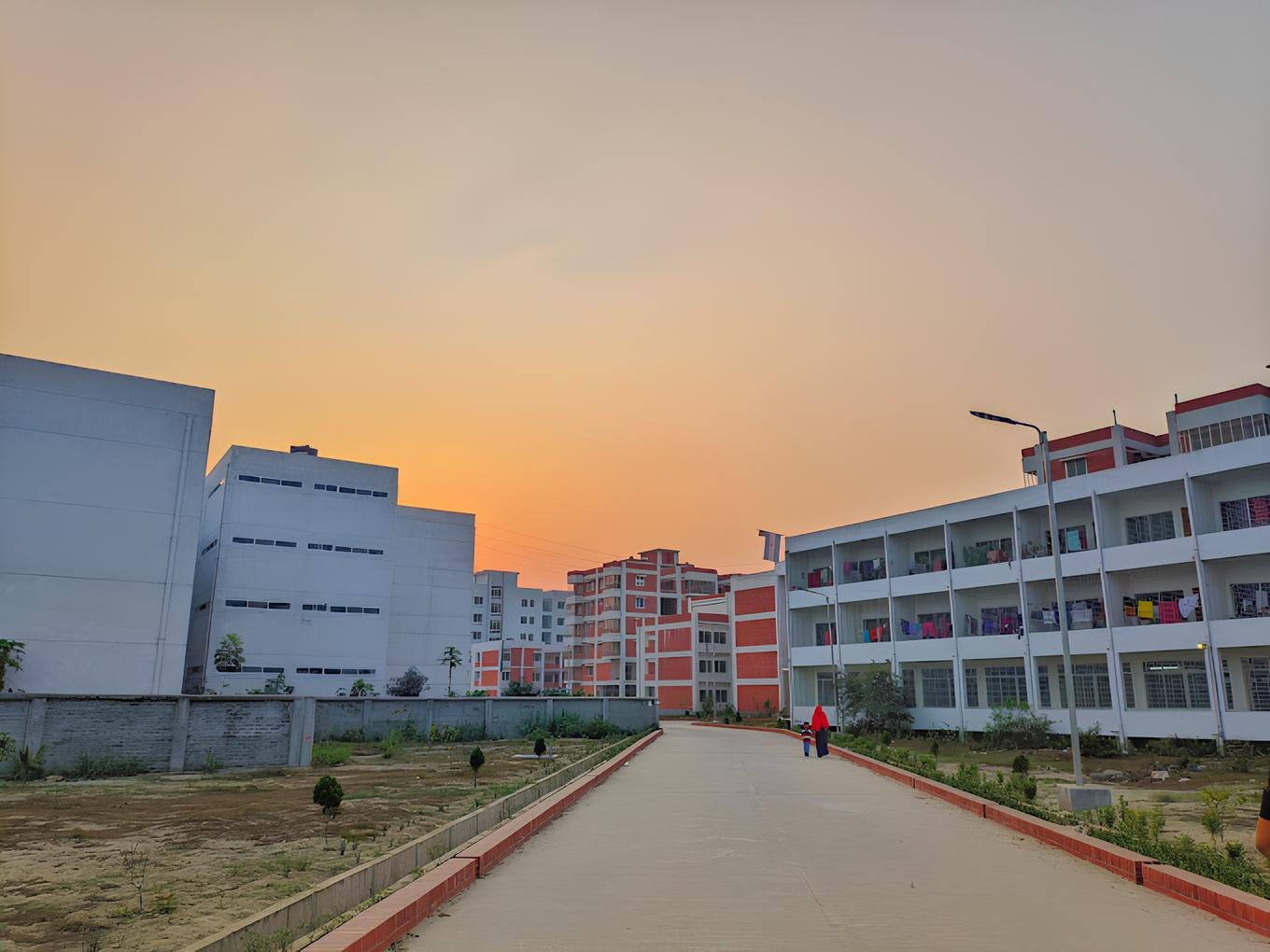
SjMC Campus

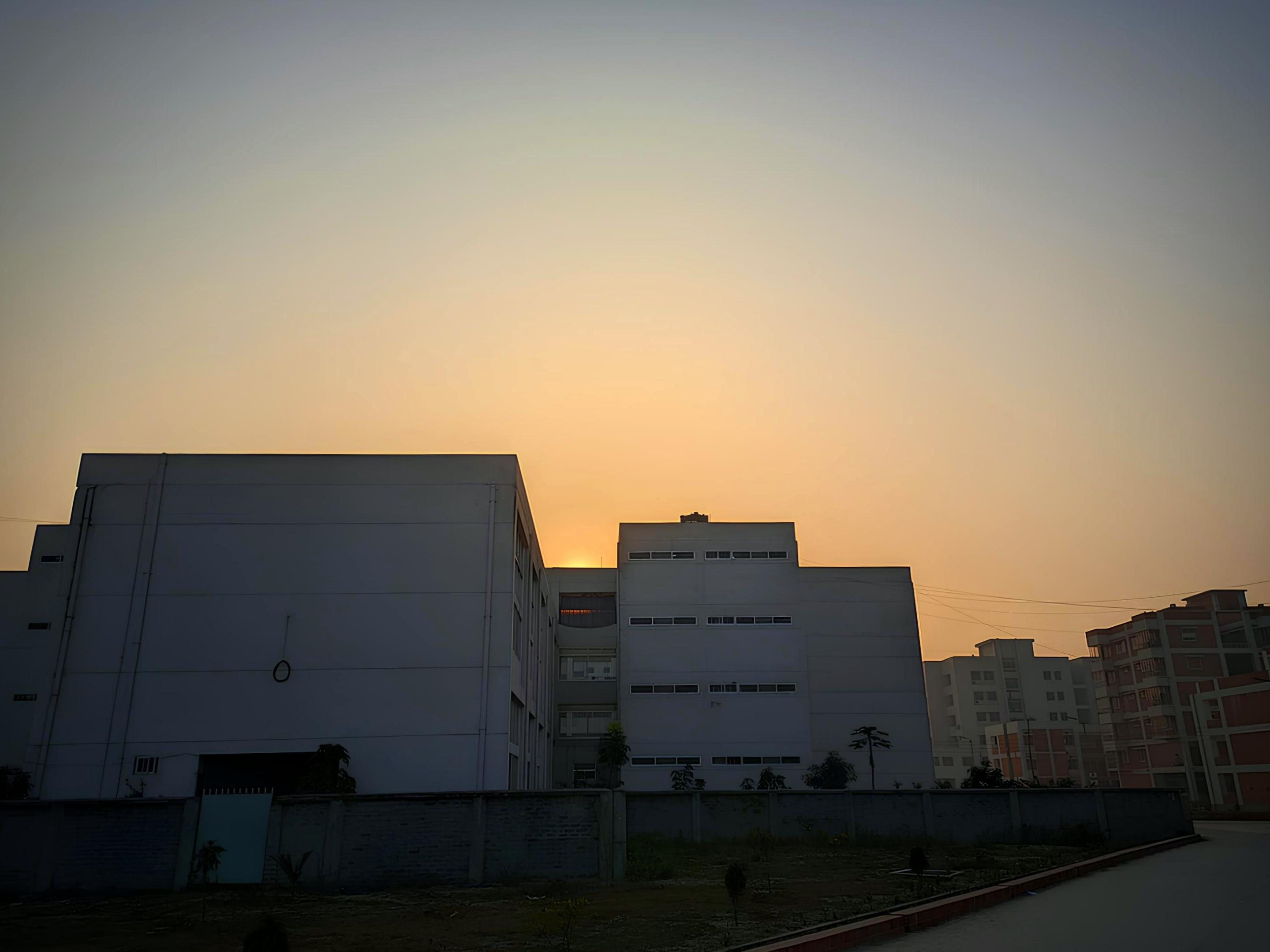
SjMC Campus

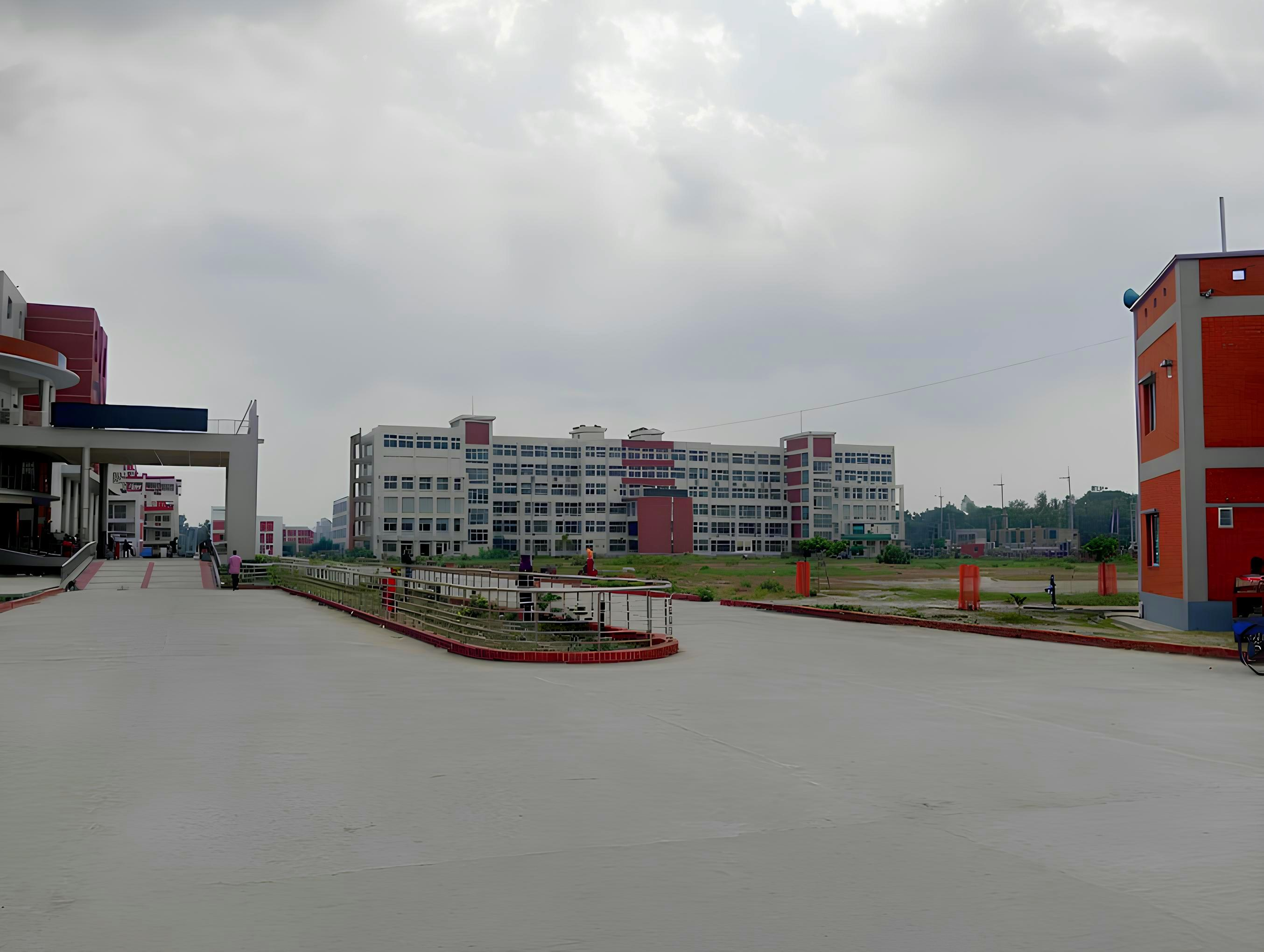
SjMC Campus

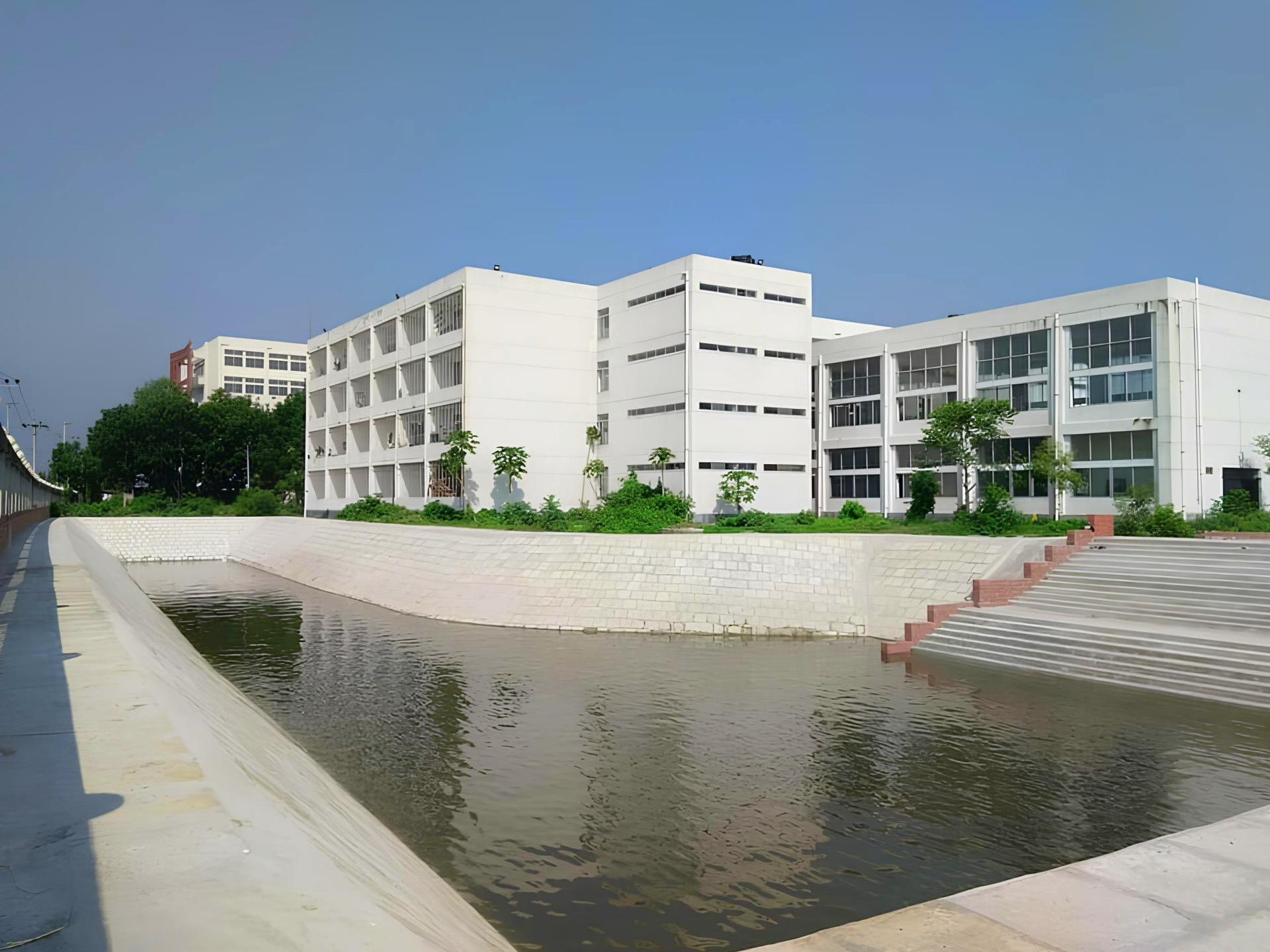
SjMC Campus

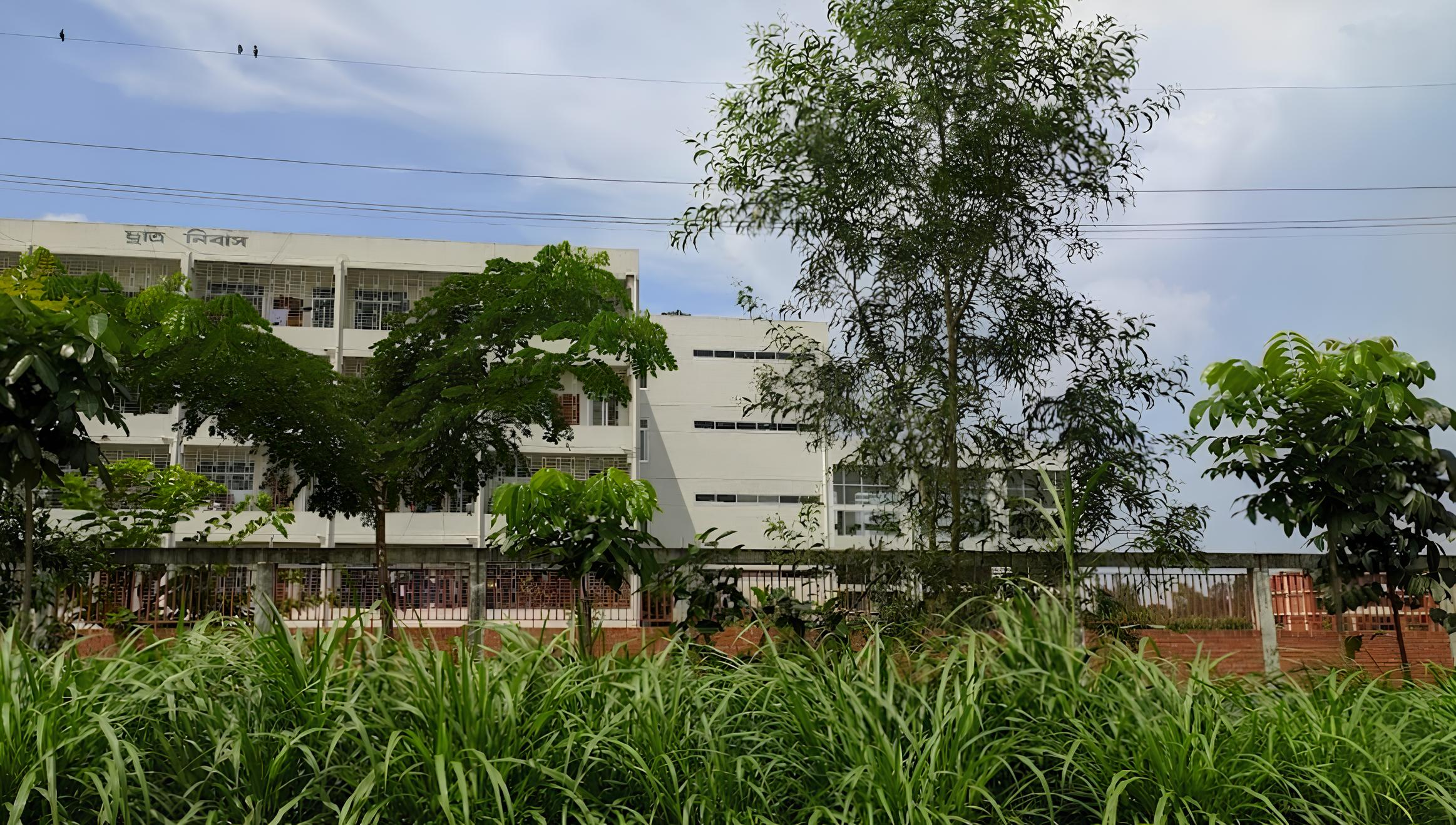
SjMC Campus

== See also ==
- List of medical colleges in Bangladesh
