= Sheikh Hasina Medical College =

Sheikh Hasina Medical College may refer to:

- Jamalpur Medical College, a government medical college established in 2014 in Jamalpur, Bangladesh
- Tangail Medical College, a government medical college established in 2014 in Tangail, Bangladesh
- Habiganj Medical College, a government medical college established in 2017 in Habiganj, Bangladesh
