= Tairunnessa Memorial Medical College =

- তায়রুন্নেছা মেমোরিয়াল মেডিকেল কলেজ
- Type: Private medical school
- Established: 2002
- Academic affiliations: University of Dhaka
- Chairman: Jahanara Hoque
- Principal: Dr Ranajit Mallick
- Academic staff: 143
- Students: 700
- Location: Konia, Gazipur Sadar Upazila, Gazipur District, Bangladesh; 23.9303°N 90.3888°E
- Campus: Urban
- Language: English
- Website: tmmch.com

Tairunnessa Memorial Medical College (TMMC) (Bengali: তায়রুন্নেছা মেমোরিয়াল মেডিকেল কলেজ) is a private medical school in Bangladesh, established in 2002. It is an institution of the Tairunnessa Memorial Medical Centre.

== Academics ==
It offers a five-year course of study leading to a Bachelor of Medicine, Bachelor of Surgery (MBBS) degree. A one-year internship after graduation is compulsory for all graduates. The degree is recognised by the Bangladesh Medical and Dental Council, Medical Council of India, Nepal Medical Council, Maldives Medical and Dental Council, Bhutan Medical and Health council. It has affiliation with University of Dhaka.

== History ==
M Shamsul Hoque was born in January 1943 in Hamidpur, Rajnagar in Moulvibazar District. He helped the religious minorities to flee the country with a small ship he owned. As a result, he was wanted by the Pakistani army in 1971. His elder brother, Mr Mohammed Fazlul Haque, based in the UK, established a School named Tairunnessa Girls' High School in Balaganj in 1977, as having daughters, wanted facilities where girls could study to a high level.

Tairunnessa Memorial Medical Center started as a small outpatient department at Konia, Gazipur District in 1995 which over the years has turned into a hospital and research center; TMMC Hospital, a 500-bed hospital complex, a 9 storied college building and an administrative block, a ladies' hostel & boys' hostel.

== Recognition ==
Tairunnessa Memorial Medical College is listed in the World Directory of Medical Schools, published by the World Health Organization (WHO). World Directory of Medical Schools recognition allow TMMC medical students/ graduates to apply for USMLE examination by ECFMG for employment and for post-graduate training in the United States and Canada as well as can apply for PLAB, AMC and NZREX examinations.

== See also ==
- List of medical colleges in Bangladesh
