= Manikganj Medical College =

Government medical college in Manikganj, Bangladesh

- মানিকগঞ্জ মেডিকেল কলেজ
- Former names: Colonel Maleque Medical College, Manikganj
- Type: Public medical school
- Established: 2014
- Academic affiliations: University of Dhaka
- Principal: Md. Zakir Hossain
- Students: 409 (currently running 9th batch)
- Undergraduates: 409
- Postgraduates: 0
- Doctoral students: 0
- Location: Manikganj, Manikganj District, Bangladesh; 23.8692°N 90.0006°E
- Campus: Urban (22 Acres)
- Language: English

Manikganj Medical College (Bengali: মানিকগঞ্জ মেডিকেল কলেজ) is a government medical school in Bangladesh, established in 2014. It is located in Manikganj city, 50 km west to the capital city of Dhaka. The college is affiliated with the University of Dhaka under the faculty of Medicine. Academic activities began on 26 January 2015 with 51 students. The first academic activities started at the Manikganj Nursing College campus, and moved to its permanent campus on 2020 in Dighi, Manikganj sadar, 1.5 km north to the Dhaka-Aricha highway.

== History ==
In the year of 2014–2015, Bangladesh government approved to establish 6 new medical colleges at Manikganj, Sirajganj, Jamalpur, Patuakhali, Tangail and Rangamati with a view to improving the healthcare services throughout the country. In 2017, it was renamed to its current title. It was named after Colonel M. A. Malek, a former mayor of Dhaka City Corporation and minister of the Ministry of Textiles and Jute, Bangladesh. It offers 5 years of MBBS course and admits 75 students every year. Zakir Hossain was appointed principal in 2021.

== Admission ==
The admission process of undergraduate MBBS course for all government medical colleges in Bangladesh is conducted centrally by the Director of Medical Education under DGHS under the Ministry of Health. The test comprises a written MCQ exam, which is held simultaneously in all government medical colleges on the same day throughout the country. Candidates are selected for admission based on national merit, district quotas, freedom fighter quotas, tribal quotas etc. For foreign students, admission process is through the embassy of Bangladesh in their respective countries. The academic calendar for different years is maintained by the respective departments. The admission test consists of a written MCQ exam.

== Examination and affiliation ==
Manikganj Medical College is affiliated with the University of Dhaka. The students receive their MBBS degrees from the University of Dhaka after completing 5 year of study and passing the final professional MBBS examination. This college is directly governed by Bangladesh Medical and Dental Council (BMDC) - an affiliation of the Ministry of Health.

The professional examinations are held under the university and results are given thereby. Internal examinations are also taken on regular intervals namely items, card completions, terms end and regular assessments.

== See also ==
- List of medical colleges in Bangladesh
