= Dhaka Central International Medical College =

Coordinates: 23.7736°N 90.3615°E

Dhaka Central International Medical College is a private medical school in Mohammadpur Thana, Bangladesh, established in 2011. The college is affiliated with University of Dhaka as a constituent college.

== Academics ==
The college offers a five-year course of study, approved by the Bangladesh Medical and Dental Council (BMDC), leading to a Bachelor of Medicine, Bachelor of Surgery (MBBS) degree from Dhaka University. After passing the final professional examination, there is a compulsory one-year internship. The internship is a prerequisite for obtaining registration from the BMDC to practice medicine.College website
