= Shahabuddin Medical College =

- সাহাবউদ্দিন মেডিকেল কলেজ
- Type: Private medical school
- Established: 2003
- Academic affiliations: University of Dhaka
- Chairman: Mohammad Sahab Uddin
- Principal: Professor Dr.Khademul Azad
- Academic staff: 100
- Students: 500
- Location: Gulshan, Dhaka, Bangladesh; 23.789524275274154°N 90.41971860939715°E
- Campus: Urban
- Language: English
- Website: shahabuddinmedical.org/college

Shahabuddin Medical College (Bengali: সাহাবউদ্দিন মেডিকেল কলেজ, romanized: Śāhābuddina mēḍikēla kalēja) is a medical college of Bangladesh. It is located at Gulshan of capital city Dhaka. Established in 2003, this institute is one of the private medical colleges of Bangladesh. It offers a program leading to an MBBS degree. The college is affiliated to University of Dhaka.

== History ==
Shahabuddin Medical College was established in 2003, and the college began admitting students. Academic classes started on 18 April which is celebrated as "SMC DAY". The 1st year, beginning class, or "Batch", was named SM-01.

== Principals ==
Serial	Name	Period
1.	A.K.M. Salahuddin	2002-09-01 – 2005-11-30
2.	Md. Abdul Kadir Khan	2005-12-01 – 2011-08-15
3.	Sk Akbar Hossain	2011-08-16 – 2013-06-30
4.	Sk Akbar Hossain	2013-07-01 – 2016-06-21
5.	Md. Jafarullah	2017-03-01 - 2021-02-28
6.	Md. Abdul Jalil Ansari	2021-03-01 - 2021-10-23
7.	Md. Ruhul Amin	2021-10-24 - 2023-09-23
8.	Dr. Aziz	2023-09-24 - 05-08-2024
9.	Prof.Dr.Khademul Azad	06-08-2024 - Present

== Batches ==
=== Batches of SMC ===
Each entering Class of the college, which is known as a "Batch", is designated by the prefix 'SM' followed by the batch number. SM is a short form of "Shahabuddin Medical"

Batches
Batch	Session of admission	Number of Students	Position
SM-01	2003-2004	50	Graduated
SM-02	2004-2005	87	Graduated
SM-03	2005-2006	100	Graduated
SM-04	2006-2007	95	Graduated
SM-05	2007-2008	50	Graduated
SM-06	2008-2009	75	Graduated
SM-07	2009-2010	76	Graduated
SM-08	2010-2011	76	Graduated
SM-09	2011-2012	80	Graduated
SM-10	2012-2013	85	Graduated
SM-11	2013-2014	70	Graduated
SM-12	2014-2015	95	Graduated
SM-13	2015-2016	100+	Graduated
SM-14	2016-2017	82	Graduated
SM-15	2017-2018	91	Graduated
SM-16	2018-2019	34	Graduated
SM-17	2019-2020	95	Intern Doctor
SM-18	2020-2021	70	Final prof. Candidate
SM-19	2021-2022	90	5th year
SM- 20	2022-2023		4th year
SM- 21	2023-2024		3rd year
SM-22	2024-2025		2nd year
SM-23	2025-2026		1st year
