= Naogaon Medical College =

Coordinates: 24.8231°N 88.9384°E

Naogaon Medical College, Naogaon
- নওগাঁ মেডিকেল কলেজ, নওগাঁ
- Other names: NMC
- Type: Government Medical College
- Established: 2018
- Academic affiliations: Rajshahi Medical University
- Principal: Professor Dr. Md. Muktar Hossain
- Academic staff: 70
- Students: 250
- Location: Naogaon, Bangladesh
- Campus: Urban
- Language: English
- Website: naogaonmedical.naogaon.gov.bd

Naogaon Medical College is a government medical school in Naogaon, Bangladesh, founded in 2018 and affiliated with Rajshahi Medical University. The class of the first batch of 50 students was commenced on 10 January 2019, on its temporary campus of Naogaon Sadar Hospital (250 Bedded General Hospital, Naogaon).
