= Navy Medical College, Chattogram =

Bangladesh Navy controlled private medical college

- নেভি মেডিকেল কলেজ, চট্টগ্রাম
- Logo of NMCC
- Other names: NMCC
- Former names: Noubahini Medical College
- Type: Navy medical college
- Established: 2024
- Academic affiliations: Bangladesh University of Professionals
- Principal: Surg Cdr Mohammad Tarequl Islam
- Students: 300
- Location: Chittagong, Bangladesh; 22.2282973°N 91.7999325°E
- Language: English
- Website: nmcc.edu.bd

Navy Medical College, Chattogram (NMCC) is a medical college, established in 2024 at BNS Issa Khan, Chattogram, Bangladesh. It is affiliated with Bangladesh University of Professionals.

It offers a five-year course of study leading to a Bachelor of Medicine, Bachelor of Surgery (MBBS) degree. A one-year internship after graduation is compulsory for all graduates. The degree is recognised by the Bangladesh Medical and Dental Council.

== Controlling authority ==
The controlling authority of Navy Medical College Chattogram is shown below:

1. Ministry of Defence (Bangladesh)
2. Ministry of Health & Family Welfare
3. Bangladesh University of Professionals (BUP)
4. Bangladesh Medical and Dental Council (BM&DC)
5. Directorate General of Medical Education

== Campus ==
It was established at BNS Issa Khan, Chattogram.
