= Thakurgaon Medical College =

- Type: Public Medical College
- Established: 2026
- Academic affiliations: Rajshahi Medical University
- Location: Thakurgaon
- Campus: Urban
- Language: English

Thakurgaon Medical College is a proposed government medical college located in Thakurgaon District, . It was officially approved on 15 May 2026.

== History ==
In 1st January 2026 government approved to establish a medical college in Thakurgaon District. In May 14, 2026 President of Bangladesh signed the bill. And the following day the government published the gazette and notified that the following education year, student will be admitted into this medical college.
