= Medical College for Women and Hospital =

Private medical college and hospital in Bangladesh

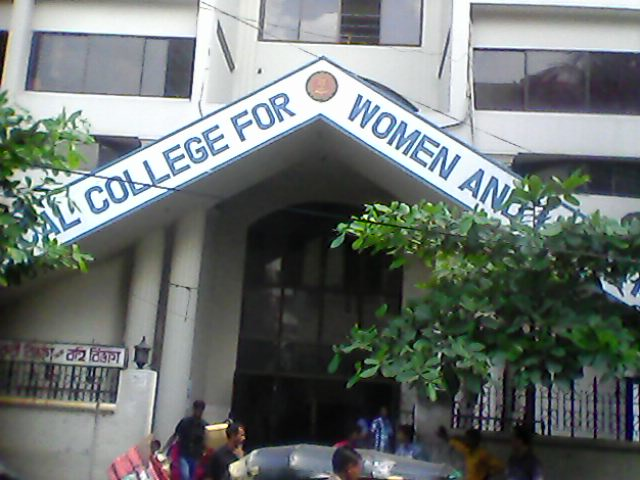
- Entrance to the Medical College
- Type: Private medical school
- Established: 1992
- Academic affiliations: University of Dhaka
- Principal: Prof. Dr. Sheikh Firoz Kabir(Major Rtd.)
- Academic staff: 108
- Location: Uttara Model Town, Dhaka North, Bangladesh; 23.8584°N 90.4007°E
- Campus: Urban
- Language: English
- Website: mcwh.edu.bd medicalcollegeforwomen.edu.bd

Medical College for Women and Hospital (Medical College) is a Bangladeshi private medical college for women. It has two academic campuses in Uttara, Dhaka, one in Sector - 1 and the other in Uttarkhan. The college is affiliated with the Dhaka University as a constituent college.

== Faculty ==
The college has 121 faculty members organized in 20 departments representing different fields of medical science. It is led by Principal Sheikh Firoz Kabir.

== Board of trustees ==
Murals of the four founding BOT members at the entrance

The college's board of trustees consists of the four founding members, with the former President of Bangladesh professor A.Q.M. Badruddoza Chowdhury as the chairman, late National Professor M R Khan as the executive chairman, professor A M Mujibul Haq as the member secretary, and late professor Suraiya Jabeen as the founder treasurer.

== Recognition ==
The college is recognised by the Bangladesh Medical and Dental Council. MCW&H is listed in the World Directory of Medical Schools formerly maintained by the World Health Organization and now maintained as the Avicenna Directory for Medicine. This listing entitles the graduates of MCW&H to be recognized all over the world. Graduates of MCW&H are eligible for limited registration with the General Medical Council of United Kingdom. They are also eligible to take the United States Medical Licensing Examination. The degree is also recognized by the Medical Council of India. The degree is also recognized by the California Medical Board.
