= Community Based Medical College Bangladesh =

Private medical college in Mymensingh, Bangladesh

- কমিউনিটি বেজড মেডিকেল কলেজ বাংলাদেশ
- Type: Private
- Established: 1995
- Affiliations: University of Dhaka
- Students: 800
- Location: Mymensingh, Mymensingh Division, Bangladesh; 24.669100°N 90.404500°E
- Campus: 22 acre
- Website: www.cbmcb.org

Community Based Medical College is a private medical college located in Mymensingh district. It has been run by Community Health Foundation Bangladesh since 1995. It offers a 5-year undergraduate MBBS course with a 1-year internship.

== Location ==
It was established in 1995 on 13 acres of land in the Winarpar area of Churkhai, 10 km from Mymensingh city.

== Infrastructure ==
A 650-bed hospital has been built with the college for the training of students. There are 6 lecture halls, 12 tutorial halls, 6 laboratories, 4 museums, 4 reading rooms, 3 seminar halls and a library.
