= Jamalpur Medical College =

Government Medical College in Bangladesh

- জামালপুর মেডিকেল কলেজ
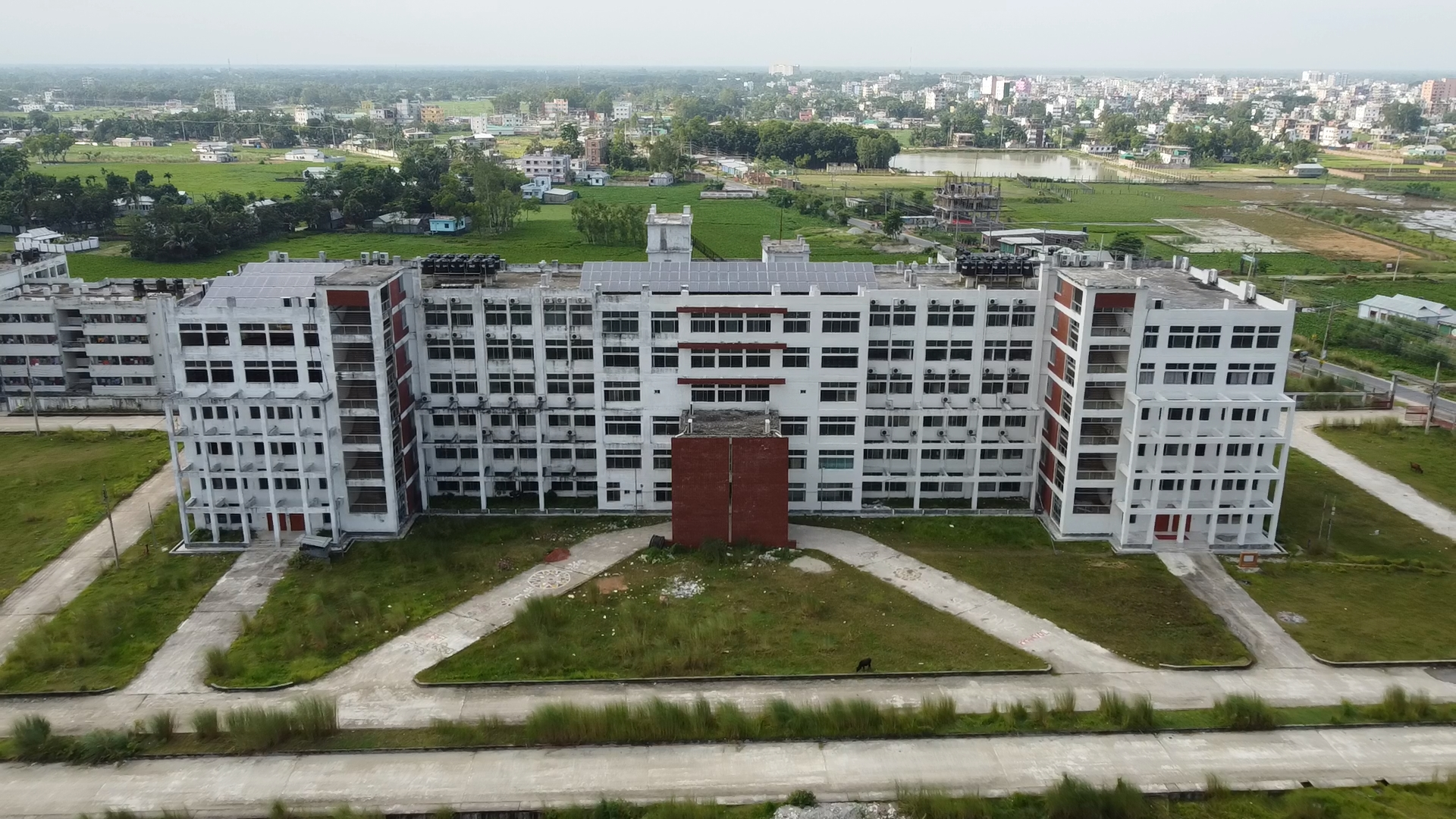
- Former names: Sheikh Hasina Medical College
- Motto: সত্য, জ্ঞান ও সেবায় সর্বাগ্রে
- Type: Public Medical College
- Established: 2014
- Academic affiliations: University of Dhaka
- Principal: Md. Abul Kalam Azad
- Students: 325
- Location: Jamalpur, Bangladesh
- Campus: Urban, 30 acres
- Language: English
- Website: https://jpmc.gov.bd/
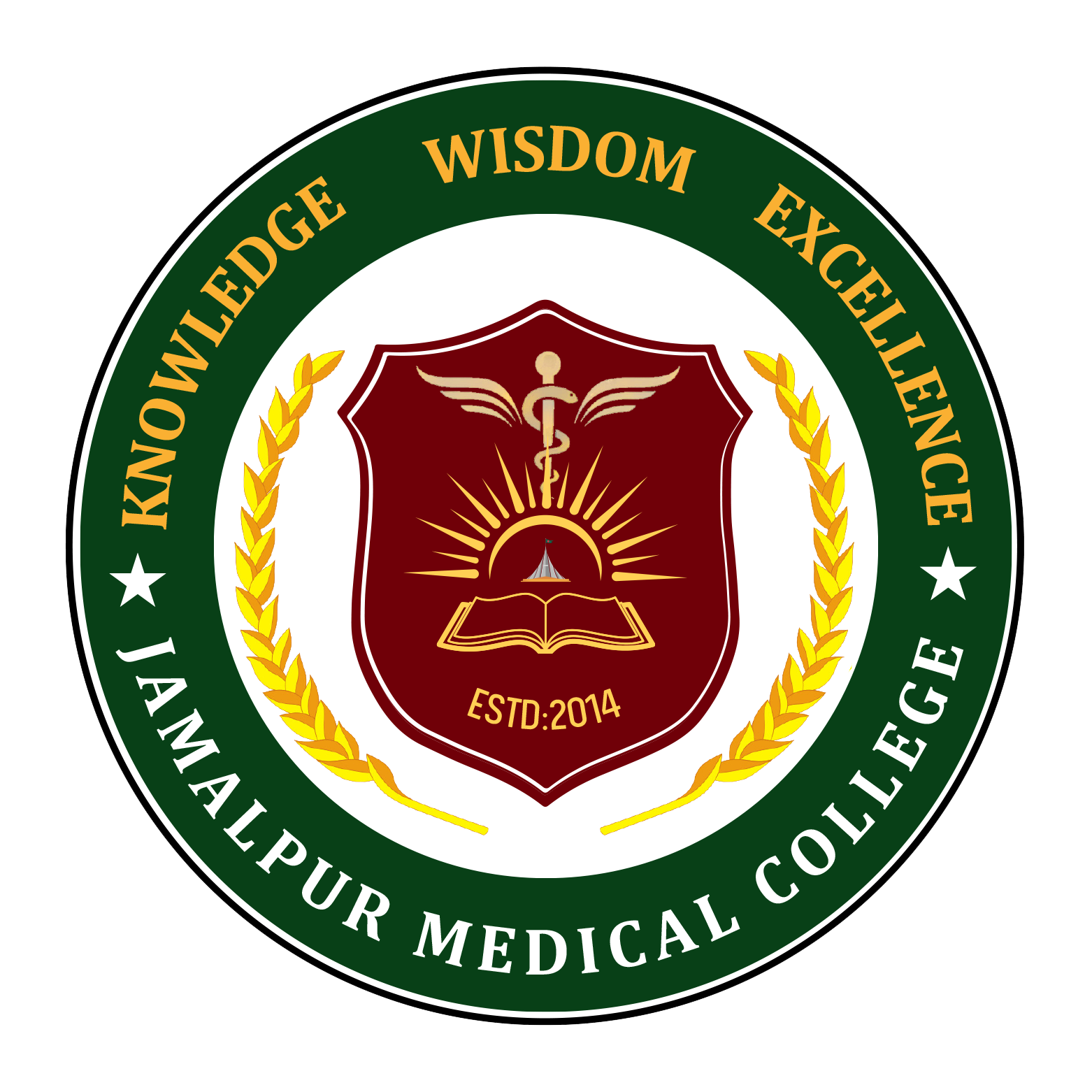

Jamalpur Medical College (Bengali: জামালপুর মেডিকেল কলেজ) is a government medical college in Bangladesh, established in 2014. It is located in Jamalpur. It is affiliated with University of Dhaka as a constituent college.

It has a five-year medical education course leading to an MBBS. One-year internship after graduation is compulsory for all graduates. The college is affiliated with the University of Dhaka, and the degree is recognized by the Bangladesh Medical and Dental Council.

== History ==
In 2014, Bangladesh government approved to establish six new medical colleges at Tangail, Jamalpur, Manikganj, Sirajganj, Patuakhali and Rangamati with a view to improve the healthcare services in the country.

On October 30, 2024, the Ministry of Health and Family Welfare changed the name of the medical college to "Jamalpur Medical College" from Sheikh Hasina Medical College.

== Organization and administration ==
Jamalpur Medical College is affiliated with the University of Dhaka. The students receive MBBS degree from the University of Dhaka after completion of 5th year of study and passing the final Professional MBBS examination.

This college is directly governed by Bangladesh Medical and Dental Council BMDC - an affiliation of Ministry of Health.

The professional examinations are held under the university and results are given thereby. Internal Examinations are also taken on regular interval namely Card completions, Terms end and regular assessments.

== Academics ==
The admission process of undergraduate MBBS course for all government medical colleges in Bangladesh is conducted centrally by the Director of Medical Education under DGHS under the Ministry of Health. The test comprises a written MCQ exam, which is held simultaneously in all government medical colleges on the same day throughout the country. Candidates are selected for admission based on national merit and district, whether they are sons or daughters of freedom fighters, and to fill tribal quotas. For foreign students, admission is through the embassy of Bangladesh in their respective countries. The academic calendar for different years is maintained by respective departments. The admission test consists of the written MCQ exam.

== Principals ==
- M. A. Wakil
- Saleh Iqbal
- Shyamol Kumar Saha
- ASM Iqbal Hossain Chowdhury
- Md. Abul Kalam Azad (present)
