= Professional and Linguistic Assessments Board =

Test for international medical graduates to practice in the UK

The Professional and Linguistic Assessments Board (PLAB) test provides the main route for International Medical Graduates (IMGs) to demonstrate that they have the necessary skills and knowledge to practise medicine in the United Kingdom (UK). PLAB is a two part assessment that overseas doctors (or international medical graduates), from outside the European Economic Area and Switzerland, usually need to pass before they can legally practise medicine in the UK. It is conducted by the General Medical Council of the United Kingdom. The test is designed to assess the depth of knowledge and level of medical and communication skills possessed by the international medical graduates. The PLAB blueprint sets out what candidates are expected to demonstrate in the test and beyond.

The PLAB test has two parts:

Part 1: Consists of a multiple choice format examination paper with 180 SBAs (One Hundred Eighty Single Best Answer questions with 5 options and one SBA) lasting 3 hours. This is a paper-based exam which is answered on a sheet provided by the invigilator (not computer-based). This part is conducted in a number of countries including Australia, Canada, United Kingdom, Bangladesh, Egypt, India, Pakistan, Nigeria and Sri Lanka.

Part 2: Consists of an objective structured clinical examination (OSCE). This part is only available in Manchester. It consists of 16 clinical stations. All the stations are eight minutes long, plus two minutes reading time. The standard of both parts of the PLAB exam is set at the level of competence of a doctor at the start of Foundation Year 2 (F2) in the Foundation Programme.

== Eligibility criteria ==
One needs the following to be eligible to take the PLAB 1 exam:

- It is necessary to have a primary medical degree from an institution that is listed in the World Directory of Medical Schools.
- Passed the academic IELTS modules with a minimum overall score of 7.5 and a minimum score of 7.0 in each of the four language skills or passed the Medicine OET modules with a minimum overall grade of B and a minimum grade of B in each of the four language skills (writing, speaking, listening and reading).

As long as it is a post-graduate internship, one can take the PLAB 1 without having finished one's house job or internship. If one's internship counts toward one's graduation (i.e., is pre-graduate), one cannot take PLAB 1 until one has finished it.

The Internship criteria for appearing in PLAB 1 exam are as follows:

- Minimum 12 months
- Absents no more than 20 days
- Must include at least three months in Medicine and three in surgery

== Dates ==
PLAB 1 is held four times an year. The notifications for the upcoming dates are released initially on Twitter handle of GMC and later published on their website. This exam can be taken in the UK as well 15 other countries.

On the other hand, PLAB 2 is held only in Manchester and the dates are often frequently available.

== Pass rates ==
The pass rates on the first try for PLAB 1 from September 2018 to August 2021 are 71.6% for males and 72.4% for females, which is very similar. For PLAB 2, females have considerably greater pass rates 69.9% than males have 54.3%.

For PLAB 1, the passing scores are usually 115–120. The passing marks are decided based on the Angoff method (based on a discussion of the difficulties involved in credentialing and their judgement of the examination, the Angoff method permits experienced judges to decide on an acceptable pass grade for an examination). An additional standard of error is also included by the GMC in this criterion.

Overall, the year-wise passing rates for PLAB 1 exam were as follows:

Year	Pass Rate
2018	69.3% (5,239 out of 7,559)
2019	63.1% (7,014 out of 11,118)
2020	69.7% (7,384 out of 10,601)
2021	74.1% (7,728 out of 10,431)
2022	70.9% (10,259 out of 14,470)
