= Rajshahi Medical University =

Public medical university in Bangladesh

- Logo of Rajshahi Medical University
- Type: Government medical university
- Established: 2017; 9 years ago
- Affiliations: UGC
- Chancellor: President Mohammed Shahabuddin
- Vice-Chancellor: Md. Jawadul Haque
- Location: Rajshahi, Bangladesh; 24.3758°N 88.5849°E
- Campus: Urban
- Language: English
- Website: www.rmu.edu.bd

Rajshahi Medical University is a public medical university in Rajshahi, Bangladesh. The organization is conducting the university's work in the Rajshahi Medical College by recruiting manpower.

== Background ==
Rajshahi Medical University, established in Rajshahi to supervise whether these 40 public and private medical institutions will be functioning properly. In this, Rajshahi Medical University will be responsible for the medical and dental colleges, nursing colleges, institute of health technology (IHT), medical education institutes.

== Faculties ==
The university administration's plan, as of 2018, was to have 9 faculties covering 85 disciplines.

== History ==
The administrative and academic activities of Rajshahi Medical University were officially started in the temporary office in 2017. Rajshahi Medical University was established with the objective of rapid implementation of education and medical activities and all government and private medical colleges, dental colleges, nursing colleges or institutes of Rajshahi, Rangpur divisions under the supervision of Medical University and proper supervision.

== List of vice-chancellors ==
- Masum Habib (April 2017 – April 2021)
- AZM Mostaque Hossain (May 2021 – September 2024)
- Md. Jawadul Haque (September 2024 – present)
