= Bangladesh Medical and Dental Council =

Government regulatory agency

Bangladesh Medical & Dental Council
- বাংলাদেশ মেডিকেল ও ডেন্টাল কাউন্সিল
- Logo of Bangladesh Medical and Dental Council
- Abbreviation: BMDC
- Formation: 9 April 1980; 46 years ago
- Type: Government Organisation
- Headquarters: 203, Shaheed Sayed Nazrul Islam Sarani (86, Bijoy Nagar), Dhaka-1000, Bangladesh
- President: Mohammad Saiful Islam
- Website: bmdc.org.bd

The Bangladesh Medical and Dental Council (BMDC) is the professional regulatory body that monitors the practice of medicine in Bangladesh. It was formed under the Bangladesh Medical Council Act. The law was enacted in 1973, hence it was also called the 1973 Act of Bangladesh Medical Council. The 1973 Act was repealed in 1980 and Bangladesh Medical & Dental Council Act was passed by the parliament on 9 April 1980.

It is located in the capital of Bangladesh, Dhaka in 203, Shaheed Sayed Nazrul Islam Sarani (86, Bijoy Nagar). Its function is to regulate the registration to MBBS & BDS doctors to practice medicine and dentistry in Bangladesh. It maintains the official register of medical practitioners, dental practitioner, and medical assistant practitioner within Bangladesh. Its chief responsibility is to "protect, promote and maintain the health and safety of the public" by controlling entry to the register, and suspending or removing members when necessary. It also sets the standards for medical colleges in Bangladesh. Unregistered, suspended or removed members are not allowed to practice medicine in Bangladesh.

The Bangladesh Medical and Dental Council is the regulatory authority and the custodian of medical and dental education in Bangladesh.

== See also ==
- List of medical schools in Bangladesh
- List of dental schools in Bangladesh
