= Sylhet =

Sylhet সিলেট (Bengali) ꠍꠤꠟꠐ (Sylheti) Jalalabad
- Metropolis
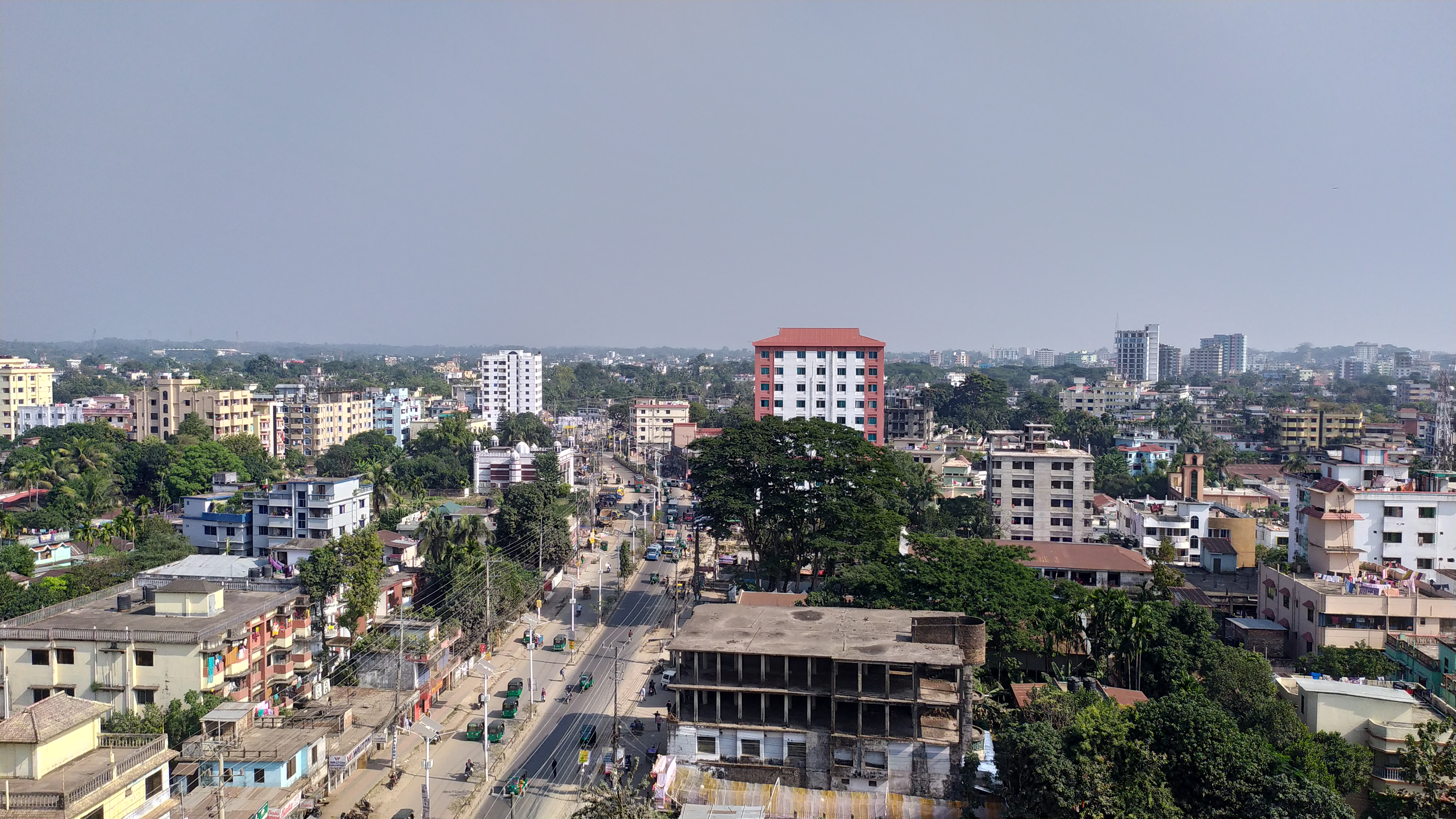
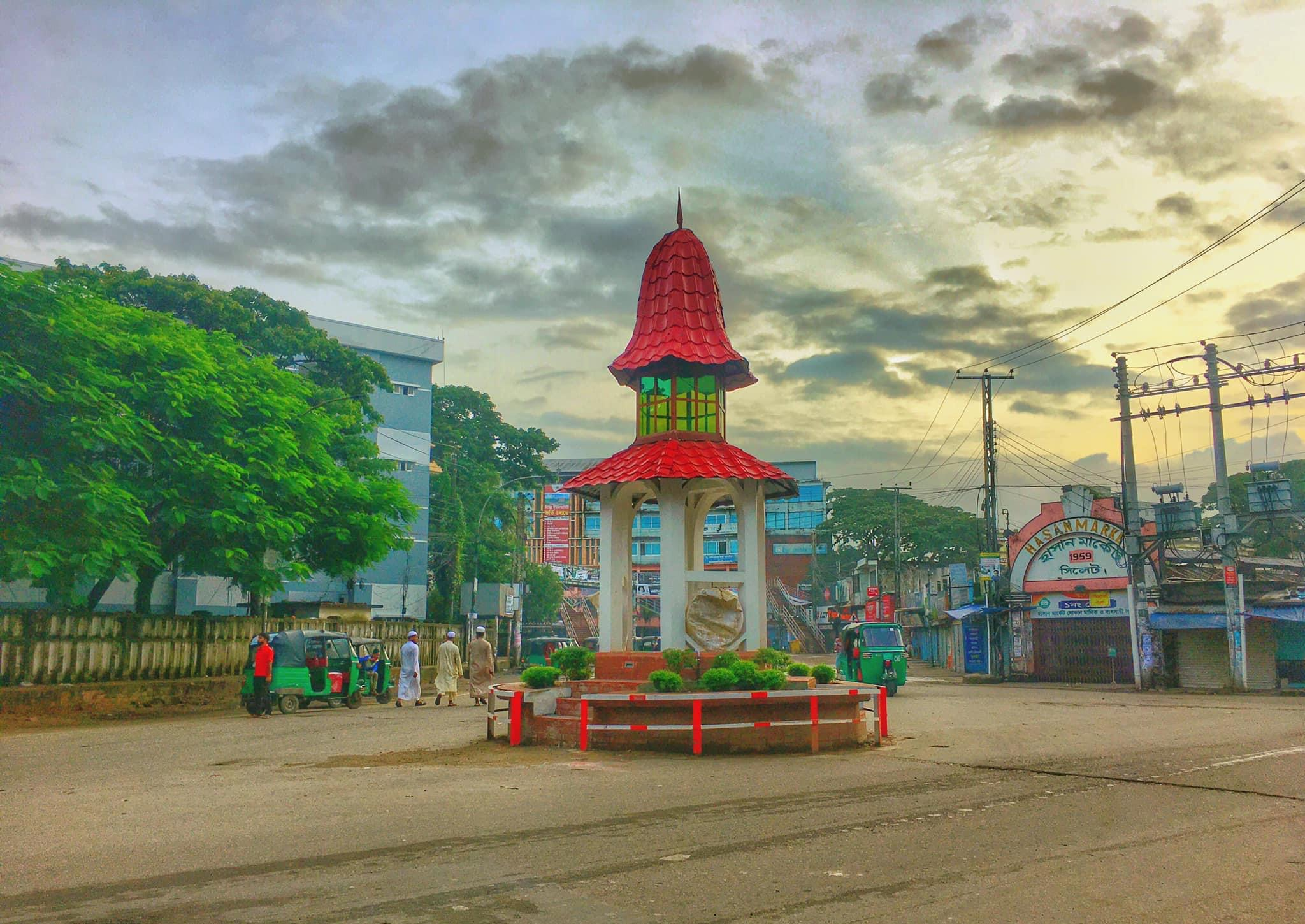
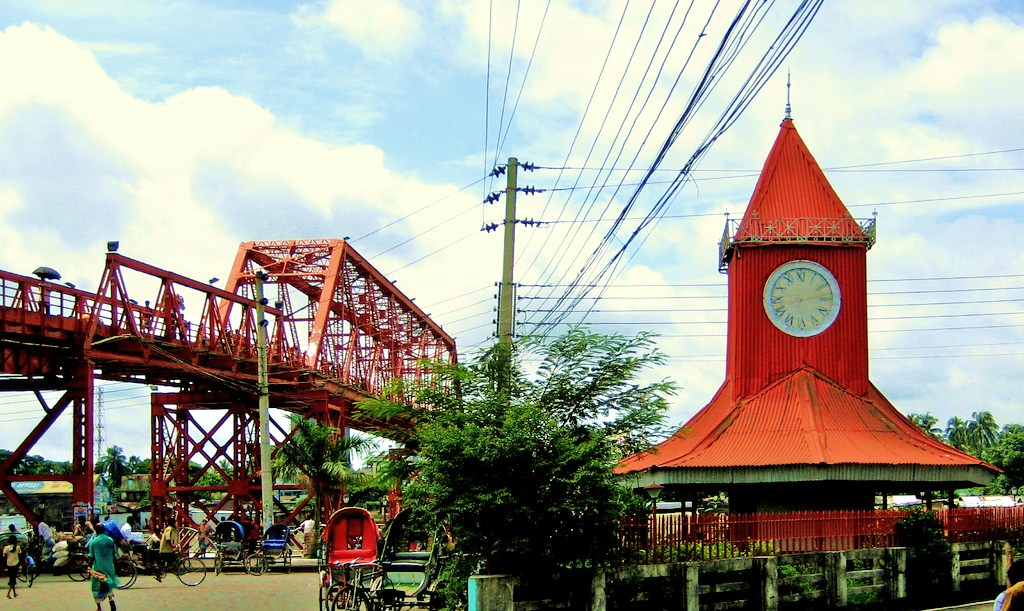
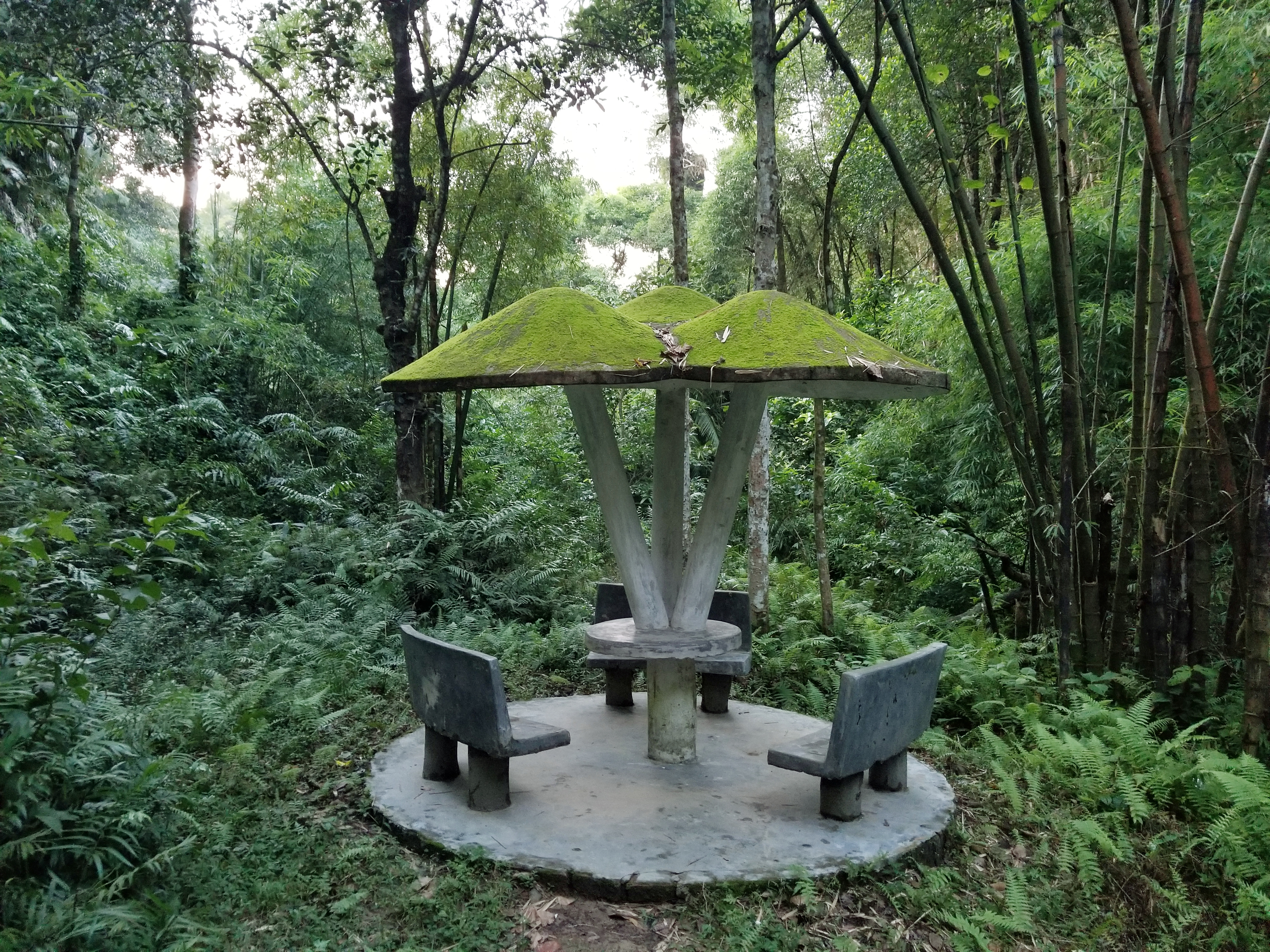
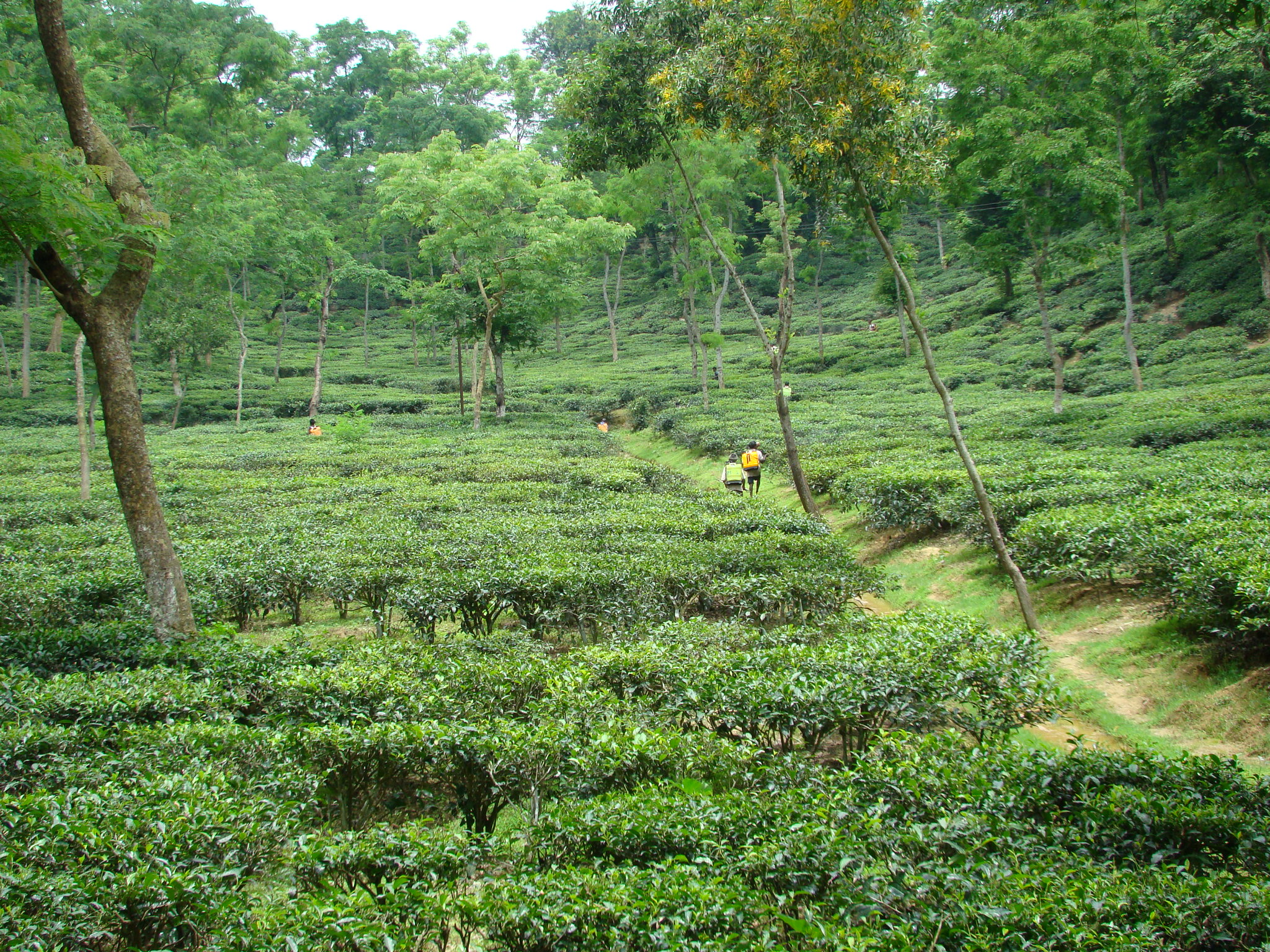
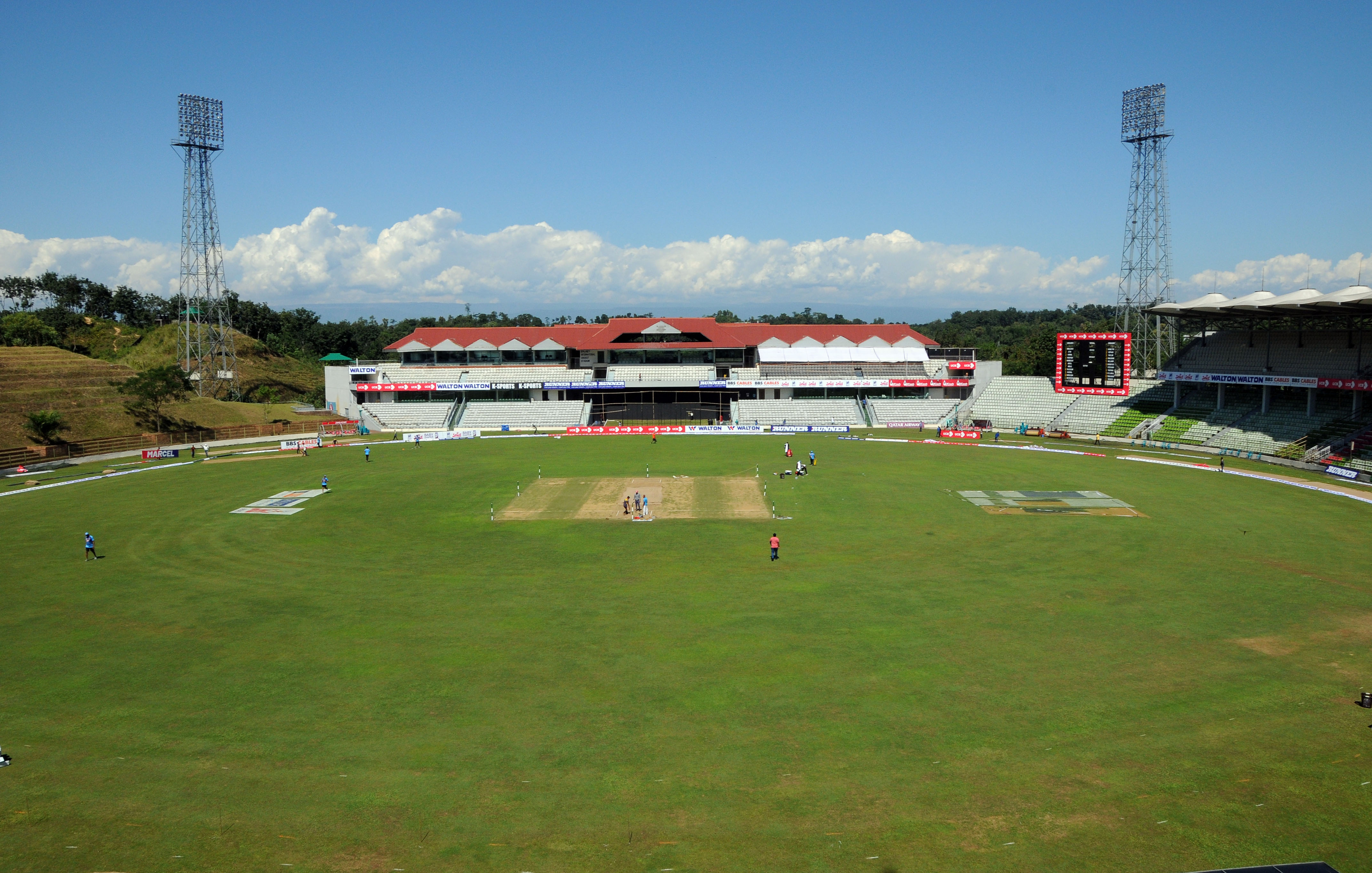
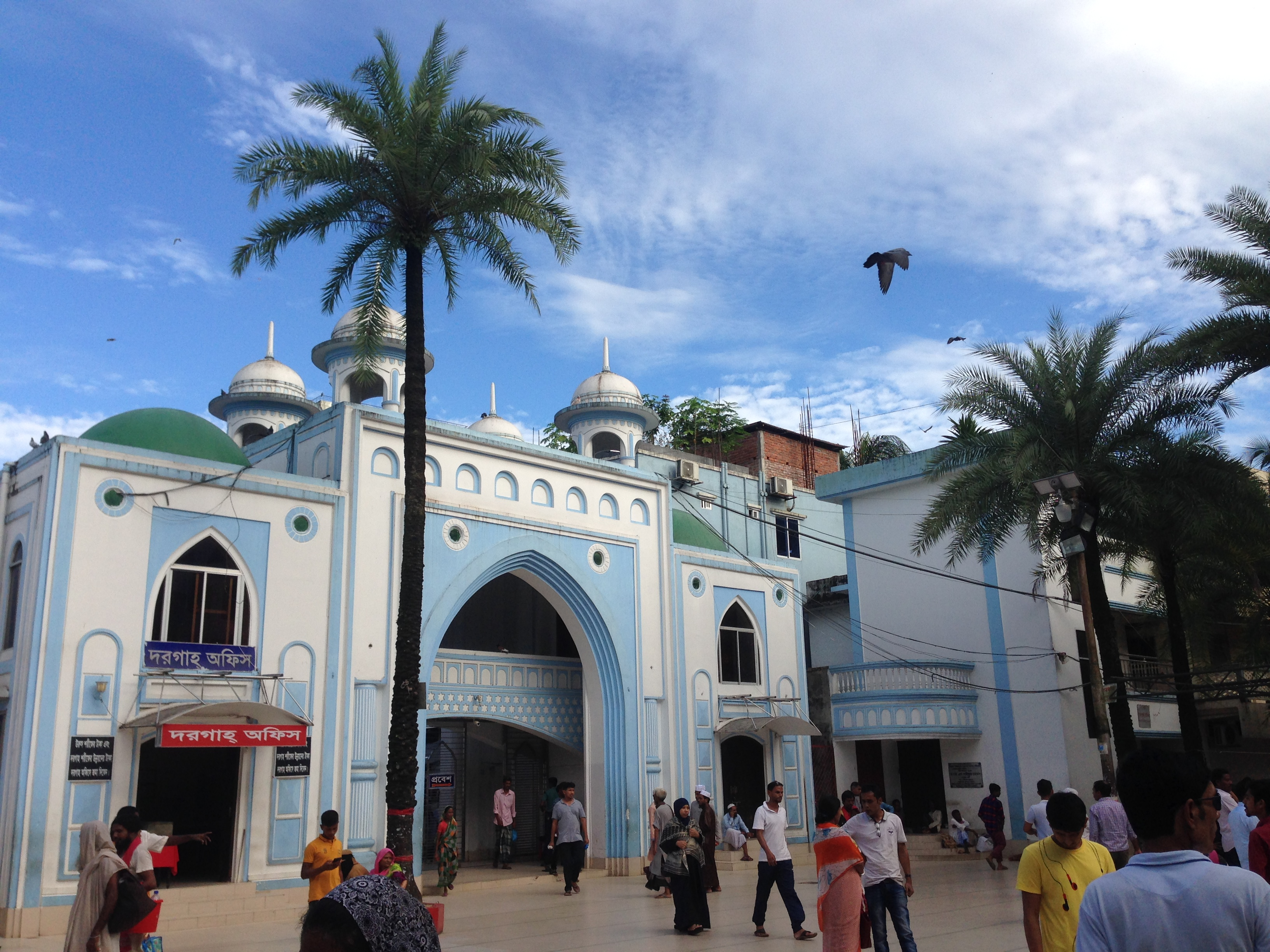
- Skyline City Point Keane Bridge and Ali Amjad's Clock Khadimnagar National Park Malnicherra Tea Garden Sylhet International Cricket Stadium Shah Jalal Dargah

- Location of Sylhet Sylhet (Bangladesh) Sylhet (South Asia) Sylhet (Asia)
- Coordinates: 24°54′N 91°52′E
- Country: Bangladesh
- Division: Sylhet Division
- District: Sylhet
- Municipal Board: 1867
- Sylhet City Corporation: 9 April 2001
- Metropolitan city: 31 March 2009

Government
  - Type: Mayor–Council
  - Body: Sylhet City Corporation
  - Administrator: Abdul Quiyum Choudhury
  - City Council: 42 constituencies
  - Parliament: 2 constituencies

Area
  - Urban: 79.5 km^{2} (30.7 sq mi)
  - Metro: 177.81 km^{2} (68.65 sq mi)
- Elevation: 35 m (115 ft)

Population (2022)
  - Urban: 532,839
  - Urban density: 6,700/km^{2} (17,400/sq mi)
  - Metro: 896,331
  - Metro density: 5,040.9/km^{2} (13,056/sq mi)
  - City rank: 9th in Bangladesh
  - Metro rank: 10th in Bangladesh
- Demonym: Sylheti

Languages
  - Official: Bengali
  - Regional: Sylheti
- Time zone: UTC+6 (Bangladesh Time)
- Postal code: 3100
- Calling code: +880 821
- National Calling Code: +880
- Calling Code: 0821
- UN/LOCODE: BD ZYL
- HDI (2023): 0.650 medium· 19th of 22
- Police: Sylhet Metropolitan Police
- International Airport: Osmani International Airport
- Metropolitan Planning Authority: Sylhet Development Authority
- Website: scc.gov.bd

Sylhet (Note: Bengali: সিলেট, romanized: Silēṭ, pronounced [sileʈ]; Sylheti: ꠍꠤꠟꠐ, romanized: Silôṭ, pronounced [sílɔʈ]) is a metropolitan city in the northeastern region of Bangladesh. It serves as the administrative centre for both the Sylhet District and the Sylhet Division. The city is situated on the banks of the Surma River and, as of 2025, the metro area population of Sylhet is estimated to be 1,033,000, reflecting a 3.4% increase from 2024.

Sylhet is known for its tea plantations and natural scenery. Sylhet is famous for the Ratargul Swamp Forest, one of the few freshwater swamp forests in Bangladesh. The region has been inhabited since ancient times, and since the city's establishment in the 14th century has been ruled by various dynasties including the Mughals, the British, and the Nawabs of Bengal. The city is also home to several important landmarks, such as one of the Islamic sites in Bangladesh, the Shah Jalal Dargah, which attracts thousands of pilgrims annually.

Sylhet is one of the most economically important cities in Bangladesh after Dhaka and Chittagong. A major commercial and financial centre, Sylhet is home to several multinational companies and industries, including the tea industry, which generates a significant amount of revenue for the city. Sylhet has diverse transport infrastructure, with a modern airport, railway station, and bus terminals that connect it to other parts of the country. The city also has several educational institutions, including Sylhet Agricultural University, Shahjalal University of Science and Technology, MAG Osmani Medical College and Sylhet Cadet College.

== Etymology and names ==
Sylhet is the anglicisation of শিলহট (Śilhôṭ), one of the archaic native names for the city. The local name is generally thought to be directly derived from শ্রীহট্ট (Śrīhaṭṭa), the Sanskrit name of the city. The city of Śrīhaṭṭa takes its name from Śrīhaṭṭanātha, the tutelary deity of the Nātha dynasty who promoted the early settlement of Nāthas in the Surma and Barak valleys between the twelfth and thirteenth centuries, founding the Śrīhaṭṭa janapada and establishing Śrīhaṭṭanātha idols across the region. The later Hindu monarchs of Sylhet, such as Gour Govinda, continued to pay tribute to the deity as Hāṭkeśvara or Haṭṭanātha as evident from the Devipurana and copper-plate inscriptions.

== History ==
In 1303, the Sultan of Lakhnauti Shamsuddin Firoz Shah conquered Sylhet by defeating Gour Govinda. Sylhet became a part of the Bengal Sultanate. In the 16th century, Sylhet was controlled by the Baro-Bhuiyan zamindars such as Sardars of Pathan Confederacy. Later it became a sarkar (district) of the Mughal Empire. Sylhet emerged after 1612 as the Mughals' most significant imperial outpost in Bengal east of Dhaka, and its importance remained as such throughout the seventeenth century. British rule began in the 18th century under the administration of the East India Company. Sylhet became a key source of lascars in the British Empire due in part to its ancient seafaring tradition. The Sylhet municipal board was established in 1867. Originally part of the Bengal Presidency and later Eastern Bengal and Assam, the town became part of Colonial Assam in 1874. A devastating earthquake demolished almost the entire town on 12 June 1897 following which a modern and European model new town was built on the wreckage. From the beginning of the 20th century, the importance of Sylhet increased with the establishment of the tea industry.

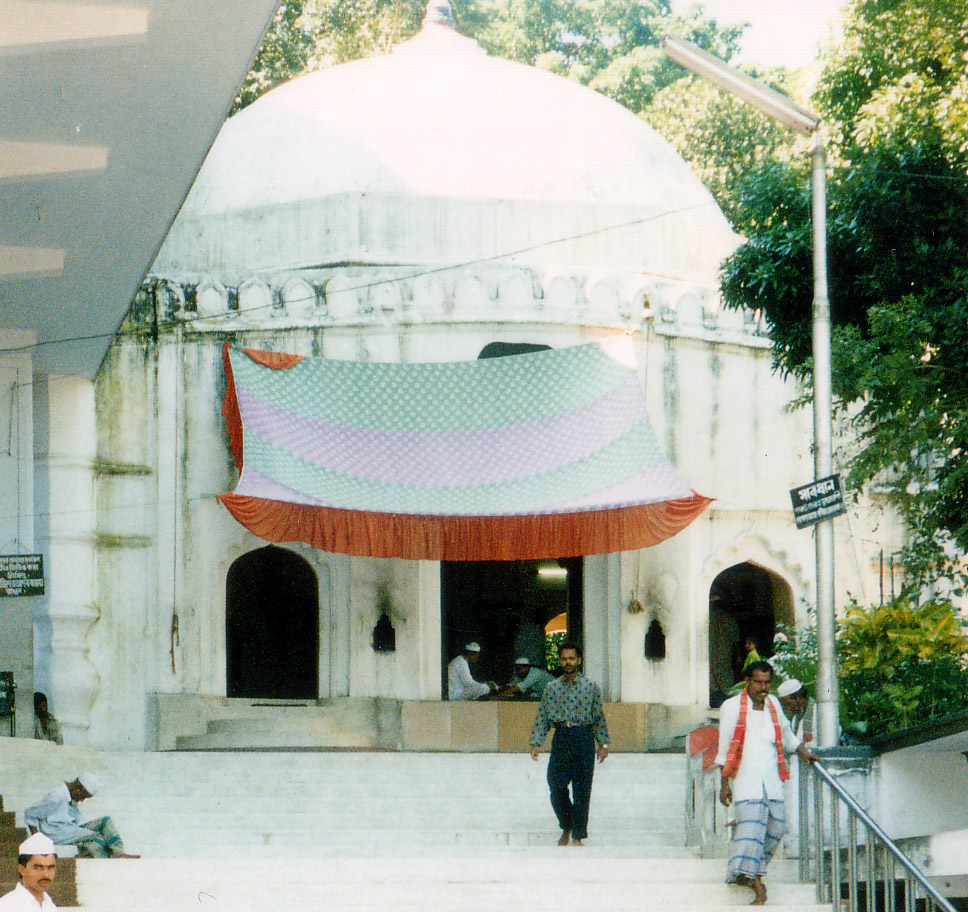
Tomb of Hazrat Shah Jalal.

In 1947, following a referendum and the partition of British India, Sylhet became part of East Pakistan. In 1995, the Government of Bangladesh declared Sylhet as the sixth divisional headquarters of the country.

In 2001, the municipality was upgraded to the Sylhet City Corporation. It was made a metropolitan city in 2009.

== Geography and climate ==
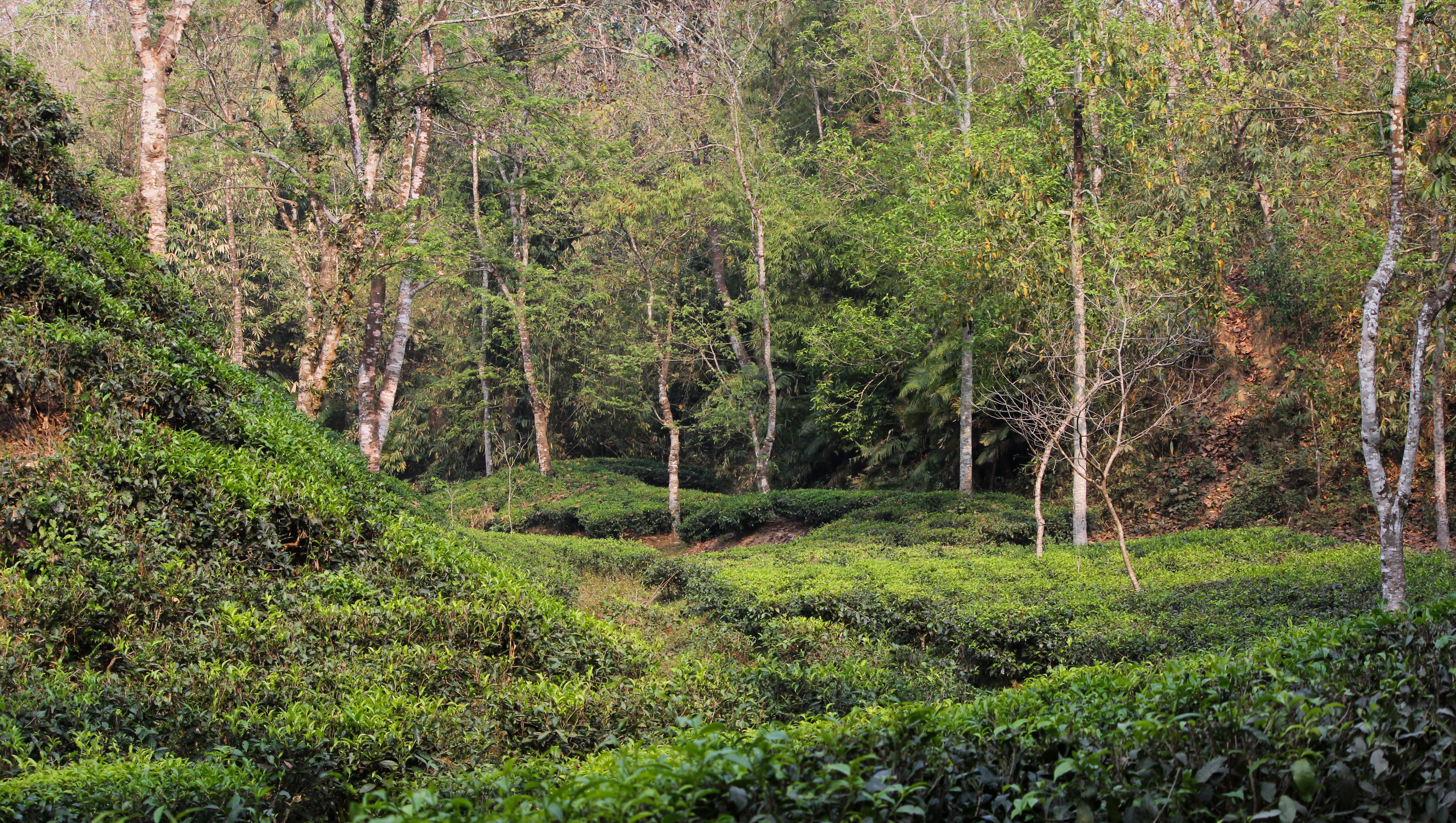
Khadimnagar National Park Tea Garden

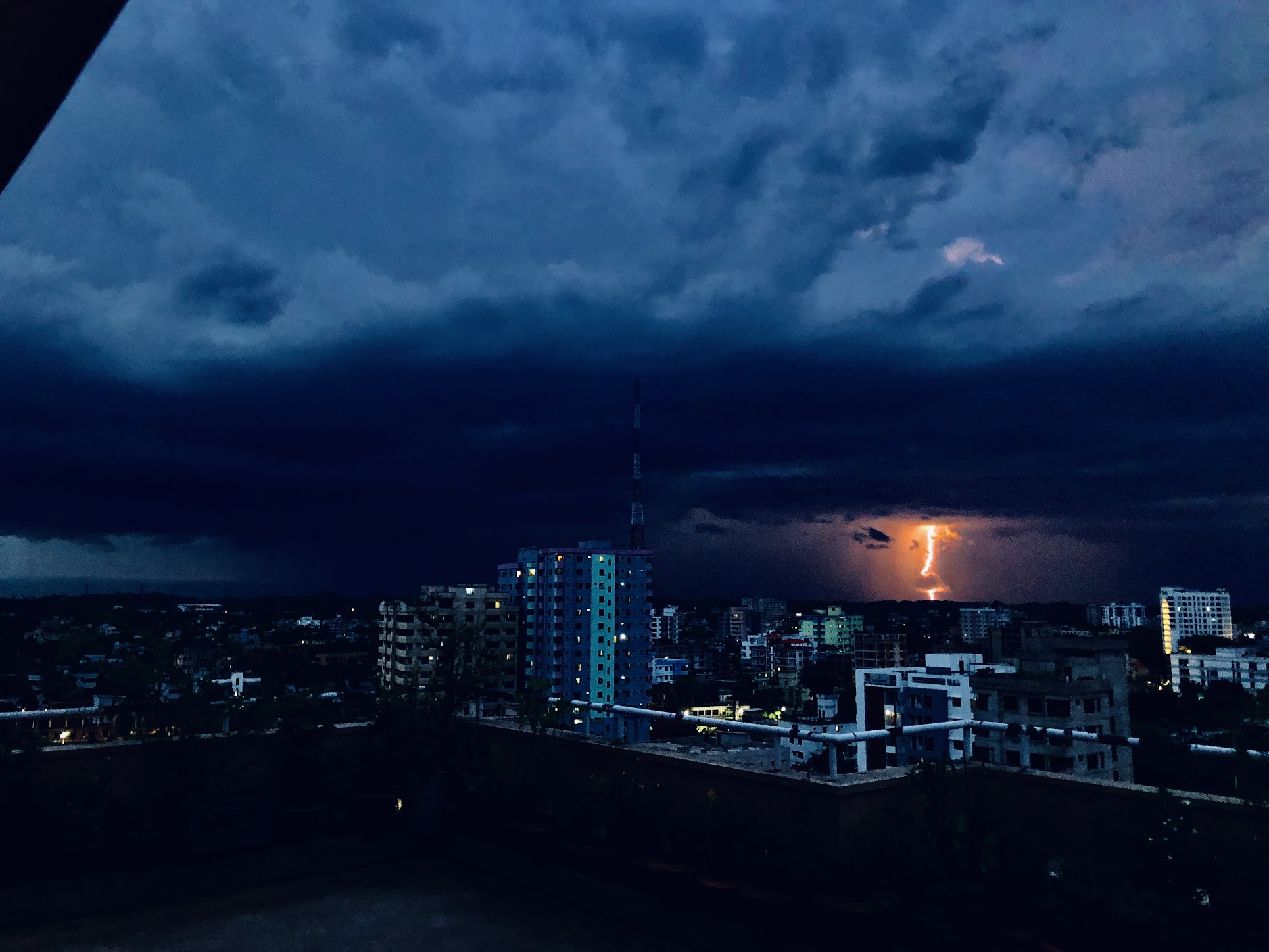
Sylhet city during a thunderstorm

Sylhet is located in the northeastern region of Bangladesh within the Sylhet Division, the Sylhet District, and Sylhet Sadar Upazila. Sylhet has a typical Bangladeshi tropical monsoon climate (Köppen Am) bordering on a humid subtropical climate (Cwa) at higher elevations. The rainy season runs from April to October, and is generally hot and humid with heavy showers and thunderstorms almost every day. The shorter dry season runs from November to February, with very warm and fairly clear weather. Nearly 80% of the annual average rainfall of 4,200 millimetres (170 in) occurs between May and September.

Geologically, the region is complex and diverse; higher-elevation regions date partly to the Plio-Miocene age. Available limestone deposits in different parts of the region suggest that the whole area was under the ocean in the Oligo-Miocene. In the last 150 years, three major earthquakes have hit the city with magnitude of at least 7.5 on the Richter Scale, most recently in 1918.

Climate data for Sylhet (1991–2020 normals, extremes 1952–present)
Month	Jan	Feb	Mar	Apr	May	Jun	Jul	Aug	Sep	Oct	Nov	Dec	Year
Record high °C (°F)	34.5 (94.1)	35.0 (95.0)	38.8 (101.8)	40.5 (104.9)	38.2 (100.8)	39.6 (103.3)	38.4 (101.1)	37.9 (100.2)	38.3 (100.9)	37.2 (99.0)	35.3 (95.5)	31.3 (88.3)	40.5 (104.9)
Mean daily maximum °C (°F)	25.6 (78.1)	28.2 (82.8)	31.2 (88.2)	31.5 (88.7)	31.4 (88.5)	31.6 (88.9)	32.2 (90.0)	32.5 (90.5)	32.3 (90.1)	31.8 (89.2)	29.7 (85.5)	26.8 (80.2)	30.4 (86.7)
Daily mean °C (°F)	18.4 (65.1)	20.8 (69.4)	24.3 (75.7)	26.0 (78.8)	26.8 (80.2)	27.6 (81.7)	28.0 (82.4)	28.2 (82.8)	27.9 (82.2)	26.7 (80.1)	23.3 (73.9)	19.7 (67.5)	24.8 (76.6)
Mean daily minimum °C (°F)	9.8 (49.6)	12.4 (54.3)	17.4 (63.3)	21.2 (70.2)	23.0 (73.4)	24.8 (76.6)	25.3 (77.5)	25.3 (77.5)	24.8 (76.6)	22.3 (72.1)	16.6 (61.9)	11.8 (53.2)	19.6 (67.3)
Record low °C (°F)	3.4 (38.1)	8.8 (47.8)	11.5 (52.7)	14.0 (57.2)	18.0 (64.4)	18.0 (64.4)	19.3 (66.7)	22.3 (72.1)	20.5 (68.9)	16.5 (61.7)	13.4 (56.1)	8.0 (46.4)	3.4 (38.1)
Average precipitation mm (inches)	7 (0.3)	38 (1.5)	127 (5.0)	382 (15.0)	590 (23.2)	795 (31.3)	723 (28.5)	609 (24.0)	496 (19.5)	201 (7.9)	25 (1.0)	10 (0.4)	4,003 (157.6)
Average precipitation days (≥ 1 mm)	1	3	7	15	22	26	28	26	20	10	2	1	161
Average relative humidity (%)	75	68	68	76	81	87	87	86	86	83	77	75	79
Mean monthly sunshine hours	212.2	210.6	223.2	196.1	178.6	121.9	132.8	145.1	148.7	218.9	242.9	238.0	2,269
Source 1: NOAA
Source 2: Bangladesh Meteorological Department (humidity 1981-2010)

== Administration ==
The Sylhet City Corporation (SCC) administers the metropolitan area of Sylhet. The city is governed through 6 metropolitan thanas: Kotwali Model Thana, South Surma Thana, Moglabazar Thana, Jalalabad Thana, Bimanbandar Thana, Shah Poran Thana. These thanas are further subdivided into 42 wards and numerous mahallas. The SCC is responsible for municipal governance and civic services, including water supply, sanitation, waste management, road maintenance, street lighting, public health, and urban development within its jurisdiction.

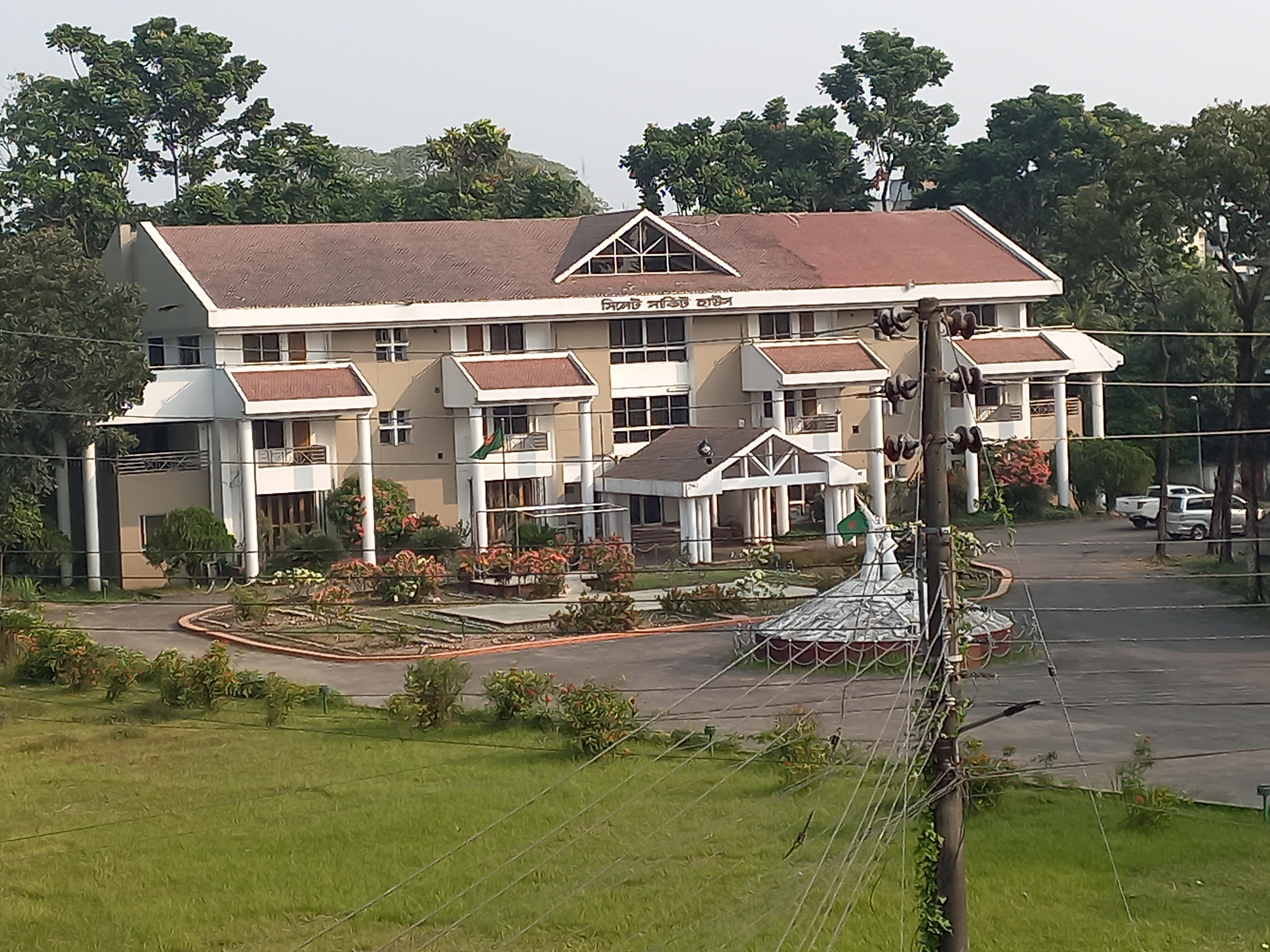
Sylhet Circuit House

Robert Lindsay, who served as the District Collector of Sylhet from 1778 to 1790, mentioned Sylhet in his autobiography, Oriental Miscellanies: Anecdotes of Indian Life, as 'a small bazaar (market)'. He wrote, "The town was then merely a small market. The inhabitants’ houses were situated on the hills and hidden behind forests and jungles." Exactly 100 years after his tenure, in 1878, Sylhet was upgraded into a municipality with an approximate area of about 1.75 square kilometres. The civic body of Sylhet was formed according to the Sylhet City Corporation Act, 2001, which came into effect on April 10, 2001. On July 28, 2002, Sylhet Municipality board was upgraded to a City Corporation, which covered an area of 26.50 square kilometres and was divided into 27 wards. Currently, the city is administered by the Sylhet City Corporation. On August 31, 2021, a gazette notification was issued to expand the area of Sylhet City Corporation. According to the gazette, several mouzas from four unions of Sylhet Sadar Upazila and three unions of Dakshin Surma Upazila were included in the City Corporation. Subsequently, the expanded areas were reorganized and boundaries were defined on a ward basis under Sections 29 and 30 of the Local Government (City Corporation) Act, 2009. Currently, the City Corporation consists of 42 wards and covers an area of 79.5 square kilometres. At present, Sylhet is the district-headquarters as well as the divisional headquarters of the districts of Sunamganj, Habiganj, Moulvibazar and Sylhet District. The Sylhet City Corporation is responsible for the services that are provided within the city which includes traffic, roads, garbage collection, water supply, registrations and many others. The corporation consists of the Mayor and 22 other commissioners, and focuses on the development of the city.

=== Military ===
The Bangladesh Army's 17th Infantry Division is based at Jalalabad Cantonment in Sylhet.

=== Healthcare ===
In 2018, Sylhet Medical University was established in the city, following the Prime Minister Sheikh Hasina's order to found a medical university in each division with the goal of maintaining medical standards in colleges. According to the order, Chittagong and Rajshahi Medical University have already been established, and Sylhet Medical University is the fourth Medical University of the directive.

== Demographics ==
Population

Historical population

Year	Pop.	±% p.a.
1991	217,412	—
2001	263,197	+1.93%

Year	Pop.	±% p.a.
2011	479,837	+6.19%
2022	532,839	+0.96%

At the time of the 2022 census, Sylhet had a population of 116,402 households and a population of 532,839. 7.75% of the population was under 5 years of age. Sylhet had a sex ratio of 107.51 females per 100 males and a literacy rate of 84.57%: 86.68% for males and 82.29% for females.

As of the 2011 Bangladesh census, Sylhet has a population of 485,138. The population growth rate of the city is 1.73%, a decrease from 1.93% in 1991. Sylhet has a sex ratio of 861 females to 1000 males and a literacy rate of 67.8%.

Religions

Religions in Sylhet City Corp. (2022)
Religion	Percent
Islam	86.52%
Hinduism	13.30%
Other or not stated	0.18%

The majority of people in Sylhet are Muslims (90.52%), while other religious groups include Hindus (9.30%) and less than 0.18% of other religions, mainly Buddhists and Christians. The majority of Muslims in Sylhet are Sunnis who follow the Hanafi school of jurisprudence. Significant numbers of people also follow Sufi ideals, particularly the teachings of Sufi Shaykh Abdul Latif Fultali.

Languages

The majority of the population are Bengali Muslims, while significant minority population groups include the Bengali Hindus, Bishnupriya Manipuri and others. Sylheti is spoken by the vast majority of the people, while Standard Bengali is the official language used by the state government and officials. 2,424 (0.45%) of the population are of an ethnic minority, of which 2,040 are Manipuri.

== Economy ==
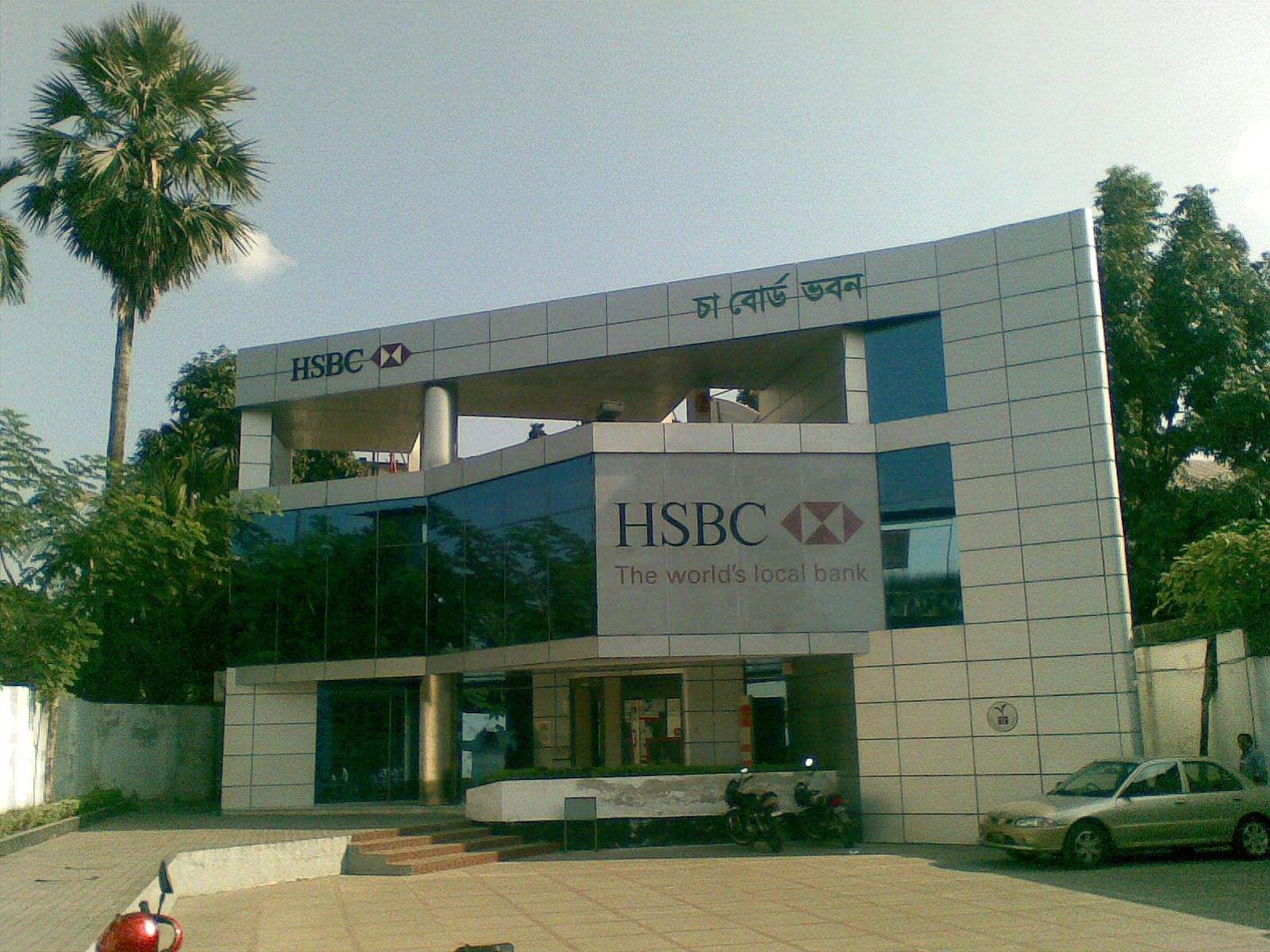
Tea Board building, Sylhet

Sylhet's economy is closely linked with the Bangladeshi diaspora, especially the British Bangladeshi community. The city receives a significant portion of the country's annual remittances, which have driven growth in real estate and construction.

Sylhet's hinterland is home to the country's largest natural gas fields, sole crude oil field, largest tea plantations and agarwood. Most of the tea production in Bangladesh is based around Sylhet, much of which is eventually exported internationally.

=== Utilities ===
Sylhet has high rates of electricity shortages and water shortages. According to the Power Development Board, as of 2009, Sylhet was only receiving 50 MW, half of the required demand of 100 MW. The city corporation was also supplying only 22,500 gallons of water, far less than the demand of about 65,000. Tests of tube wells in Sylhet District by the Bangladesh University of Engineering and Technology in 1997 found that about 27.6% contained more arsenic than the acceptable limit set by Bangladesh of 50 micrograms per litre, and 49.2% contained more arsenic than the World Health Organization standard of 10 micrograms per litre. There are about 331 registered restaurants in the city, but only 15% maintain sanitary facilities and 85% have unhygienic conditions that are unsafe for the public.

== Media and communications ==
Sylhet is a center for the newspaper, magazine and book publishers. Some locally published newspapers are:

- Sylheter Dak
- Daily Jalalabad

State-owned Bangladesh Television operates a relay station headquartered in the Kazitula neighbourhood. From 2000 to 2002, privately owned Ekushey Television broadcast terrestrially on VHF channel 11 in Sylhet.

== Sports ==
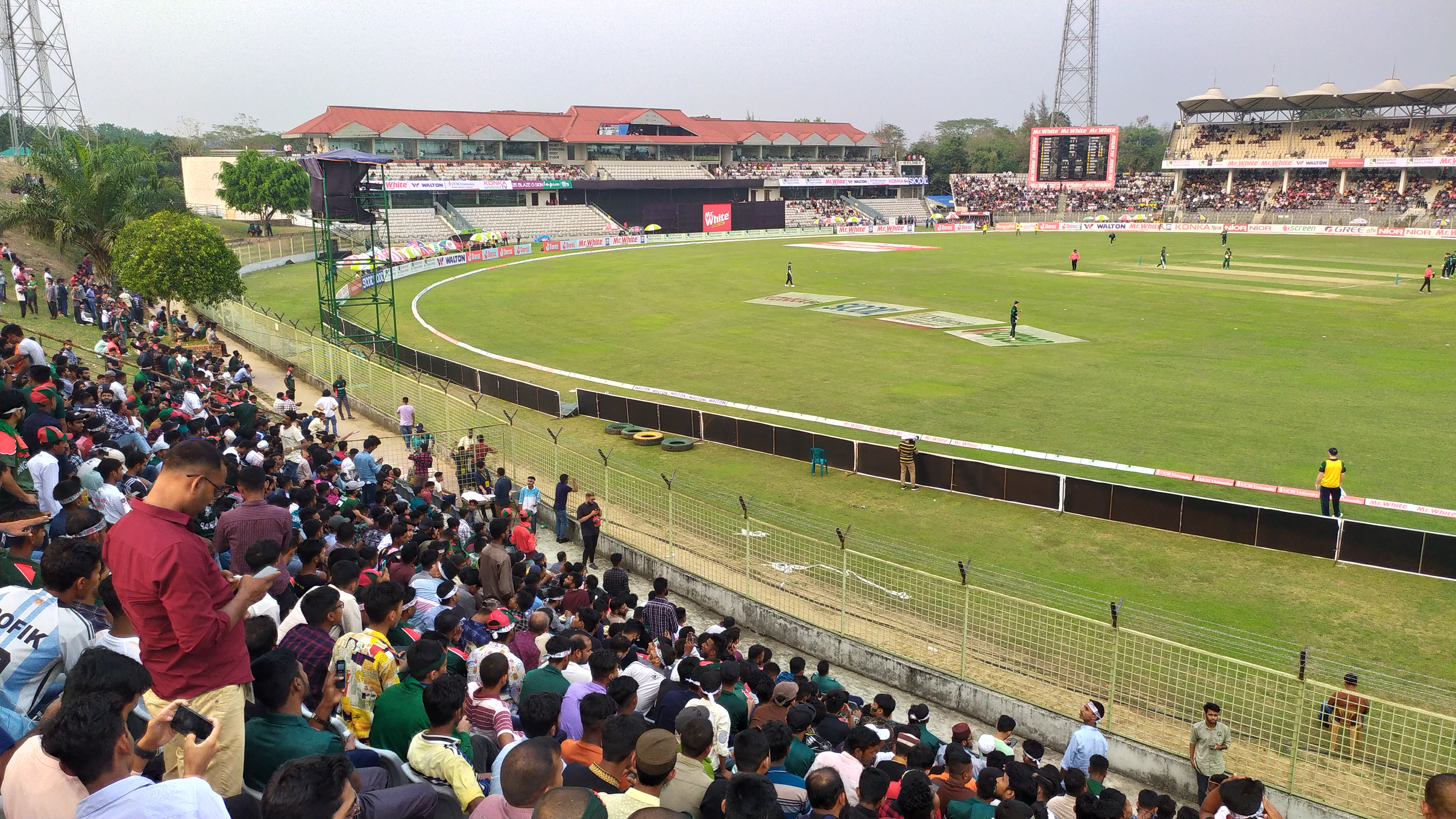
One Day International match in the Sylhet International Cricket Stadium

The Bangladesh Premier League franchise Sylhet Titans are based in Sylhet International Cricket Stadium (M.A.G. Osmani Stadium), which was built in 2007 and has a capacity of 18,500 spectators. The Sylhet International Cricket Stadium was renovated in 2013 specifically to host matches for the 2014 ICC World Twenty20. It is situated near lush green tea gardens on the city fringe. In the National Cricket League, Sylhet Division has not won any titles but did win in the One-Day Cricket League during the 2001–02 season. Notable players from Sylhet who have played for the Bangladesh national cricket team include Rajin Saleh, Enamul Haque Jr, Tapash Baisya, and Alok Kapali. Chess player Rani Hamid was awarded the FIDE Women's International Master (WIM) title in 1985, while her son Kaiser Hamid was the captain of the Bangladesh national football team in the early 90s.

== Transport ==
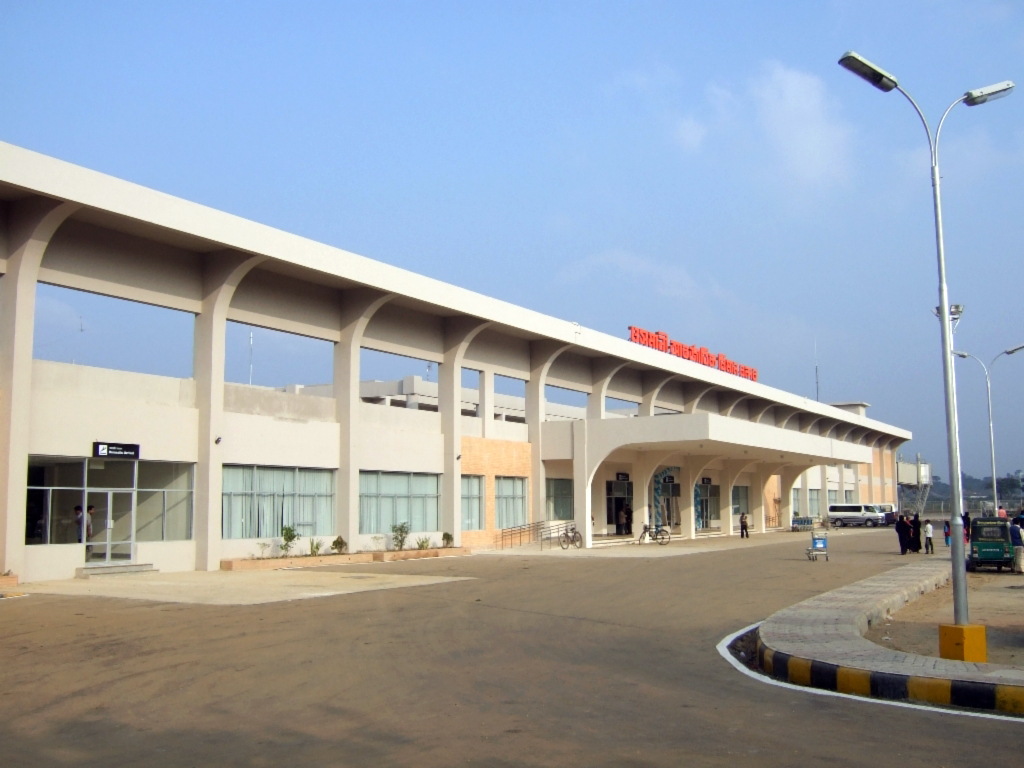
Sylhet MAG Osmani International Airport

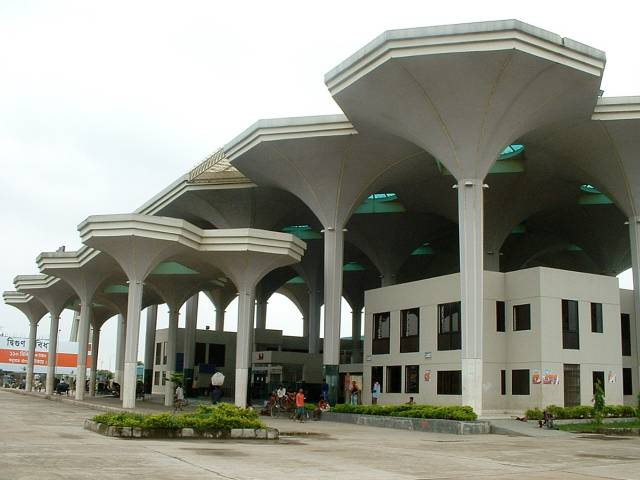
Sylhet railway station

=== Road ===
The main transport systems used in Sylhet are cycle rickshaws, auto rickshaws (mainly known as baby-taxis or CNGs), buses, mini-buses and cars. About 80,000 rickshaws run each day within the city. Bus service prices have increased up to 30% higher, and as of 2008 prices range from Tk 4 to 15.95.

The N2 connects the city with Bangladesh's capital and largest city, Dhaka, as well as with many other parts of the country. The N2 highway is also part of the Asian Highway Network's two longest routes, AH1 and AH2.

=== Air ===
Sylhet is served by Osmani International Airport, located at the north of the city. It is Bangladesh's third busiest airport, and it became an international airport due to demand driven by expatriate Bangladeshis and their families living in the United Kingdom and the United States. The most prevalent airlines at the airport are Biman Bangladesh Airlines, US-Bangla Airlines and Novoair.

Osmani International Airport received its first international arrival on 3 November 2002, with a Biman plane arriving from Kuwait via Abu Dhabi en route to Dhaka. Sylhet's first direct international flight arrived on 15 March 2017 when a Flydubai direct flight from Dubai landed at the airport. Work began in 2006 to upgrade the airport to international standards, including a new terminal building, a jetway, a taxiway, and expansion of the runway to accommodate wide-bodied aircraft. In May 2007, Biman announced direct Hajj flights originating from the airport later that year. As of 2020, Biman Bangladesh operates direct flights to London from Sylhet. All Bangladeshi airlines operate regular domestic flights to Dhaka and Biman operates regular domestic flights to Cox's Bazar.

In response to the increase in passenger and cargo demand at the airport, work began in 2020 on a new 34,919 square metres (375,860 sq ft) international passenger terminal building, as well as a cargo building, a control tower, parking areas, and a taxiway.

=== Rail ===
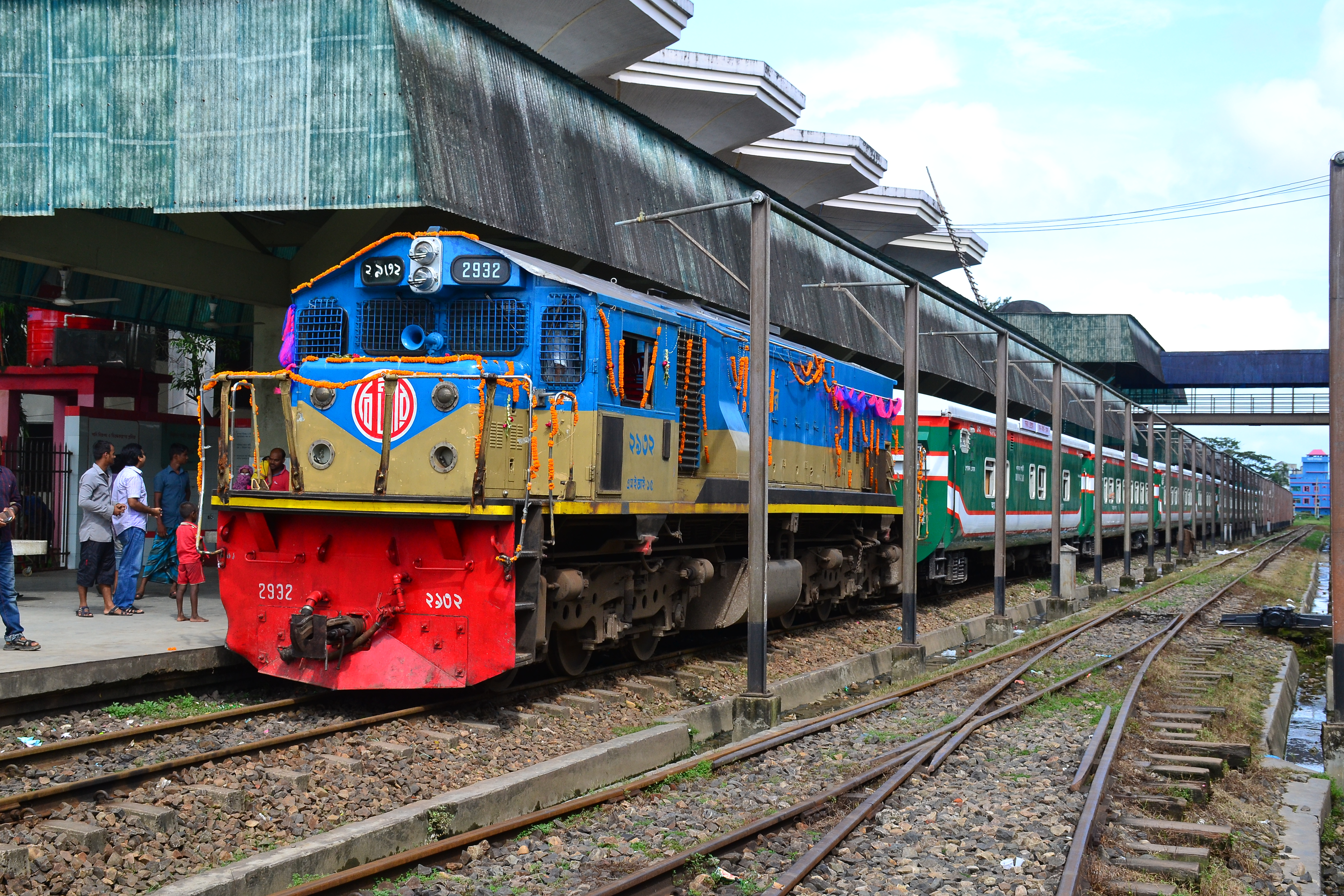
Parabat Express train in Sylhet Railway Station

The Sylhet railway station is the main railway station providing trains on national routes operated by the state-run Bangladesh Railway.

== Education ==
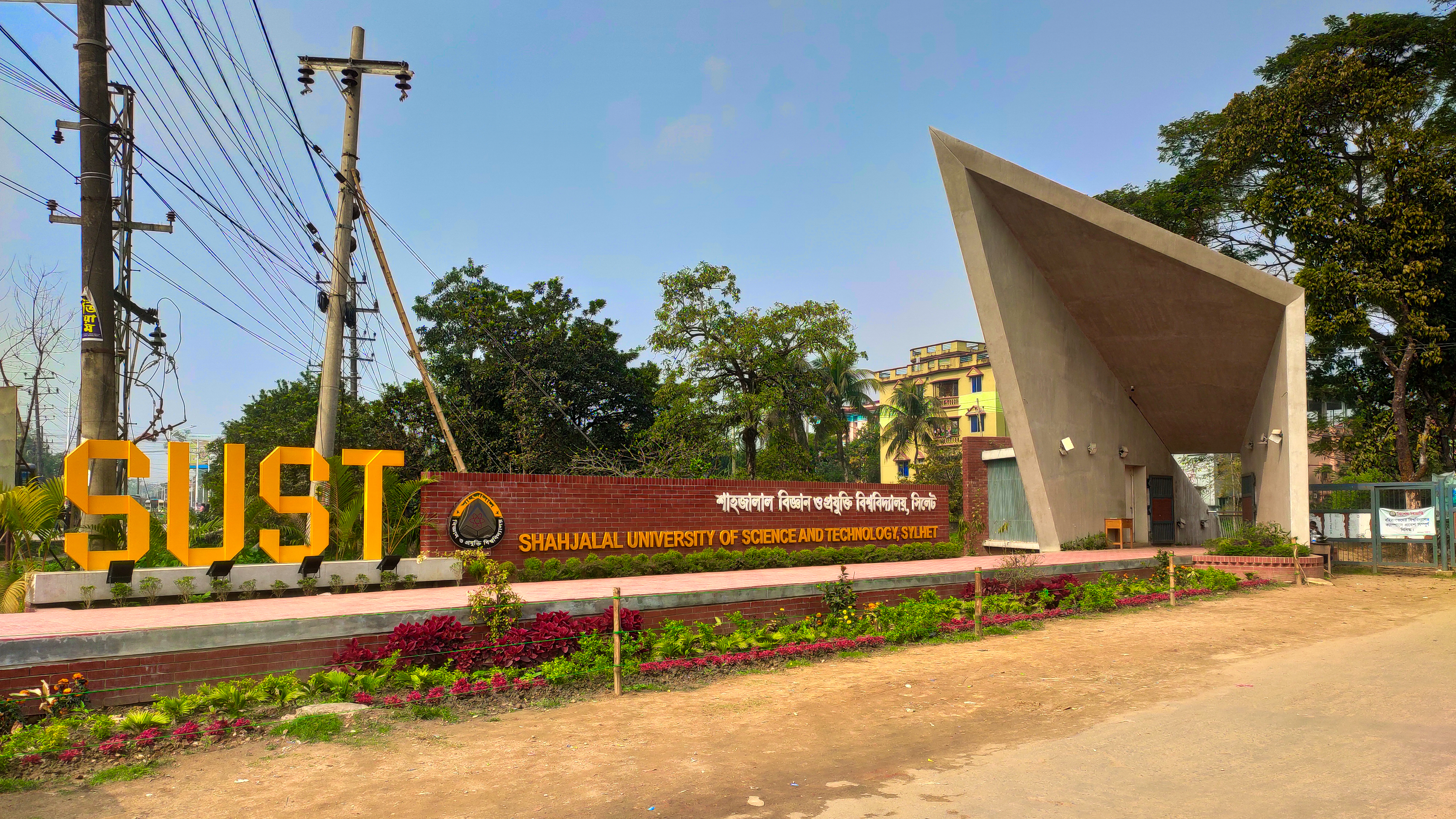
Main entrance of the Shahjalal University of Science and Technology (SUST)

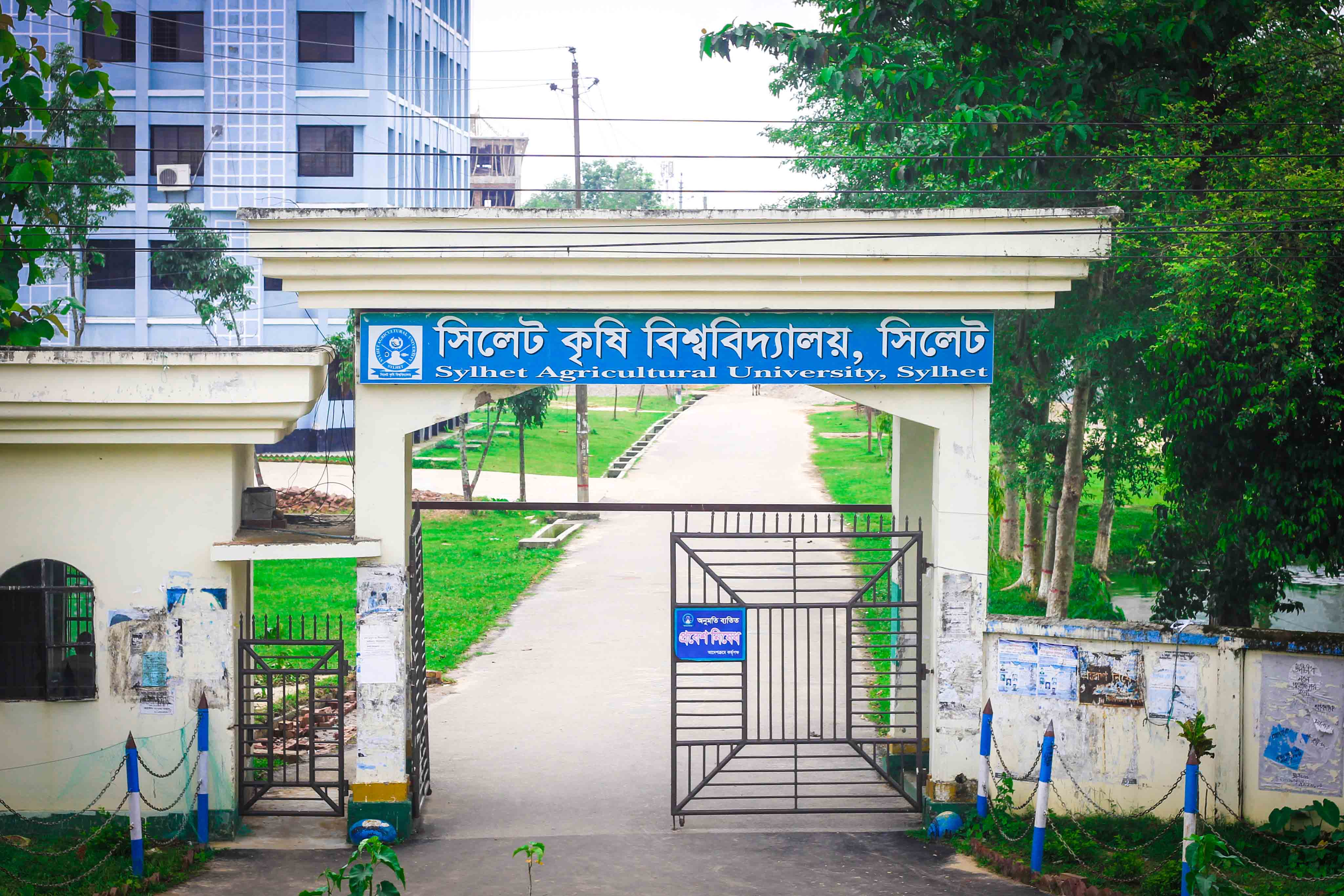
The main gate of Sylhet Agricultural University.

There are two public universities in Sylhet: Shahjalal University of Science and Technology and Sylhet Agricultural University. There are also private universities such as Leading University and Metropolitan University. Other prominent colleges and schools in Sylhet include Jalalabad Cantonment Public School and College, Jalalabad Ragib-Rabeya Medical College, MAG Osmani Medical College, Sylhet Women's Medical College, North East Medical College, Parkview Medical College, Sylhet Engineering College, Sylhet Cadet College, Murari Chand College, Institute of Health Technology, Sylhet, Sylhet Science And Technology College, Sylhet Polytechnic Institute, and Sylhet Government Women's College.

== Twin towns – sister cities ==
As of 2009, Sylhet has friendly relations with:

- St Albans, United Kingdom
- Rochdale, United Kingdom

The friendship link with St Albans was established in 1988, when the St Albans' district council supported a housing project in Sylhet as part of the International Year of Shelter for the Homeless. Sylhet was chosen because it is the home region for a large ethnic minority population in St Albans.

== See also ==
- Shah Jalal
- Greater Sylhet
- Sylheti language
