= Habiganj Medical College =

College in Bangladesh

Habiganj Medical College, Habiganj
- হবিগঞ্জ মেডিকেল কলেজ, হবিগঞ্জ
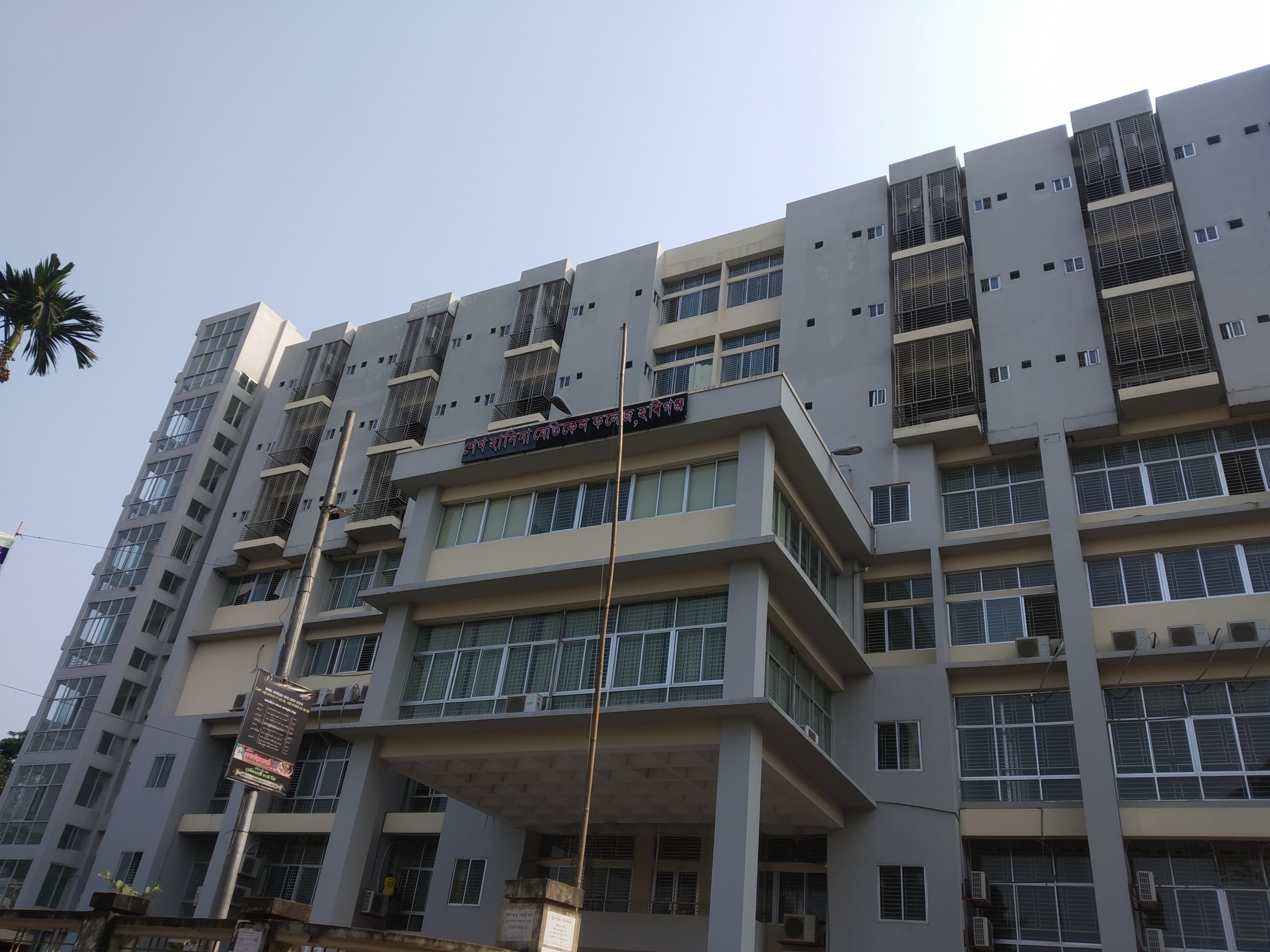
- Former names: Sheikh Hasina Medical College Habiganj (2017-2024)
- Type: Public Medical College
- Established: 2017
- Academic affiliations: Shahjalal University of Science and Technology; Sylhet Medical University (from 2020-21)
- Principal: Sunirmal Roy
- Students: About 306
- Location: Habiganj, Bangladesh; 24.3736°N 91.4171°E
- Campus: Urban
- Language: English
- Website: shmc.college.gov.bd

Habiganj Medical College, formerly known as Sheikh Hasina Medical College, Habiganj, is a public medical college in Habiganj, Bangladesh founded in 2017. It was affiliated with the Shahjalal University of Science and Technology until 2019-20. Currently it is affiliated with Sylhet Medical University. The college's first batch of students began their first term on 10 January 2018, on its temporary campus of Habiganj Sadar Hospital, with 250 beds. On 10 January 2018, the medical college started its educational activities with 51 students.

== History ==
Prime Minister Sheikh Hasina announced the establishment of a public medical college in Habiganj on 29 November 2014, at a public meeting at Habiganj New Ground. Administrative approval was given for the admission of 50 students on 1 January 2015. In September 2016, Md. Abu Sufyan was appointed as principal of the college. But no student was approved for admission as there was no place to take classes. The educational activities of the college started with 18 male and 33 female (total 51) students in 2016–17 academic year. The university saw the largest cut of 50 seats during the 2023–24 admission session.

== Location ==
The college is located in the heart of Habiganj district town, Sunamganj and Sylhet in the north, Moulvibazar in the east, Kishoreganj and Brahmanbaria districts in the west.

== Administration ==
=== General ===
The College is administered by the Ministry of Health and Family Welfare. Principal is the Executive head of the college. He communicates and implements all the regulations of the administrative authorities.

=== Academic Council ===
Academic Council is the highest body of the college. Principal, Habigabj Medical College is the chairman. The Head of Departments of Anatomy, Physiology, Biochemistry, Pathology, Microbiology, Pharmacology, Community Medicine, Forensic Medicine, Medicine, Surgery, Gynecology & Obstetrics and all other full professors are the members of the council.

This body monitors and maintains control of the campus in order to ensure a smooth progress of the academic activities. It also refers the disciplinary matters to the Disciplinary Committee to take actions against those who violate any rule or regulation of the college.

== Academics ==
The college offers a five-year course of study, leading to a Bachelor of Medicine, Bachelor of Surgery (MBBS) degree from Sylhet Medical University. After passing the final professional examination, there is a compulsory one-year internship. The internship is a prerequisite for obtaining registration from the BMDC to practice medicine.

Admission for Bangladeshis to the MBBS programme at all medical colleges in Bangladesh (public and private) is conducted centrally by the Directorate General of Health Services (DGHS). It administers a written multiple choice question examination of 100 marks simultaneously throughout the country. Candidates are admitted based primarily on their score on this test, although grades at Secondary School Certificate (SSC) and Higher Secondary School Certificate (HSC) level also play a part. The college is allowed to admit 51 students annually.

== Departments ==
Phase 1: Basic Science

- Anatomy
- Biochemistry
- Physiology

Phase 2 & 3: Para-clinical

- Community Medicine
- Forensic Medicine
- Pharmacology
- Pathology
- Microbiology

Phase 4: Clinical

- Medicine
- General Surgery
- Cardiology
- Pediatrics and Neonatology
- Otorhinolaryngology (Ear, Nose & Throat)
- Anesthesiology
- Ophthalmology
- Obstetrics & Gynecology
- Radiology
- Orthopedics
- Nephrology
- Psychiatry

== Voluntary organizations ==
- Sandhani
- Medicine Club

== See also ==
- List of medical colleges in Bangladesh
