= North East Medical College =

Private medical school in Sylhet, Bangladesh

- নর্থ ইষ্ট মেডিকেল কলেজ
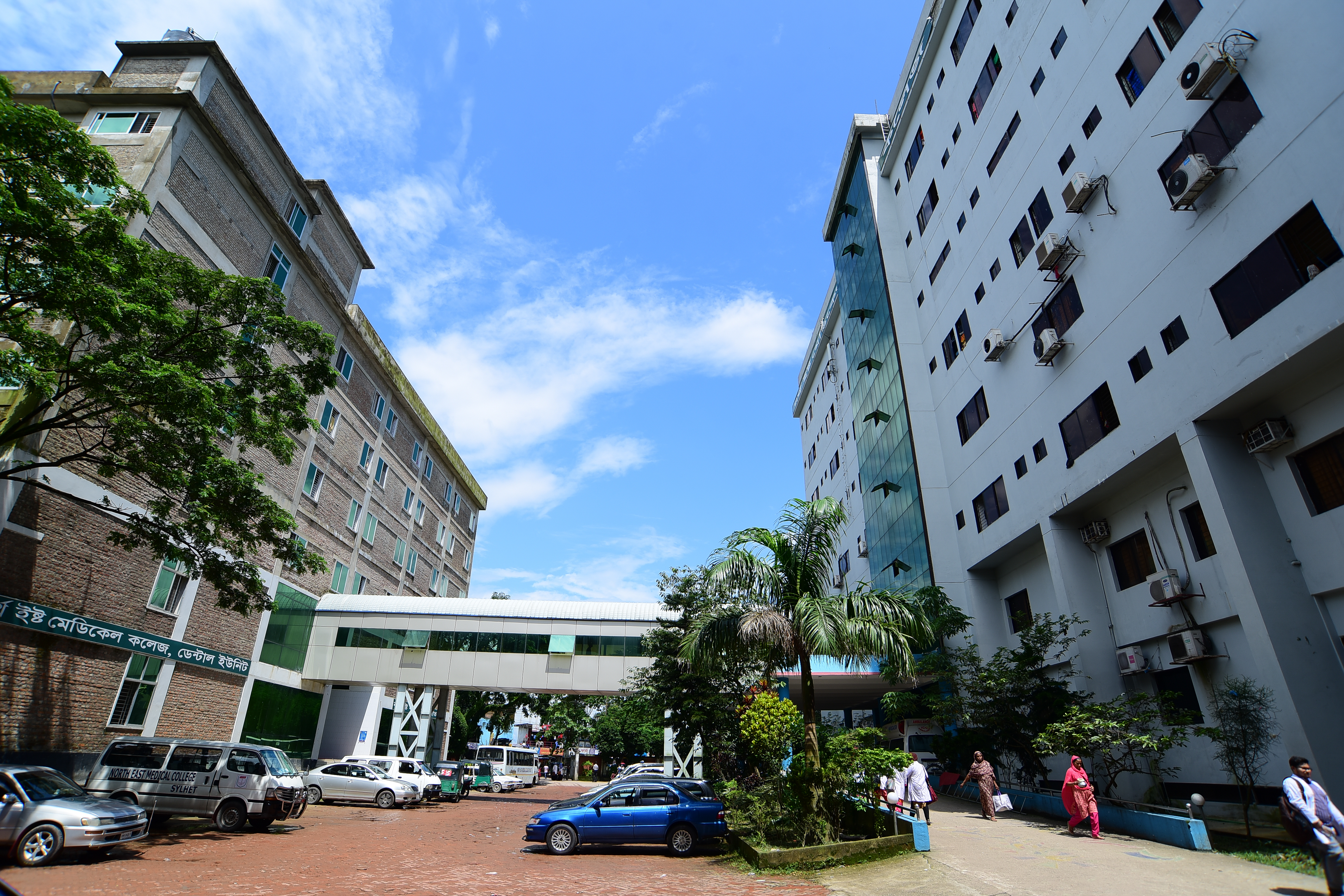
- Type: Private medical school
- Established: 1998
- Academic affiliations: Sylhet Medical University
- Principal: Shahriar Hussain Chowdhury
- Students: 637+
- Location: Sylhet, South Surma, Bangladesh; 24.865°N 91.857°E
- Campus: Urban
- Language: English

North East Medical College (NEMC) (Bengali: নর্থ ইষ্ট মেডিকেল কলেজ) is a private medical school in Bangladesh, established in 1998. It is located in South Surma Upazila, Sylhet. It is affiliated to Sylhet Medical University.

It offers a five-year course of study leading to a Bachelor of Medicine, Bachelor of Surgery (MBBS) degree. A one-year internship after graduation is compulsory for all graduates. The degree is recognized by the Bangladesh Medical and Dental Council.

== Campus ==
The college is located in Dakshin Surma Upazila, Sylhet, 300 metres (980 ft) south of the Dhaka–Sylhet Highway. The main buildings on campus are an academic building and North East Medical College Hospital, the college's 800-bed teaching hospital.

North East Nursing College shares the campus. It offers a three-year Diploma in Nursing Science and Midwifery, a four-year Basic Bachelor of Science in Nursing, a two-year Post-basic BSc in Nursing.

== History ==
North East Medical College was founded in 1998 by Northeast Medical Private Limited.

Shortly after its foundation, the Northeast Medical Private Limited acquired six acres of land in South Surma region of Sylhet. Here, in 1999 they built the medical college campus and in 2002 an 800 bed multi-specialty hospital.

After that this institute grown exponentially with development of several institute in and around the campus. Most notable of them would be the North East Cancer Hospital, North East Nursing College and North East Medical College Dental Unit.

== Organization and administration ==
The college is affiliated with Shahjalal University of Science and Technology (SUST) under the School of Medical Sciences and Bangamata Sheikh Fazilatunnesa Mujib Medical University, Sylhet. The chairman of the governing body is Mohammed Afzal Miah, and the principal is Shahriar Hussain Chowdhury.

== Academics ==
The college offers a five-year course of study, approved by the Bangladesh Medical and Dental Council (BMDC), leading to a Bachelor of Medicine Bachelor of Surgery (MBBS) degree from SUST. After passing the final professional examination, there is a compulsory one-year internship. The internship is a prerequisite for obtaining registration from the BMDC to practice medicine. The academic calendar runs from July to June each year.

Admission for Bangladeshis to the MBBS programme at all medical colleges in Bangladesh (government and private) is conducted centrally by the Directorate General of Health Services (DGHS). It administers a written multiple-choice question exam simultaneously throughout the country. Candidates are admitted based primarily on their score on this test, although grades at Secondary School Certificate (SSC) and Higher Secondary School Certificate (HSC) level also play a part. Admission for foreign students is based on their SSC and HSC grades. As of July 2014, the college is allowed to admit 125 students annually.

Since 2004, the college also offers postgraduate training recognized by the Bangladesh College of Physicians and Surgeons (BCPS).

== Recognition and accreditation ==
- European Medical Association (EMA), UK
- General Medical Council (GMC), UK
- International Accreditation Organization (IAO)
- Foundation for Advancement of International Medical Education and Research (FAIMER)
- World Directory of Medical Schools under World Health Organization (WHO)
- World Federation for Medical Education (WFME)
- Bangladesh Medical and Dental Council (BMDC)
- Bangladesh Medical Education Accreditation Council (BMEAC)

== COVID-19 response ==
North East Medical College and Hospital became the first medical college hospital in greater Sylhet to open a fully dedicated COVID-19 unit with ICU support.

== See also ==
- List of medical colleges in Bangladesh
