= Sunamganj Medical College =

Government medical college in Sunamganj, Bangladesh

- Former name: Bangabandhu Medical College
- Type: Public Medical College
- Established: 2021
- Academic affiliations: Sylhet Medical University
- Principal: Dr. Mostaque Ahmed Bhuiyan
- Students: 50
- Location: Madanpur, Sunamganj-3000, Bangladesh; 24.9401°N 91.4051°E
- Campus: Urban
- Language: English
- Website: bbmcs.edu.bd

Sunamganj Medical College is a Government medical college in Bangladesh. It is located in the Sunamganj District of Sylhet Division, by the side of the Sunamganj – Sylhet highway and on the East side of river Surma.

It offers a five-year medical education course leading to an MBBS degree. Bangabandhu Medical College, Sunamganj affiliated under Sylhet Medical University for 2020-2021, 2021-2022,2022-2023 session MBBS course.

== Location ==
Sunamganj Medical College and Hospital are being constructed in the Madanpur area on the west side of Sunamganj-Sylhet road and on the east bank of Surma river (between the road and river).

== History ==
The Government of Bangladesh built this medical college hospital to ensure the health care of the people of Haor area. Prime Minister Sheikh Hasina approved the project worth Tk 1,107.89 crore at the ECNEC meeting titled 'Bangabandhu Sunamganj Medical College and Hospital'. Fifty students who have passed the MBBS admission test in 2020-21 are getting admission in this medical college.

The newly constructed Dakshin Sunamganj Upazila Health Complex will conduct lessons for the students of Primary Medical College.

== Campus ==
On a temporary basis, the newly constructed South Sunamganj Upazila Health Complex will conduct lessons for the students of the Primary Medical College. Education activities will continue in the permanent campus under construction in Madanpur area of Sadar Upazila.

A total of 29 modern buildings of Sunamganj Medical College and Hospital are being constructed. Among the buildings, a 6-storey hospital building with basement, a nine story academic building and a six storey hotel building will be constructed. In addition, a six storey intern doctors building will be constructed. One ten storey single doctors accommodation building with a ten storey foundation will be constructed. A six storey staff nurse dormitory building with six storey foundation will be constructed. A three storey laundry building with three storey foundation will be constructed. A four storey mosque building with a four storey foundation will be constructed. A five storey residential buildings with a five storey foundation will be constructed. In addition, medical and office equipment and furniture will be collected.

== See also ==
- List of medical colleges in Bangladesh
