= Sylhet MAG Osmani Medical College =

Medical college in Sylhet

- সিলেট এম.এ.জি ওসমানী মেডিকেল কলেজ
- Logo of Sylhet MAG Osmani Medical College
- Former name: Sylhet Medical College
- Type: Public medical school
- Established: 1962
- Academic affiliations: Sylhet Medical University
- Principal: Md Ziaur Rahman Chowdhury
- Academic staff: 160
- Administrative staff: 350
- Students: 1,400
- Undergraduates: 1,000
- Postgraduates: 400
- Location: Sylhet, Bangladesh; 24.9005°N 91.8532°E
- Campus: Urban
- Language: English
- Website: magosmanimedical.com

The Sylhet MAG Osmani Medical College (SOMC) (Bengali: সিলেট এম.এ.জি ওসমানী মেডিকেল কলেজ) is a government medical school in Bangladesh, established in 1962. It is located in Sylhet. Originally named "Sylhet Medical College", it was renamed in 1986 in the honour of General Muhammad Ataul Gani Osmani, commander-in-chief of Bangladesh Army during the Bangladesh War of Independence of 1971. The college is affiliated with Sylhet Medical University.

== Academics ==
Sylhet MAG Osmani Medical College offers undergraduate and graduate level courses in a variety of medical specializations.

The school publishes two academic journals which publish biannually

1. Osmani Medical Teacher's Association Journal (OMTAJ)
2. Bangladesh Medical Journal

== Campus ==
The college and hospital extends over an area of 206,355 square metres (51.0 acres) divided by newer and older construction. There are ten hostels (six male, four female) for student housing.

== Notable alumni ==
- Nasima Akhter, scientist
- Nurunnahar Fatema Begum, cardiologist, army officer
- Azharul Haque, physician, surgeon
- Nishat Jubaida, commandant of the Armed Forces Institute of Pathology
- Mohit Kamal, psychiatrist
- Shafiqur Rahman, Leader of the Opposition in Jatiya Sangsad; Ameer of Bangladesh Jamaat-e-Islami

== Gallery ==
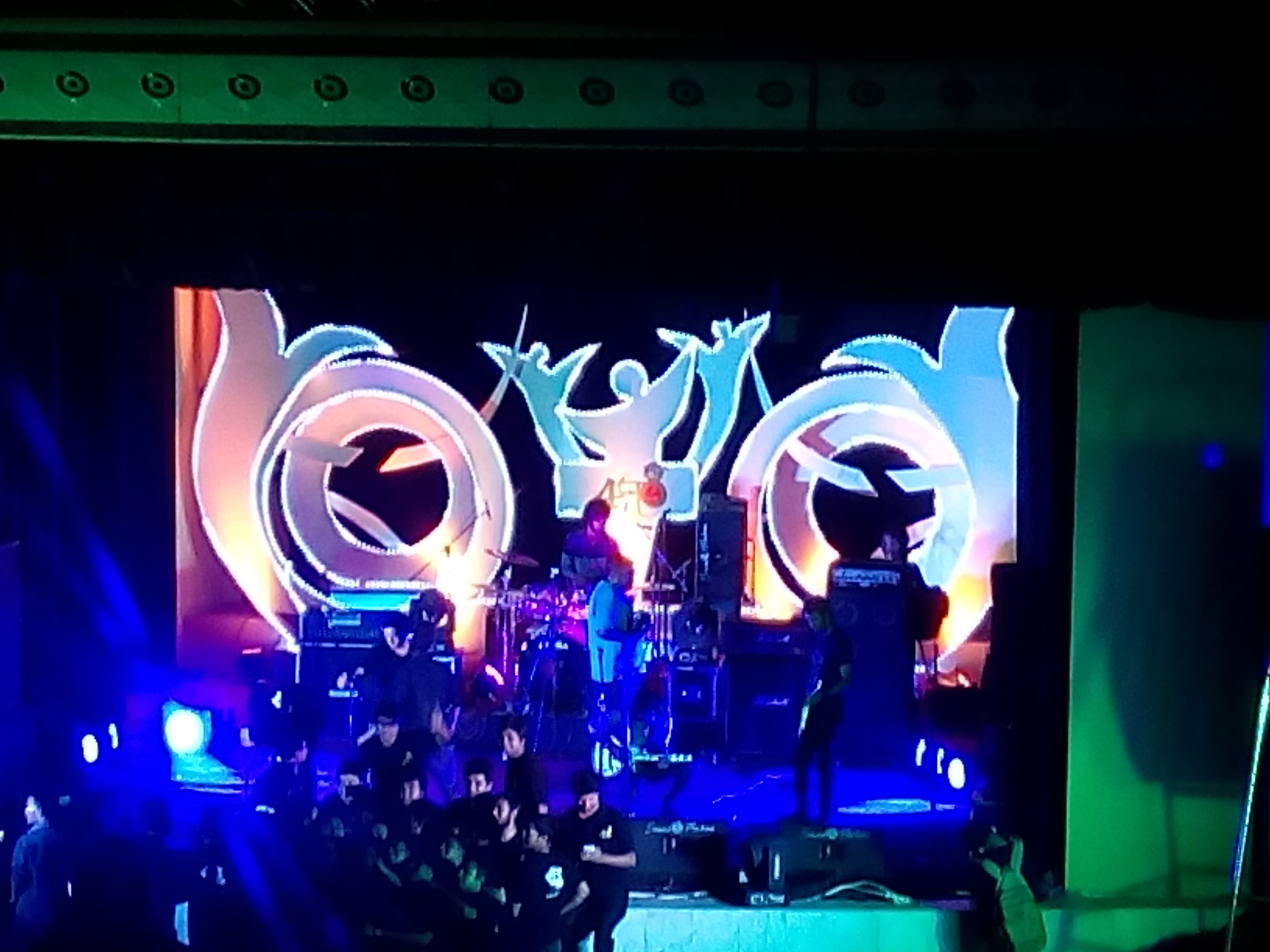
Students of Sylhet M.A.G Osmani Medical College performing in the college's intern ending program of 48th batch.

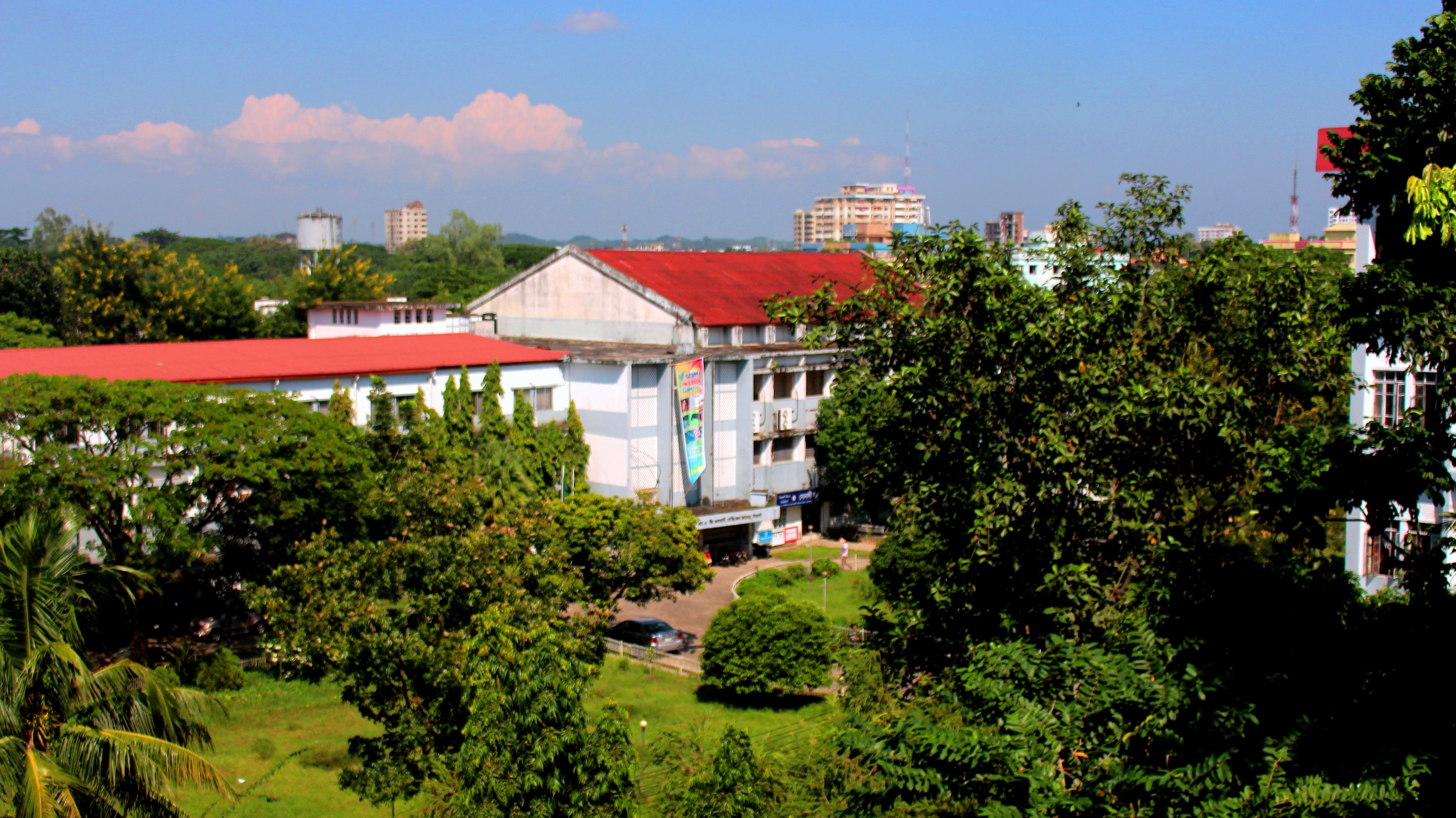

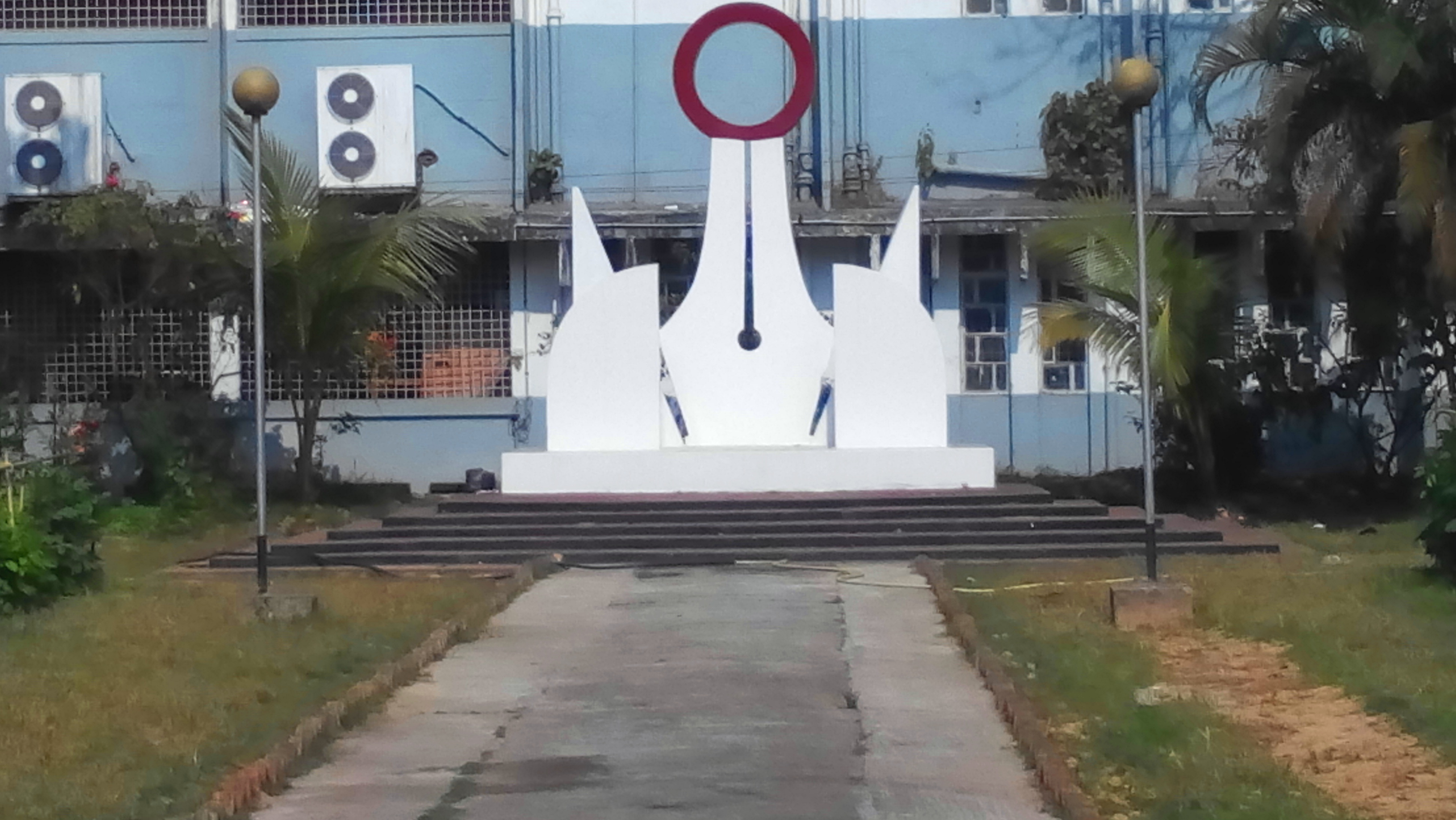

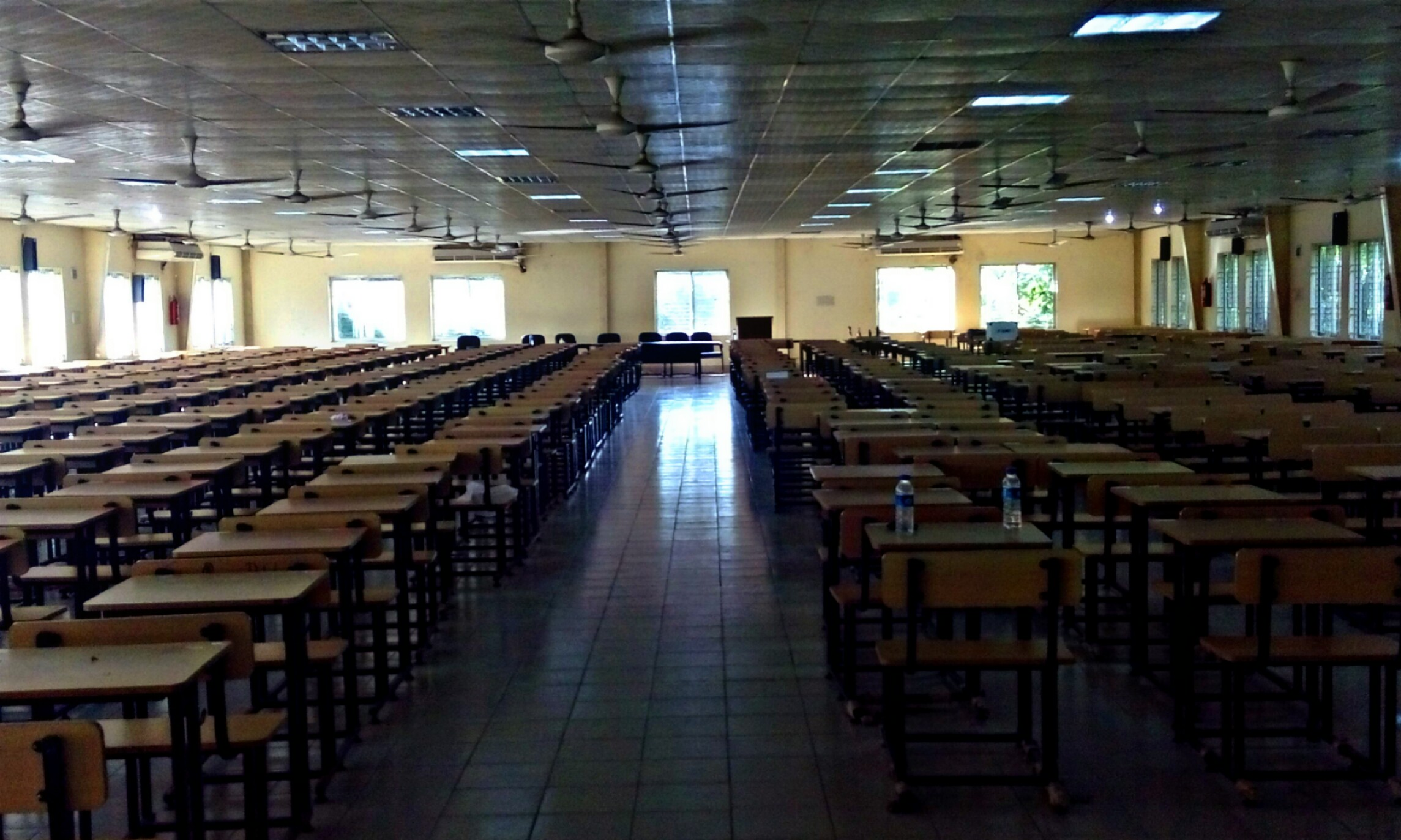
Exam hall

== See also ==
- List of medical colleges in Bangladesh
