= Sylhet Women's Medical College =

Private medical school in Sylhet, Bangladesh

- সিলেট মহিলা মেডিকেল কলেজ
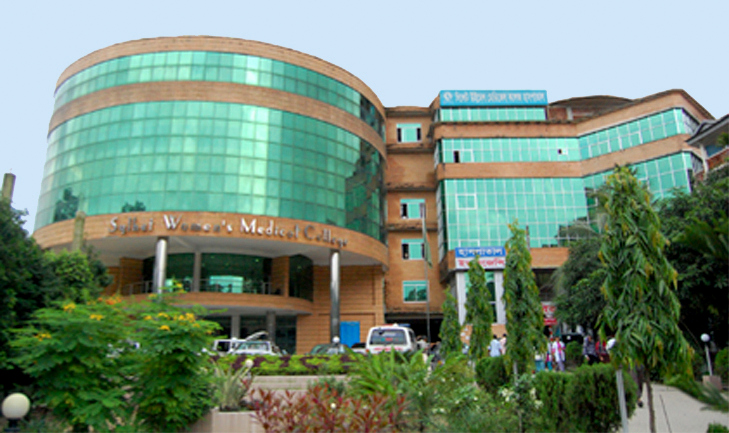
- Sylhet Women's Medical College Hospital
- Type: Private medical school
- Established: 2005
- Academic affiliations: SMU
- Chairman: Md. Aminul Haque Bhuyan
- Principal: Md. Ismail Patwary
- Academic staff: 118 (2014)
- Students: 500
- Location: Mirboxtola, Sylhet, Bangladesh; 24.8986°N 91.8725°E
- Campus: Urban
- Language: English
- Website: swmc.edu.bd

Sylhet Women's Medical College (SWMC) (Bengali: সিলেট মহিলা মেডিকেল কলেজ) is a private medical school in Bangladesh, exclusively for female students, established in 2005. Sylhet Women's Medical College and Hospital is a teaching and medical facility with 3 high-rise buildings built on 130,000 square feet of land in the heart of Sylhet.

It is located in Mirboxtola, in central Sylhet. It was previously affiliated with Shahjalal University of Science and Technology (SUST) under the School of Medical Sciences but as of 2019 it is now under Sylhet Medical University (SMU).

Its student population has international students from India, Nepal, the Middle East, Canada, the United Kingdom, and more.

It offers a five-year course of study leading to a Bachelor of Medicine, Bachelor of Surgery (MBBS) degree. A one-year internship after graduation is compulsory for all graduates. The degree is recognised by the Bangladesh Medical and Dental Council.

== History ==
Holy Sylhet Holding Limited (HSHL) established the college in 2005, and established Sylhet Women's Medical College Hospital the following year. Instruction began in 2006, and the hospital opened in 2007. HSHL intends to add a dental college and 4-year nursing college on the campus.

== Campus ==
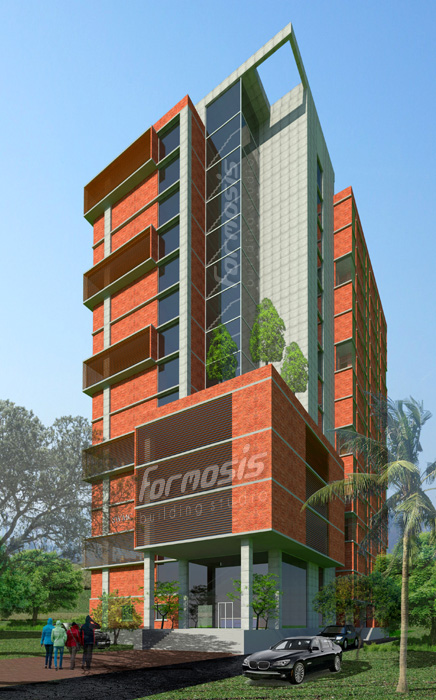
Sylhet Women's Medical College Hostel

The college is located in Mirboxtola, in central Sylhet, between the major intersections Chowhatta Point and Noya Sarak Point. There are two chief buildings on the 3 acres (1.2 ha) campus: one high-rise containing the college and another containing the associated 625-bed teaching hospital.

== Organization and faculties ==
The college was affiliated with Shahjalal University of Science and Technology (SUST) under the School of Medical Sciences. As of 2019, its affiliation has changed to Sylhet Medical University (SMU)

== Academics ==
The college offers a five-year course of study, approved by the Bangladesh Medical and Dental Council (BMDC), leading to a Bachelor of Medicine, Bachelor of Surgery (MBBS) degree from SUST. After passing the final professional examination, there is a compulsory one-year internship. The internship is a prerequisite for obtaining registration from the BMDC to practice medicine. In October 2014, the Ministry of Health and Family Welfare capped admission and tuition fees at private medical colleges at 1,990,000 Bangladeshi taka (US$25,750 as of 2014) total for the five-year course.

The college admits only female students. Admission for Bangladeshis to the MBBS programmes at all medical colleges in Bangladesh (government and private) is conducted centrally by the Directorate General of Health Services (DGHS). It administers a written multiple choice question exam simultaneously throughout the country. Candidates are admitted based primarily on their score on this test, although grades at Secondary School Certificate (SSC) and Higher Secondary School Certificate (HSC) level also play a part. As of January 2020, the college is allowed to admit 100 students annually, with 50% of the seats for foreign students Non-Bangladeshi students are mostly from India, Nepal and other South Asian countries.

== See also ==
- List of medical colleges in Bangladesh
