= Habiganj Agricultural University =

Public university in Sylhet Division, Bangladesh

Coordinates: 24.34771°N 91.42695°E

- হবিগঞ্জ কৃষি বিশ্ববিদ্যালয়
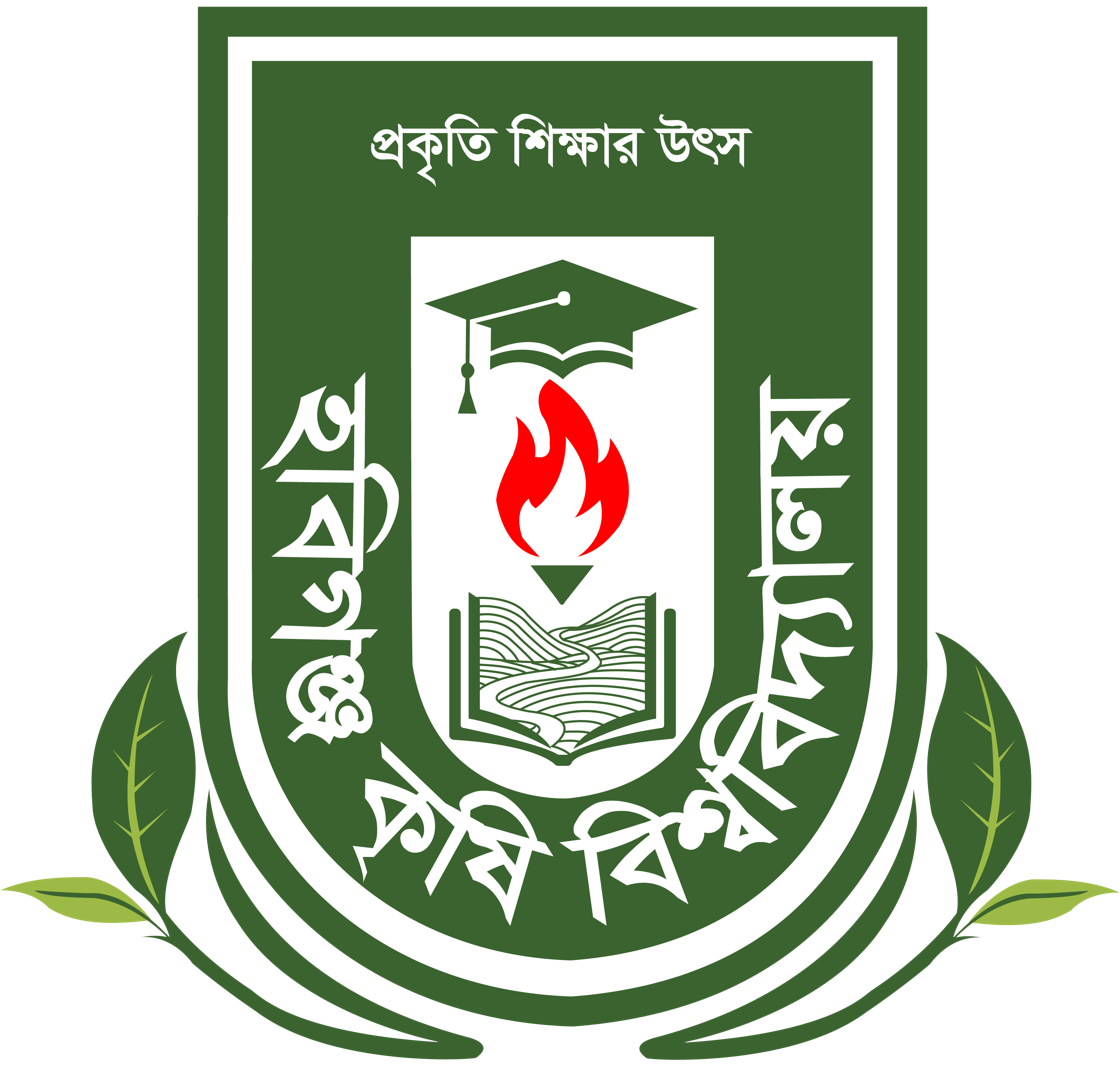
- Type: Public
- Established: 2020
- Chancellor: President Mirza Fakhrul Islam Alamgir
- Vice-Chancellor: Syed Sayeem Uddin Ahmed
- Location: Habiganj, Bangladesh
- Website: hau.ac.bd

Habiganj Agricultural University (HAU) (Bengali: হবিগঞ্জ কৃষি বিশ্ববিদ্যালয়) is a public agricultural university in Sylhet Division, Bangladesh, established in 2020. It is located at Vadoi, Habiganj Sadar Upazila, Habiganj.

== History ==
On 24 December 2019, the Cabinet of Bangladesh approved Habiganj Agricultural University Act, 2019 to establish the Habiganj Agricultural University.

== Faculty of Agriculture ==
Department of Land Management

- Soil Science
- Agricultural Chemistry

Department of Crop Production

- Agronomy
- Horticulture
- Agroforestry

Department of Plant Protection

- Entomology
- Plant Pathology

Department of Plant Sciences

- Genetics and Plant Breeding
- Agricultural Botany

Department of Allied Agricultural Sciences

- Agricultural Extension
- Environmental Scienece

== Faculty of Science and Technology ==
Department of Computing and Language

- Computer Science
- Language Science

Department of Biological Sciences

- Biochemistry and Molecular Biology
- Genetics and Biotechnology

Department of Biometry

- Statistics
- Mathematics

Department of Data Science and Modelling

- Data Science
- Spatial Informatics

== Faculty Veterinary Medicine and Animal Science ==
Department of Preclinical Sciences

- Anatomy
- Physiology

Department of Clinical Sciences

- Veterinary Surgery
- Epidemiology and Polulation Veterinary Medicine
- Clinical Veterinary Medicine
- Theriogenelogy

Department of Animal Sciences

- Animal Nutrition and Feed Technology
- Animal Science
- Genetics and Animal Breeding

Department of Paraclinical Sciences

- Parasitology
- Microbiology and Public Health
- Pathology
- Pharmacology

Department of Animal Production

- Meat Production
- Poultry Procuction
- Dairy Production

== Faculty of Fisheries ==
Department of Aquaculture and Fish Production

- Aquaculture Technology and Nutrition
- Aquaculture

Department of Aquatic Animal Health

- Aquatic Animal Health Management
- Fish Pathogens and Pathology

Department of Fisheries Resource Management

- Inland Aquatic Resource Management
- Coastal and Marine Fisheries Management

Department of Aquatic Food Science and Quality Assurance

- Fisheries Technology
- Aquatic Product Development and Quality Control

Department of Fisheries Biology and Genetics

- Fisheries Genetics and Breeding
- Fisheries Biology and Biodiversity

== Residential halls ==
Habiganj Agricultural University has one boys' hall and one ladies' hall.

== Gallery ==
HAU campus (front)

HAU campus ( temporary)

HAU campus (backyard)

Field

Imperial hall (academic building 2)

== List of vice-chancellors ==
- Md Abdul Baset
- Syed Sayeem Uddin Ahmed (present)
