= Parkview Medical College =

Private medical college in Sylhet

- পার্কভিউ মেডিকেল কলেজ
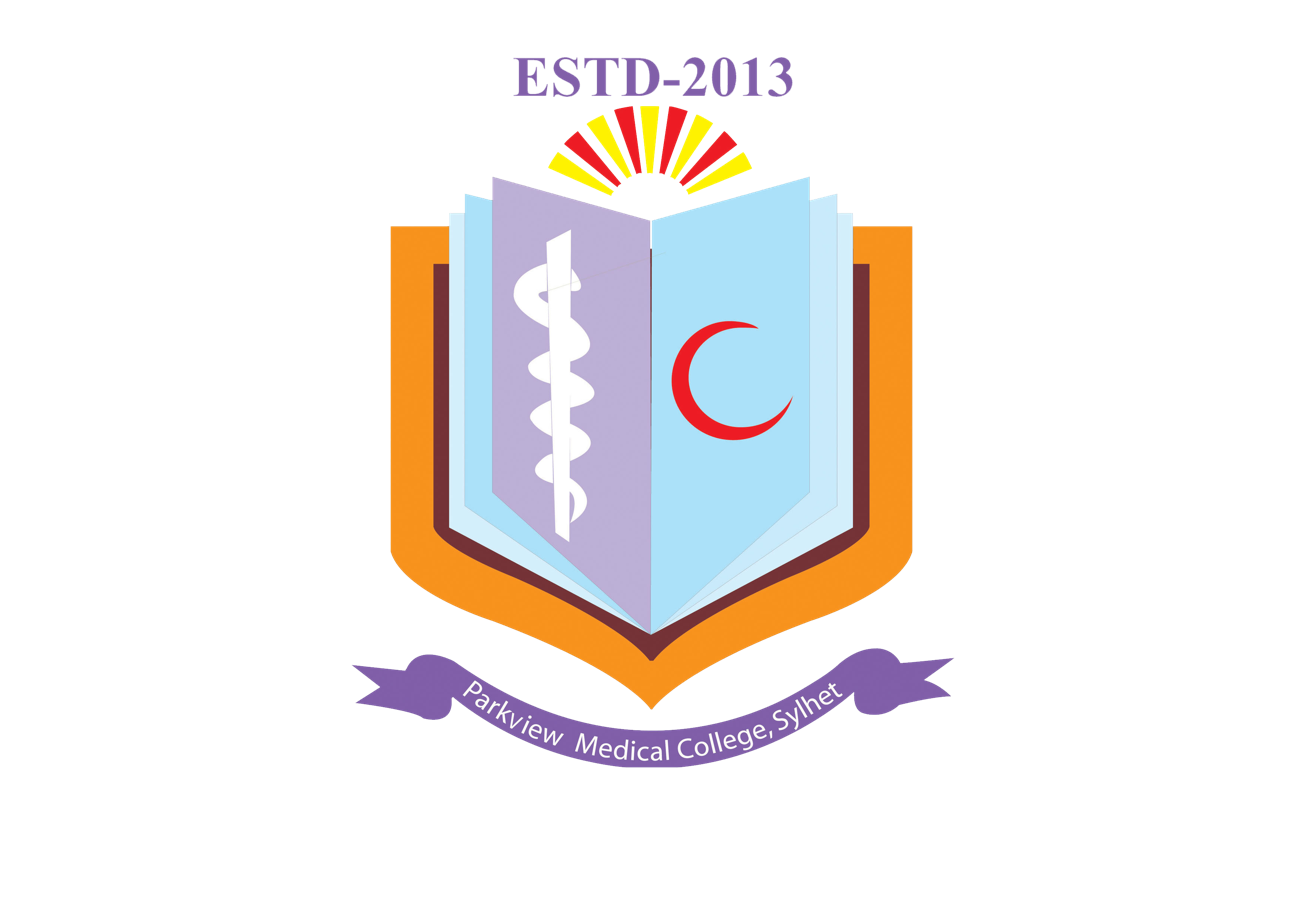
- Emblem of Parkview Medical College
- Type: Private Medical School Medical College & Hospital
- Established: 2013; 13 years ago
- Academic affiliations: Shahjalal University of Science and Technology (SUST) previously, Sylhet Medical University currently (since 2019)
- Chairman: Md. Badrul Haque Rukan
- Principal: Dilip Kumar Bhowmik
- Academic staff: 200
- Location: VIP Road, Taltola, Sylhet, Bangladesh; 24.8907°N 91.8625°E
- Campus: Urban
- Language: English
- Nickname: PMC
- Website: pmch.edu.bd

Parkview Medical College (PMC; Bengali: পার্কভিউ মেডিকেল কলেজ) is a private medical school in Bangladesh, established in 2013. It is located in VIP Road, Taltola, Sylhet. It is affiliated with Sylhet Medical University also known as Bangamata Sheikh Fazilatunnesa Mujib Medical University, under the School of Medical Sciences. The college is associated with 500-bed Parkview Medical College Hospital.

It offers a five-year course of study leading to a Bachelor of Medicine, Bachelor of Surgery (MBBS) degree.

== History ==
The idea started in 2008 under the banner of Parkview Health Care Pvt. Ltd. & Associates of Parkview Health Care Pvt. Ltd. As a consequence, Parkview Medical College was established in 2013 and has opened its door to 1st batch students of MBBS course from January 2014.

== Campus ==
The college is located in the VIP Road, Taltola, Sylhet. Total floor space of College is 3.7 acres (1.5 ha) And total floor space of hospital is 5.79 acres (2.34 ha). The college's academic building is attached to a 500-bed teaching hospital, Parkview Medical College Hospital.

== Organization and administration ==
The college was affiliated with Shahjalal University of Science and Technology (SUST) under the School of Medical Sciences. As of 2019 its affiliation has changed to Sylhet Medical University also known as Bangamata Sheikh Fazilatunnesa Mujib Medical University, Sylhet. The Chairman of the Governing Body is Md. Badrul Haque Rukan, and the Principal is Dilip Kumar Bhowmik.

== Academics ==
The college offers a five-year course of study, approved by the Bangladesh Medical and Dental Council (BMDC), leading to a Bachelor of Medicine, Bachelor of Surgery (MBBS) degree from SUST. After passing the final professional examination, there is a compulsory one-year internship. The internship is a prerequisite for obtaining registration from the BMDC to practice medicine. In October 2014, the Ministry of Health and Family Welfare capped admission and tuition fees at private medical colleges at 1,990,000 Bangladeshi taka (US$25,750 as of 2014) total for their five-year courses.

Admission for Bangladeshis to the MBBS programme at all medical colleges in Bangladesh (government and private) is conducted centrally by the Directorate General of Health Services (DGHS). It administers a written multiple choice question exam simultaneously throughout the country. Candidates are admitted based primarily on their score on this test, although grades at Secondary School Certificate (SSC) and Higher Secondary School Certificate (HSC) level also play a part. Seats are reserved, according to quotas set by the Directorate General of Health Services (DGHS), for children of Freedom Fighters and for students from underprivileged backgrounds. Admission for foreign students is based on their SSC and HSC or equivalent grades. As of July 2024, the college is allowed to admit 82 students annually.

== See also ==
- List of medical colleges in Bangladesh
