= Sylhet Medical University =

Bangladeshi medical university in Sylhet

- সিলেট মেডিকেল বিশ্ববিদ্যালয়
- Logo of SMU
- Former names: Bangamata Sheikh Fazilatunessa Mujib Medical University, Sylhet
- Type: Government medical university
- Established: 2018; 8 years ago
- Accreditation: University Grants Commission of Bangladesh
- Chancellor: President Mirza Fakhrul Islam Alamgir
- Vice-Chancellor: Dr. A. H. M. Enayet Hussain
- Location: Mollargaon, Dakshin Surma, Sylhet, Bangladesh; 24.9011°N 91.8692°E
- Campus: Rural, 80.31 acres (32.50 ha)
- Website: smu.edu.bd

Sylhet Medical University is a public medical university situated in Sylhet, Bangladesh. It has been established to supervise all medical colleges in Sylhet Division.

== Affiliated College ==
=== Medical colleges ===
Public

- Sylhet MAG Osmani Medical College
- Habiganj Medical College
- Sunamganj Medical College

Private

- Jalalabad Ragib-Rabeya Medical College
- North East Medical College
- Parkview Medical College
- Sylhet Women's Medical College

=== Dental colleges ===
Public

- Sylhet MAG Osmani Medical College Dental Unit

Private

- Sylhet Central Dental College

== History ==
Many medical colleges have been established in the country for commercial reasons. Many closed medical colleges have been started due to court order. According to the Prime Minister's order to strictly monitor whether medical standards are being properly maintained in medical colleges, a medical university will be set up in each division. According to the order, Chittagong and Rajshahi Medical University have already been established. Sylhet Medical University is the fourth medical university of the directive.

After the fall of the Sheikh Hasina-led Awami League government, on 13 April 2025, the interim government of Bangladesh issued an ordinance naming the university from Bangamata Sheikh Fazilatunessa Mujib Medical University, Sylhet to Sylhet Medical University.

== List of vice-chancellors ==
- Murshed Ahmed Chowdhury (2018–2023)
- A. H. M. Enayet Hussain (2023–present)
