= Daily Jalalabad =

Bangladeshi daily newspaper

Daily Jalalabad; দৈনিক জালালাবাদ
- Founder(s): Muqtabis Un Noor
- Editor: Muqtabis Un Noor
- Founded: August 1, 1993; 32 years ago
- Language: Bengali
- City: Sylhet
- Country: Bangladesh
- Website: Website; E-Paper

Daily Jalalabad (Note: Bengali: দৈনিক জালালাবাদ, romanized: Dainika jālālābāda) is a local Bengali-language daily newspaper in Sylhet, Bangladesh.

== History ==
On 1 August 1993, Daily Jalalabad was established by Muqtabis Un Noor.

During the Student-People's uprising, Daily Jalalabad supported the uprising against the Awami League regime and a journalist of Daily Jalalabad, named Abu Taher Md Turab, was killed by pro-government forces, UNESCO condemned the killing of journalists including the killing of Abu Taher Md Turab.

== Editorship and Publication ==
The name of the editor is Muqtabis Un Noor. Its office is located in the 3rd floor of the Qudratullah Mosque Complex in Bondorbazar, Sylhet, Bangladesh. It is published digitally and on paper.

== See also ==
- List of newspapers in Bangladesh
- Bengali-language newspapers
- Desh Rupantor
- The Daily Dinkal
