= Habiganj =

City in Bangladesh

Habiganj হবিগঞ্জ
- City
- Location in Sylhet division Location in Bangladesh
- Coordinates: 24°22′51″N 91°24′52″E
- Country: Bangladesh
- Division: Sylhet
- District: Habiganj
- Upazila: Habiganj Sadar

Government
  - Type: Mayor–Council
  - Body: Habiganj Municipality
  - Paura Mayor: Awal.ma.sheik

Area
  - Total: 14.10 km^{2} (5.44 sq mi)

Population (2022)
  - Total: 85,628
  - Density: 6,073/km^{2} (15,730/sq mi)
- Time zone: UTC+6 (BST)

Habiganj Municipality mahallah geocode map

Habiganj (Bengali: হবিগঞ্জ), is a major town and district headquarters of Habiganj District in the division of Sylhet, Bangladesh, with a population of about 86,000.

== Railroad ==
- Habiganj Bazar–Shaistaganj–Balla line

Shaistaganj-Habiganj railroad section's four railway station established by Assam Bengal railway 1928

- Habiganj Bazar
- Habiganj Court
- Dhuliakhal
- Paikpara

Shaistaganj Junction

N.B.: Shaistaganj railway station established by Assam Bengal railway 1903. In 1928-29 when the Habiganj Bazar-Shaistaganj-Balla railway link was opened, it became a junction railway station.

Shaistaganj-Chunarughat railroad section's seven railway station established by Assam Bengal railway 1929

- Barkota
- Sakir Muhammed
- Sutang Bazar
- Chunarughat
- Amu Road
- Assampara
- Balla

Habiganj Bazar–Shaistaganj–Balla line During the colonial British rule, train services were started by rail at Habiganj Mahukuma in Sylhet district of the then (Undivided British-India) Assam province. In 1928, the British government built the Habiganj Bazar-Shaistaganj-Balla line as railway line and built infrastructure.

The railway line was opened by the Assam Bengal Railway by the then British government from Habiganj district headquarters town to Balla border via Shaistaganj junction, about 45 or 52 kilometers long railway line.

Of these, the Shaistaganj-Habiganj (15 or 16 km) railway line was inaugurated in 1928 and the Shaistaganj-Balla (30 or 36 km) railway line was inaugurated in 1929.

Coal-engined trains used to run between eight stations at Habiganj Bazar, Habiganj Court, Shaistaganj Junction, Shakir Mohammad, Chunarughat, Amuroad, Assampara and Balla bordering Tripura.

Of these, Chunarughat, Amur road and Assampara stations were of great importance. Tea produced in 22 tea gardens from those three stations was transported by rail.

At that time, this railway was the only means of exporting tea leaves of 13 gardens of Chunarughat upazila of Habiganj at a low cost and importing related items including garden rations.

There are a total of 4 stations on the Shaistaganj-Habiganj railway line (excluding Shaistaganj Junction), namely: Habiganj Bazar, Habiganj Court, Dhuliakhal and Paikpara. The Shaistaganj-Balla railway line has a total of 7 stations (excluding Shaistaganj Junction), namely: Barkula, Shakir Muhammed, Sutang Bazar, Chunarughat, Amu Road, Assampara and Balla.

After the independence of Bangladesh, the importance of the Balla train increased further. For this reason, the railway authorities built two more stations named Sutang Bazar and Barkula, known as remote areas.

At that time, the role of the train in bringing back refugees from India was commendable. At that time, a diesel engine was added to the ballar train. The train used to travel twice a day from Habiganj to the border station Balla.

After the end of the refugee transportation phase, the smugglers took over the train in Balla. Later, the train of Balla became a train of smugglers. At first, the passengers protested about this, but later the passengers got the opportunity to travel without a ticket.

In such a situation, the running train suffered losses. The railway authorities suspended the renovation work of the railway line. The train continues at great risk. The speed comes down to 15 kilometers.

During the tenure of the military ruler Ershad government, the train movement on this route was stopped unannounced for the first time. In the face of the movement of passengers, the train started running again within a week. A few days after the BNP came to power in 1991, the movement of the ballar train was again stopped unannounced.

Various social organizations started a movement demanding the movement of trains. For this reason, the government decided to run the train under private management. After running under private management for some time, the train was stopped again.

After the Awami League government came to power in 1996, the then Finance Minister late Shah AMS Kibria, (Member of parliament) elected from Habiganj Sadar-Lakhai Upazila (Habiganj-3) constituency, under the sincere political efforts of the late Shah AMS Kibria, the railway line was upgraded in 2000. Although the train service was started, the last train movement on this line was stopped in 2003.

Ever since the undeclared closure of the BNP-Jamaat coalition government, an influential quarter has been looking at the huge resources of the railways. Around 2005, about 15 kilometers of railway line from Habiganj Bazar to Shaistaganj railway junction was removed on the pretext of making a road. Later, the railway line from Shaistaganj to Habiganj was lifted and a bypass road was constructed.

The Habiganj-Balla train could not be restarted even after a long time. Railway land worth crores of rupees has been occupied by breaking the name of politics. Railway employees who used to stay at different stations are also living by occupying railway land and constructing buildings. Some employees are pocketing money by constructing buildings on railway land and installing tenants.

In 2003, the railway line was abandoned after the train service on this route was stopped. Since then, railway property worth crores of rupees has been looted. In the meantime, valuable equipment of the road and furniture of the station house have been looted.

Now the railway land is being occupied. A section of people are occupying these lands and building buildings. They are cultivating various crops. The name of Shaistaganj Junction is associated with the abandoned railway line. The locals demanded that the train be restarted on this railway line soon to protect the tradition of the junction.

After the Awami League government came to power in 2008, railway minister late Suranjit Sengupta was accorded a reception by the people of Shaistaganj. At that time, he assured that the Balla train would be started within a few days. When Suranjit Sen became a political victim, the train from Habiganj Sadar to Balla could not be started again.

The train from Habiganj Sadar to Balla is still closed. Locals said four of the habiganj-Shaistaganj-Balla railway stations are located in Habiganj Sadar upazila and seven in Chunarughat upazila. Shaistaganj Junction in Shaistaganj Upazila. That is why on the eve of the 11th parliamentary election, various demands were raised from the common people, including the introduction of the Ballar train from Habiganj Sadar, the recovery of the land of the train.

During the election campaign, Awami League leaders also assured to start the Ballar train from Habiganj Sadar, but even after the past years, no word has been uttered from the leaders about the introduction of the train. The expectations of the people of Chunarughat-Madhabpur upazila (Habiganj-4) have increased a lot after Mahbub Ali, (Member of parliament), became the state minister for civil aviation and tourism.

Locals think Minister Mahbub Ali can restart the Balla train from Habiganj Bazar i.e. Habiganj Sadar to Chunarughat Balla Land Port, the tradition of the area and Habiganj district.

Railway History

The Habiganj Bazar–Shaistaganj–Balla line is a railway line connecting Akhaura and Chhatak, via Kulaura in Bangladesh. This line is under the jurisdiction of Bangladesh Railway. Shaistaganj Junction railway station is a junction station situated in Shayestaganj Upazila of Habiganj District in Bangladesh. It was opened in 1903 on Akhaura–Kulaura–Chhatak line. Then it became a junction station when Habiganj Bazar–Shaistaganj–Balla line railway was opened in 1928–29. But later in 2003, that line was abandoned as is closed in an unannounced manner and in 2005, the Habiganj Bazar–Shaistaganj line was taken off.

In response to the demands of the Assam tea planters for a railway link to Chittagong port, Assam Bengal Railway started construction of a railway track on the eastern side of Bengal in 1891. A 150 kilometres (93 mi) track between Chittagong and Comilla was opened to traffic in 1895. The Comilla–Akhaura–Kulaura–Badarpur section was opened in 1896–98 and extended to Lumding by 1903.

The Kulaura-Sylhet section was opened 1912–15, the Shaistaganj-Habiganj branch line in 1928, the Shaistaganj–Balla branch line in 1929 and the Sylhet–Chhatak Bazar line in 1954.

A metre gauge link exists between Shahbajpur in Bangladesh and Mahisasan in India.

== Demographics ==
Religions in Habiganj (2011)
Religion	Percent
Islam	74.68%
Hinduism	25.05%
Other or not stated	0.27%

According to the 2022 Bangladesh census, Habiganj city had a population of 85,628 and a literacy rate of 87.11%.

According to the 2011 Bangladesh census, Habiganj city had 13,517 households and a population of 69,512. 14,721 (21.18%) were under 10 years of age. Habiganj had a literacy rate (age 7 and over) of 71.34%, compared to the national average of 51.8%, and a sex ratio of 987 females per 1000 males.

== Archaeological heritage ==
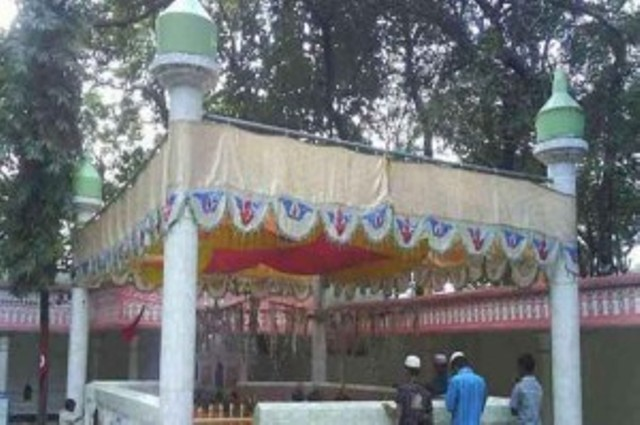
Mazar Sharif of Syed Nasir Uddin, Murarband Darbar Sharif

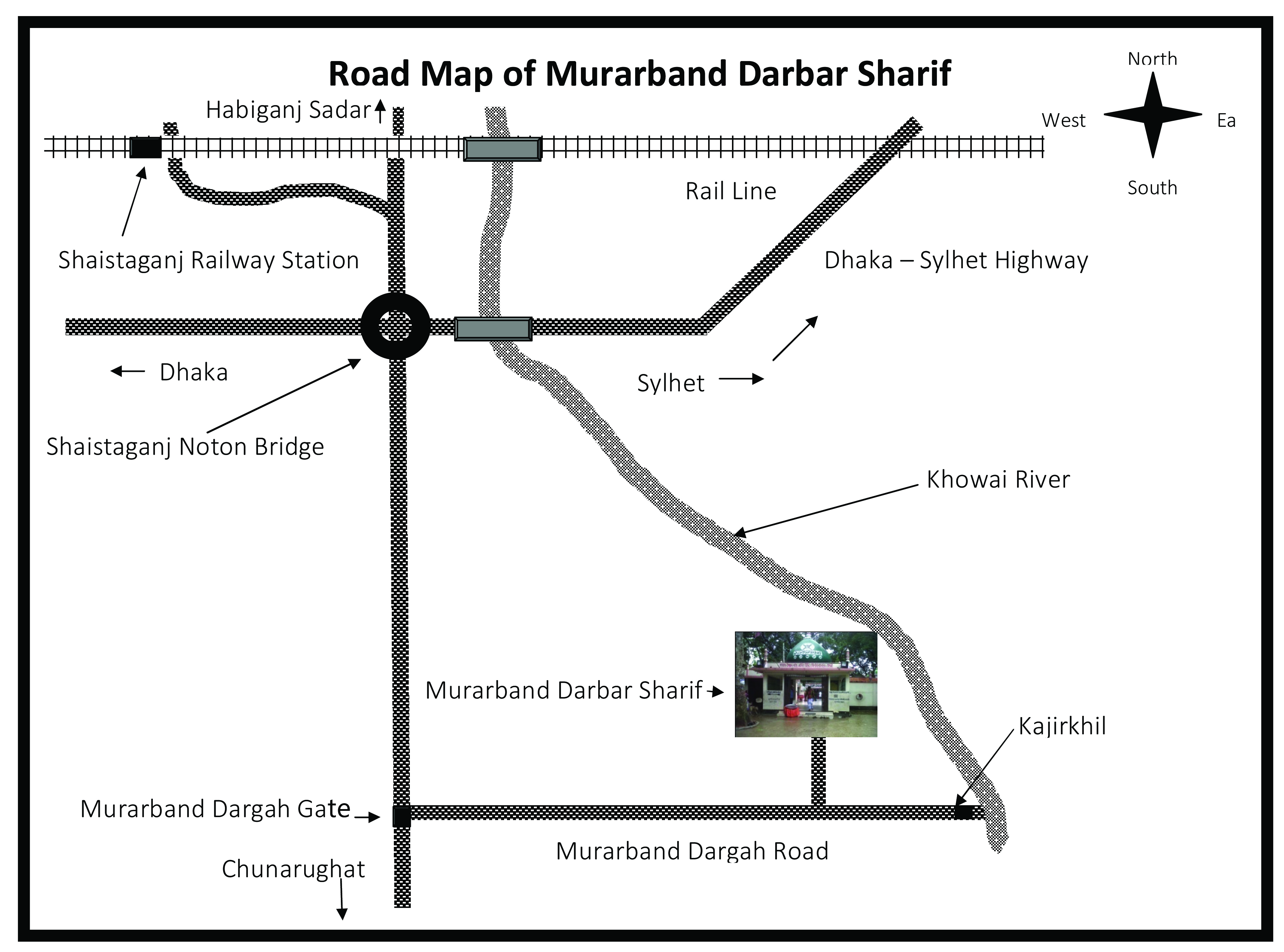
Road Map of Murarband Darbar Sharif

=== Habiganj Sadar ===
- Habiganj Chief Judicial Magistrate District Court, Habiganj Sadar
- Habiganj Bar Association (Traditional), Habiganj Sadar
- Habiganj Municipal Building (Foundation & Established on 16 December 1940), Habiganj Sadar
- Habiganj Bazar–Shaistaganj–Balla line (Established 1928-1929)
- Habiganj Bazar Railway station, Habiganj Sadar
- Habiganj Court Railway station, Habiganj Sadar
- Duliakhal Railway station, Habiganj Sadar
- Paikpara Railway station, Habiganj Sadar
- Habiganj Govt.Technical School and College, Habiganj Sadar
- Habiganj Police Line, Habiganj Sadar
- Habiganj Govt. Polytechnical Institute, Habiganj Sadar
- Habiganj Agriculture University (Public), Habiganj Sadar
- Habiganj Medical University (Public), Habiganj Sadar
- Habiganj Govt. High School, Habiganj Sadar
- Habiganj High School & College, Habiganj Sadar
- Habiganj Brindaban Government College, Habiganj Sadar (Established 1931)
- Habiganj Mahila College, Habiganj Sadar
- Habiganj Law College, Habiganj Sadar
- Mashulia Akhra, Habiganj Sadar
- Christian Church Missionary, Habiganj Sadar
- Ramakrishna Ashram, Habiganj Sadar
- Uchail Mosque, Habiganj Sadar
- Bagala Matar Mandir, Habiganj
- Kalibari, Habiganj Sadar

=== Shaistaganj ===
- Shaistaganj Junction Railway station, Shaistaganj Upazila

=== Chunarughat ===
- Rema-Kalenga Wildlife Sanctuary, Chunarughat Upazila
- Shankarpasha Shahi Masjid, Chunarughat Upazila
- Murarband Dargah Sharif, Chunarughat
- Hujra Khana of Syed Nasir Uddin, Murarbandar Dargah Sharif, Chunarughat.
- Shajeerbazar, Chunarughat Upazila
- Barkota Railway Station, Chunarughat Upazila
- Sakir Muhammad Railway Station, Chunarughat Upazila
- Sutang Bazar Railway Station, Chunarughat Upazila
- Chunarughat Railway Station, Chunarughat Upazila
- Ancient limestone quarries, Chunarughat
- Tea Gardens of Chunarughat
- Amu Road Railway Station, Chunarughat Upazila
- Assampara Railway Station, Chunarughat Upazila
- Balla Railway Station, Chunarughat Upazila
- Balla Land Port (Bangladesh's no. 23 border land port) Balla, Chunarughat
- Balla Border Check Post Custom & Immigration Authority, Chunarughat Upazila

=== Bahubal ===
- The Place (Putijuri Resort), Bahubal
- Jami Mosque, Bahubal
- Putijuri Jami Mosque, Bahubal
- Rashidpur Tea Garden, Bahubal Upazila
- Satiajuri Railway Station, Bahubal Upazila

=== Nabiganj ===
- Dorga-tila, Mira-tila and Tangee-tila, Nabiganj
- Foltoli-tila and water fountain, Nabiganj
- Kuri-tila, Black-stone and an Ancient Rajbari, Dinarpur, Nabiganj
- War of Liberation Mass Grave, Nabiganj
- War of Liberation Memorial Monument, Nabiganj

=== Baniachanj ===
- Ancient Rajbari (1737–38) at Puranbagh, Baniachang
- Baniachong village (the biggest village in Asia)
- Bibir Dargah Mosque, Baniachang
- Bithangal Akhra, Baniachang
- Shagor(Komola) Dighi, Baniachong
- Sham-baoul Akhra and Doulotpur Akhra, Baniachang
- Kalarduba Tourist Center, Baniachong

=== Ajmiriganj ===
- Chouki court
- River Port

=== Madhabpur ===
- Teliapara war monument, Madhabpur Upazila
- Teliapara Railway Station
- Industrial park area

=== Lakhai ===
- Krishnapur slaughtered land grave (Bangladesh Liberation war 1971), Lakhai Upazila

== Education ==
The literacy rate of Habiganj city is 60 percent. List of Important Educational Institutions:

- Habiganj Agricultural University
- Sheikh Hasina Medical College, Habiganj
- Brindavan Government College
- Habiganj Government Women's College
- Habiganj Government High School
- Aleya Zaheer College
