= List of colleges in Bangladesh =

Colleges in Bangladesh are Higher Secondary schools for last two years of 12 academic year long school education. After finishing Secondary education (10th Grade/SSC/Equivalent) students get admitted to these colleges to study for 11th and 12th Grade. Students graduate from the colleges or higher secondary schools after passing in the HSC/Equivalent Examination. This is a list of Colleges in Bangladesh. The syllabus most common in usage is the National Curriculum and Textbooks, which has two versions, a Bengali version and an English version. Edexcel and Cambridge syllabus are also used for most of the English-medium schools.

Name	Established	Location
A		
Abdul Kadir Mollah City College	2006	Narsingdi
Adamjee Cantonment College	1960	Dhaka Cantonment, Dhaka
Adhyapak Abdul Majid College	1995	Comilla
Aeronautical College of Bangladesh		
Aeronautical Institute of Bangladesh	1999	Dhaka
Agricultural University College, Mymensingh	1985	Mymensingh
Agriculture Training Institute	1947	Noakhali
Ahammad Uddin Shah Shishu Niketon School & College	1982	
Amrita Lal Dey College	1992	Barisal
Alekanda Govt. College		Barisal
Ananda Mohan College		Mymensingh
Atomic Energy Research Establishment School and College		
Azam Khan Govt. Commerce College		
B		
Bakalia Shahid N M M J Degree College		Chittagong
Bangla College		Dhaka
Bir Uttam Shaheed Samad School & College	1974	Rangpur
BAF Shaheen College Dhaka		Dhaka Cantonment, Dhaka
BAF Shaheen College Kurmitola		Dhaka Cantonment
BAF Shaheen College Chittagong		Patenga, Chittagong
Bangladesh Institute of Glass and Ceramics		
Bangladesh Institute of Marine Technology		
Bangladesh Marine Academy		
Bangladesh Navy College Dhaka		Dhaka
Bangladesh Sweden Polytechnic Institute		Rangamati
Birshestha Munshi Abdur Rouf Public College		Dhaka
Barishal Engineering College		Barisal
Barisal Government Women's College		Barisal
Barisal Polytechnic Institute		Barisal
BCIC College	1983	Dhaka
Bhandaria Government College		
Bijoy Smarani University College		
BPATC School and College		
Brahmanbaria Government College		Brahmanbaria
Brajalal College		
Brindaban Government College		
Brojomohun College		
C		
Cox's bazar government college		Cox's bazar
Cantonment Public School and College, Momenshahi		Mymensingh
Cantonment Public School and College, Rangpur		Rangpur
Carmichael College		
Chandpur Polytechnic Institute		Chandpur
Charfasson Govt. College		Bhola
Chittagong College		Chittagong
Chittagong Ideal School & College		Chittagong
Chittagong Model School and College		Chittagong
Chittagong Pali College		Chittagong
Chowmuhani Government S.A College		Noakhali
College of Aviation & Technology		
College of Development Alternative		
Cumilla Government College		Comilla
Comilla Government Women's College		Comilla
Comilla Victoria Government College		Comilla
D		
Dania College		Dhaka
Daffodil International College		Dhaka
Daffodil College Uttara (DCU)	2017	Uttara, Dhaka
Dhaka City College		Dhaka
Dhaka College		Dhaka
Dhaka Commerce College		Dhaka
Dhaka Imperial College		Dhaka
Dhaka Polytechnic Institute		Dhaka
Dhaka Residential Model College		Dhaka
Dinajpur Government College		Dinajpur
Dinajpur Polytechnique Institute		Dinajpur
E
Eden Mohila College		Dhaka
Engineering University School & College		Dhaka
F		
Faridpur Engineering College		Faridpur
Faridpur Polytechnic Institute		Faridpur
Feni Government College		Feni
Feni Polytechnic Institute		Feni
G		
Government Saadat College	1926	Tangail
Gazipur Cantonment College		Gazipur
Gachbaria Govt. College		Chandanish, Chittagong
Gole Afroz College		
Gopaldi Nazrul Islam Babu College		
Government Akbar Ali College		
Government Azizul Haque College		
Government Barisal College		Barisal
Government City College, Chittagong		Chittagong
Government College of Commerce, Chittagong		Chittagong
Government Debendra College		
Government Hazi Mohammad Mohshin College		
Government K. M. H. College		
Government K.C. College Jhenaidah		Jhenaidah
Government P.C. College, Bagerhat		Bagerhat
Government Physical Education College, Dhaka		Dhaka
Government Rajendra College		Faridpur
Government Shaheed Suhrawardy College		Dhaka
Government Science College, Dhaka		Dhaka
Govt. Haraganga College		Munshiganj
Government Tolaram College		Narayanganj
Government Titumir College		Dhaka
Tangail Government Mohila College		Tangail
Gurudayal Government College		Kishoreganj
Gunabati College		
H		
Haji Abul Hossain Institute of Technology		
Hathazari Government University College		
Hazera Taju University College		
Heyako Banani University College		
Holy Cross College, Dhaka		Dhaka
Hamdard Public College	2010	Dhaka
I		
Ibne Taimiya School and College		Comilla
Ideal School and College		Dhaka
Ideal College		Dhaka
Institute of Leather Engineering and Technology, University of Dhaka		Dhaka
Ishwarganj Degree College		Mymensingh
Islamia Government College		
Ispahani Public School & College		Comilla
J		
Jahangirpur Govt. College		
Government Ashek Mahmud College		Jamalpur
Uttara Government College		
Joypurhat Government College		
K		
Kabi Nazrul Government College		
Khulna Govt. Girls College		Khulna
Khulna Public College		Khulna
Kurigram Government College		Kurigram
M		
M. E. H. Arif College		
Madan Mohan College		
Madhupur College		
Madhupur Shahid Smrity Higher Secondary School		
Maulana Mohammad Ali College		
Mohammadpur Government College		Dhaka
Mirpur Bangla High School and College		Dhaka
Mohammadpur Model School & College		Dhaka
Mohammadpur Preparatory School & College		Dhaka
Muminunnesa Women's College		
Murari Chand College		Sylhet
Mymensingh Polytechnic Institute		Mymensingh
N		
Notre Dame College, Dhaka	1949	Motijheel, Dhaka
Naogaon Government College		
Narail Victoria College		Narail
Narayanganj Government Mohila College		Narayanganj
Nawab Faizunnesa Government College	1943	Comilla
Nazipur Government College		
Nazirhat College		Chittagong
New Government Degree College, Rajshahi		Rajshahi
Noakhali Government College		Noakhali
Noakhali Government Women's College		Noakhali
Noakhali Science and Commerce School and College		Noakhali
Notre Dame College, Mymensingh		
P		
Pakundia Adarsha Mohila College		Kishoreganj
Patuakhali Government College		Patuakhali
Perdana College of Malaysia		
Police Lines School and College		
Polli Sree College		
R		
Rahmat Iqbal College		
Rajshahi College		Rajshahi
RAJUK Uttara Model College		Dhaka
Rangpur Government College		Rangpur
Rangpur Engineering College		Rangpur
Rangpur Public School And College		Rangpur
Rangunia College		Rangpur
Raozan Government University College		
Royal Media College		
S		
Satkania Government College		Chittagong
Shaheed Ramiz Uddin Cantonment College		Dhaka Cantonment
Safiuddin Sarker Academy and College		
Saidpur College		Nilphamari
Sapahar Government College		
Shyamoli Textile Engineering College		Dhaka
Barishal Textile Engineering College		
Shahidul Chowdhury Engineering College		
Shahid A.H.M. Kamaruzzaman Govt. Degree College		
Shahid Buddhijibi Government College	1965	Rajshahi
Shahid Syed Nazrul Islam College		
Shaikh Burhanuddin Post Graduate College		Dhaka
Sherpur Government College	1964	Sherpur
Sonapur Degree College		
SOS Hermann Gmeiner College		
Sylhet Cadet College		Sylhet
Sylhet Engineering College		Sylhet
Sylhet Government Women's College		Sylhet
Sristy Academic school/ Sristy College of Tangail		Tangail
Sylhet Science And Technology College		Sylhet
T		
Tangail Polytechnic Institute		Tangail
Tejgaon College		Dhaka
Tejgaon Mohila College		Dhaka
Tetulia B. M. C. College		
Textile Engineering College, Chittagong		Chittagong
Thakurgaon Government College		
U		
Ullapara Science College		Sirajganj
United College of Aviation, Science & Management		
University Laboratory School and College		
Uttar Kattoli Alhaz Mostafa Hakim University College		
Uttara Town College		Dhaka

== Specialized Colleges ==
=== Specialized Engineering Colleges ===
- Affiliated with DU
  - Mymensingh Engineering College
  - Faridpur Engineering College
  - Barishal Engineering College
- Affiliated with SUST
  - Sylhet Engineering College
- Affiliated with RU
  - Rangpur Engineering College

=== Specialized Science and Technology Colleges ===
- Affiliated with BUP
  - Military Institute of Science and Technology
- Affiliated with HSTU
  - Shahid Akbar Ali Science & Technology College

=== Specialized Textile Engineering Colleges ===
- Affiliated with Bangladesh Textile University.
  - Textile Engineering College, Chittagong
  - Pabna Textile Engineering College
  - Textile Engineering College, Noakhali
  - Barishal Textile Engineering College
  - Jhenaidah Textile Engineering College
  - Rangpur Textile Engineering College
  - Gopalganj Textile Engineering College
  - Jamalpur Textile Engineering College
  - Tangail Textile Engineering College

== Public University Affiliate Colleges ==
=== Specialized Public Science & Technology Colleges ===
Colleges	Acronym	Founded	Affiliation	Location	Division	Specialization	Ph.D. granting	Website
Military Institute of Science and Technology.	MIST	1998	BUP	Dhaka	Dhaka Division	STEM	No	link

=== Specialized Public Engineering Colleges ===
Colleges	Acronym	Founded	Affiliation	Location	Division	Specialization	Ph.D. granting	Website
Sylhet Engineering College.	SEC	2008	SUST	Sylhet	Sylhet Division	Engineering	No	link
Mymensingh Engineering College.	MEC	2009	DU	Mymensingh	Mymensign Division	Engineering	No	link
Faridpur Engineering College.	FEC	2014	DU	Faridpur	Dhaka Division	Engineering	No	link
Barishal Engineering College.	BEC	2018	DU	Barisal	Barisal Division	Engineering	No	link

=== Specialized Public (BSc. in Textile) Engineering Colleges ===
Colleges	Acronym	Founded	Affiliation	Location	Division	Specialization	Ph.D. granting	Website
Textile Engineering College, Chittagong.	CTEC	2006	BUTEX	Zorarganj, Mirsharai Upazila, Chittagong	Chittagong Division	Textile Engineering	No	link
Pabna Textile Engineering College .	PTEC	2006	BUTEX	Pabna	Rajshahi Division	Textile Engineering	No	link
Textile Engineering College, Noakhali.	TECN	2007	BUTEX	Begumganj Upazila, Noakhali District	Chittagong Division	Textile Engineering	No	link
Barishal Textile Engineering College.	BTEC	2010	BUTEX	Barisal	Barisal Division	Textile Engineering	No	link
Jhenaidah Textile Engineering College.	JTEC	2016	BUTEX	Jhenaidah	Khulna Division	Textile Engineering	No	link
Rangpur Textile Engineering College.	RTEC	2018	BUTEX	Tukuriya, Pirganj Upazila, Rangpur	Rangpur Division	Textile Engineering	No	link
Gopalganj Textile Engineering College.	GTEC	2021	BUTEX	Gopalgang, Dhaka	Dhaka Division	Textile Engineering	No	link
Jamalpur Textile Engineering College.	JTEC	2022	BUTEX	Bhabki Bazar, Melandaha Upazila, Jamalpur District	Mymensigh Division	Textile Engineering	No	[link]

=== Public Medical Colleges ===
No.	Public Medical college	Acronym	Affiliated University	Hospital established	College Started	Enroll.	Location	Division	Website
1.	Dhaka Medical College	DMC	DU	1946	1946	250	Dhaka	Dhaka Division	link 1 link 2
2.	Sir Salimullah Medical College	SSMC	DU	1875	1972	250	Dhaka	Dhaka Division	link
3.	Shaheed Suhrawardy Medical College	ShSMC	DU	2006	2006	230	Dhaka	Dhaka Division	link
4.	Mymensingh Medical College	MMC	DU	1924	1962	250	Mymensingh	Mymensingh Division	link
5.	Chittagong Medical College	CMC	CMU	1927	1957	250	Chittagong	Chittagong Division	link
6.	Rajshahi Medical College	RMC	RMU	1954	1958	250	Rajshahi	Rajshahi Division	link
7.	Sylhet MAG Osmani Medical College	SOMC	SMU	1936	1962	250	Sylhet	Sylhet Division	link
8.	Sher-e-Bangla Medical College	SBMC	DU	1964	1968	250	Barisal	Barisal Division	link
9.	Rangpur Medical College	RpMC	RMU	1970	1970	250	Rangpura	Rangpur Division	link
10.	Comilla Medical College	CuMC	CMU	1979	1992	200	Comilla	Chittagong Division	link
11.	Khulna Medical College	KMC	KMU	1992	1992	200	Khulna	Khulna Division	link
12.	Shaheed Ziaur Rahman Medical College	SZMC	RMU	1992	1992	200	Bogra	Rajshahi Division	link
13.	Faridpur Medical College	FMC	DU	1992	1992	200	Faridpur	Dhaka Division	link
14.	Dinajpur Medical College	DjMC	RMU	1992	1992	200	Dinajpur	Rangpur Division	link
15.	Pabna Medical College	PMC	RMU	2008	2008	100	Pabna	Rajshahi Division	link
16.	Noakhali Medical College	NMC	CMU	2008	2008	100	Noakhali	Chittagong Division	
17.	Cox's Bazar Medical College	CoxMC	CMU	2008	2008	100	Cox's Bazar	Chittagong Division	link
18.	Jashore Medical College	JMC	KMU	2010	2010	100	Jessore	Khulna Division	link
19.	Satkhira Medical College	SMC	KMU	2011	2011	100	Satkhira	Khulna Division	link
20.	Shahid Syed Nazrul Islam Medical College	SSNIMC	DU	2011	2011	100	Kishoreganj	Dhaka Division	link
21.	Kushtia Medical College	KuMC	RMU	2011	2011	100	Kushtia	Khulna Division	link
22.	Gopalganj Medical College	GMC	DU	2011	2011	125	Gopalganj	Dhaka Division	link
23.	Shaheed Tajuddin Ahmad Medical College	STAMC	DU	2013	2013	100	Gazipur	Dhaka Division	link
24.	Tangail Medical College, Tangail	TMC	DU	2014	2014	100	Tangail	Dhaka Division	link
25.	Jamalpur Medical College, Jamalpur	JaMC	DU	2014	2014	100	Jamalpur	Mymensingh Division	link
26.	Manikganj Medical College	MaMC	DU	2014	2014	125	Manikganj	Dhaka Division	link
27.	Sirajganj Medical College	SMC	RMU	2014	2014	100	Sirajganj	Rajshahi Division	link
28.	Patuakhali Medical College	PkMC	DU	2014	2014	75	Patuakhali	Barisal Division	link
29.	Rangamati Medical College	RmMC	CMU	2014	2014	75	Rangamati	Chittagong Division	link
30.	Mugda Medical College	MuMC	DU	2015	2016	100	Dhaka	Dhaka Division	link
31.	Habiganj Medical College, Habiganj]]	HMC	SMU	2018	2018	100	Habiganj	Sylhet Division	link
32.	Netrokona Medical College, Netrokona	NMC	DU	2018	2018	75	Netrokona	Mymensingh Division	link
33.	Nilphamari Medical College	NpMC	RMU	2018	2018	75	Nilphamari	Rangpur Division	link
34.	Magura Medical College	MaMC	KMU	2018	2018	75	Magura	Khulna Division	link
35.	Naogaon Medical College	NaMC	RMU	2018	2018	75	Naogaon	Rajshahi Division	link
36.	Chandpur Medical College	ChMC	CMU	2018	2018	75	Chandpur	Chittagong Division	link
37.	Sunamganj Medical College	SuMC	SMU	2020	2021	75	Sunamganj	Sylhet Division	link

=== Specialized Public Dental Colleges ===
No.	Dental college	Acronym	Affiliated University	Established	College started	Enroll.	Location	Division	Website
1.	Dhaka Dental College	DDC	DU	1961	1961	97	Dhaka	Dhaka Division	Link
2.	Chittagong Medical College Dental Unit	CMC	CMU	1990	1990	60	Chittagong	Chittagong Division	link
3.	Rajshahi Medical College Dental Unit	RMC	RMU	1989	1989	59	Rajshahi	Rajshahi Division	link
4.	Sir Salimullah Medical College Dental Unit	SSMC	DU	2011	2011	56	Dhaka	Dhaka Division	link
5.	Shaheed Suhrawardy Medical College Dental Unit	SShMC	DU	2011	2011	52	Dhaka	Dhaka Division	link
6.	Mymensingh Medical College Dental Unit	MMC	DU	2011	2011	52	Mymensingh	Dhaka Division	link
7.	MAG Osmani Medical College Dental Unit	SOMC	SMU	2011	2011	52	Sylhet	Sylhet Division	link
8.	Sher-e-Bangla Medical College Dental Unit	SBMC	DU	2011	2011	52	Barisal	Barisal Division	link
9.	Rangpur Medical College Dental Unit	RpMC	RMU	2011	2011	52	Rangpur	Rangpur Division	link

== See also ==
- Education in Bangladesh
- List of schools in Bangladesh
- List of zilla schools of Bangladesh
- List of English-medium schools in Bangladesh
- List of Qawmi Madrasas in Bangladesh
- List of institutes in Bangladesh
- List of cadet colleges in Bangladesh
- List of medical colleges in Bangladesh
- List of dental schools in Bangladesh
- Textile schools in Bangladesh
- List of architecture schools in Bangladesh
- List of universities in Bangladesh
- University Grants Commission (Bangladesh)
- List of Intermediate and Secondary Education Boards in Bangladesh
- Bangladesh Madrasah Education Board
- Bangladesh Technical Education Board
