= List of universities and schools in Mymensingh =

Mymensingh is known as City of Education. Several reputed educational institutes of the country are located in this city.Here is a list of the educational institutions of Mymensingh city, Bangladesh. The number registered has increased since the 1990s in proportion with the rising population.

== Universities and colleges ==
- Bangladesh Agricultural University
- Jatiya Kabi Kazi Nazrul Islam University
- Mymensingh Medical College
- Govt. Muminunnesa Women's College
- Agricultural University College, Mymensingh
- Mymensingh Girls' Cadet College
- Community Based Medical College, Mymensingh
- Ananda Mohan College
- Mymensingh University of Engineering and Technology (Proposed)
- Bongobondhu Cultural University, Mymensingh (Proposed)
- Mymensingh Women Polytechnic Institute
- Nasirabad College, Mymensingh
- Alamgir Monsur (Mintu) Memorial College, Mymensingh
- Notre Dame College, Mymensingh
- Mymensingh Engineering College
- College of Business Science & Technology (CBST)
- Border Guard School ang College, Mymensingh
- State Institute
- Mymensingh Nursing College
- Collectorate School and College
- Teachers Training College (TTC)
- Woman Teachers Training College
- Mymensingh Polytechnic Institute(MPI)
- Rumdo Institute of Modern Technology
- Nasirabad University College
- Cantonment Public School & College
- Mymensingh Govt. College
- Advanced Residential Model College
- Brahmaputra Residential Model College
- Shahid Syed Nazrul Islam College
- Mymensingh Islami Academi & College
- Prime Central College
- Mymensingh Mohila (Degree) College
- Mymensingh College/ Mohabiddaloy
- Shambhugonj GKP College, Mymensingh
- Mymensingh Commerce College
- Advanced Residential Model College
- Royal Media College
- Haji Kashem ali College
- Muslim Girls High School and College
- Momenshahi Law College
- National Public College
- Florence Boys College
- Bir Muktijodda Principal Motiur Rahman Academy (School & College)
- Home Economics College
- Mymensingh Textile Engineering Institute
- Momenshahi Technical College, Mymensingh
- Skabo Textile Engineering & Polytechnic Institute, Mymensingh
- Mymensingh Ideal College
- Mymensingh City College
- Eden Girls College, Mymensingh
- Mohakali Girls School and College
- Government Physical Education College, Mymensingh
- Shahabuddin Degree College
- Begum Fazilatunnecha Mujib Government Mohila College
- Mymensingh Institute Science and Technology
- Government Nazrul College, Trishal Mymensingh
- Ishwarganj Govt. College

== Schools ==
School name	School name
Mymensingh Zilla School	Vidyamoyee Uccha Balika Bidyalaya
Govt. Laboratory High School	Muslim Girls' High School
Cantonment Public School & College	Nasirabad Girls' High School
K.B. High School	Kumer Upendra Bidyapith
Mukul Niketon School	Cantonment Board High School
Mymensingh Laboratory High School, Mymensingh	Bangladesh Railway Govt. High School
Police Line High School	Preparatory High school
Nazrul Sena School	Muslim High School
Model Kinder Garten, Golgonda, Mymensingh	Premier Ideal High School
Mrittunjoy School	Nasirabad Collegiate School
Onnesha International School & College	Radhasundari Uccha Balika Bidyalaya
Uduyan High School	Mymensingh High School
Gohailkandi High School	Kewatkhaly High School
Sunflower Pre-cadet High School	Zilla Parishad High School
Millennium International School	Edward Institution
Beg International School	R.k High school
Mohakali Pathshala O Uccha Bidyala	Progressive Model School
Advanced Model School	Prime International School, Mymensingh
Shishu Niketon School	Notun Kuri Nursery School
Shambhuganj U.C. High School	Amlitola High School
Nabarun Bidya Niketon	Mukh-bodhir School
Nazirabad High School, Churkhai Bazar	City collegiate School
Mohakali school	Sadar Upozila Millennium Junior School
Mymensingh International School(MIS)	Wisdom International School & College

== Education research ==
- National Academy for Primary Teachers' Education (NAPE)
- Bangladesh Institute of Nuclear Agriculture (BINA)
- Bangladesh Fisheries Research Institute
- The Institute of Radiation Genetics and Plant Breeding
- Veterinary Training Institute, Mymensingh
