= List of dental schools in Bangladesh =

In Bangladesh, dental schools are well known as Dental colleges or Dental units. Like medical education, dental education are conducted by different dental colleges located all over the country. These dental colleges are affiliated with medical faculties of different government-funded public universities. These dental colleges conduct an undergraduate course known as Bachelor of Dental Surgery (BDS). Each dental college is affiliated with a specific medical faculty of a university. The university conducts and monitors their professional examination, education system, syllabus, academic activity and finally awarded the Bachelor of Dental Surgery (BDS) degree. The dental college students also have to do an internship training program in these dental colleges to get the practicing permission in the country. After successfully finishing the internship training in any of the dental colleges, final dental practicing license or registration certificate is awarded by Bangladesh Medical and Dental Council. Bangladesh Medical and Dental Council also acts as a motoring and regulatory body to monitor, assess, evaluate, and permit the practice license of these dental schools graduate along with respective university.

The four universities that have dentistry in their medical faculties are the University of Dhaka, Chittagong Medical University, Rajshahi Medical University and Sylhet Medical University. These four public universities have their medical faculties affiliated with dental colleges and hospitals; those may be publicly or privately funded.

== Public Dental Colleges ==
No.	Dental college	Acronym	Affiliated University	Established	College started	Enroll.	Location	Division	Website
1.	Dhaka Dental College	DDC	DU	1961	1961	110	Dhaka	Dhaka Division	Link
2.	Chittagong Medical College Dental Unit	CMC	CMU	1990	1990	60	Chittagong	Chittagong Division	link
3.	Rajshahi Medical College Dental Unit	RMC	RMU	1989	1989	59	Rajshahi	Rajshahi Division	link
4.	Sir Salimullah Medical College Dental Unit	SSMC	DU	2011	2011	52	Dhaka	Dhaka Division	link
5.	Shaheed Suhrawardy Medical College Dental Unit	SShMC	DU	2011	2011	56	Dhaka	Dhaka Division	link
6.	Mymensingh Medical College Dental Unit	MMC	DU	2011	2011	52	Mymensingh	Mymensingh Division	link
7.	MAG Osmani Medical College Dental Unit	SOMC	SMU	2011	2011	52	Sylhet	Sylhet Division	link
8.	Sher-e-Bangla Medical College Dental Unit	SBMC	DU	2011	2011	52	Barisal	Barisal Division	link
9.	Rangpur Medical College Dental Unit	RpMC	RMU	2011	2011	52	Rangpur	Rangpur Division	link

== Private dental colleges ==
No.	Dental college	Acronym	Affiliated University	Established	College started	Location	Division	Website
1	Update Dental College	UpDC	DU	2008	2008	Dhaka	Dhaka division	link
2	TMSS Medical College Dental Unit	TMCDU	RMU	2008	2012	Bogra	Rajshahi Division	link
3	University Dental College	UDC	DU	1995	1995	Dhaka	Dhaka division	Link
4	Pioneer Dental College	PDC	DU	1995	1995	Dhaka	Dhaka division	link
5	Chattagram International Dental College	CIDC	CMU	2003	2003	Chittagong	Chittagong division	link
6	Sapporo Dental College	SDC	DU	1993	2000	Dhaka	Dhaka division	link
7	City Dental College	CDC	DU	1996	1996	Dhaka	Dhaka division	link
8	Rangpur Dental College	RDC	RMU	2001	2001	Rangpur	Rangpur Division	link
9	Bangladesh Dental College	BDC	DU	1986	1996	Dhaka	Dhaka division	link
10	Marks Medical College, Dental unit	MDC	DU	2008	2008	Dhaka	Dhaka division	link
11	Saphena Women's Dental College	SWDC	DU	2010	2010	Dhaka	Dhaka division	link
12	Mandy Dental College	MDC	DU	2008	2008	Dhaka	Dhaka division	link
13	Udayan Dental College	UdDC	RMU	2008	2009	Rajshahi	Rajshahi Division	link
14	MH Samorita Medical College & Dental Unit	MHSMCDU	DU	2010	2010	Dhaka	Dhaka division	link
15	Kumudini Women's Medical College, Dental Unit	KWMCDU	DU	2011	2001	Tangail	Dhaka division	link
16	Holy Family Red Cresect Medical College Dental Unit	HFRCMCDU	DU	2013	2013	Dhaka	Dhaka division	link
17	Gonoshasthaya Samajvittik Medical College,Dental unit	GSVMCDU	DU	1998	1998	Savar	Dhaka division	link
18	Ibrahim Medical College, Dental Unit	IMCDU	DU	2015	2015	Dhaka	Dhaka Division	link
19	Dhaka Community Medical College,Dental Unit	DCMCDU	DU	2013	2013	Dhaka	Dhaka Division	link
20	Dhaka National Medical College Dental Unit	DNMCDU	DU	1925	1994	Dhaka	Dhaka division	link
21	Islami Bank Medical College Dental Unit	IBMCDU	RMU	2003	2003	Rajshahi	Rajshahi Division	link
22	Sylhet Central Dental College	SCDC	SMU	2016	2016	Sylhet	Sylhet Division	link
23	Khawja Eunus Ali Medical College Dental Unit	KEAMCDU	RMU	2005	2005	Enayetpur	Rajshahi Division	link
24	North East Medical College Dental Unit	NEMCDU	SMU	1997	1997	Sylhet	Sylhet division	link

== See also ==
- List of medical schools in Bangladesh
- Bangladesh Medical and Dental Council
- Education in Bangladesh
- List of universities in Bangladesh
- List of schools in Bangladesh
- List of colleges in Bangladesh
- List of institutes in Bangladesh
- List of medical colleges in Bangladesh
- Textile schools in Bangladesh
- List of architecture schools in Bangladesh
- List of dental schools in Bangladesh
- University Grants Commission (Bangladesh)
