= SSTC =

SSTC may refer to:

- Security Services Technical Committee; see Security Assertion Markup Language § History
- Shri Shankaracharya Technical Campus, Bhilai, Chhattisgarh, India
- Solid state Tesla coil, a Tesla coil that uses semiconductors in place of the traditional spark gap
- Silver Strand Training Complex, near San Diego, California, U.S.
- Starship Troopers Chronicles, a CGI animated television series
- State Science and Technology Commission, a ministry of the People's Republic of China
- Sylhet Science And Technology College, Sylhet, Bangladesh
