= Faridpur Engineering College =

Public Engineering College in Bangladesh

Faridpur Engineering College (FEC)
- ফরিদপুর প্রকৌশল মহাবিদ্যালয়
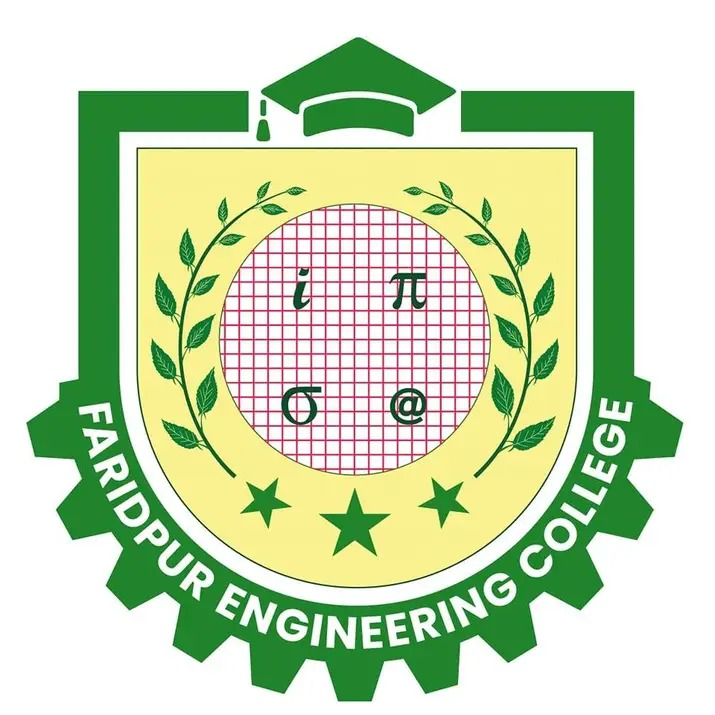
- Logo of Faridpur Engineering College (FEC)
- Type: Public Engineering College
- Established: 2010; 16 years ago
- Academic affiliations: Faculty of Engineering and Technology, University of Dhaka
- Principal: Prof. Md. Alamgir Hossain
- Location: Faridpur, Bangladesh; 23.5970°N 89.8546°E
- Campus: Suburb, 2.0 hectares (5 acres)
- Language: Medium Of Instruction is English
- Website: https://www.fec.ac.bd/

Faridpur Engineering College (FEC) is a public undergraduate college in Faridpur, Bangladesh. It was established in 2010. The college is just 2.7 km away from Faridpur city Located at Dr. Kazi Motaher Hossain Road, Char Kamalapur, Baitul Aman, Faridpur. The academic activities of the college are managed under the Faculty of Engineering and Technology of University of Dhaka and the administrative activities under the Directorate of Technical Education. Every year, around 180 students get accepted to undergraduate programs in Electrical and Electronic Engineering (EEE), Civil Engineering (CE) and Computer Science and Engineering (CSE).

== History ==
Construction of the Education Engineering Department began in 2005, financed by the government of Bangladesh. The main work was completed in 2010, while the electricity and water connections were finished in 2013.

== Campus ==
All departments are housed in a multi-story building on a campus of approximately 5 acres. Its 10 buildings include an administrative building, three faculty buildings, a cafeteria, a bank, a post office, a library and an auditorium. Three residence halls provide student accommodation, one for women and two for men.

| Name of the hall | Capacity |
|---|---|
| South Hall | 160 |
| North Hall / Palli Kabi Jasimuddin Hall | 160 |
| Female Hall | 96 |

== Academics ==
=== Affiliation ===
Faridpur Engineering College is affiliated with University of Dhaka under the Faculty of Engineering & Technology. The University of Dhaka oversees FEC's admissions process.Admission Test

=== Departments ===
| Serial | Program | Spaces |
|---|---|---|
| 1 | B.Sc. in Electrical & Electronic Engineering | 61 |
| 2 | B.Sc. in Civil Engineering | 61 |
| 3 | B.Sc. in Computer Science and Engineering | 61 |

== Lab facilities ==
=== Department of Electrical and Electronic Engineering (EEE) ===
1. Electronics Lab
2. Electrical Circuit Lab
3. Electrical Machine Lab
4. Power System & High voltage Lab
5. Digital Signal Processing Lab
6. Structural Machine Lab

=== Department of Computer Science and Engineering(CSE) ===
1. Networking Lab
2. Communication & Microprocessor Lab
3. Central Computer Center Lab
4. Computer Lab
5. Microprocessor Lab
6. Software Lab
7. ACM Lab
8. Digital Logic Design Lab
9. ATTS Lab

=== Department of Civil Engineering (CE) ===
1. Transportation Lab
2. Drawing Lab
3. Hydraulics Lab
4. Environment Lab
5. Geo-Technical Lab
6. Physics Lab
7. Chemistry Lab
8. Machine Shop
9. Welding Shop
10. Surveying Shop
11. Foundry Shop
12. Wood Shop
13. Language Lab
14. AutoCAD Lab
15. Structural Engineering Lab

== Scholarships opportunities ==
Each semester, the government of Bangladesh awards scholarships of 1,950 BDT per student based on his/her CGPA (Top 50% per batch or department with the majority 50% female quota). After graduation, students receive further opportunities to study abroad through scholarships awarded according to the University of Dhaka's merit list.

== Associations and clubs ==
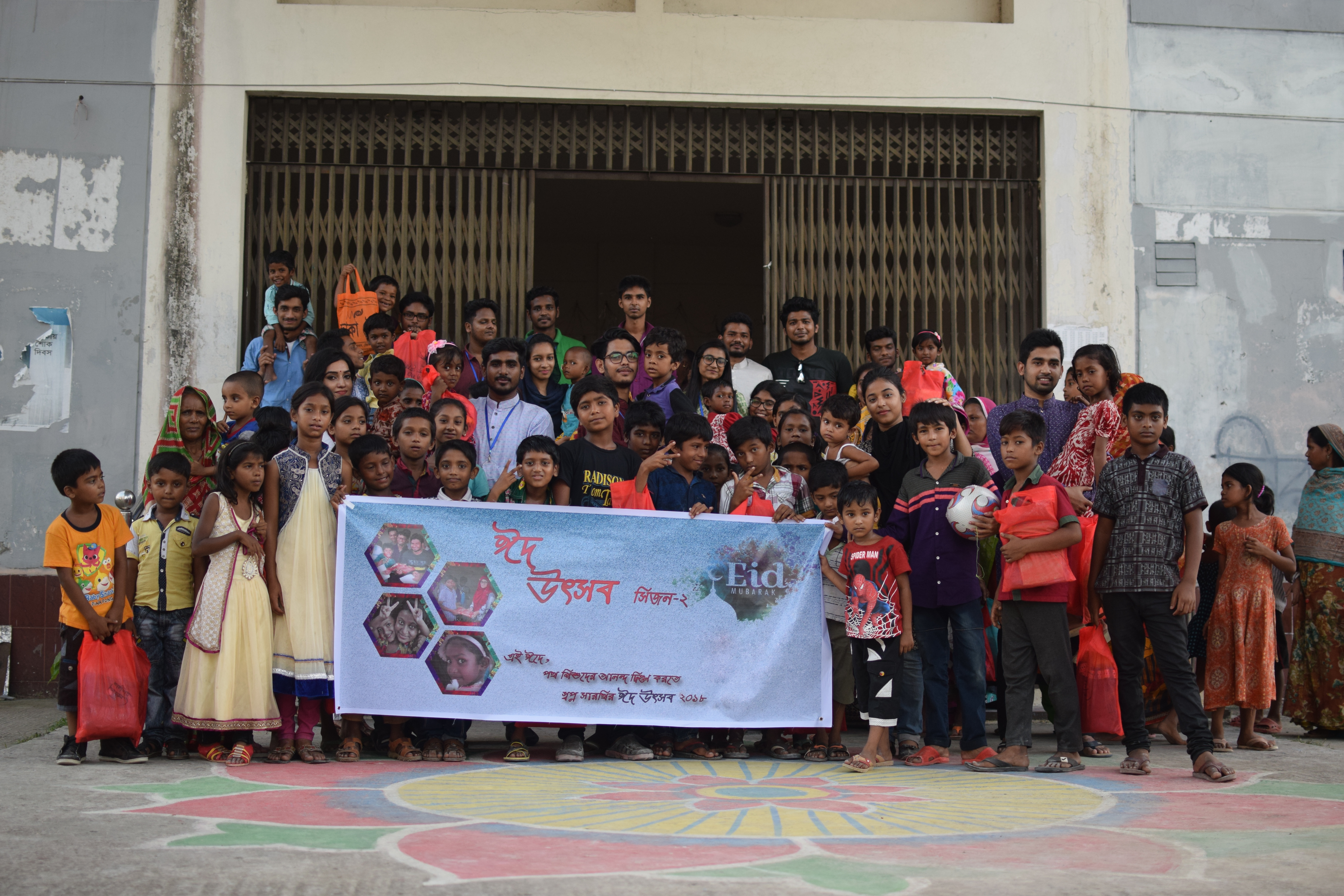
Swopno sarothi event at FEC

- FECIRDC - Faridpur Engineering College Islamic Research & Dawah Centre
- FECPC - Faridpur Engineering College Programming Club
- RIC - Research and Innovation Centre
- FECCOP- Faridpur Engineering College Club of Professionals
- FECRSG - Faridpur Engineering College Rover Scout Group
- FECSA - Faridpur Engineering College Sports Association
- Swopno Sarothi Foundation
- FECLC- Faridpur Engineering College Language Club
- FECJPC - Faridpur Engineering College Job Placement Cell
- FECDA- Faridpur Engineering College Debating Association
- FECBAC - Faridpur Engineering College Bani Arrchana Committee
- FECSDC - Faridpur Engineering College Software Development Club

== See also ==
- Mymensingh Engineering College
- Sylhet Engineering College
- Barisal Engineering College
