= MMSC =

MMSC may refer to:

- Government Mohammadpur Model School & College, Dhaka, Bangladesh
- Mamdee Mollah School & College, Gazipur, Bangladesh
- Madras Motor Sports Club, an auto racing club in Chennai, India
- Master of Medical Science, an academic degree
- Methylmethionine sulfonium chloride
- Multimedia Messaging Service
- Multi-Mission Surface Combatant, an export variant of the Freedom-class littoral combat ship
