= Central Road =

Road in Kalabagan, Dhaka

- Type: Street
- Maintained by: Dhaka South City Corporation
- Location: Dhaka
- Postal code: 1205
- West end: Green Road
- Major junctions: Hatirpool Intersection
- East end: Bir Uttam CR Dutta Road (Sonargaon Road), Hatirpool Intersection, and Paribagh
- North: Kalabagan-Kathalbagan
- East: Hatirpool, Paribagh, Shahbagh, Ramna
- South: New Market, Katabon
- West: Dhanmondi, Kalabagan

Central Road is an east-west road in Kalabagan, Dhaka, Bangladesh. It is located between the Hatirpool Intersection at Sonargaon Road (renamed to Bir Uttam CR Dutta Road) and Green Road, and is close to the Science Laboratory intersection running parallel to New Elephant Road.

== Geography and administration ==
The road is administrated by Dhaka South City Corporation, and falls under Kalabagan Thana. The street is also close to Dhanmondi, which lies to its west, Shahbagh to its east, Kathalbagan-Kalabagan to the north and Katabon and New Market to its south.

== History ==
In 2004, the street was broadened by the local commissioner with the cooperation of the residents of the dense neighbourhood.

== Notable institutions ==
- Ideal College
