= Ideal College =

Private college in Dhaka, Bangladesh

- আইডিয়াল কলেজ
- Type: Private college
- Established: 1969
- Chairman: Prof. Dr. SM Mostafa Al Mamun
- Principal: Dr. Khandaker Mohammad Sohel
- Academic staff: 114
- Location: 65 Central Road, Hatirpool, Dhaka, 1205, Bangladesh
- Campus: Urban
- Language: Bengali medium
- EIIN: 107971
- Colors: White, Black and Sky

Ideal College (Bengali: আইডিয়াল কলেজ) is a private college in Central Road, Dhaka, Bangladesh. It opened in 1969.

It offers higher secondary education in science, commerce and humanities, and undergraduate-level education under the National University, Bangladesh.

The college has eighteen departments, eighty-three teachers and around sixty administrative staffs. In H.S.C. level including first and second year, there are about four thousand students studying science, arts and commerce.

In 2025 and 2026, students at the college fought in the streets with pupils of Dhaka College and Dhaka City College, causing problems for traffic in the city. The colleges came to a "peace agreement" in 2025, but clashed again after that and in 2026.

== See also ==
- List of colleges in Bangladesh
- List of universities in Bangladesh
- Education in Bangladesh
