= Atomic Energy Research Establishment School and College =

College in Savar Upazila, Dhaka, Bangladesh

A E R E School & College

Location
- Ganakbari, Savar Upazila; 1349; Bangladesh
- Coordinates: 23.9625°N 90.28272°E

Information
- Type: School & College
- Established: 1983
- School code: 1553
- Principal: Sudhangshu Shekhor Roy
- Enrollment: 1,650
- Language: Bengali
- Website: aeresc.edu.bd

Atomic Energy Research Establishment School & College, former name: AERE High School (Bengali: পরমাণু শক্তি গবেষণা প্রতিষ্ঠান স্কুল এন্ড কলেজ), is a school in Savar Upazila, Dhaka, Bangladesh.

== History ==
It was established as a high school for the children of employees residing at Atomic Energy Research Establishment (AERE) campus and also the children from surrounding areas in 1983. After 2008, it has been enlarged as a college which has been named as Atomic Energy Research Establishment School and College. It is a part of AERE, under Bangladesh Atomic Energy Commission. It is maintained by a governing body headed by the DG of AERE. Now, there are more than 1,600 students in various classes, some 37 teachers and 13 office staff at the institution.
