= HSC distinction courses =

Australian educational program

Distinction courses were an advanced placement program (not to be confused with the US Advanced Placement program) available to Higher School Certificate (HSC) students in New South Wales, Australia, who have been accelerated in at least one subject by at least one year. For the bulk of the program, three courses were available, Comparative literature, Cosmology, and Philosophy, and are run via distance education and directly administered by the NSW Board of Studies. The programs were no longer run after the 2010 HSC.

== Entrance requirements ==
To be eligible to apply, students must first be accelerated in at least one subject, typically at the highest offered level, at least one year in advance. Although the student must complete at least one subject to be eligible, there is no subject pre-requisite for the program and students who apply are free to choose any one of the three available courses. Students complete an application form documenting academic success and require a recommendation from their school principal. An independent panel reviews each application in late-December, in light of the student's performance in their accelerated subject/s, where they must typically achieve a mark 75% or higher.

== Recognition ==
=== HSC and UAI ===
Each Distinction Course is worth 2 units of credit and can contribute toward the student's final UAI providing their performance in the course places it in their top 10 units. However, the course does not contribute toward the student's minimum 10 units required to be awarded the HSC and must be in addition to their base units. This is generally not a problem as students in the program on average complete 16 units of credit by the time they are awarded their HSC, compared to the state average of 11 units.

=== Tertiary ===
Most major universities in NSW also recognise the program for advanced standing in some form or another, typically relaxing pre-requisite requirements for higher level courses, while some even offer direct credit toward the student's tertiary program. Recognition however is not consistent and often varies from year to year and even student to student, and is seen as one of the major limitations of the program.

=== Complications for the UAI ===
While Distinction Courses generally scale very well in their contribution to the UAI, there are two main complications in the way it is calculated that can work against individual students. Both of these issues originate in the small number of students sitting each individual course that makes it difficult to apply the same statistical models used for other subjects. In both cases if the student performs well across all their units, this is generally not an issue.

The first problem is that the UAI is a rank, comparing all students in a cohort to one another. Because accelerants complete their HSC over two or more years, their final UAI is calculated with scores achieved in a different cohort. While some allowance for this is made in the calculation both of the UAI generally (one of the improvements over the TER it replaced) and for accelerants in particular, scores for subjects in the student's final year generally carry more weight. Since an accelerant is unlikely to be accelerated in the first place unless the subject is their major strength, this carries less weight than it should.

Due to the small pool, the scaling factor for the Distinction courses is calculated not with just the student's marks in the program, but by taking all their marks in all their subjects. The second issue occurs when students who have realised only 10 units of credit are actually required to achieve both the HSC and a UAI, sometimes pick additional subjects for interest rather than to further their mark, and thus perform less well than they otherwise would have. This can pull down the student's individual ranking and thus count against them.

== Structure ==
Each of the three courses runs over the course of approximately nine months, commencing early January delivered via distance education mode. Students receive course materials, and work their way through a series of modules that are accessed via written assignments submitted via post. Students are required to attend a number of residential schools, typically held in Sydney with regional students receiving assistance when required to be able to attend.

In addition each course has one or more exams, delivered by their school under HSC exam conditions either during the formal HSC period or at other times during the year. Any clashes with school events or commitments are resolved in favour of the program, schools being required to move activities, exams, etc. and make allowances for students, to fit around the prescribed exam time. This ensures all students sit the same exam at the same time across the state.

Students interact with each other during the year primarily through the program's website which provides forums, materials and other support mechanisms. While not available at the program's inception in 1991, this technology was adopted very early on thanks to the contribution of the program's academics and the universities themselves who had similar early adoption in their own distance education facilities. Students also gain access to libraries and are able to contact each other as well as the program's coordinators and academics via email and phone.

== History ==
=== Origin ===
The program was originally conceptualised in 1991 at the direction of the then President of the Board Dr John Lambert following the relaxation of the requirement that all students in NSW had to attend a minimum number of primary and secondary years of schooling. Gifted and talented students who had previously been held in lock-step with their cohort were allowed to accelerate; although for a small portion of the population this involved whole-year grade advancement, a larger population typically accelerated in secondary school in just one (or more) subjects. This created a gap in the student's final year of schooling, which the Distinction Course program was designed to fill.

During the initial stages of development a total of nine courses were planned, all selected to fall outside existing curriculum areas to avoid overlap and any misalignment with existing subject progression arrangements. The program was to be offered via distance education mode at no cost to participants, providing equal access to students in rural or low SOE areas of NSW, running nominally at first year university level. The program designers included senior board staff, respected academics in the planned fields, gifted education experts including members of GERRIC.

The program was specifically targeted at gifted and talented students, requiring students to have not only accelerated by at least one year, but to do so at the highest level otherwise available and achieve a mark above 75%. The program's name is derived from this last requirement; the standard name given to a 75% or higher grade at tertiary level in NSW is 'Distinction'.

=== Pilot ===
Of the nine original courses, three were selected to be developed into full courses (Cosmology, Philosophy and Comparative Literature) as a three-year pilot program and were first offered in 1993. At the time the NSW HSC grouped subjects into Key Learning Areas (KLA) being English, KLA1 (maths, science, etc.) and KLA2 (humanities, creative arts, etc.); the selected courses allowed for one Distinction Course offered in each KLA.

One of the biggest stumbling blocks to getting the program started was lack of funding, as the program did not fall into traditional arrangements where the State is responsible for secondary schools and Federal tertiary. In an unusual move, the President of the Board organised for the Board to fund the pilot from its own budget, with the intention of resolving funding issues in time for the full program. The Distinction Course Monitoring Panel was established to oversee the program, while the actual delivery was outsourced to established distance education providers. Charles Sturt University (CSU) was contracted to deliver the Comparative Literature and Cosmology courses, and the University of New England (UNE) Philosophy

The first cohort of just 12 students successfully completed the program in 1993. Enrolments quickly grew as the program became established and more widely known, gradually increasing to its funding ceiling of 100 places in 1997.

=== McGaw Review ===
The 1994 NSW state election saw a transition from the Liberal to Labour party, which resulted in a number of changes including the dismissal of Dr John Lambert in 1994 and the 1996 McGaw review which eventually led to the curriculum overall called the “New HSC” in 2001. The McGaw review recommended the deletion of the Distinction Course program; although various public reasons were given, the primary problem was with the funding arrangement established by Dr Lambert.

The Board, a statutory policy and curriculum body, was not technically empowered to directly deliver courses, viewed as problematic at best a conflict of interest at worst. While the program had never been intended to be funded by the Board past its pilot, the full program had been shelved until the review process could be completed.

=== Status quo ===
One of the biggest flaws of the program was a lack of direct recognition by tertiary intuitions; although delivered by universities at a university level, the program was viewed by the bulk of universities in NSW as a secondary program and thus did not qualify for credit when the student started their tertiary education the following year. The McGaw review concluded that a program delivered directly by universities would resolve this problem, essentially allowing students to commence part of their degree while still completing their HSC under an Early Entrance scheme.

Lobbying by various parties eventually had the McGaw recommendation amended in 1997 to state that the existing program would be maintained until an appropriate replacement program could be established. This would allow students to be transitioned over to the new program without disadvantage in the interim.

Initial efforts by the Board to establish an Early Entry scheme stalled when it became apparent that neither the State or universities would foot the bill for the program, and it would be difficult to argue students who received free tuition under the current program should now be liable for HECS. Unable to deliver the proposed program in time for the 2001 New HSC, it was quietly shelved and an equilibrium was established where the status quo was maintained on a rolling year-by-year basis.

While funding was guaranteed for 100 places, this had to be renewed each year and without an official status the program was not reviewed, extended, updated or otherwise maintained beyond that required to maintain its 1997 form.

=== Withdrawal ===
The program continued to be offered on a “last year” basis until 2008 when a funding dispute between CSU and the Board saw the university's withdrawal from the 2009 program. Negotiations with UNE allowed it to pick up the administration of Cosmology, however Comparative Literature was cut by the Board. At the end of 2009 after a number of scheduling problems exacerbated by the gradual deterioration of the program the academics for Cosmology retired and the Board dropped it from the program in 2010. Philosophy, the last remaining course was offered by UNE in 2010, and the Board has indicated there will be no funding for 2011.

The events of 2008 saw a revival of the dormant Early Entry scheme, and the Board set in motion processes to establish the program. The 2007 election of the Labour party at Federal level, in addition to significant changes to the funding arrangements for tertiary institutions in Australia, the environment is now very different and it looks more likely that the scheme will succeed.

== More information ==
See the Distinction Course website for more information.
