= Gopaldi Nazrul Islam Babu College =

Private college in Bangladesh

Coordinates: 23.8016°N 90.7112°E

- গোপালদী নজরুল ইসলাম বাবু কলেজ
- Other names: GNIBC, Babu College
- Type: Private
- Established: 2010
- Founders: Nazrul Islam Babu and Sayema Islam Eva
- Chairman: Nazrul Islam Babu
- Principal: Alamgir Hasan
- Academic staff: 40+
- Students: 1000+
- Location: Gopaldi, Araihazar, Narayanganj, Bangladesh
- Campus: Urban
- Language: Bangla
- Colours: Aero and Black
- Website: GNIBC

Gopaldi Nazrul Islam Babu College is a private college and located in Gopaldi, Araihazar, Narayanganj. This college was founded in 2010 by the former M.P (Member of the Parliament, Narayanganj-2) Md. Nazrul Islam Babu. Therefore, the college was named after him. This institution is also known as GNIBC/Babu college by the local people.

== Departments ==
The college has been listed with three higher secondary department.

- Department of Science
- Department of Business Studies
- Department of Humanities

== History ==
Since its founding in 2010, Gopaldi Nazrul Islam Babu College is providing education to its intermediate students. This college was founded by the local M.P(former). Before the founding of GNIBC, all the local students of Gopaldi and other nearest villages had to travel a long distance to attend college.

== Accommodation and transportation ==
Accommodation for students from far away is available at Gopaldi Nazrul Islam Babu College which is directly managed under the college authority. Hostel buildings have modern structure with good interior and attached bathroom. Students can order different meal per day as he wants to eat. TV, daily newspaper, CCTV security system & security guards are available at hostel. Hostels are situated inside college campus. Currently 100 students are staying at college hostel.

A Transport department functions in the college with buses to provide transport facility to students and staff from various places.

== Location ==
Nazrul Islam Babu College(GNIBC) is situated at 90°42'east longitude and 23°48' north latitude in Gopaldi, Araihazar Upazila, Narayanganj District, in the capital of Dhaka.
