= Tejgaon Mohila College =

Coordinates: 23.755864°N 90.393123°E

- তেজগাঁও মহিলা কলেজ
- Logo of Tejgaon Mohila College
- Type: Public
- Established: 1972; 54 years ago
- Founders: Bangabondhu Sheikh Mujibur Rahman
- Affiliations: National University, Bangladesh
- Principal: Mohammad Nazrul Islam
- Location: Dhaka, Bangladesh
- Campus: Urban
- Website: tejgaonmohilacollege.org

Tejgaon Mohila College is a degree college for women situated in Farmgate, Dhaka, Bangladesh. It was established in 1972 by Bangabondhu Sheikh Mujibur Rahman. It is also a tutorial centre for Bangladesh Open University. Mohammad Nazrul Islam is the principal of the college and Mrs. Nasreen Akhter is the vice principal of the college.
