= Government Mohammadpur Model School & College =

Govt. Mohammadpur Model School & College
- সরকারি মোহাম্মদপুর মডেল স্কুল এন্ড কলেজ

Location
- Gaznabi Road; Mohammadpur Thana; Dhaka, 1207; Bangladesh; 23.7670°N 90.3680°E

Information
- Type: Public school & college
- Motto: শিক্ষা, শৃঙ্খলা, নৈতিকতা, দেশপ্রেম
- Established: 2004
- Principal: Professor Md. Nazrul Islam Khan
- Teaching staff: 105
- Grades: 3–12
- Gender: Boys and Girls
- Age range: 8–18
- Enrollment: 3,746 as of 1 February 2018
- Language: Bengali
- Campus size: 2.5 acres
- Campus type: Urban
- Sports: Football, cricket, basketball, volleyball, badminton
- EIIN number: 108264
- Office staff: 30
- Website: www.mmsc.edu.bd

Government Mohammadpur Model School & College (Bengali: সরকারি মোহাম্মদপুর মডেল স্কুল অ্যান্ড কলেজ) is a public co-educational institution (Class 3 to 12) located in Dhaka, Bangladesh. It has a capacity of 3,960 and over 3,500 students currently studying here.

== History ==
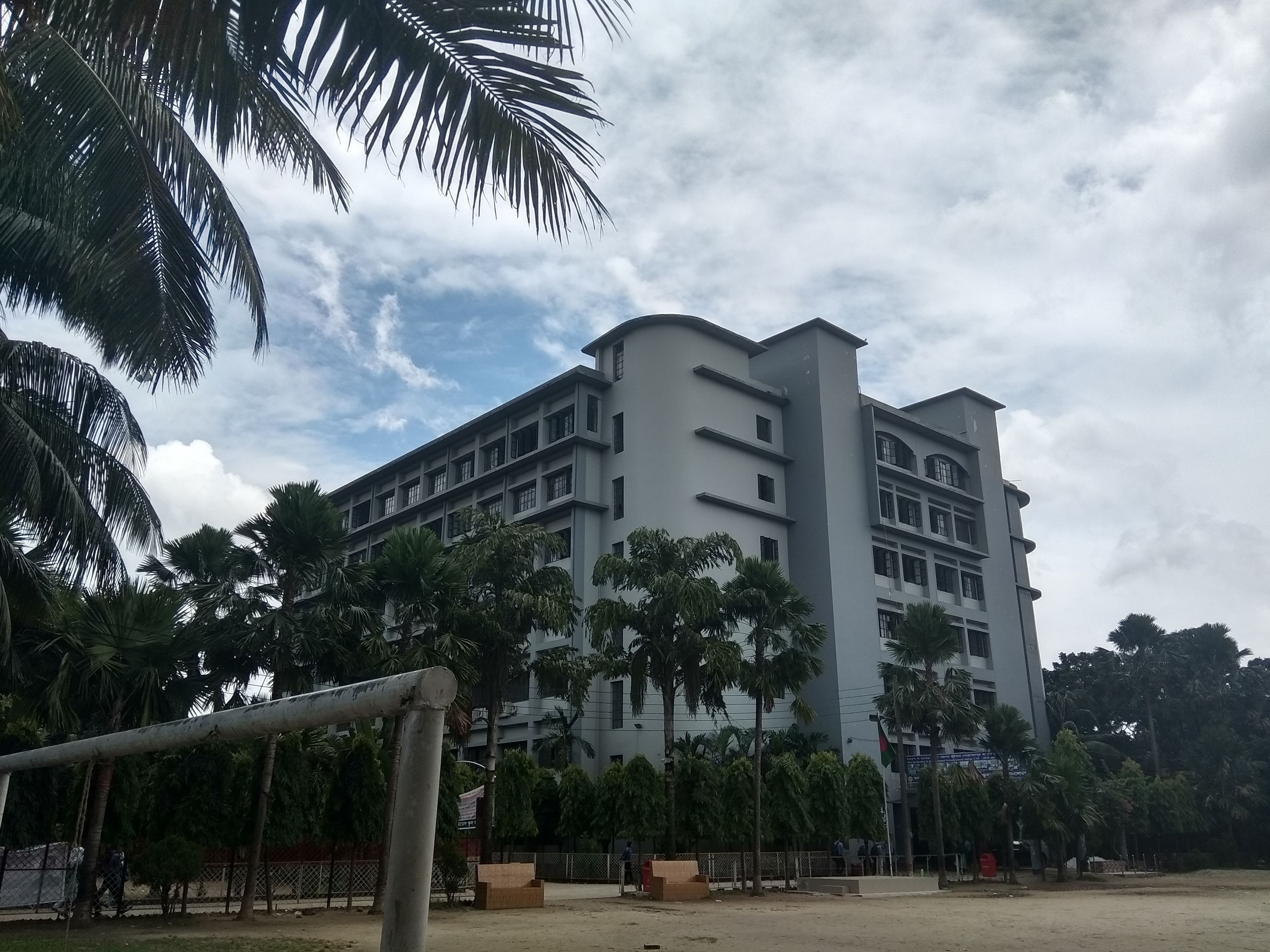
GMMSC Campus

Govt. Mohammadpur Model School & College is a co-education institution (Grade- III-XII) located at Gaznabi Road near College Gate Bus Stand, in the western side of Sher-E- Bangla Agricultural University and Shorawardi Medical College Hospital of Mirpur Road. This institution was established in 2004 by The Ministry of Education of the People's Republic of Bangladesh. It has two seven-storied buildings and another two with six stories each. It also has a computer lab and several respective laboratories for the science faculty. It has also two separate fields for boys and girls. A Baishkhi Mela is also held on the college premise.

== Students ==
The institution offers primary, secondary and higher secondary education for both boys and girls. Admission is based on an entrance test and a viva voce. Usually students may be admitted to the institution in the third, sixth, ninth or eleventh grade.

== Facilities ==
There are four seven-story buildings, a library, science labs and a computer lab, and separate sports fields for boys and girls. The campus is CCTV-protected; politics and smoking are forbidden.

== Extracurricular activities ==
Government Mohammadpur Model School & College holds annual sports and cultural programs and an extempore speech competition. Clubs include Science, Debate, Language, Scouting, BNCC and band etc.

== See also ==
- List of universities in Bangladesh
- List of Islamic educational institutions
- Bangladesh Technical Education Board
- List of colleges in Bangladesh
- Education in Bangladesh
