= Netrokona Medical College =

Government medical college in Bangladesh

- নেত্রকোনা মেডিকেল কলেজ
- Type: Government medical college
- Established: 2018
- Academic affiliations: Dhaka University
- Principal: Shyamal Kumar Paul
- Academic staff: 44
- Students: 232
- Location: Netrokona, Bangladesh; 24.8711°N 90.7326°E
- Campus: Urban
- Language: English

Netrokona Medical College is a government medical college in Netrokona, Bangladesh, founded in 2018 and affiliated with Dhaka University. The class of the first batch of 50 students was commenced on January 10, 2019 on its temporary campus of Netrokona Sadar Hospital.
