= Noakhali Science and Commerce School and College =

- নোয়াখালি সাইন্স এন্ড কমার্স স্কুল এন্ড কলেজ
- Maijdee, Noakhali; Bangladesh

Information
- Established: 2009
- Campus: Maijdee and Sonapur

Noakhali Science and Commerce School and College (NSCSC) was founded in 2009 by Aftab Uddin. NSCSC has two campuses: in Maijdee, and Sonapur.
