= Institute of Leather Engineering and Technology, University of Dhaka =

Research institute in Bangladesh

Coordinates: 23.7337°N 90.3688°E

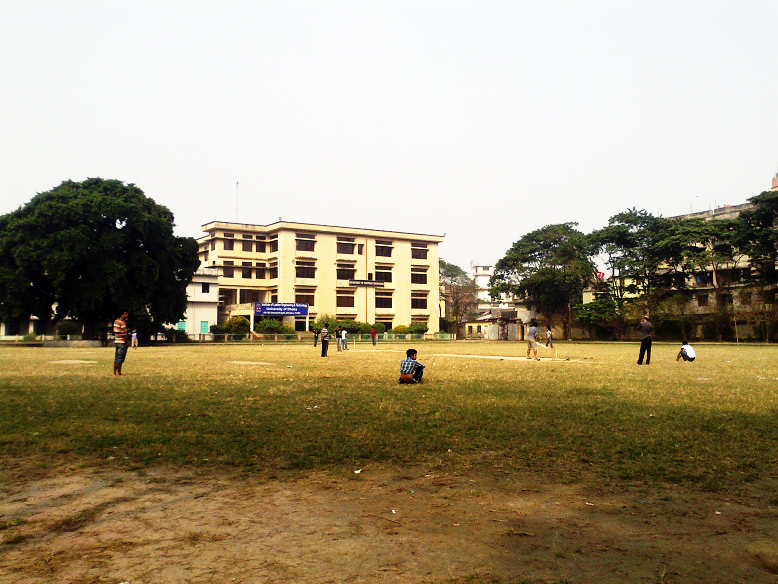
Institute of Leather Engineering and Technology

Institute of Leather Engineering and Technology was established in 1949 for advanced research on leather. It is the largest institute of University of Dhaka in terms of size. This institute has been playing a unique role in research related to leather industry since its inception. University of Dhaka completes the admission process in Leather Engineering, Footwear Engineering and Leather Product Engineering.

== History ==
In August 1947, just after the end of British rule, the Ministry of Industry approved the formation of the institute. Officially, it was founded in June 1949 and academic activities started from 1952. Later, the institute was renamed East Pakistan Institute of Leather Technology.

To provide better academic and educational facilities, the institute was transferred to the Ministry of Education and placed under the administrative control of the technical education in 1967.

After liberation, the institute was recognized as the Bangladesh College of Leather Technology and was involved with diploma, certificate and artisan level education until 1979. The government introduced a graduate course in B.Sc. Engineering in Leather under the University of Dhaka with the 1979–1980 academic session.

The college was then named as Bangladesh College of Leather Engineering and Technology.

On 18 August 2011, the college was handed over to University of Dhaka with its resource and manpower.

== Faculty and departments ==
ILET is an institute of the faculty of Engineering and Technology of University of Dhaka. There are three departments:

1. Leather Engineering
2. Footwear Engineering
3. Leather Products Engineering

ILET currently offers a Bachelor of Science in Leather Engineering, Bachelor of Science in Leather Products Engineering, Bachelor of Science in Footwear Engineering, and Master of Science in Leather Engineering, Master of Science in Leather Products Engineering, Master of Science in Footwear Engineering. The course contains theory sessions with a high proportion of practical content which is undertaken in the laboratories.

Leather engineering is a professional engineering discipline that deals with The manufacturing technology of leather, biochemistry of proteins, principles of pre-tannage, analytical chemistry of pre–tanning materials, biotechnology of leather manufacture, mechanics of leather machines, post tanning operations, analytical chemistry of post tanning & finishing agents, and analytical chemistry of leather involved in leather manufacturing.

Leather Products Engineering & Footwear Engineering are professional engineering disciplines that deals with The manufacturing technology of leather goods & footwear, testing of allied materials related to goods & footwear, quality control, supply chain management etc.
