= College of Aviation & Technology =

Engineering institute in Bangladesh

Coordinates: 23.875176°N 90.392434°E

College of Aviation Technology, Sector 16J, Road 13, Plot 22, Uttara, Dhaka 1230, Bangladesh
- Motto: Knowledge Experience Progress
- Type: Department of Aeronautical & Aviation National University
- Established: 2003
- Affiliations: National University of Bangladesh(College Code: 6620), Edexcel-UK, Bangladesh Technical Education Board, IAA, EASA Address: COLLEGE OF AVIATION TECHNOLOGY, Sector 16J, Road 13, Plot 22, Uttara, Dhaka 1230, Bangladesh
- President: Israk Hossain
- Principal: Jasmin Sultana
- Location: COLLEGE OF AVIATION TECHNOLOGY, Sector 16J, Road 13, Plot 22, Uttara, Dhaka 1230, Banglad, Dhaka, Bangladesh

College of Aviation & Technology (CATECH) is an engineering institute in Bangladesh to provide internationally recognized Higher Academic Qualification in Aeronautical Engineering as well as pilot training. The college is an approved learning center of Edexcel, BTEB and National University of Bangladesh.

== Academic programs ==
CATECH offers 4 years Hons BBA in Aviation Management & BSc in Aeronautical and Aviation Science courses Under the National University Bangladesh. It is located in Uttara in Dhaka.

=== Undergraduate level ===
At undergraduate level CATECH offers: 1. BSc (Hons) in Aeronautical and Aviation Science 2. BBA (Hons) in Aviation Management 3. B.Eng. Aeronautical Engineering.

- B.Eng. Aeronautical Engineering (length of 48 months)
- BBA Major in Aviation Management (length of 48 months)

=== Graduate level ===
At graduate level CATECH offers: Post Graduate Diploma in Strategic Management and Leadership, Diploma in Aviation Operation

- MBA Major in Aviation Management (length of 24 months)
- Executive MBA in Major in Aviation Management (length of 18 months)

=== Diploma ===
(length of 3 months) CFD & Applied Aerodynamics Aerospace Engineering Design Aeromechanics Aviation Hospitality Air Hostess and Cabin Crew Aviation Management Travel, Tourism & Ticketing Aeromodelling Airlines Cost Management Air Travel Management Aircraft Leasing

=== Pilot training ===
Pilot training courses prepare students for private and commercial pilot licences.
