= Uttara Government College =

- Type: Government college
- Established: 2013
- Principal: Prof. Dr. Md. Hafiz Uddin Bhuiya
- Location: Dakshinkhan, 1229, Bangladesh; 23.8524°N 90.4106°E
- Colours: White, Grey
- Website: www.ugc.edu.bd

Uttara Government College, Dhaka (Bengali: উত্তরা সরকারি কলেজ, ঢাকা) is a public college situated near Airport Road at Dhaka in Bangladesh. The college was established in 2013 and opened on 7 August 2014 with 580 students. It is housed in a 6-storey building with a playground. The college has a total of 900 seats for students. The previous name of the college was Jatir Janak Bangabandhu Sheikh Mujibur Rahman Government College.

== Students ==
In this college, there are approximately 1814 students.

Seat Capacity (Per Session) by Group
Group	Number of Seats
Science	300
Business Studies	300
Humanities	300

== Dress Code ==
=== Boys ===
- White Shirt with a monogram on the pocket
- Shoulder board on the shoulders
- Ash-colored pants
- White shoes

=== Girls ===
- White Shirt
- Ash-colored gown
- Monogram on the upper part of the right arm
- Shoulder board on the shoulders
- White shoes

=== Shoulder Board Colors by Academic Division ===
- Science Division: Red
- Humanities Division: Maroon
- Business Division: Green

== Festivals and Cultural Activities ==
The college celebrates various national festivals such as Victory Day, International Mother Language Day, and Independence Day. Discussion sessions on a range of topics are organized. Various essay writing and general knowledge competitions are also held. An annual cultural program is performed.

In addition, events such as science fairs, pitha festivals, and debate festivals are organized.
