= Perdana College of Malaysia =

Private college in Malaysia and Bangladesh

Coordinates: 23.8674°N 90.4031°E

- Motto: Inspiring, Excelling, Leading
- Type: Private College
- Established: 1995
- Location: Kuala Lumpur, Malaysia
- Campus: Urban
- Website: perdanacollege.com

Perdana College of Malaysia is a private college founded in 1995 with two campuses, one in Kuala Lumpur, Malaysia and another in Dhaka, Bangladesh where students may earn a foreign degree while taking some or all of their classes in Dhaka and Kuala Lumpur. Some programs can be completed in Dhaka while others are completed overseas at one of Perdana's partner universities.

== About ==
Perdana college is a sister campus of UCSI University of Malaysia. Because many students finish their degrees at Perdana's partner universities, enrollment fluctuates, averaging about 100 students per year. Due to its unique relationship with UCSI, all Perdana graduates receive their degrees from there andUrban are considered graduates from that university.

== Foreign partner universities ==
Due to the UCSI University relationship, Perdana has partnerships with five other universities worldwide and have a 100% credit transfer rate and excellent student visa rate to these institutions. They are:

- Northumbria University, United Kingdom.
- Acadia University, Canada
- Algoma University, Canada
- University of Manitoba, Canada
- Curtin University of Technology, Australia

== Academic programs ==
Beginning in 2009 there are three different degree programs completable in the college:

- Business Administration
- Accounting
- Mobile Computing

In addition, Perdana also offers part of multiple other degree programs listed below with universities where the program can be completed in parentheses.

- Business Information Systems (UCSI, Northumbria)
- Business Information Technology (Northumbria)
- Business (Northumbria)
- Business Administration/Commerce (Algoma, Acadia, Curtin, Manitoba, Northumbria)
- Information Technology (Alogma)
- Computer Science (Alcadia, Alogma)
- Computing (UCSI)
- UrbanApplied Computing (Northumbria)
- Information Technology (Curtin)
- Computer Systems and Networking (Curtin)
- Engineering (Manitoba, UCSI)

== University Foundation Program ==
Also called Pre-University Program, the University Foundation Program (UFP) qualifies students who have completed SSC / ICSE / Grade 11 / GCE "O" Level to enter directly into year one of a university degree program. Completable in three semesters, the program works also for students who do not have the appropriate academic background or experience to gain access directly into a specific university program. Since its inception in 1995, hundreds of students have either completed the program and finished a degree in Dhaka or advanced to overseas institutions.

== Alumni ==
On 5 August 2009 Perdana and its parent institution UCSI University launched a Bangladesh alumni chapter in hopes to foster increasing co-operation between the Malaysians and Bangladeshis and promote greater prosperity of the region. The launch was officiated by Bangladeshi Minister of Education, Mr. Nurul Islam Nahid, High Commissioner of Malaysia to Bangladesh, Mr. Jamaluddin Sabeh and UCSI University President, Peter T. S. Ng.

Members of Perdana's Alumni Chapter will have access to the school's library, opportunities to serve on College Developmental Advisory Boards, as well as the ability to search and check for old friends.
