= Sylhet Science And Technology College =

Sylhet Math & Technology College
- সিলেট বিজ্ঞান ও প্রযুক্তি কলেজ
- Type: Intermediate college
- Established: 2014
- Chairman: Muhibur Rahman
- Rector: Salma Khanom Chowdhury
- Principal: Mohammed Jewel Miah
- Students: 1000+
- Location: Sylhet City, Bangladesh; 24.9023°N 91.8638°E
- Website: sylhetsciencetechcollege.edu.bd/sstc

Sylhet Science and Technology College (SSTC) is an intermediate college in the city of Sylhet, Bangladesh. It is situated on Mirer Maidan, near the holy Shah Jalal's Dargah Sharif.

== History ==
Founded in 2014, it is the first dedicated science college in the city. It participated in the Higher Secondary Examination (HSC) for the first time in 2016. The Muhibur Rahman Foundation runs the college and Muhibur Rahman is the chairman of the governing body.
