= Mymensingh Engineering College =

Public Undergraduate Engineering College in Bangladesh

Mymensingh Engineering College (MEC)
- ময়মনসিংহ ইঞ্জিনিয়ারিং কলেজ
- Type: Public engineering college
- Established: 2007; 19 years ago
- Academic affiliations: University of Dhaka
- Principal: Professor Dr. Md. Mizanur Rahman
- Students: Around 700
- Location: Mymensingh Sadar Upazila, Mymensingh, Bangladesh
- Campus: /5.5/; Urban, 7 km from divisional city 2.8 hectares (7.0 acres)
- Website: mec.ac.bd mec.edu.bd

Mymensingh Engineering College (Bengali: ময়মনসিংহ ইঞ্জিনিয়ারিং কলেজ), commonly referred to as MEC, is a public undergraduate engineering college in Mymensingh, Bangladesh, and was established in 2007. This is a constituent college of the University of Dhaka. Every year, around 180 students get accepted to undergraduate programs in Electrical and Electronic Engineering (EEE), Civil Engineering (CE) and Computer Science and Engineering (CSE).

== History ==
In January 2004, then Finance Minister M. Saifur Rahman approved the creation of Mymensingh Engineering College and Sylhet Engineering College. On 9 May 2006, a budget of ৳56 crore was proposed for Mymensingh Engineering College project in the meeting of the Executive Committee of National Economic Council (ECNEC). The two Engineering College project works continued from July 2004 to June 2007. After this time it was handed over to the Ministry of Education. During the revised Budget fixation for Sylhet Engineering College, the Minister hinted about a plan to merge these two colleges into an engineering university. The college was inaugurated by Former Minister Motiur Rahman on 4 July 2009. After that, a project of ৳27 cr was taken in hand for development of Mymensingh Engineering College. The project was fully completed in 2011.

The administration admitted 60 students (by admission test) into the Electrical and Electronic Engineering Department on 4 July 2009. In the 2008–2009 session, EEE department was introduced as the 1st batch of Mymensingh Engineering College. In the 2014-15 session, the CE department was introduced.

There is a hope that in future it will be upgraded into a full-fledged public engineering university called Mymensingh University of Engineering and Technology (MUET).

== Academics ==
=== Affiliation ===
Mymensingh Engineering College is affiliated with University of Dhaka under the Faculty of Engineering & Technology. The University of Dhaka oversees MEC's admissions process.

=== Departments ===
- Department of Electrical and Electronic Engineering (EEE)
- Department of Civil Engineering (CE)
- Department of Computer Science & Engineering (CSE)

== Campus ==
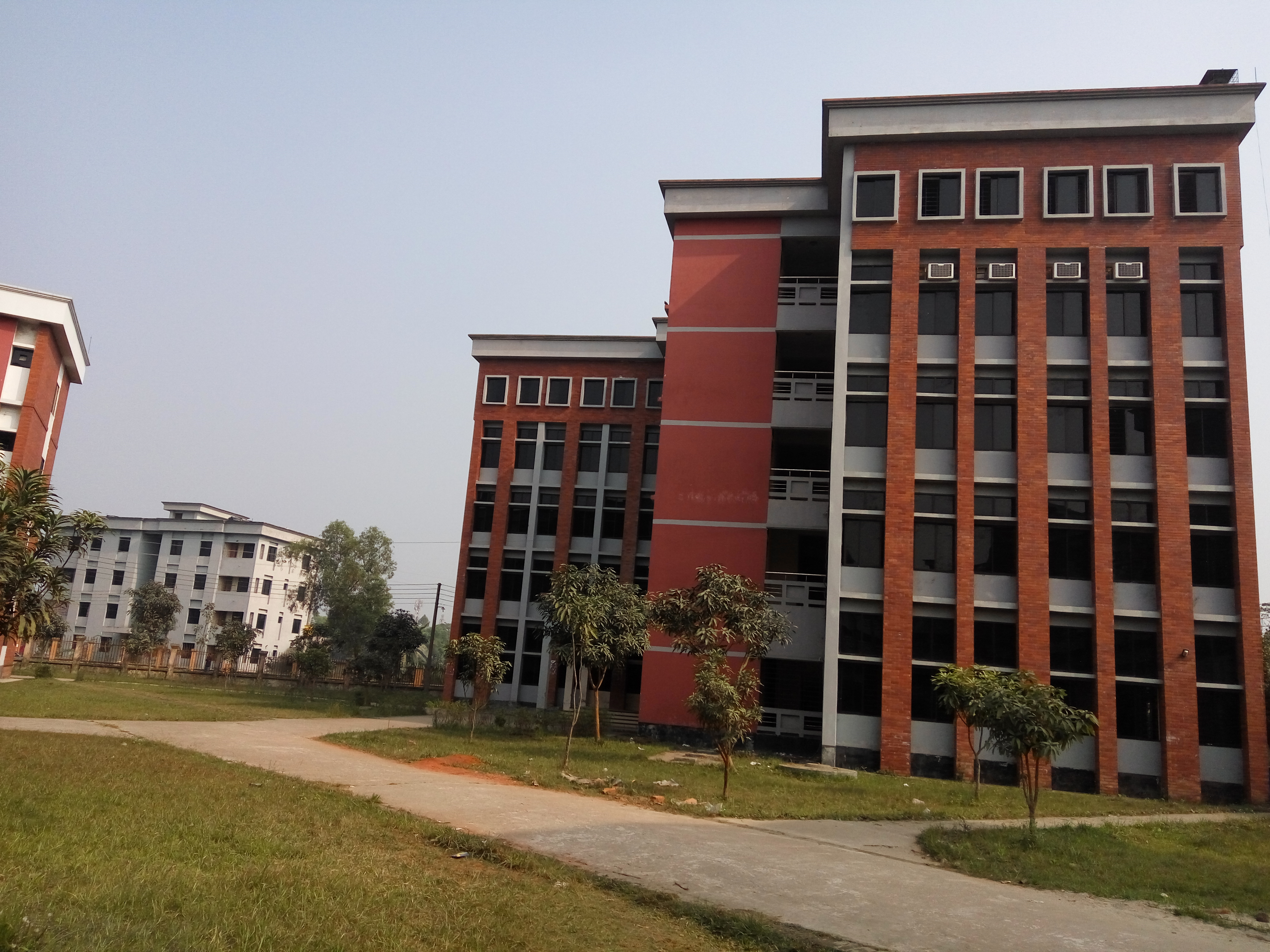
Department of Electrical & Electronics Engineering

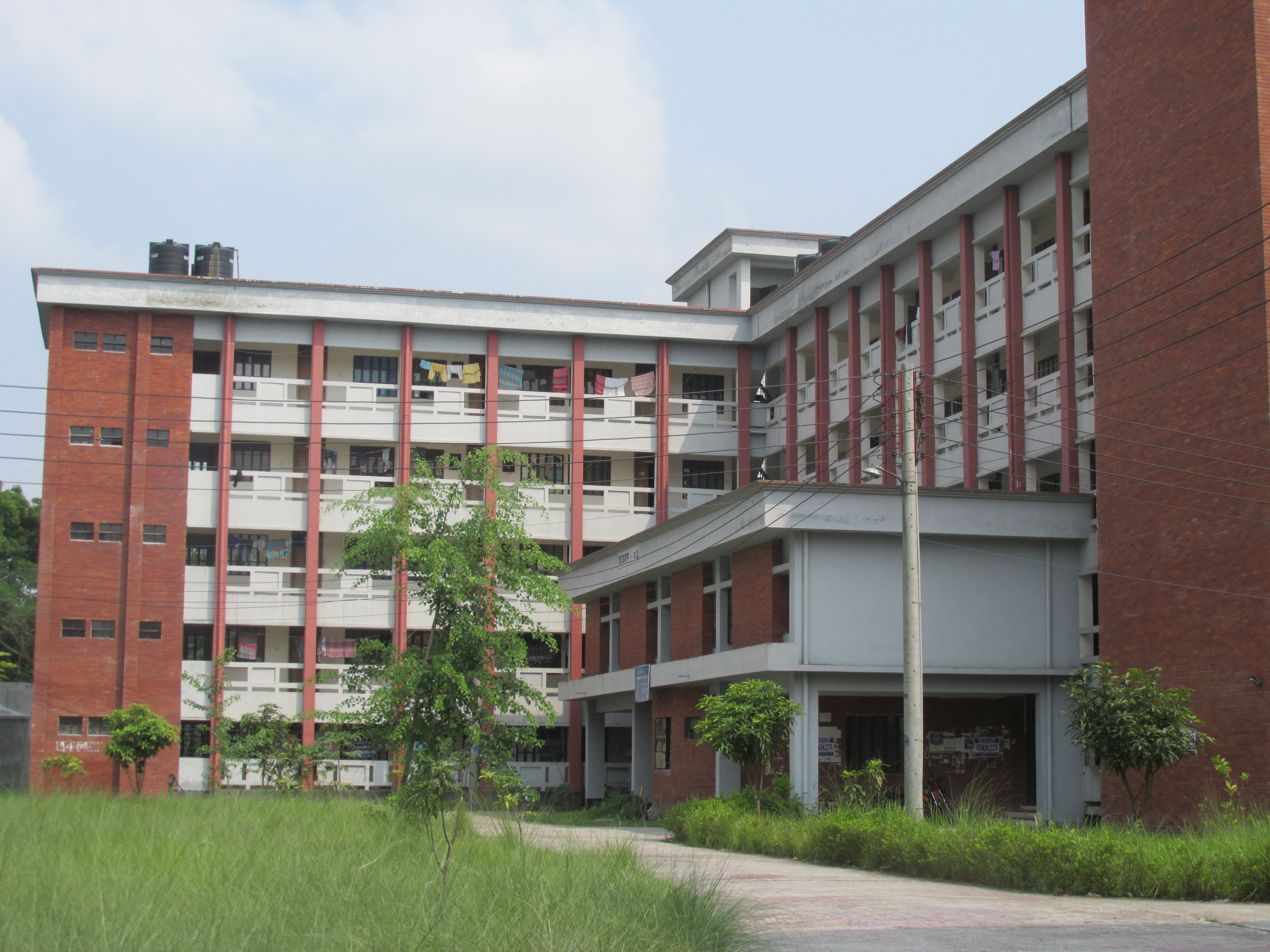
Amar Ekushey Hall, Mymensingh Engineering College

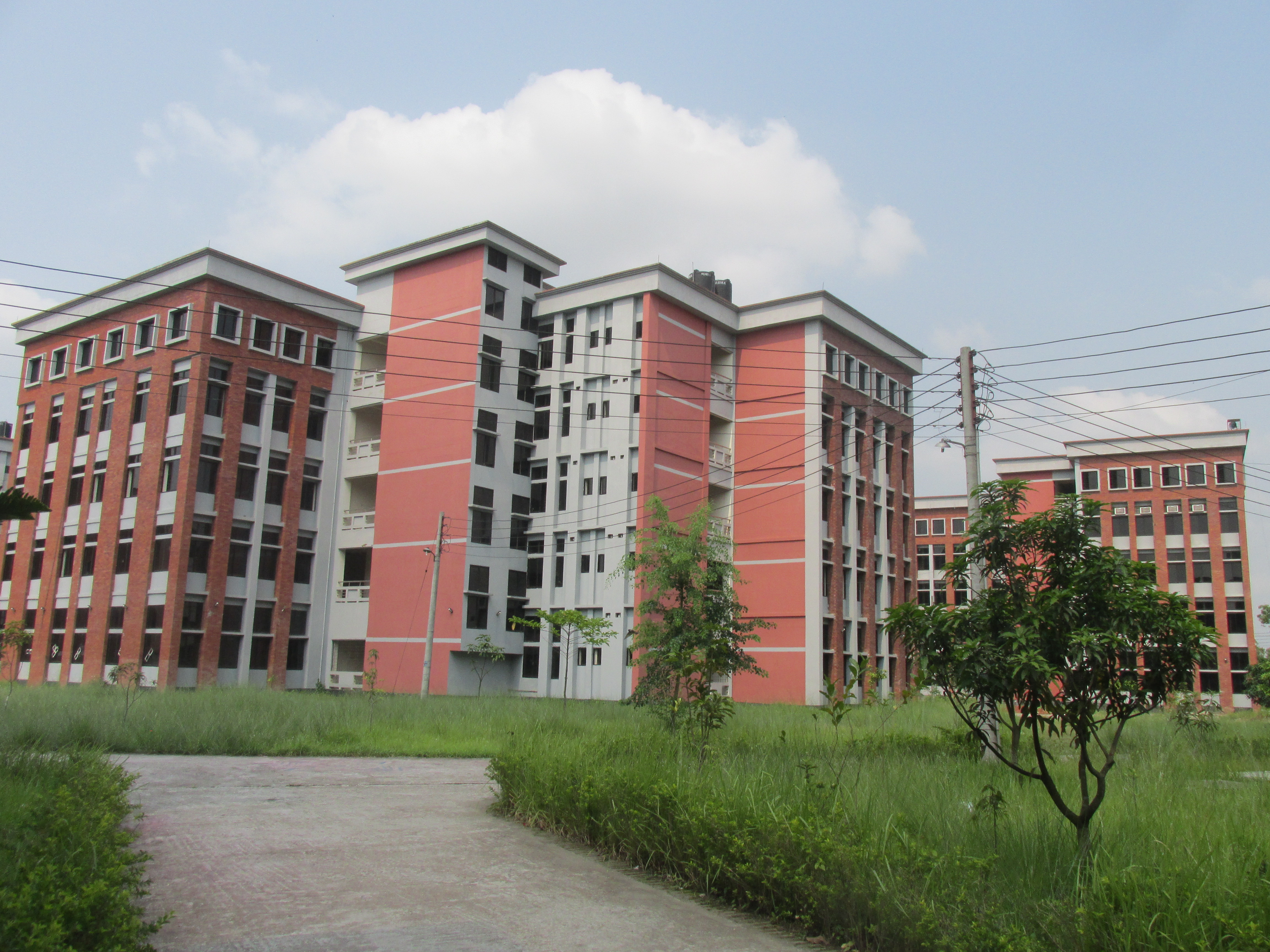
Mymensingh Engineering College

Mymensingh Engineering College is located about 7 kilometres (4.3 mi) from the main city of Mymensingh towards the Tangail road. Every building is accommodated in a multi-storied building over an area of about 7 acres (2.8 ha) land. There are 13 buildings including an administrative building and faculty buildings. There are also quarters for teachers and staff.

The central library is within walking distance from the academic buildings and student residences. It is in a compact building with limited built-in facilities to provide teaching aids such as a reading facility, book lending, and journals to the students and teachers of Mymensingh Engineering College.

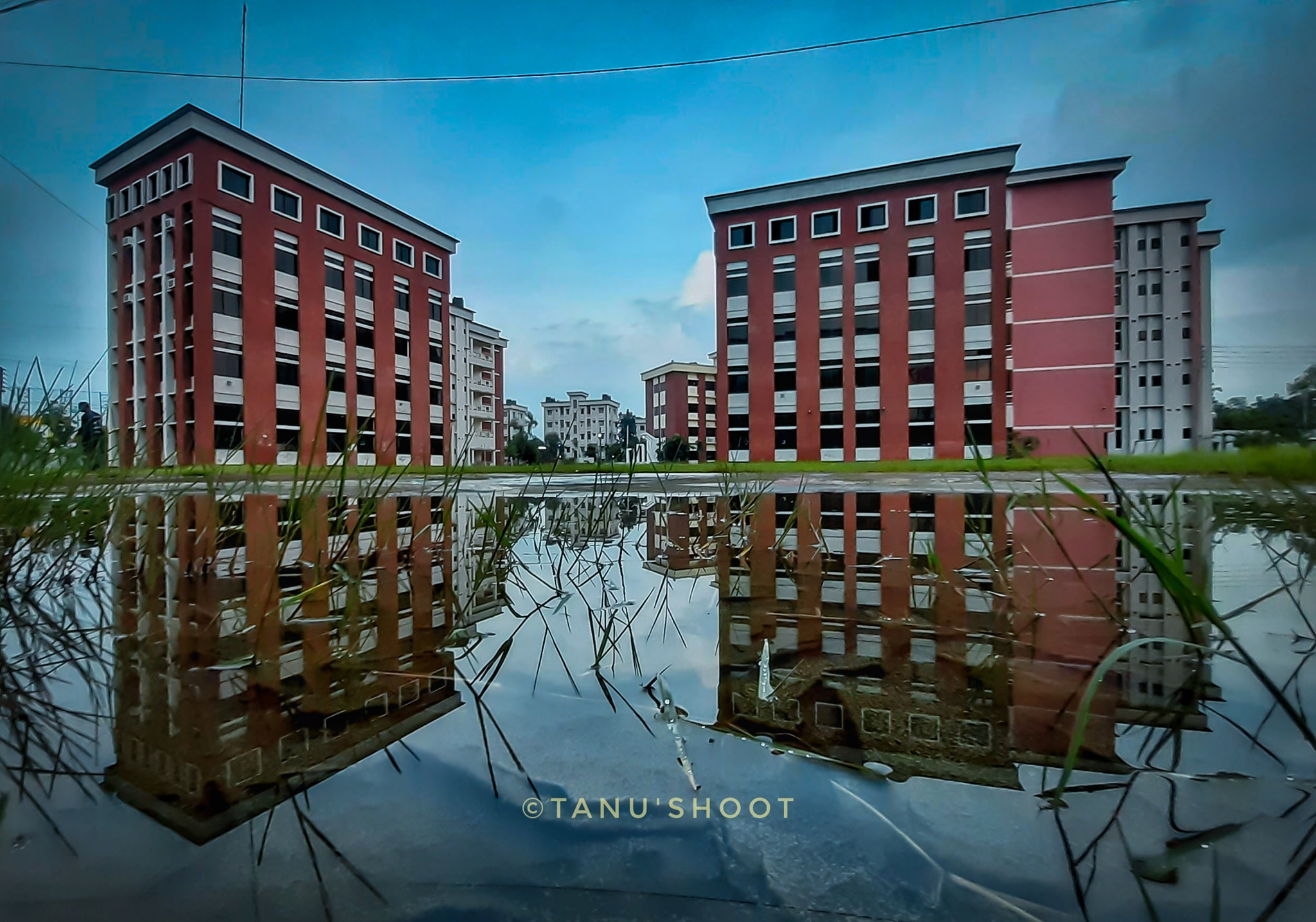
MEC Campus

The college has an Auditorium Complex having a seating capacity of about 200 which is capable of holding conferences, seminars, and other cultural programs. Besides this, there are a seminar and conference rooms with limited capacity in engineering degree awarding departments.

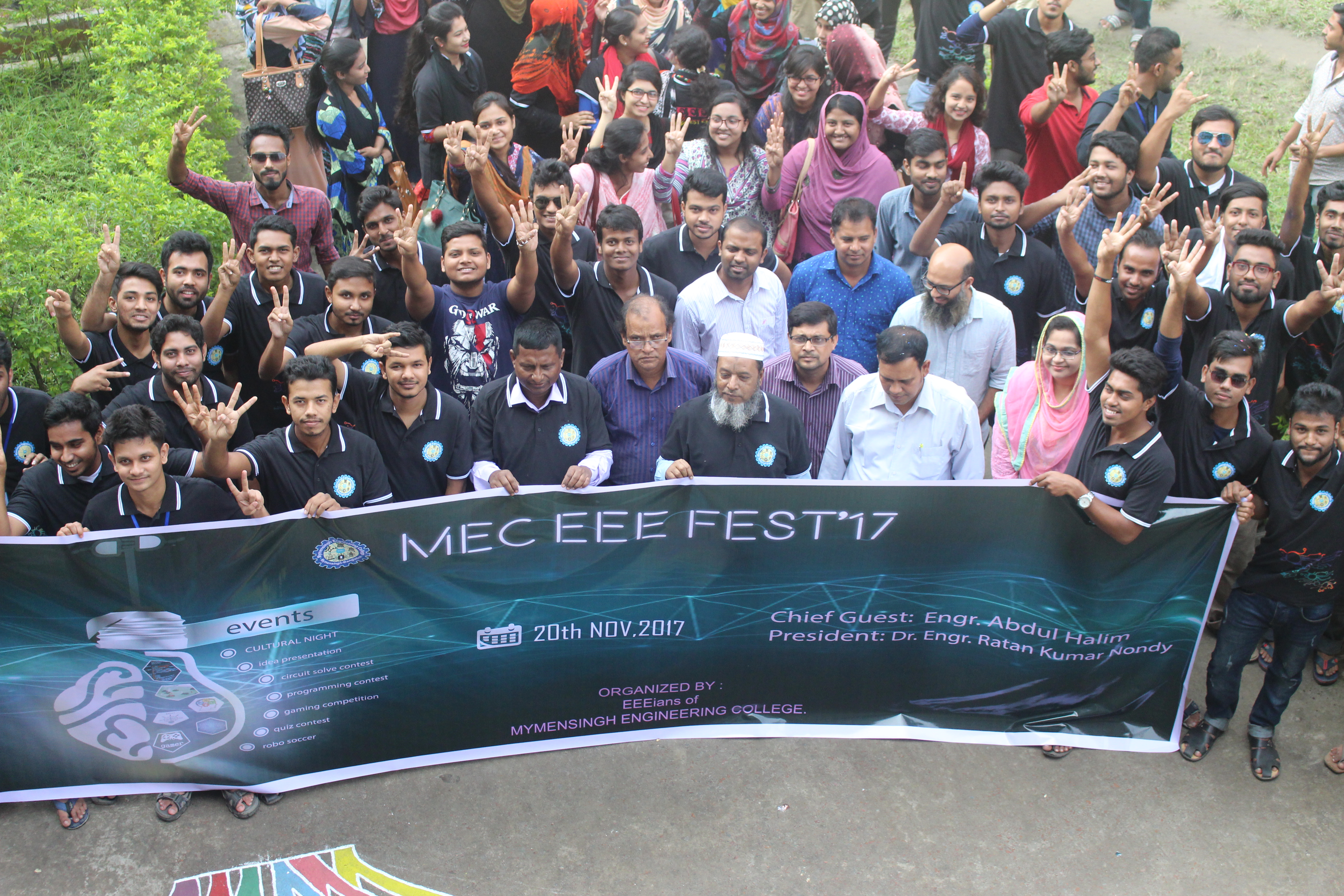
EEE Fest2k17

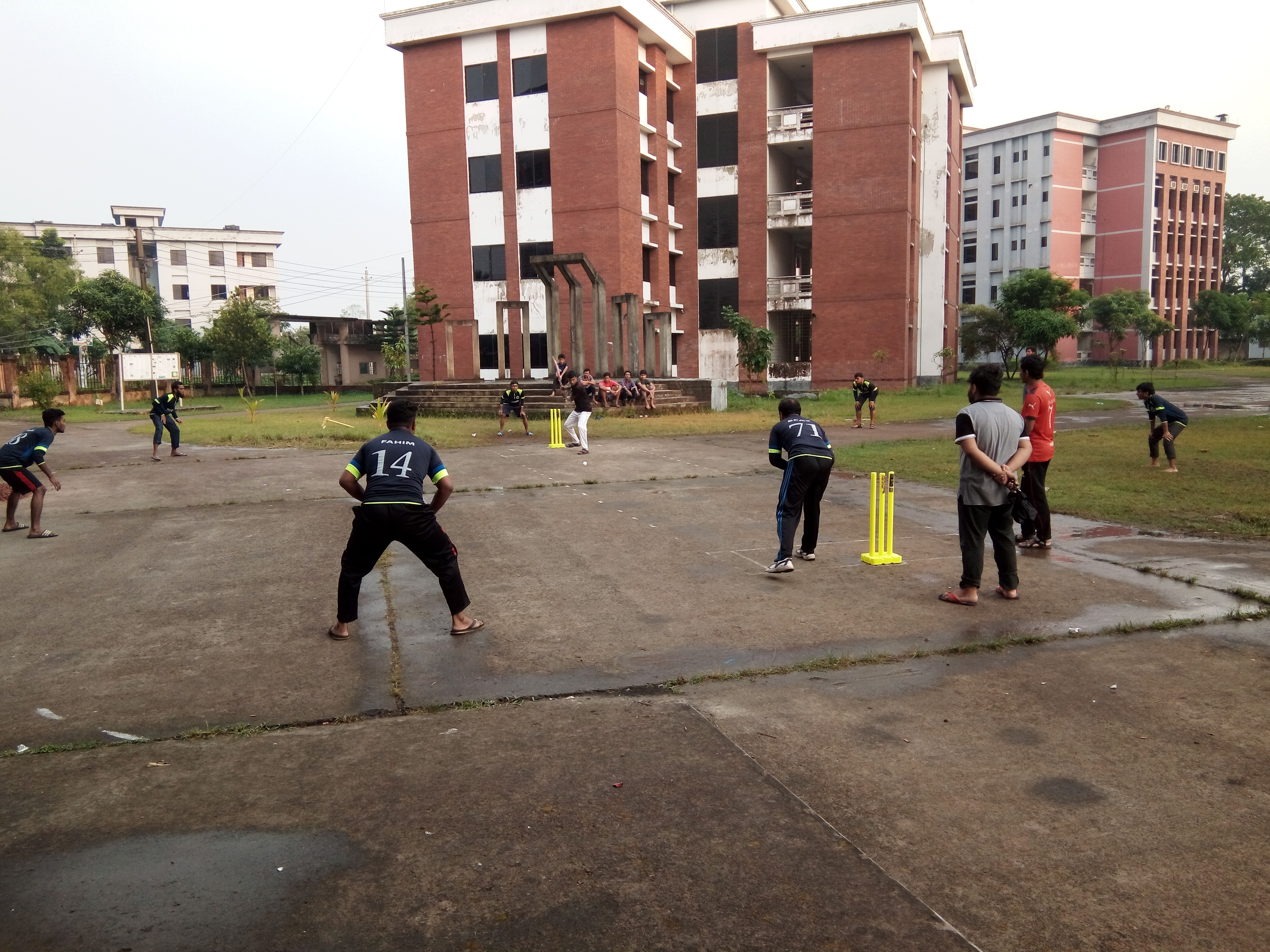
MEC

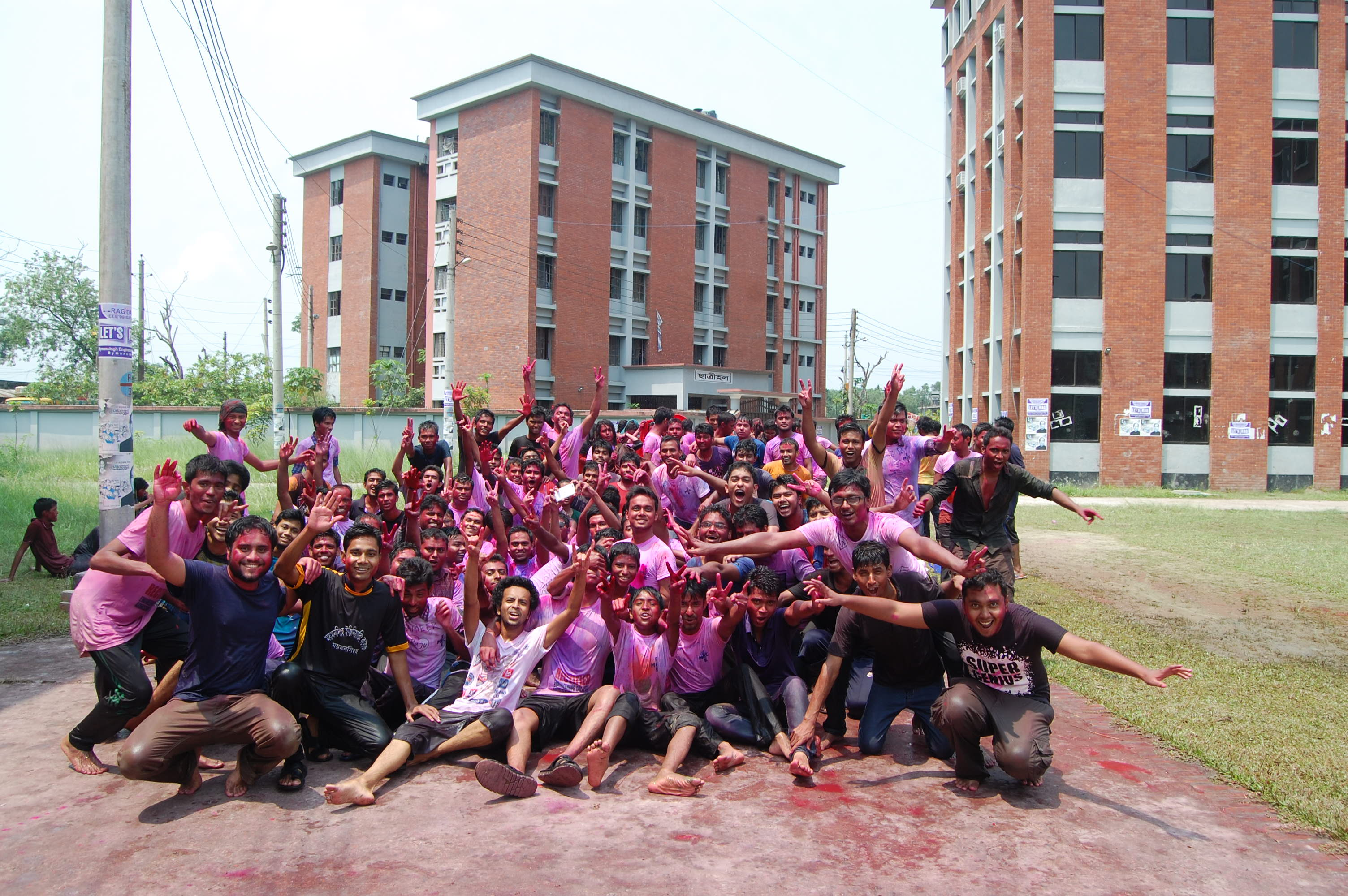
MEC 2nd Batch Rag Day

== Lab facilities ==
=== Department of Electrical and Electronic Engineering (EEE) ===
- Electronics Lab
- Electrical Circuit Lab
- Electrical Machine Lab
- Power System & High voltage Lab
- Digital Signal Processing Lab
- Structural Machine Lab

=== Department of Civil Engineering (CE) ===
- Transportation Lab
- Drawing Lab
- Hydraulics Lab
- Environment Lab
- Geo-Technical Lab
- Physics Lab
- Chemistry Lab
- Machine Shop
- Welding Shop
- Surveying Shop
- Foundry Shop
- Wood Shop
- Language Lab
- AutoCAD Lab
- Structural Engineering Lab

=== Department of Computer Science and Engineering (CSE) ===
- Networking Lab
- Communication & Microprocessor Lab
- Central Computer Center Lab
- Computer Lab
- Microprocessor Lab
- Software Lab
- ACM Lab
- Digital Logic Design Lab
- ATTS Lab

Department of General Science (Non-tech)

- Physics Lab
- Chemistry Lab

== Research areas ==
- Power System
- Nano Electronics
- Communication & Networking System
- Digital Signal Processing (DSP)
- Artificial Intelligence
- Smart Grid
- Renewable Energy
- Power Electronics
- Solar Energy
- Biomedical Optics
- Data Science
- Machine Learning
