= Agricultural University College, Mymensingh =

Agricultural university in Mymensingh, Bangladesh

Agricultural University College
- AUC (Formerly K B College)

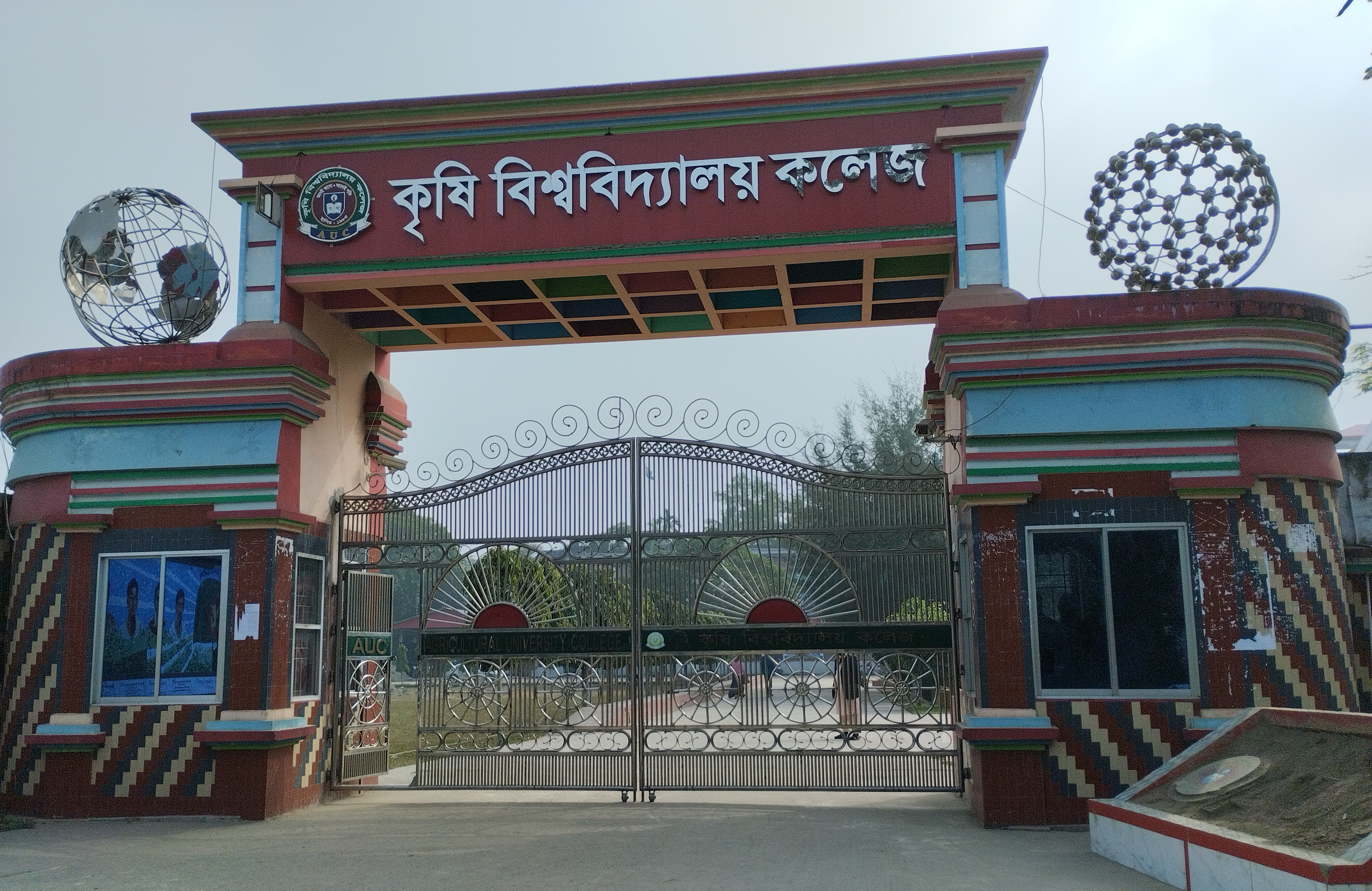
- Main Entrance of Agricultural University College

Location
- Bangladesh Agricultural University Campus, Mymensingh; 2202; Bangladesh
- Coordinates: 24.7220°N 90.4267°E

Information
- Former name: K. B. I. College
- Type: Public
- Motto: জ্ঞানই আলো, আলোই শক্তি (Knowledge is Light, Light is Power)
- Established: 23 September 1985
- Chairman: Md Rafiqul Islam Sardar
- Principal: M. Ataur Rahman
- Teaching staff: 30
- Employees: 22
  - Grade 11: 850
  - Grade 12: 850
- Education system: NCTB Curriculum
- Language: Bangla
- Campus size: 3 Acres
- Publication: Adamya (অদম্য)
- EIIN: 111913
- Website: www.aucm.edu.bd

Agricultural University College (Bengali: কৃষি বিশ্ববিদ্যালয় কলেজ) is a higher secondary college of Bangladesh located at Bangladesh Agricultural University Campus, Mymensingh. Its former name was K.B. Intermediate College. The college was established in 1985.

== History ==
The college was established on 23 September 1985 under the patronage of Bangladesh Agricultural University. It is located in the residential area adjacent to Gate No. 1 of Bangladesh Agricultural University.

== Infrastructure ==
Presently, the procedure of the college is being conducted on its own 3 acres of land. Infrastructure includes a four-storied building, two three-storied buildings, and a single-storied building. Besides, the college has separate parking arrangements for buses, cars, and bicycles, bikes and has its own canteen. There is a playground in the college. On the other side, there is a flower garden and a small lake with an fountain. There is a Shaheed Minar on the college premises. Murals of language martyrs have been built adjacent to the main gate with a massive boundary wall. Besides, in front of the college, there is a sculpture "Abstract of the Liberation War" built by the famous sculptor Shyamal Chowdhury.

== Enrollment ==
Currently, 1700 students are studying at Agricultural University College, including 850 each in eleventh and twelfth classes. In each class, 730 students study under the Science Group and the other 120 under the Business Study Group. Previously, there was an admission test, but now an interview is required.

Year	Group	Number	Total	
First Year	Science	730	850	1700
First Year	Business Studies	120	850	1700
Second Year	Science	730	850	1700
Second Year	Business Studies	120	850	1700

== Administration ==
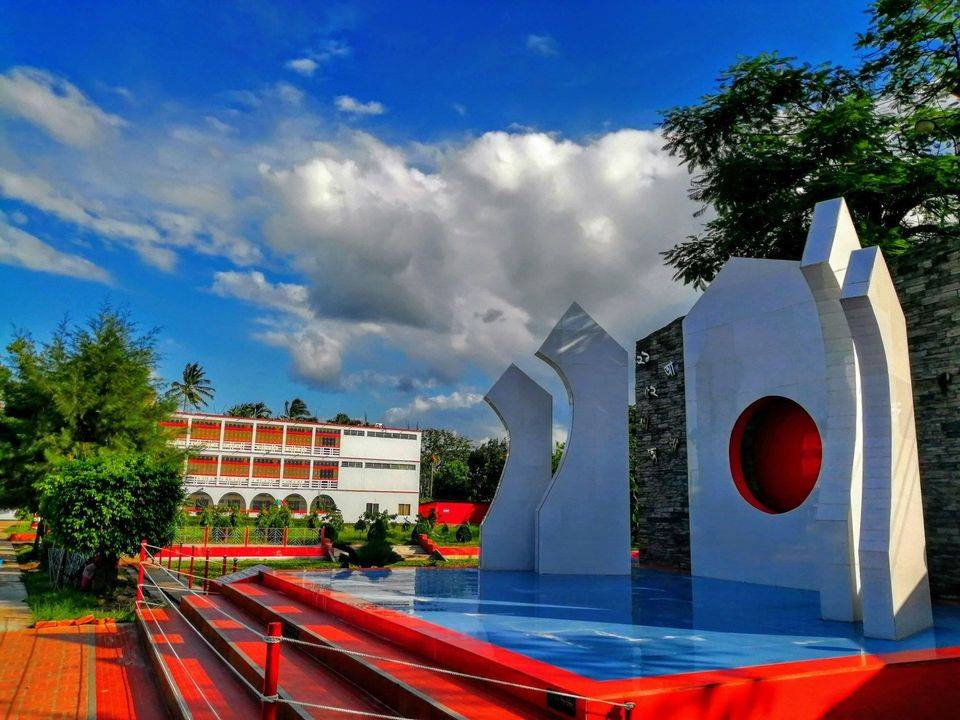
Agricultural University College Martyr Monument.

Teachers
Designation	No. of posts
Principal	1
Assistant Professor	10
Lecturer	14
Demonstrator	3
Senior Teacher	1
Physical Instructor	1
Total	30

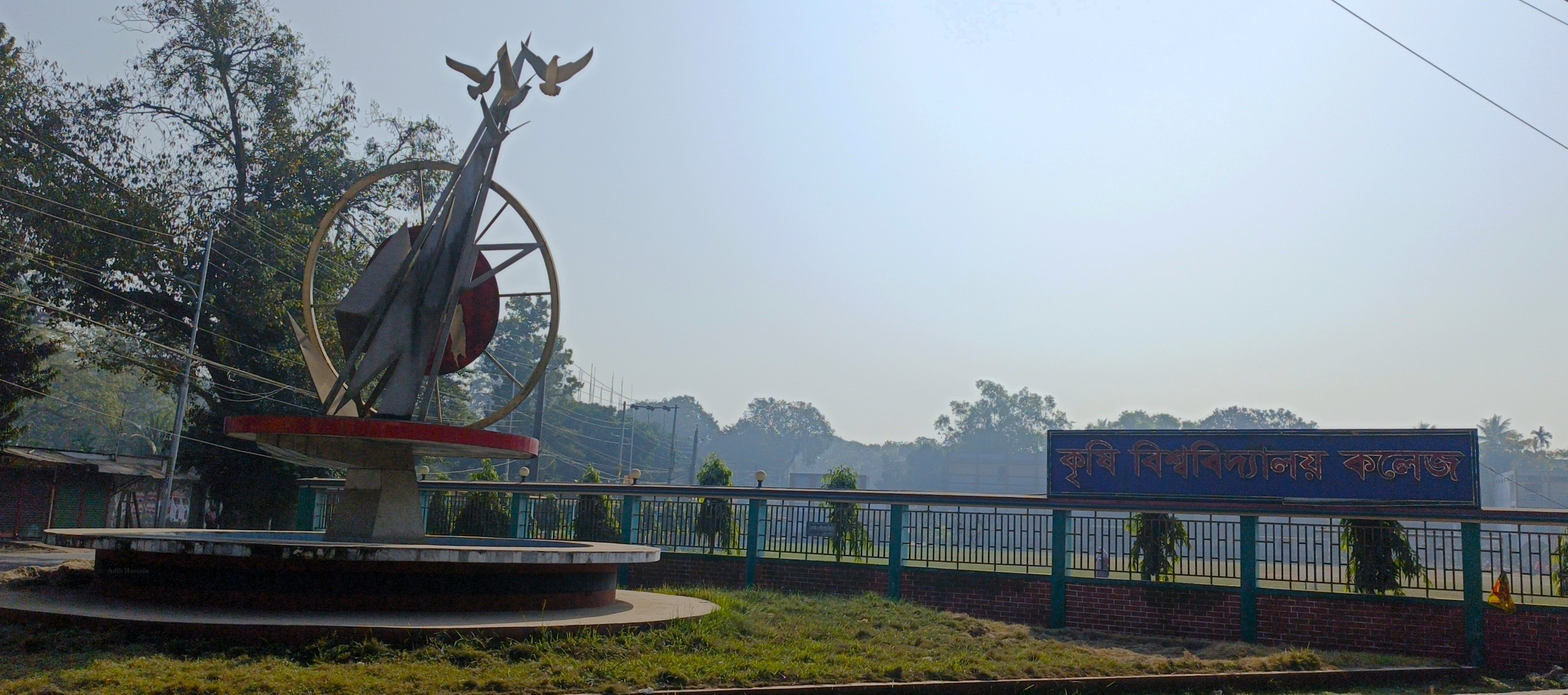
Abstract of the Liberation War, located at the College Campus.

Others
Post	No.
Class 3 Employees	5
Class 4 Employees	17

=== Governing body ===
The governing body of Agricultural University College consists of seven members. There is a chairman, two members, a guardian representative, two teacher representatives and a member secretary. The principal acts as the member secretary.

== Education ==
The college follows the national curriculum. The college operates by the governing body of the college. The college has a library with 15,000 volumes, and physics, chemistry, computer, biology, and mathematics labs. Bright students are sent to participate in mathematics, physics, and astronomy Olympiads.

Departments and Subjects
Group	Subjects		
Group	Compulsory Subjects	Group Subjects	Elective Subjects
Science	Bangla; English; Information and Communication Technology	Physics; Chemistry	Higher Mathematics; Biology
Business Studies	Bangla; English; Information and Communication Technology	Accounting; Business Organization & Management	Production Management and Marketing; Finance, Banking and Insurance

== College uniform ==
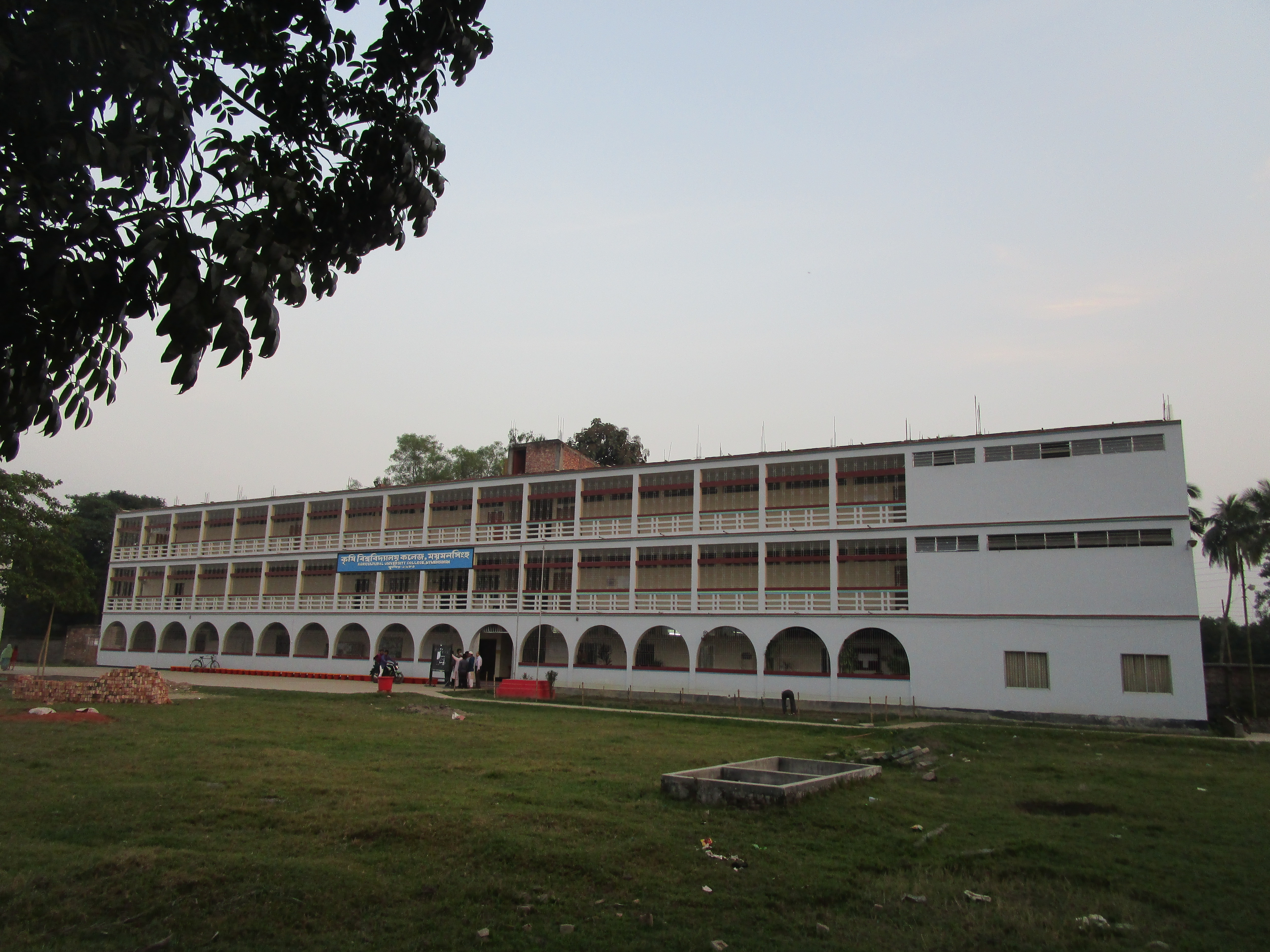
Agricultural University College Academic Building-1

For boys

- Deep Maroon Pants
- White Shirts
- Coffee Brown color Tie
- Black Shoes

For girls

- White Salwar and Pajama
- Deep Maroon Scarves
- White Apron
