= Royal Media College =

Coordinates: 24.7634°N 90.4019°E

- রয়েল মিডিয়া কলেজ
- Motto: শিক্ষাই আলো
- Motto in English: Education is Light
- Established: 2005; 21 years ago
- Location: Mymensingh, Bangladesh

Royal Media College is an intermediate college in Mymensingh, Bangladesh. It is situated at 18 Gangadas Guha Road, Mymensingh, between the Male and Female Teachers' Training Colleges. The college is now considered an education-providing institution and has attracted retired teachers from different colleges in the town.

Established by Isha Khan Rajand and Snehashish Chandra De after running the Media Coaching Centre. Raj, along with their colleagues, felt the necessity of establishing a college level educational institution in the town.

- Location* : The college is located opposite the Mymensingh District Judge's Court. On one side are the Women's Teachers Training College and on the other side are the Male Teachers Training College and St. Crescent School. However, on paper, the place is known as Batir Kal and is located on the branch road of Gangadas Guha Road.
