= List of architecture schools in Bangladesh =

This is a list of architecture schools in Bangladesh.

== Institutes ==
- Housing & Building Research Institute
- Institute of Architects Bangladesh

== Public schools ==
- Bangladesh University of Engineering & Technology, Department of Architecture, Faculty of Architecture and Planning, Dhaka Estd. 1961
- Khulna University, Discipline of Architecture, School of Science, Engineering & Technology, Khulna Estd. 1991
- Shahjalal University of Science and Technology, Department of Architecture, School of Applied Sciences & Technology, Sylhet Estd. 2002
- Chittagong University of Engineering and Technology, Department of Architecture, Faculty of Architecture & Planning, Chittagong Estd. 2009
- Rajshahi University of Engineering and Technology, Department of Architecture, Rajshahi
- Khulna University of Engineering & Technology, Department of Architecture, Faculty of Architecture & Planning, Khulna
- Military Institute of Science and Technology, Department of Architecture, Dhaka Estd. 2015
- Hajee Mohammad Danesh Science & Technology University, Department of Architecture, Dinajpur
- Gopalganj Science and Technology University, Department of Architecture, Gopalganj
- Pabna University of Science & Technology, Department of Architecture, Pabna
- Dhaka University of Engineering & Technology, Gazipur, Department of Architecture, Dhaka

== Private schools ==
- American International University Bangladesh, Department of Architecture, Dhaka
- Ahsanullah University of Science and Technology, Department of Architecture, Dhaka
- Bangladesh University, Department of Architecture, Dhaka
- BRAC University, Department of Architecture, Dhaka
- Daffodil International University, Department of Architecture, Dhaka
- Fareast International University, Department of Architecture, Dhaka
- Leading University, Department of Architecture, Sylhet
- North South University, Department of Architecture, Dhaka
- Premier University, Chittagong, Department of Architecture, Chittagong
- Primeasia University, Department of Architecture, Dhaka
- Shanto-Mariam University of Creative Technology, Department of Architecture, Dhaka
- Sonargaon University, Department of Architecture, Dhaka
- Southeast University, Department of Architecture, Dhaka
- Stamford University, Department of Architecture, Dhaka
- State University of Bangladesh, Department of Architecture, Dhaka
- University of Asia Pacific, Department of Architecture, Dhaka
- World University of Bangladesh, Department of Architecture, Dhaka
