= Sylhet Engineering College =

Public engineering college in Bangladesh

- সিলেট প্রকৌশল মহাবিদ্যালয়
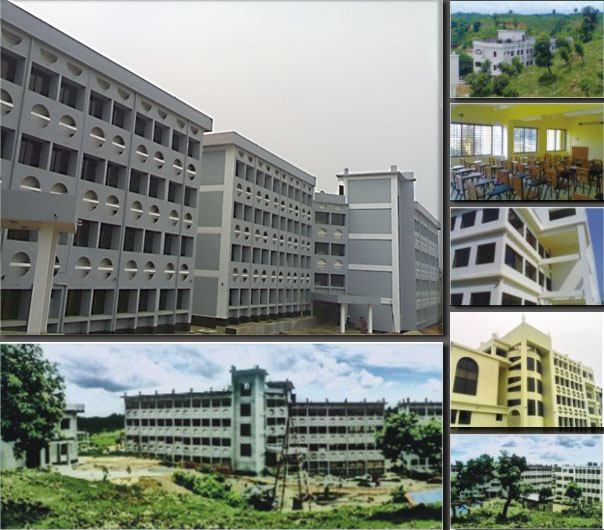
- Other name: SEC
- Type: Public engineering college
- Established: 2005; 21 years ago
- Academic affiliations: Shahjalal University of Science and Technology
- Chancellor: President Mirza Fakhrul Islam Alamgir
- Vice-Chancellor: A. M. Sarowaruddin Chowdhury
- Principal: Professor Md. Sahid Iqbal
- Students: Approx 800
- Location: Sylhet, Bangladesh
- Campus: 8 Acres; Urban
- Academic departments: 3
- Website: www.sec.ac.bd

Sylhet Engineering College (SEC; Bengali: সিলেট ইঞ্জিনিয়ারিং কলেজ) is a public undergraduate (B.Sc. Engineering) college, established in 2005. It is affiliated with the Shahjalal University of Science and Technology. Sylhet Engineering College commonly known as SEC is a public Engineering College in Sylhet, Bangladesh, which focuses on the study of engineering. Every year, around 180 students get accepted to their undergraduate programs to study engineering.

== Introduction ==
Sylhet Engineering College (SEC) was established in the year 2007 under the School of Applied Sciences & Technology, Shahjalal University of Science and Technology.

== Campus ==
The Sylhet Engineering College (SEC) campus is located at Tilagarh, approximately one kilometer away from the center of Sylhet city. There are 16 multi-storied buildings included three large academic buildings, library and computer building, administrative building, the principal's residence, teachers and staff quarters. There are two male hostels and a female hostel for students.

== Departments ==
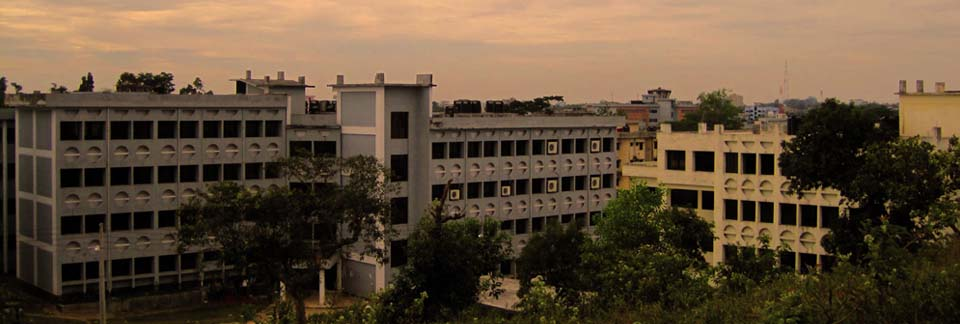
Computer Science and Engineering Department, Sylhet Engineering College

The following departments offer 4 years B.Sc. (Engineering) degree every year:

- Department of Computer Science and Engineering (CSE)
- Department of Electrical and Electronic Engineering (EEE)
- Department of Civil Engineering (CE)

== Undergraduate courses ==
Serial	Name	Seats
1	B.Sc. (Engg.) in Computer Science and Engineering (CSE)	60
2	B.Sc. (Engg.) in Electrical & Electronic Engineering (EEE)	60
3	B.Sc. (Engg.) in Civil Engineering (CE)	60

== Admission process ==
Students who have passed the SSC and HSC from Science background can apply for admission if they fulfill the minimum requirement. Admission into SEC is highly competitive and needs a high academic attainment at the SSC and HSC level. Selection of the students for admission is made through a written admission test. Academic activities are completed with four year semester credit system.

== Campus life ==
Classes are held every day from 8 am to 5 pm without weekly holidays (Thursday & Friday). All academic activities are maintained by administrative office. An educational tour is organized for the students every year. Various cultural activities and special days are celebrated in this campus e.g. International Mother language day, Independence day, Victory day and Pohela Baishakh.

== Scholarships opportunities ==
In every semester, the government would give 1950 taka per students for basis in CGPA (Top 60% in per batch or department). After completing graduation, there is a scope to study abroad with scholarship which is counted by the rank of the Shahjalal University of Science & Technology. As a new Engineering College, SECian students got the opportunity to study in world's famous universities as like the University of Texas, National University of Singapore, University of Tartu, Florida Institute of Technology, University of Greenwich, Frankfurt University of Applied Sciences, TU Dresden with full scholarships.

== Hall facility ==
There are three residential halls (five storeyed hall each), two halls for males and one hall for females. These are listed below with their capacities:

Name of Hall	Student Capacity	Provost	Assistant Provost
Bijoy 24 Hall	200	Abu Naser Mojumder	Md. Lysuzzaman
Muktijuddha Hall	200	Md. Shahid Iqbal	Md. Salah Uddin
Aporajita Hall	150	Naznin Ara	Tanny Saha

== Campus Radio ==
Campus radio was started by Computer Science & Engineering (CSE) students and is now maintained by both CSE and Electrical and Electronic Engineering.

== Lab facilities ==
=== Department of Computer Science and Engineering (CSE) ===
1. Networking Lab
2. Communication & Microprocessor Lab
3. Central Computer Center Lab
4. Computer Lab
5. Microprocessor Lab
6. Software Lab
7. ACM Lab
8. Digital Logic Design Lab
9. ATTS Lab
10. Sylhet Engineering College Research Lab

=== Department of Electrical and Electronic Engineering (EEE) ===
1. Electrical Circuit Lab
2. Electronics Lab
3. Electrical Machine Lab
4. Power System Lab
5. Power Electronics Lab
6. Digital Electronics and Microprocessor Lab
7. Digital Signal Processing Lab
8. Microwave and Communication Lab
9. ATTS Lab

=== Department of Civil Engineering (CE) ===
1. Transportation Lab
2. Drawing Lab
3. Hydraulics Lab
4. Environment Lab
5. Geo-Technical Lab
6. Physics Lab
7. Chemistry Lab
8. Machine Shop
9. Welding Shop
10. Surveying Shop
11. Foundry Shop
12. Wood Shop
13. AutoCAD Lab

== Central Library ==
The Central Library is next to the academic building; it also houses the ACM Lab.
