= Shahid Syed Nazrul Islam College =

Coordinates: 24.7618°N 90.3993°E

- শহীদ সৈয়দ নজরুল ইসলাম কলেজ
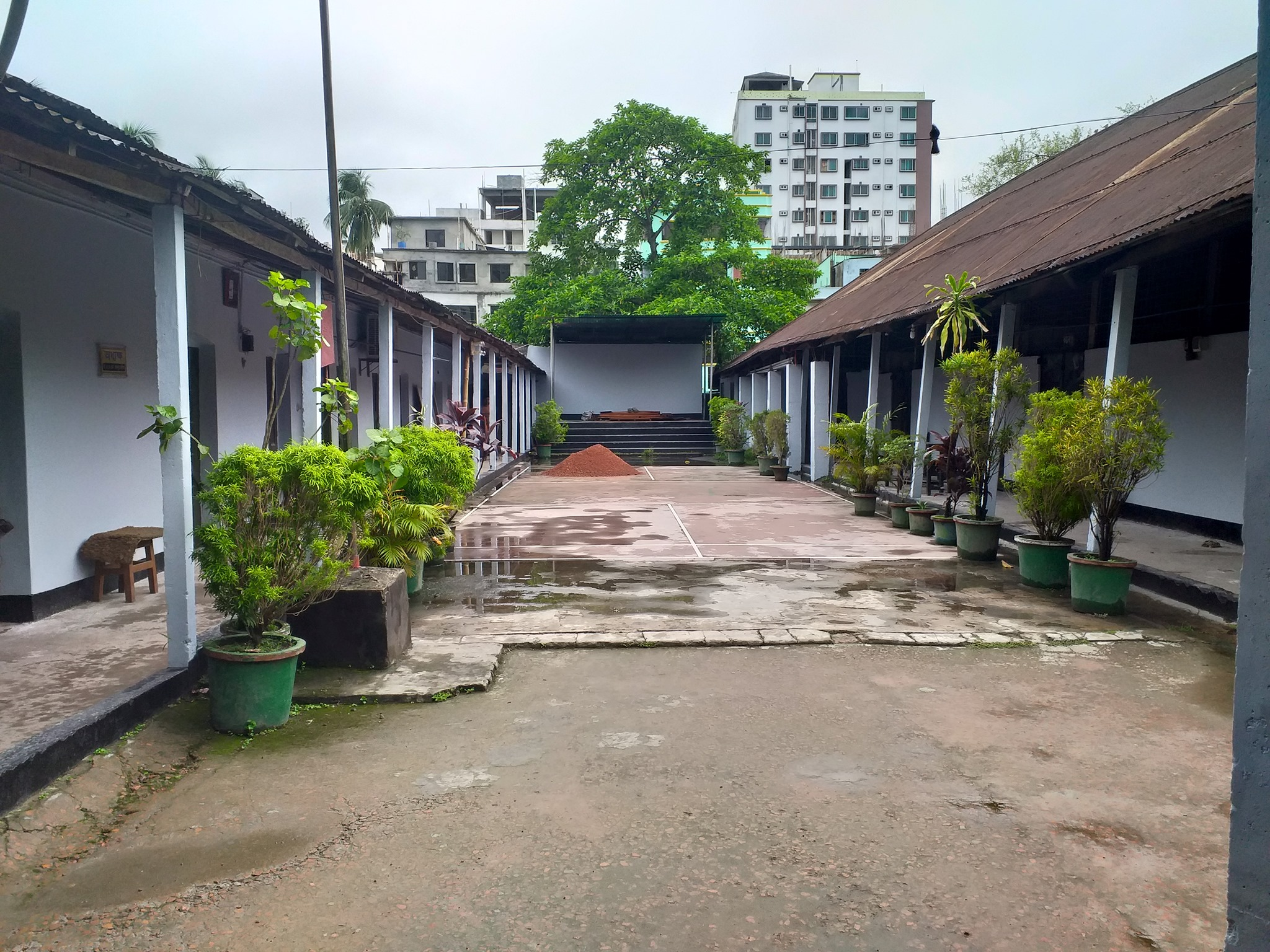
- Shahid Syed Nazrul Islam College
- Type: Private
- Established: 1999
- Principal: Dr. A.K.M. Abdur Rafique
- Students: 3,200+
- Location: Shema Choron Rai Rd, Mymensingh, 2200, Bangladesh
- Campus: Urban, 1 acre
- Language: Bangla
- Website: ssnic.edu.bd

Shahid Syed Nazrul Islam College (Bengali: শহীদ সৈয়দ নজরুল ইসলাম কলেজ) is a college in Mymensingh, Bangladesh, founded in 1999. The college was named after Shahid Syed Nazrul Islam, who was the temporary President in 1971 when Sheikh Mujibur Rahman had been captured by Pakistani's. The college is close to the Old Brahmaputra River, Circuit House & Town Hall.

== Academic progress ==
This college takes the top 20 place in Dhaka Board in every year. It is playing a vital role in the development of national education. The academic discipline and integrity in this college are notable. This college has a strong alumni community.

- In 2010, 282 students achieved GPA 5.00.
- In 2011, 336 students achieved GPA 5.00.
- In 2012, 562 students achieved GPA 5.00.
- In 2013, 444 students achieved GPA 5.00.
- In 2014, 621 students achieved GPA 5.00.
- In 2015, 392 students achieved GPA 5.00.
- In 2016, 468 students achieved GPA 5.00.
- In 2017, 319 students achieved GPA 5.00.
- In 2018, 242 students achieved GPA 5.00.
- In 2019, 325 students achieved GPA 5.00.
- In 2020, 982 students achieved GPA 5.00.
- In 2021, 953 students achieved GPA 5.00.
- In 2022, 837+ students achieved GPA 5.00.

== Notable alumni ==
- Sania Sultana Liza, a renowned singer in Bangladeshi Music Industry. She passed her HSC examination from this college in 2010.

== Gallery ==
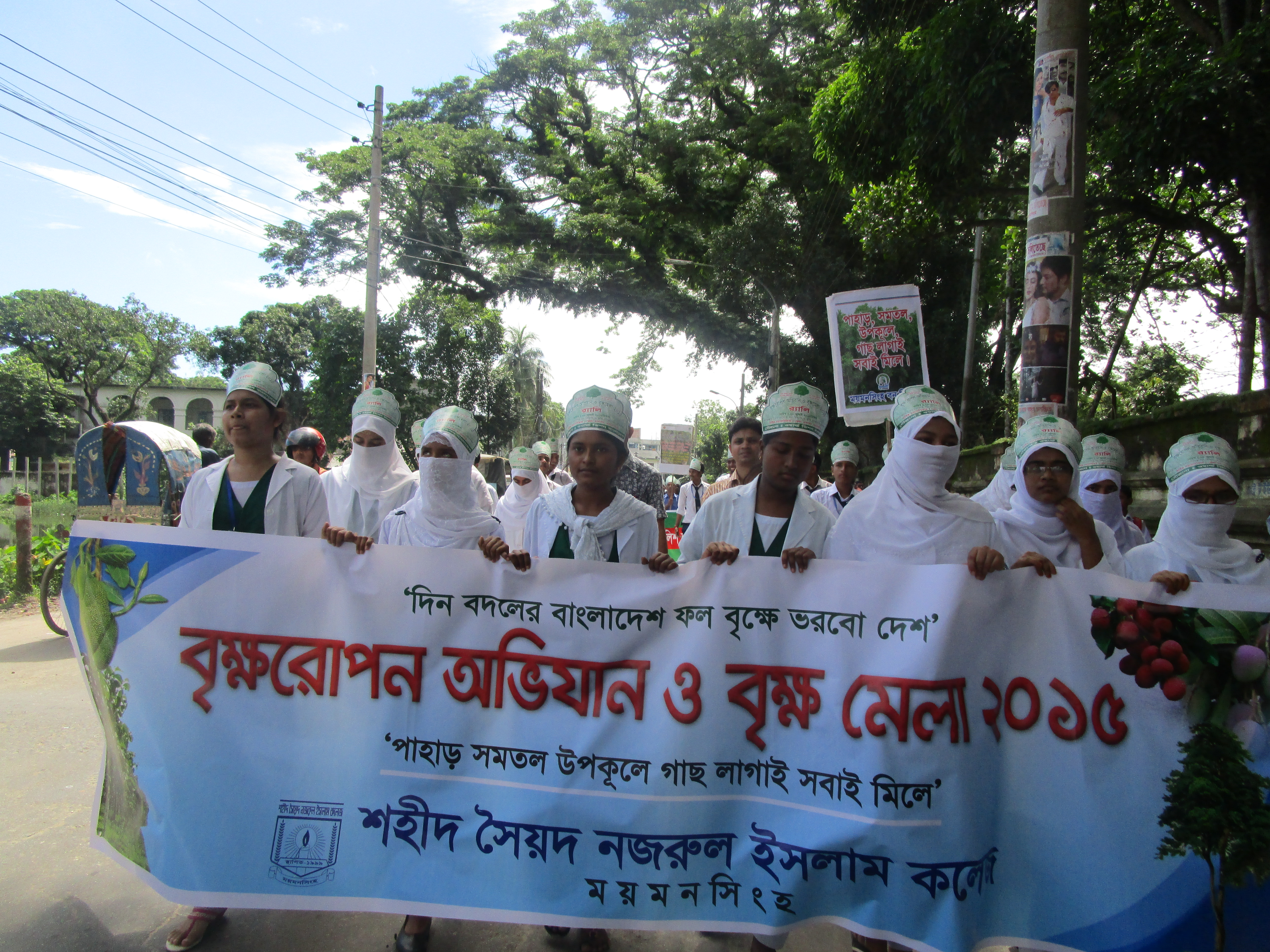
A Rally on Tree planting by the College Students.
