= Dhaka Dental College and Hospital =

Government dental college in Bangladesh

Coordinates: 23.7991°N 90.3879°E

- ঢাকা ডেন্টাল কলেজ ও হাসপাতাল
- Motto: শিক্ষা, শান্তি, সেবা
- Motto in English: Education, Peace, Service
- Type: Government
- Established: 1961
- Founders: Abu Hayder Sajedur Rahman
- Affiliations: Bangladesh Medical University (BMU); Bangladesh College of Physicians and Surgeons (BCPS); Bangladesh Medical and Dental Council (BM&DC); University of Dhaka (DU)
- Principal: Parimal Chandra Mallick
- Academic staff: 200
- Administrative staff: 100
- Students: 600
- Undergraduates: 400
- Postgraduates: 200
- Address: Section 14, Mirpur, Dhaka, 1206, Bangladesh
- Campus: 7 acres
- Language: English
- Website: www.dhakadental.gov.bd

Dhaka Dental College and Hospital, abbreviated DDC, is the largest dental school in Bangladesh. It was the first dental school in East Pakistan and was established in August 1961. It's the only governmental dental college in Bangladesh that oversees a 200-bed hospital in Dhaka.

== Courses ==
The college offers five-year BDS course (under Dhaka University). It also offers MS courses affiliated to Bangabandhu Sheikh Mujib Medical University (BSMMU). Under Bangladesh College of Physicians and Surgeons (BCPS) the FCPS courses are also offered.

=== Undergraduate (BDS) ===
Academic Year	Academic Departments
1st Year	Anatomy with histology; Physiology with Biochemistry; Science of Dental Materials; Dental Anatomy and Physiology
2nd Year	General and Dental Pharmacology; Pathology & Microbiology
3rd Year	Medicine; General Surgery; Periodontology & Oral Pathology
Final Year	Oral and Maxillofacial Surgery; Conservative Dentistry and Endodontics; Prosthodontics; Orthodontics and Dentofacial Orthopedics; Pedodontics and Dental Public Health

=== Postgraduate (FCPS) ===
Departments
Prosthodontics
Orthodontics & Donto-Facial Orthopedics
Conservative Dentistry & Endodontics
Oral & Maxillo-facial Surgery
Pediatric Dentistry
Periodontology & Oral Pathology

=== Postgraduate (MS & FCPS) ===
Departments
Orthodontics & Donto-facial orthopedics
Conservative Dentistry & Endodontics
Oral & Maxillo-facial Surgery

== Facilities ==
The following facilities are in the eight acres (3.2 ha) hospital area:

- Administration building
- Academic building
- Auditorium
- Two lecture galleries
- One hospital building
- Two ladies hostel
- Boys' hostel
- Staff colony
- Teachers colony
- Mosque
- Shaheed minar ('Martyr Monument')
- Another boys' hostel is situated in Sobhanbag, Dhaka

=== Ladies' hostel ===
Two ladies' hostels houses 300 students on campus premises.

=== Boys' hostel (Mirpur) ===
The boys' hostel houses 60 and is for juniors, especially 1st, 2nd and 3rd year students.

=== Boys' hostel (Sobahanbag) ===
This hostel houses 300 and is for 4th year, final year and intern doctors.

=== Academic building ===
The academic building is a five-story building housing seven departments, a library, two clubs, three common rooms, and a canteen. Each department has well-furnished lecture rooms and laboratories.

A new well furnished four-storied building is established in 2024 containing a large auditorium.

=== Library ===
An air-conditioned library hosts 14,000+ medical and dental books along with 122 regular and irregular journals.

=== Hospital building ===
The hospital is the largest dental hospital in Bangladesh with a seven-story building and 200 beds. Facilities allow pathological tests, radiotherapy, OPG, general and dental X-ray services.

== Administration ==
Dhaka dental college has a well-organized administration faculty. A teachers' association runs the college; the principal is the chief, and the teachers are members. The administration office is combined with the principal and vice-principal, secretary, student's section, and accountant's offices.

== Dental chairs ==
Department	Number of dental chairs
Periodontology & Oral Pathology	19 chairs
Pediatric Dentistry	17 chairs
Casualty (Oral & Maxillo-Facial Surgery)	6 chairs
Minor OT (Oral & Maxillo-Facial Surgery)	4 chairs
Prosthodontics	5 chairs
Orthodontics & Donto-facial Orthopedics	13 chairs
Conservative Dentistry & Endodontics	35 chairs

=== Hospital beds ===
Department	Number of beds
Medicine	40 beds
Surgery	37 beds
Cabin	7 beds
OMS (Male)	40 beds
OMS (Female)	40 beds
OMS (Children)	16 beds

=== OT facilities ===
- Oral & Maxillo-Facial Surgery Department
- General Surgery Department

== Transport ==
A BRTC AC college bus is available for students.

== Extracurricular activities ==
Cultural programs and competitions occur throughout the year such as sports and cultural week & Debating club, Ucchash, Shondhani.

== Gallery ==
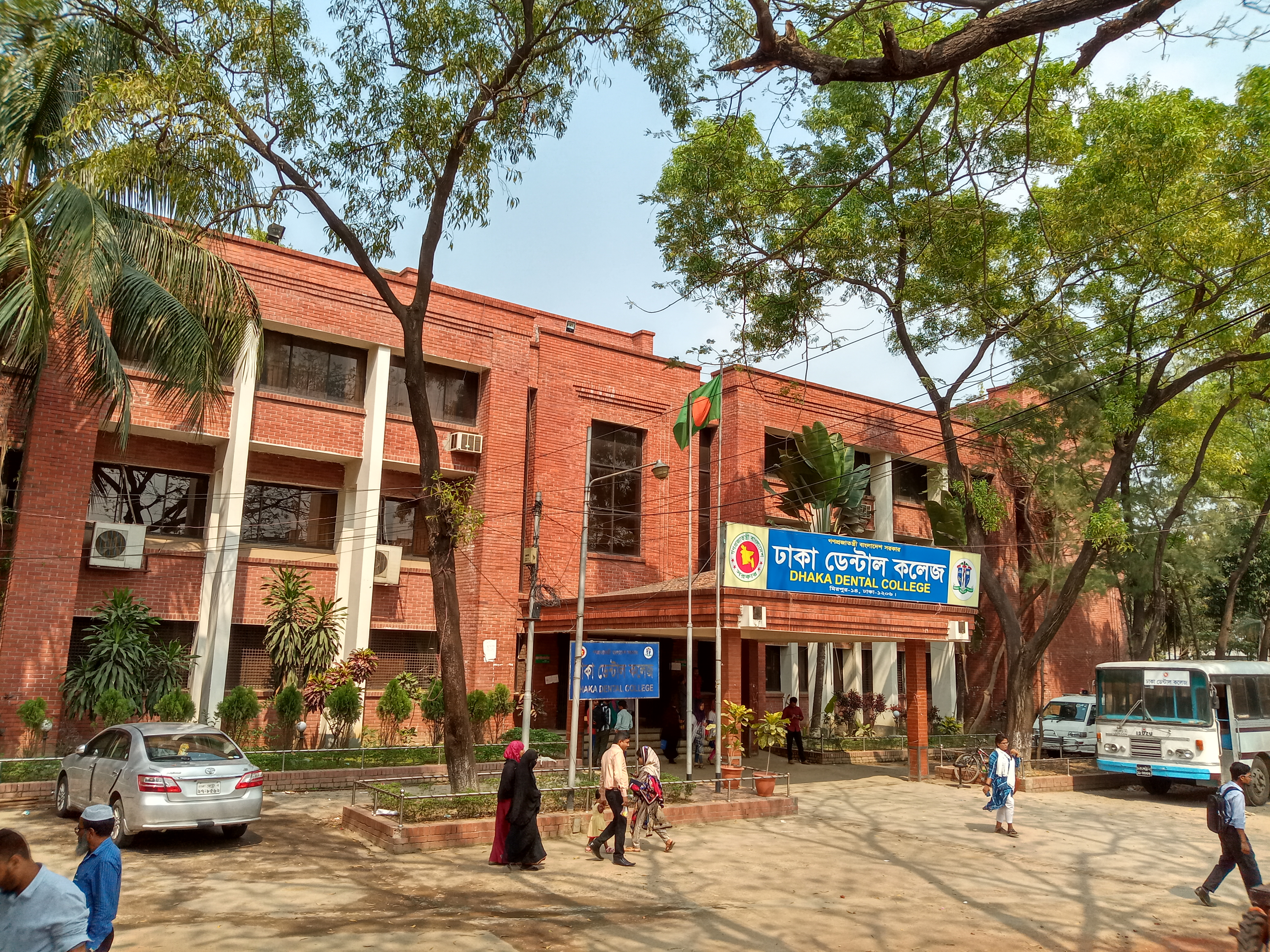

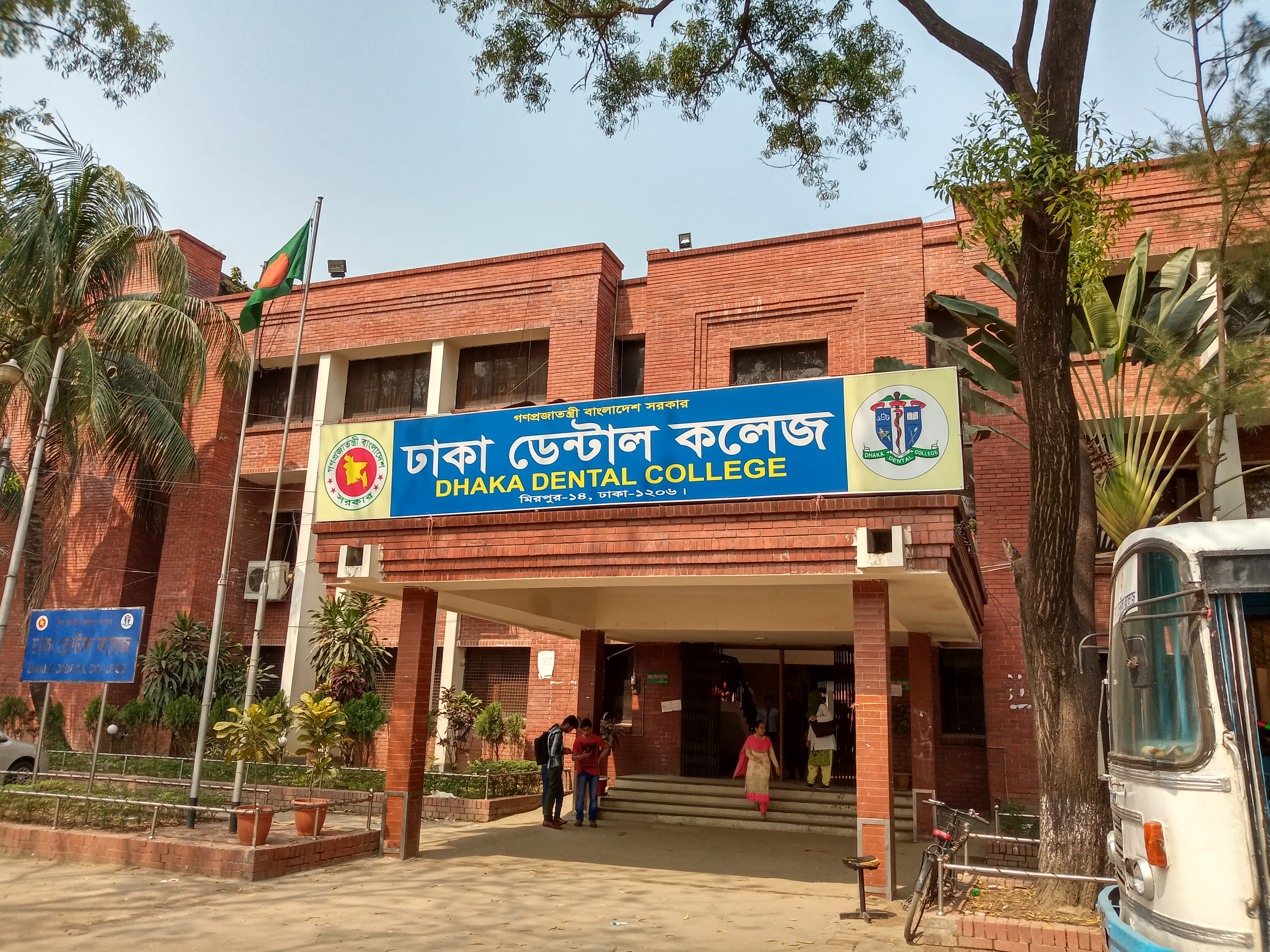
