= Khulna Division =

Division of Bangladesh

Khulna Division খুলনা বিভাগ
- Division of Bangladesh
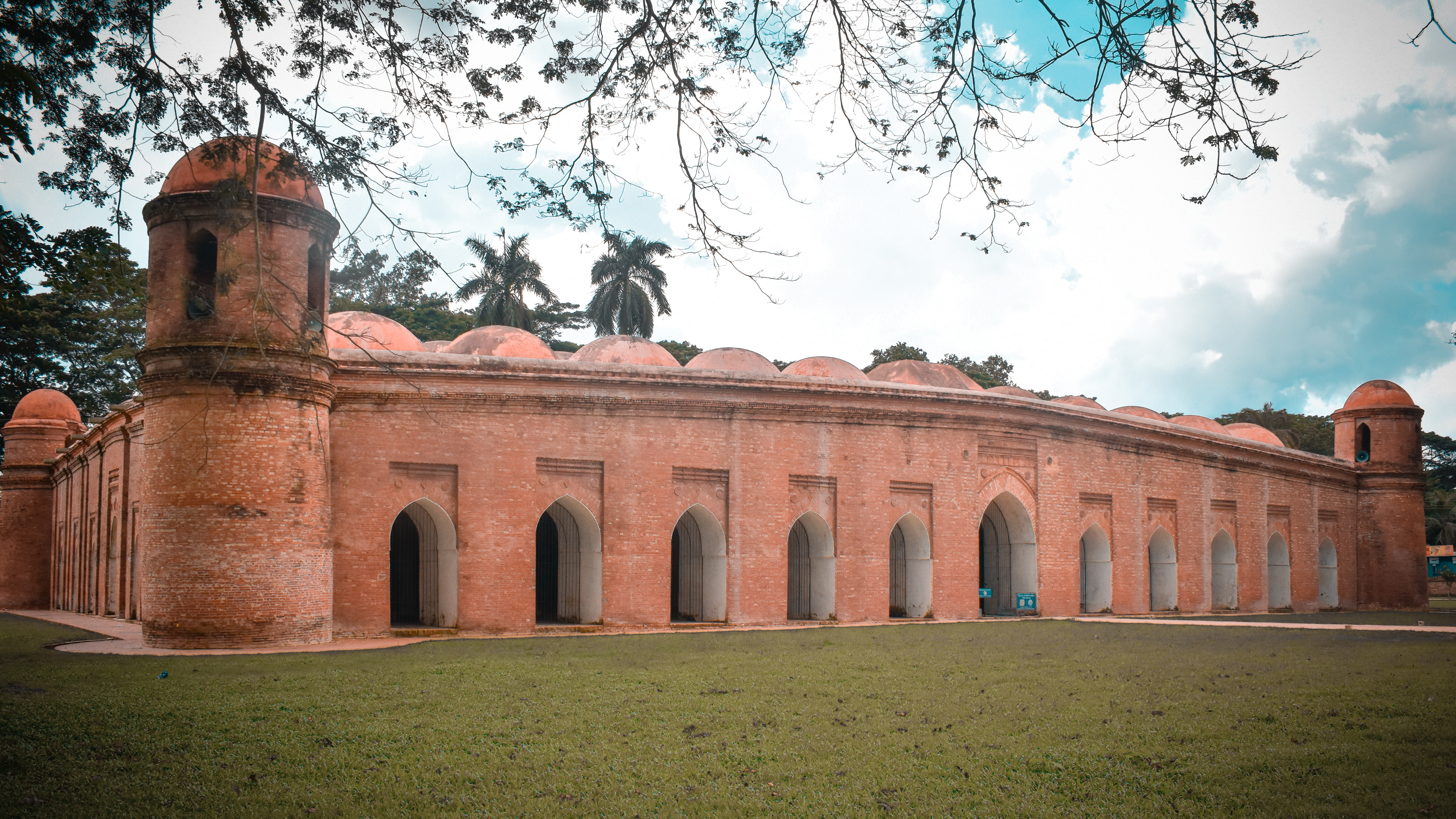
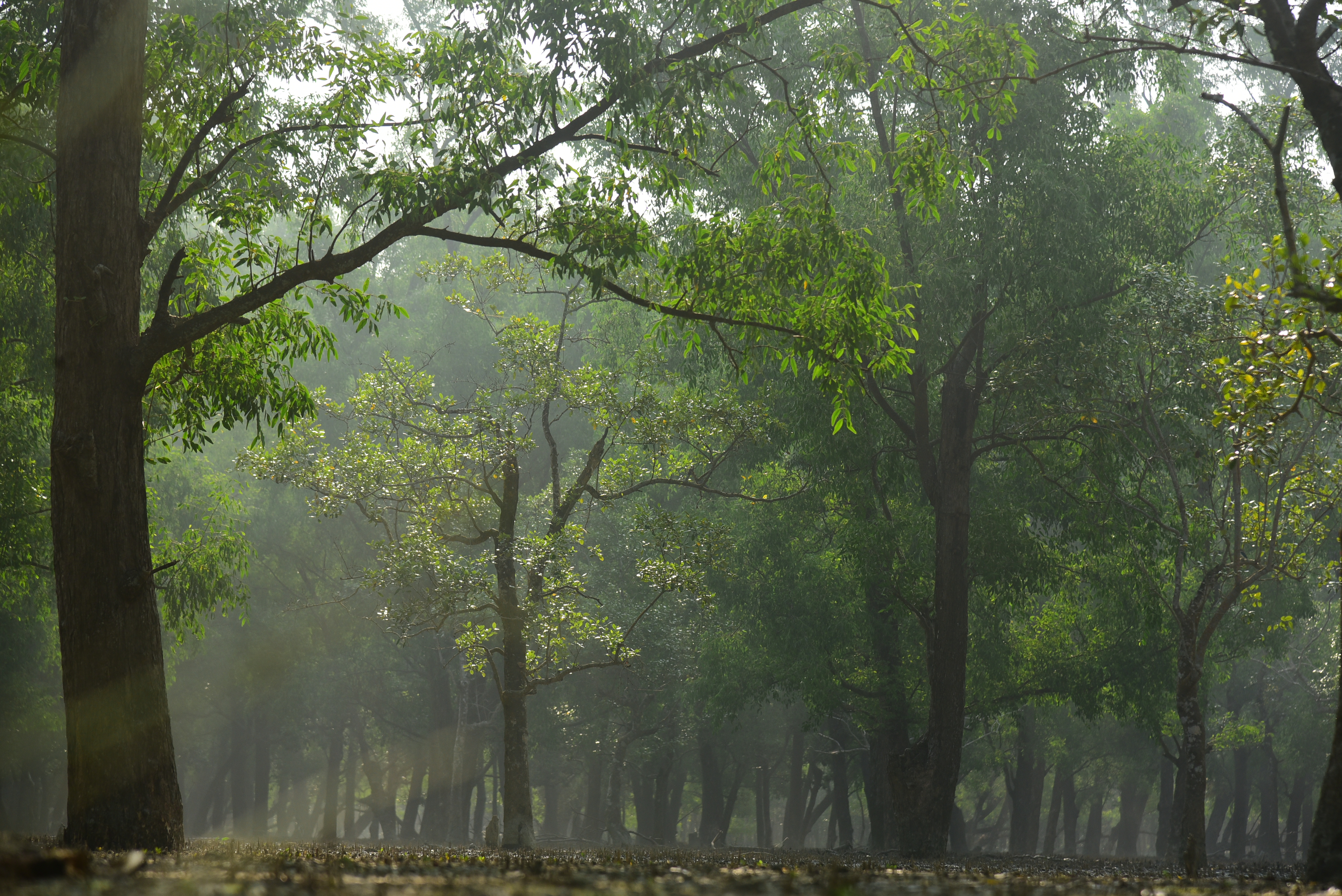
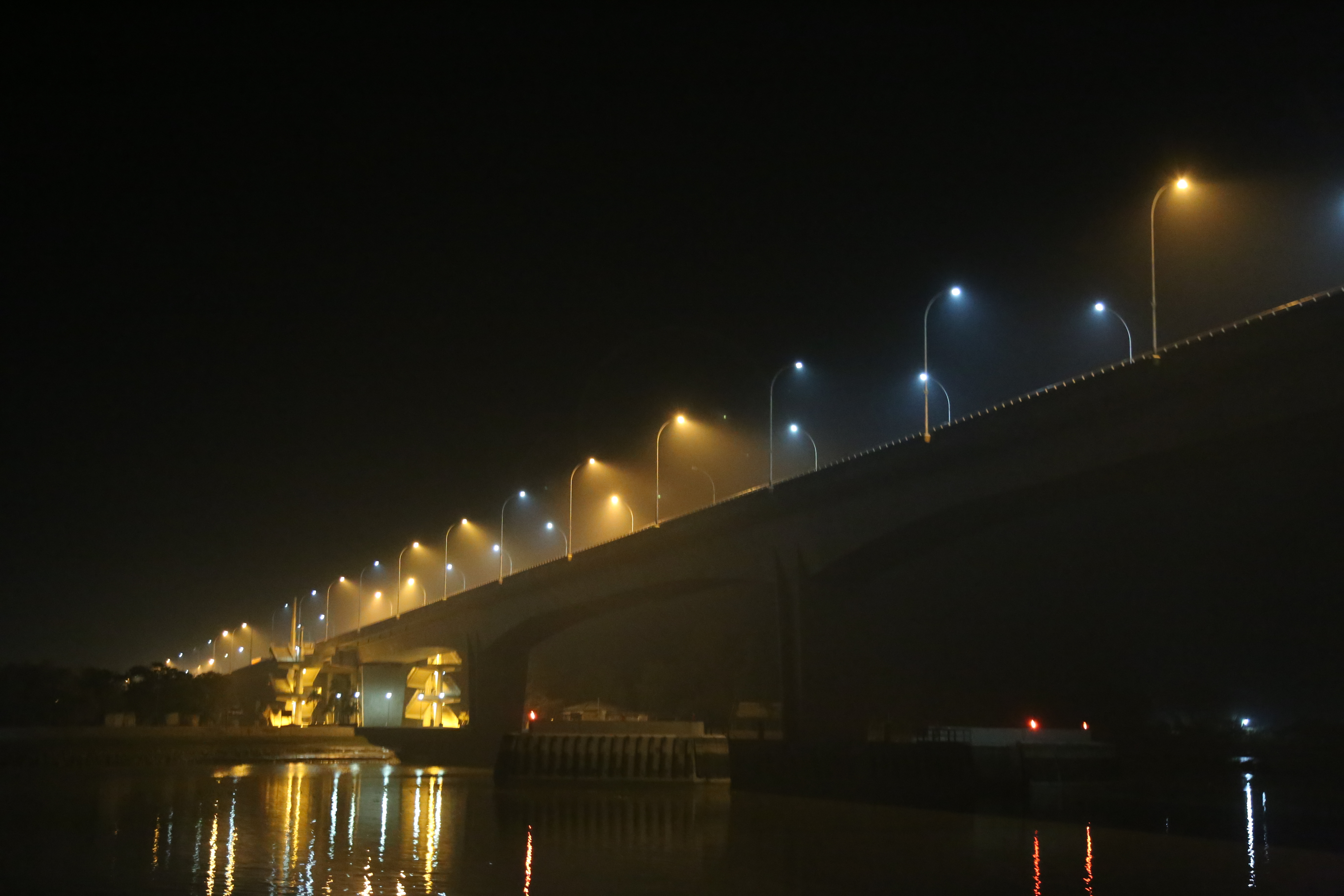
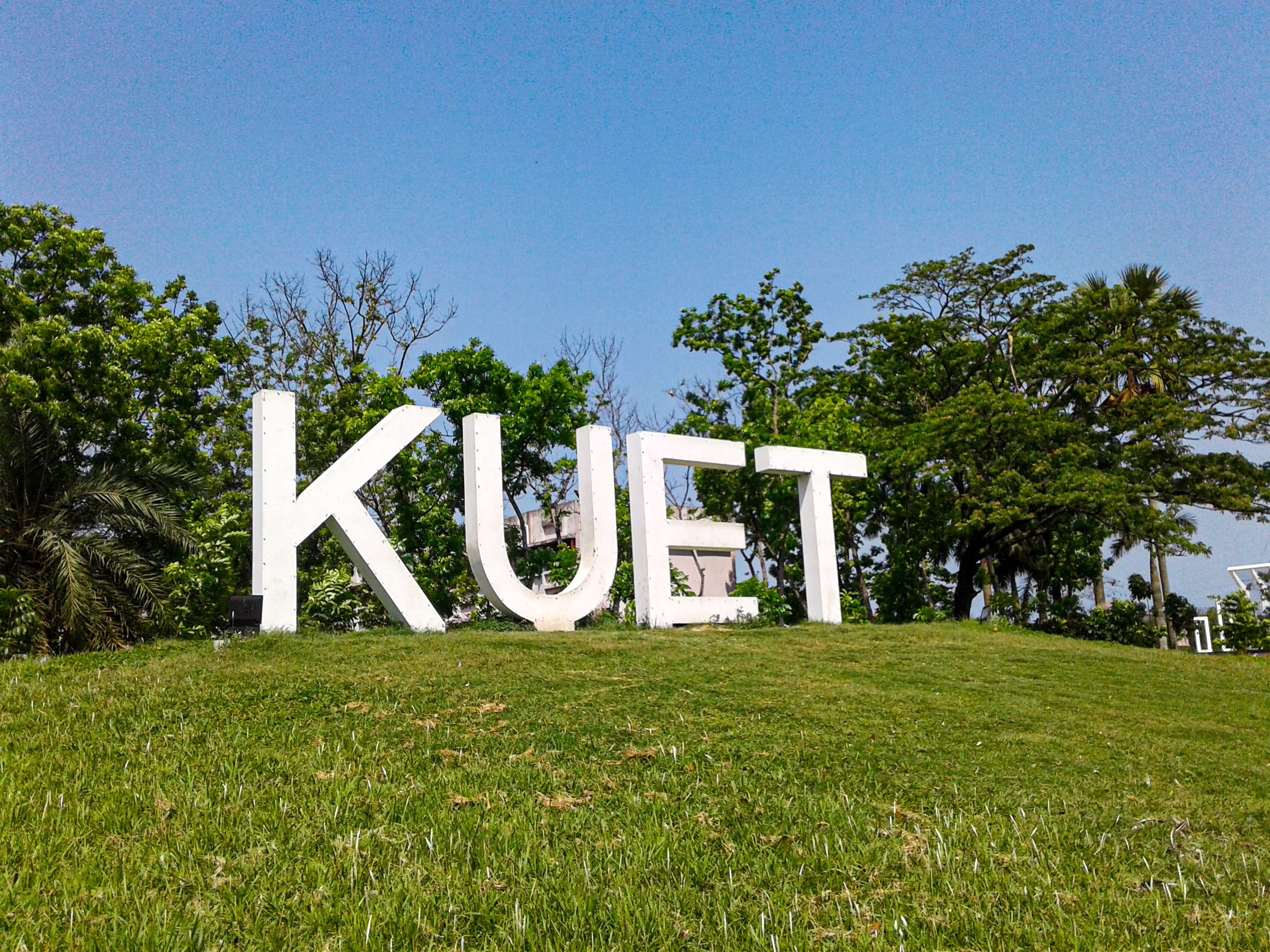
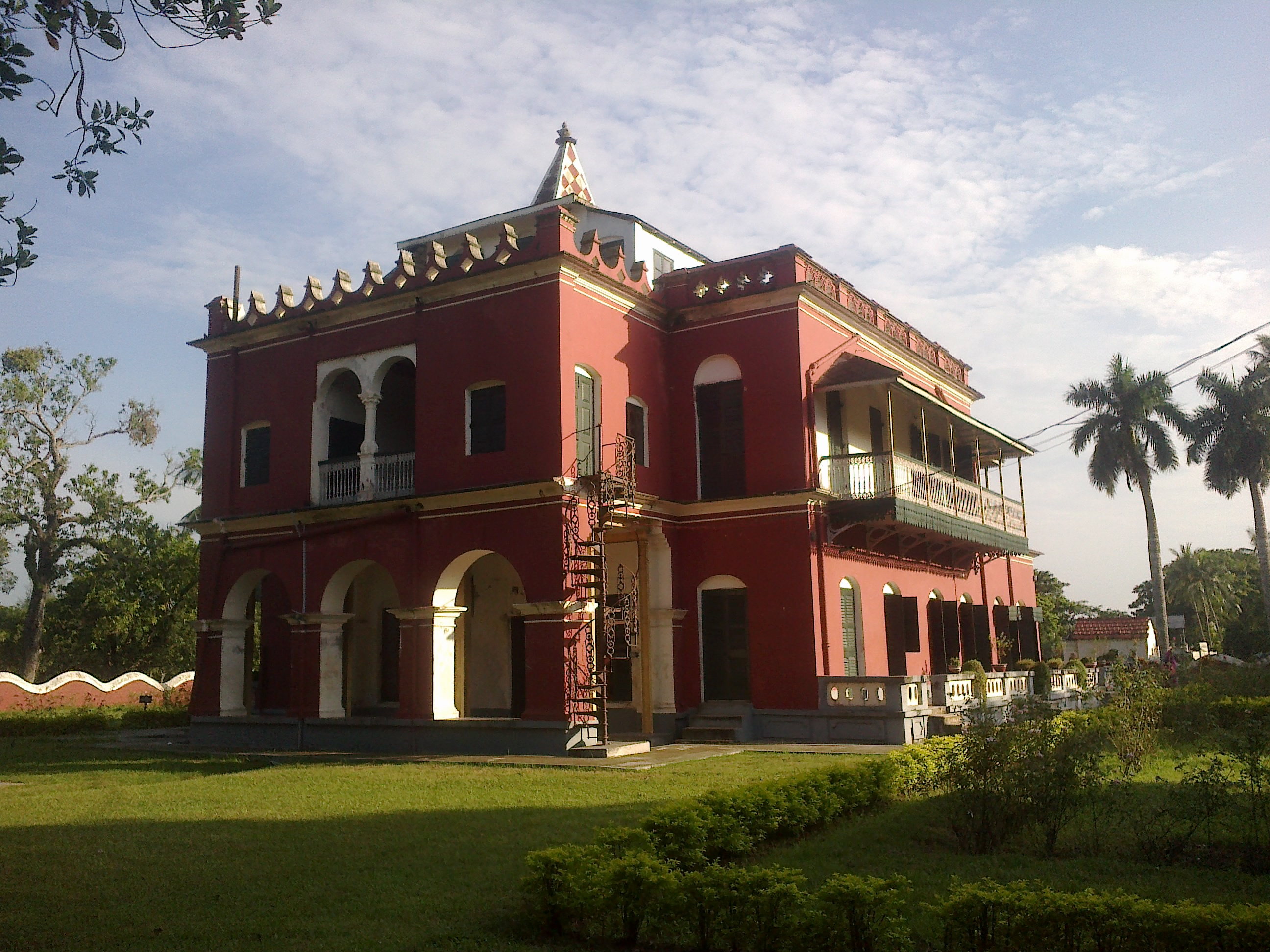
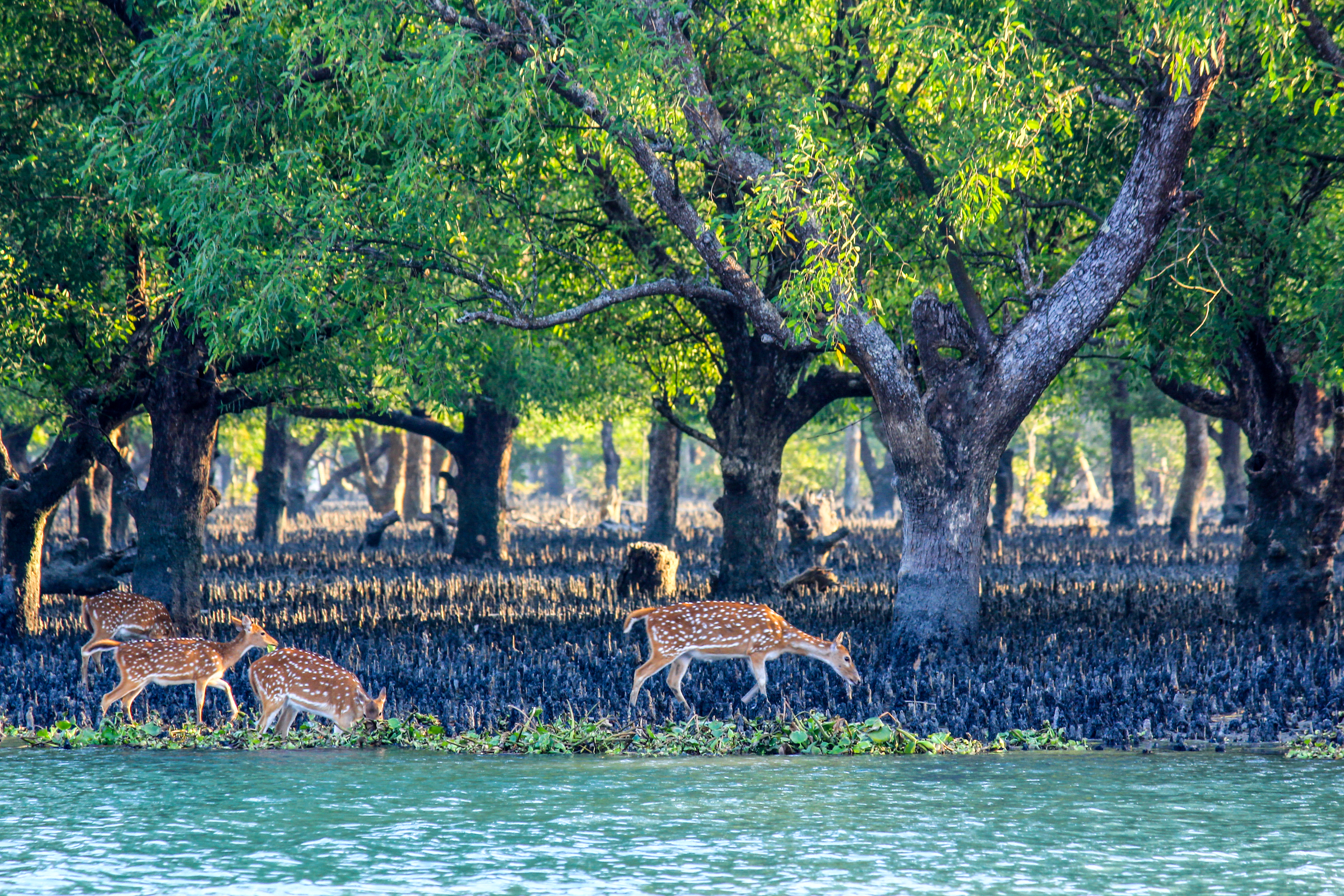
- Clockwise from the top: Sixty Dome Mosque, Khan Jahan Ali Bridge, Shilaidaha Kuthibadi, Sundarbans, KUET and Hiron Point within Sundarbans
- Nickname: Gateway to the Sundarbans
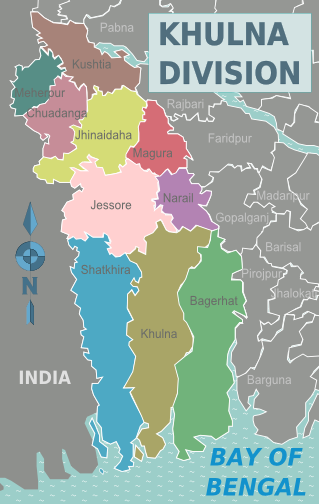
- Coordinates: 22°55′N 89°15′E
- Country: Bangladesh
- Established: 1960
- Capital and largest city: Khulna

Government
  - Divisional Commissioner: Md. Abdullah Harun
  - Parliamentary constituency: Jatiya Sangsad (36 seats)

Area
  - Division of Bangladesh: 22,284.22 km^{2} (8,603.99 sq mi)

Population (2022)
  - Division of Bangladesh: 17,415,924 (Enumerated)
  - Density: 781/km^{2} (2,020/sq mi)
  - Urban: 4,312,418
  - Rural: 13,102,183
  - Metro: 719,465
  - Adjusted Population: 17,813,218

Languages
  - Official language: Bengali
  - Indigenous minority languages: List: Rakhine; Santali
- Time zone: UTC+6 (Bangladesh Standard Time)
- ISO 3166 code: BD-D
- HDI (2018): 0.641 medium
- Notable sport teams: Khulna Tigers, Khulna Division
- Website: khulna.gov.bd

Khulna Division (Bengali: খুলনা বিভাগ) is the second largest of the eight divisions of Bangladesh. It has an area of 22,285 km^{2} (8,604 sq mi) and a population of 17,416,645 at the 2022 Bangladesh census (preliminary returns). Its headquarters and largest city is Khulna city in Khulna District.

== History ==
During the British Raj era, Khulna Division was part of the Presidency Division. Before 1947, the Presidency division included six major districts: Murshidabad, Calcutta, 24 Parganas, Khulna, undivided Jessore, and undivided Nadia. In 1947, The Partition of India divided this division into two. The district of Khulna and the other half of Jessore District and Nadia District became part of the newly established East Bengal. And rest of the district of the presidential division became part of West Bengal. In 1948, Nadia district of East Bengal formed a new district called Kushtia. And the government of East Bengal added the Jessore, Khulna & Kushtia district into the Rajshahi Division. In 1960, the government of East Pakistan decided that these three districts from the Rajshahi Division and one district from the Dacca Division would create a division called Khulna. In 1993, the Barisal Division was formed from the Khulna division.

== Geography ==
The Khulna division borders the indian state of West Bengal to the west, the Rajshahi Division to the north, the Dhaka division to the northeast and the Barisal division to the southeast. It also has a coastline on the Bay of Bengal to the south. It is part of the Ganges River delta or Greater Bengal Delta. Other rivers include the Madhumati River, the Bhairab River and the Kapotaksha River. The region also includes several islands in the Bay of Bengal.

The Sundarbans, the world's largest mangrove forest, is in the southern part of the division.

Khulna city is in the northern part of the district, and the Mayur River is the western boundary of the metropolitan area.

== Administrative districts ==
The division was formed in 1960. Khulna Division consists of the following ten districts (zilas), subdivided into 59 sub-districts (upazilas):

District	Map	Est.	Area (km^{2})	Population (2022)	Density (/km^{2})	Seats in Parlament	No. of Upazila
Jashore	Jashore District	1781	2,607	3,076,144	1,200	6	8
Khulna	Khulna District	1882	4,394	2,613,385	595	6	9
Kushtia	Kushtia District	1947	1,609	2,149,692	1,336	4	6
Satkhira	Satkhira District	1984	3,817	2,196,581	574	4	7
Jhenaidah	Jhenaidah District	1984	1,965	1,771,304	902	4	6
Bagerhat	Bagerhat District	1984	3,959	1,613,079	407	3	9
Chuadanga	Chuadanga District	1984	1,174	1,234,066	1,051	2	4
Magura	Magura District	1984	1,039	1,033,115	994	2	4
Narail	Narail District	1984	968	788,673	815	2	3
Meherpur	Meherpur District	1984	742	705,356	951	2	3
Total			22,284	17,415,924	781	36	59

== Demographics ==
Religion in Khulna division (2022)
Religion	Percent
Muslims	88.21%
Hindus	11.53%
Christians	0.24%
Others	0.02%

Muslims are the predominant religion with 88.21%, while Hindus are the main minority with 11.53% population. Christians and others are 0.24% and 0.02% respectively.

== Economy ==
Majority of the largest mangrove forest in the world — the Sundarban — is spread across the three most southerly districts of Satkhira, Khulna and Bagherhat. Khulna's GDP is the third-largest GDP behind Dhaka and Chittagong. It possesses a GDP of $53 billion.

== Education ==
The division contains educational institutions including

=== Universities ===
Public Universities

- Khulna University
- Khulna University of Engineering and Technology
- Khulna Agricultural University
- Khulna Medical University
- Jashore University of Science and Technology
- Islamic University, Bangladesh
- Meherpur University

Private Universities

- North Western University, Bangladesh
- Northern University of Business and Technology Khulna
- Rabindra Maitree University, Kushtia
- Lalon Science and Arts University, Kushtia
- First Capital University of Bangladesh, Chuadanga.
- Khan Bahadul Ahsanullah University, Khulna

=== Medical Colleges ===
Public

- Khulna Medical College
- Kushtia Medical College
- Jashore Medical College
- Satkhira Medical College
- Magura Medical College
- Army Medical College, Jashore

Private

- Khulna City Medical College Hospital
- Gazi Medical College
- Ad-Din Akij Medical College hospital, Khulna
- Khulna Homeopathic Medical College
- Ad-Din Sakina Medical College & Hospital, Jashore
- Selima Medical College & Hospital, Kushtia

=== Colleges ===
- Khulna Public College
- Khulna Govt. College
- Ahsanullah College, Khulna
- Kushtia Government College
- Khulna Collectorate Public School & College
- Kushtia Government Central College
- Kushtia Government Womens College
- Police Lines School and College, Kushtia
- Khulna Govt. Model School and college, Khulna
- Kushtia Islamia College,
- Kumarkhali Govt. College, Kushtia
- Govt. Bangabandhu College, Rupsha, Khulna
- Bheramara Govt. College, Kushtia
- Bheramara Govt. Womens College, Kushtia
- Chuadanga Govt College-Chuadanga
- Government B L College, Khulna
- Jhenaidah Cadet College
- Majid Memorial City College, Khulna
- Cantonment College, Jashore
- Azam Khan Govt. Commerce College, Khulna
- BN School & College, Khulna
- Govt. H.S.S College, Magura
- Michael Modhushudon College, Jashore
- Govt. Pioneer Woman's College, Khulna
- Khulna Govt. Girls College
- Govt. Sundarban Adarsha College, Khulna.
- Govt. K.C. College, Jhenaidah
- Government P.C. College, Bagerhat
- Daulatpur College (Day/Night), Daulatpur, Khulna
- Govt. Keshabpur College, Keshabpur, Jashore
- Khan Jahan Ali Ideal College
- Chuknagor College, Dumuria, Khulna
- Dr. Abdur Razzak Municipal College
- BAF Shaheen College, Jashore
- Jashore Govt. City College
- Dawood Public School, Jashore
- Adarsha Degree College, Magura
- Sreepur Degree College, Magura

=== Polytechnic institutes ===
- Khulna Polytechnic Institute
- Jashore Polytechnic Institute
- City Polytechnic Institute, Khulna
- Mangrove Institute of Science and Technology
- North South Polytechnic Institute Khulna
- Jhenaidah Polytechnic Institute
- Khanjahan Ali college of Engineering and Technology
- BCMC College of Engineering & Technology
- Khulna Mohila Polytechnic Institute
- Kushtia Polytechnic Institute
- Satkhira Polytechnic Institute
- Magura Polytechnic Institute

=== Schools ===
- V J Govt High School, Chuadanga
- Chuadanga Govt Girls' High School-Chuadanga
- Govt. Coronation Girls' High School-khulna
- Islamabad Collegiate School
- Government Naldanga Bhushan Pilot Secondary School, Jhenaidah
- Dighalia M.A. Majid Secondary School, Khulna
- Jashore Zilla School
- Khulna Zilla School
- Kushtia Zilla School
- Fatima Girls High School, Khulna
- Jashore Cantonment Public School
- Keshabpur Govt. Pilot Higher Secondary School, Jashore
- Khulna Collegiate Girls School
- Khulna Engineering University School
- Khulna Lions Schools
- Adarsho Girls' School, Keshabpur, Jashore
- Sagardari Michael Madhusadan Institution, Keshabpur, Jashore
- Kumira High School
- M.M. High School
- Mangolkot M.L High School, Keshabpur, Jashore
- Rev. Paul High School
- Rosedale International School
- Rotary School, Khalishpur, Khulna
- S.B.S.N, Damoder
- St. Joseph's High School, Khulna
- St. Xavier's High School, Khulna
- Udayan Khulna Zilla Police School
- Manirampur Government High School

=== Other educational institutes ===
Khulna has six integrated general and vocational (IGV) schools and one technical school of UCEP (Underprivileged Children's Educational Programs), which is a non-profitable organization.

- UCEP Mohsin Khulna TVET Institute, Baikali, Khulna
- UCEP Mohsin Khulna Technical School, Baikali,
- UCEP Sonadanga Technical School, Sonadanga
- UCEP M.A Majid Technical School, Fulbarigate
- UCEP Khalishpur Technical School, Khalishpur
- UCEP Johara Samad Technical School, Tootpara
- UCEP Wazed Ali Technical School, Banorgati

== Transportation ==
Khulna Division has a high transportation link with other areas in Bangladesh as well as with India by Road, Rail, Air and Waterways

=== Road ===
The national highway (N7) cross through Khulna Division which connects Dhaka to the Port of Mongla. The AH1 and AH41 also Cross through Khulna division. It also connects with India by the Landports of Benapole, Darshana, Mujibnogor, and Bhomra through various Road links.

=== Rail ===
There are several railway routes in Khulna Division which connects various cities and areas of Bangladesh. It also has 2 international routes to India which connects by train.

=== Air ===
There are two airports in Khulna Division. One of them is functional and one is under construction. The Jashore Airport is a functional airport in Khulna Division which connects to Dhaka, Chattogram and Cox's Bazar by air and the Khan Jahan Ali International Airport is still under construction.

=== Waterways ===
Port of Khulna, Port of Kushtia, Port of Noapara are the main three river ports in Khulna division. Every day various ship are leaving from these ports to various parts of Bangladesh.

Port of Mongla is the only sea port in Khulna division.

== Newspapers and magazines ==
Daily and weekly newspapers are published from Khulna Division, including:

- Anirbhan
- Janmobhumi
- Khulna News
- Lok Samaj
- Probaho
- Purbanchal
- satkhiranews.com
- The Daily Gramer Kagoj
- The Daily Spandan
- Tribune
- Daily Mathabhanga

== Points of interest ==
Sixty Dome Mosque — Situated in the suburbs of Bagerhat Sadar Upazila, at the meeting-point of the Ganges and Brahmaputra rivers, this ancient city, formerly known as Khalifatabad, was founded by the Turkish general Ulugh Khan Jahan in the 15th century. The city's infrastructure reveals considerable technical skill and an exceptional number of mosques and early Islamic monuments, many built of brick, can be seen there.

The Sundarbans mangrove forest, one of the largest such forests in the world (140,000 ha), lies on the delta of the Ganges, Brahmaputra and Meghna rivers on the Bay of Bengal. It is adjacent to the border of India's Sundarbans World Heritage site inscribed in 1987. The site is intersected by a complex network of tidal waterways, mudflats and small islands of salt-tolerant mangrove forests, and presents an excellent example of ongoing ecological processes. The area is known for its wide range of fauna, including 260 bird species, the Bengal tiger and other threatened species such as the estuarine crocodile and the Indian python.

Mobarakganj Sugar Mills Limited is a prominent sugar manufacturing company located in Mobarakganj, Jhenaidah. Established with the goal of supporting the agricultural sector and contributing to the national economy, the company produces high-quality sugar and related by-products.

Shilaidaha Kuthibadi is a place in Kumarkhali Upazila of Kushtia District in Bangladesh. The place is famous for Kuthi Bari; a country house made by Dwarkanath Tagore. Rabindranath Tagore lived a part of his life here and created some of his memorable poems while living here.

1971: Genocide-Torture Archive & Museum - Rare pictures and paintings depicting the genocide of Bangladeshis by the Pakistan army hang on the wall. There is also a rich collection of books and audio-visual materials on the ruthless massacre against the unarmed people. The aim of the museum is to educate people, especially youths, about the genocide committed by the Pakistan army in association with their local collaborators, said Prof Muntassir Mamoon, chairman of the trustee board that runs the institution.

== Notable residents ==
- Khan Jahan Ali, saint
- Fakir Lalon Shah, Baul legend
- Prafulla Chandra Ray - Acharya and scholar of University of Dhaka
- Michael Madhusudan Datta, poet and dramatist
- Amir Hamza, poet and fighter
- SM Sultan, artist
- Nilima Ibrahim, educationist, littérateur and social worker
- Firoz Mahmud, contemporary visual artist and painter
- Mohammad Lutfur Rahman, author
- Tanvir Mokammel, filmmaker and writer
- Pramatha Chaudhuri, essayist, poet, author and editor
- Farrukh Ahmad, poet and editor
- Qazi Imdadul Haq, writer
- Nur Mohammad Sheikh, EPR member, Bir Sreshtho recipient
- Sheikh Abu Naser, politician
- Sharif Khasruzzaman - politician (Narail), fighter and commander during the Bangladesh War of Independence
- Abdul Hyee, politician, fighter and commander during the Bangladesh War of Independence
- SM Shafiuddin Ahmed - 17th Chief of Army Staff (CAS) of Bangladesh Army
- Mashrafe Mortaza - cricketer and member of parliament (Narail-2)
- Bishnu Chattopadhyay, fighter and leader of peasant movement
- Dr. Jamal Nazrul Islam, physicist
- Ahmed Ali Enayetpuri, Islamic scholar and Member of the Bengal Legislative Assembly
- Syed Ali Ahsan, poet
- Sheikh Mohammad Aslam, footballer
- Mahmudul Haque Liton, footballer
- Mamun Joarder, footballer
- Dastagir Hossain Nira, footballer
- Shakib Al Hasan, cricketer
- Rubel Hossain, cricketer
- Manjural Islam Rana, cricketer
- Dinesh Chandra Chattopadhyay, writer and editor
- Suvra Mukherjee, former first lady of India, wife of President Pranab Mukherjee
- Bobita, actress
- Haridasa Thakur, Vaisnava Saint, acarya of the Holy Name.
- Muhammad Sohrab Hossain, government minister
- Soumya Sarkar, cricketer
- Imrul Kayes, cricketer
- Habibul Bashar, cricketer
- Mustafizur Rahman, cricketer
- Abdur Razzak (cricketer), cricketer
- Mohammad Manjural Islam, cricketer
- Sheikh Salahuddin, cricketer and coach (BCB Academy)
- Syed Rasel, cricketer
- S. I. Tutul, singer
- Munshi Mohammad Meherullah, Muslim poet, religious leader
- Gangadhar Sen Roy, Ayurveda physician
- Sheikh Razzak Ali, lawyer, politician, Deputy Speaker and Speaker of Jatiya Sangsad
- Salma Khatun, cricketer
- Jahanara Alam, cricketer
- Rumana Ahmed, cricketer
- Mehedi Hasan (Miraz), cricketer
- Puja Cherry Roy, actress
- Afif Hossain, cricketer
- Nurul Hasan Sohan, cricketer
- Shukhtara Rahman, cricketer
- Tahin Tahera, cricketer
- Shaila Sharmin, cricketer
- Ziaur Rahman, cricketer
- Radhabinod Pal, jurist, dissenting judge at the Tokyo Trials
- Abdul Hakeem (speaker), former speaker of the East Bengal Legislative Assembly
- Hamidur Rahman, national hero, a sepoy in the Bangladesh Army during the Bangladesh Liberation War

== See also ==
- Water supply and sanitation in Bangladesh
