= Fine Arts School, Khulna University =

School of Fine arts,Khulna University

School of Fine Arts, University of Khulna
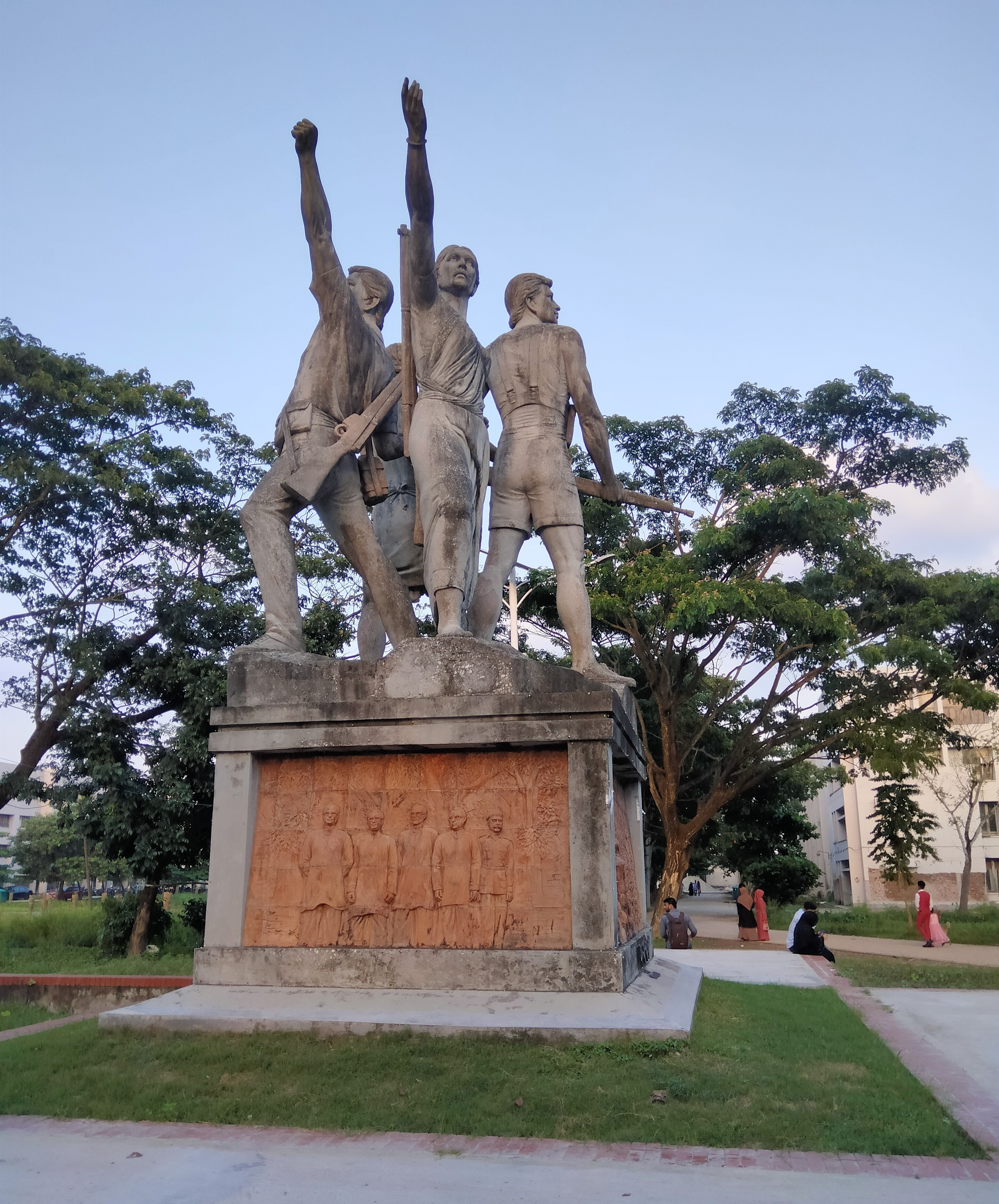
- Adamya Bangla, a sculpture made by the Fine Arts School
- Parent institution: Khulna University
- Founder: Shashibhusan Pal
- Established: 1904; 122 years ago: Khulna Arts School . 1983: Shashibhusan College of Arts. 1990: Khulna Fine Arts. College; 2009; 17 years ago: School of Fine Arts of Khulna University.
- Dean: Nihar Ronjon Singha
- Address: School of Fine Arts, Khulna University, Sher E Bangla Road, Khulna
- Location: Khulna, Bangladesh
- Coordinates: 22.802°N 89.533°E
- Interactive map of School of Fine Arts, University of Khulna
- Website: https://ku.ac.bd/office/dean/fa

The School of Fine Arts (FAS) (Bengali: চারুকলা স্কুল) is a school of the Khulna University. It was established in 1904 as the Khulna Art School. It is the second oldest fine arts school in Bengal Presidency after Culcutta Arts College and the oldest fine arts school in East Bengal now (Bangladesh).

== History ==
Khulna Art School was established by Rai Bahadur Shashibhushan Pal in a house made with the Nipa Palm leaves of his house in Maheshwarpasha, Khulna city in 1904. It was the second art school in undivided Bengal after the Calcutta Art School and the first art school in East Bengal at that time.

Later, Khulna Art School became known as 'Maheshwarpasha School of Art'. But the official name remain the same. In 1983 the school shifted to Boyra area of Khulna city from Maheswarpasha . And the school upgraded as a college and renamed Shashibhusan College of Arts.

In 1990 the College renamed again as Khulna College of Arts. Finally the college became a constitutional institute of Khulna University in 2009 as Institute of Fine Arts of the Khulna University. Later it become an independent school of Khulna University and the institute shifted to Khulna University campus from Boyra in 2013. Now the institute is known as School of Fine Arts, Khulna University.

== Academic ==
School of Fine Arts offers a four-year undergraduate course leading to the bachelor's degree of Fine Arts (BFA). At present, there are three disciplines:

- Drawing and Painting (DP) Discipline
- Print-Making Discipline
- Sculpture Discipline

== See also ==
- Culcutta Arts College
- Faculty of Fine Arts, University of Dhaka
- Faculty of Fine Arts, University of Rajshahi
- Institute of Fine Arts, University of Chittagong
