= Khulna University =

Public University in Khulna

- খুলনা বিশ্ববিদ্যালয়
- Other name: KU
- Motto: Learn, Lead and Live
- Type: Public
- Established: 31 August 1991 (35 years ago)
- Accreditation: Association of Commonwealth Universities (ACU); Institution of Engineers, Bangladesh
- Affiliations: UGC; PCB
- Chancellor: President Mirza Fakhrul Islam Alamgir
- Vice-Chancellor: Md. Rezaul Karim
- Pro Vice-Chancellor: Professor Md. Harunor Rashid Khan
- Faculty: 443
- Administrative staff: 601
- Students: 9,265
- Undergraduates: 7,500
- Postgraduates: 1,200
- Doctoral students: 120
- Other students: 445
- Location: Sher E Bangla Road, Gollamari, Khulna, 9208, Bangladesh; 22.802°N 89.533°E
- Campus: Urban, 106 acres (43 ha)
- Language: English, Bengali
- Colors: Brown and sky blue
- Mascot: Deer 🦌
- Website: www.ku.ac.bd

University rankings

Global – Overall
- QS World: 1401+ (2026)
- THE World: 1201-1500 (2026)

Global – Science and engineering
- THE Engineering: 801-1000 (2025)
- THE Physical Sciences: 1001+ (2025)

Regional – Overall
- QS Asia: 454 (2026)

Khulna University (Bengali: খুলনা বিশ্ববিদ্যালয়) is a public research university at Gollamari in Khulna, Bangladesh. It was established in 1991. The university campus is near the river Moyur, on the Sher E Bangla Road (Khulna-Satkhira highway).

The academic programs of Khulna University started on 31 August 1991 with 80 students in four disciplines. As of 2023, the university has 29 disciplines under eight schools.

== History ==
In 1974, the Kudrat-e-Khuda Commission stated the importance of establishing a public university in Khulna Division in its final report. The government finalized the programme of establishing a university at Khulna on 4 January 1987 and the Khulna University Act was passed in the Bangladesh National Parliament in July 1990. Distinctive law named খুলনা বিশ্ববিদ্যালয় আইন (The Khulna University Act, 1990) passed in the parliament empowers the university. The university started its formal inauguration of academic activities on 25 November 1991.

=== Timeline ===
Academic Building 1

- 1974: The importance of establishing a university in Khulna Division was first mentioned in the report of Kudrat-e-Khuda Commission.
- 1979: (November) The Cabinet of Ministers took the decision for establishing a technical university. The local people demanded a general university.
- 1985: The government formed two committees: Zillur Rahman Siddiqui Committee (for preparing academic and administrative programmes) and Mahbubuzzaman Committee (for the selection of site).
- 1987: (4 January) The government finalized the programme of establishing a university at Khulna on the basis of the reports of the above committees.
- 1988: (25 February) Nurul Islam, the then Divisional Commissioner, was appointed the Project Director for establishing the university.
- 1988: (2 August) Abdur Rahim, the then divisional commissioner, was appointed the project director. After him Md. Abdul Bari served as project director.
- 1989: (9 March) the then President Hussain Muhammad Ershad laid the foundation stone.
- 1989: (1 August) Golam Rahman of Bangladesh University of Engineering and Technology (BUET) was appointed the project director.
- 1990: (June) The Khulna University Act 1990 was passed in Jatiyo Sangsad.
- 1990: (31 July) The Khulna University Act 1990 was published in gazette form.
- 1991: (August) Project director Golam Rahman was appointed the first vice-chancellor.
- 1991: (3 August) First orientation was held.
- 1991: (31 August) The academic programme of the university started.
- 1991: (25 November) The academic programme was formally inaugurated by the then Prime Minister Begum Khaleda Zia.
- 1993: (23 August) Golam Ali Fakir of Bangladesh Agricultural University (BAU) was appointed the second Vice-Chancellor.
- 1997: (10 April) The first convocation was held.
- 1997: (23 August) S M Nazrul Islam of Bangladesh University of Engineering and Technology (BUET) was appointed the third vice-chancellor.
- 2001: (14 February) The second convocation was held.
- 2003: (9 March) The first senate meeting was held.
- 2010: (28 December) The fourth convocation was held.
- 2015: (25 November) The fifth convocation was held.
- 2019: (22 December) The sixth convocation was held.

The academic program of the university commenced in August 1991 with four disciplines: Computer Science and Engineering (CSE), Architecture, Business Administration (BA), and Urban and Rural Planning (URP).

In the following year, Forestry and Wood Technology (FWT) and Fisheries and Marine Resources Technology (FMRT) disciplines started up. Now, there are 29 disciplines under eight schools and one institute. The medium of instruction is English.

== Administration ==
=== List of vice-chancellors ===
1. Golam Rahman (1 August 1991 – 22 August 1993)
2. Golam Ali Fakir (23 August 1993 – 22 August 1997)
3. S M Nazrul Islam (23 August 1997 – 22 August 2001)
4. Jafor Reza Khan (29 August 2001 – 18 November 2001)
5. M Abdul Kadir Bhuiyan (19 November 2001 – 20 March 2005)
6. Mahbubur Rahman (20 March 2005 – 14 February 2008)
7. Md Saifuddin Shah (15 October 2008 – 16 November 2012)
8. Mohammad Fayek Uz Zaman (17 November 2012 – 9 January 2013)
9. Mohammad Fayek Uz Zaman (10 January 2013 – 29 January 2021)
10. Mahmood Hossain (25 May 2021 – 20 August 2024)
11. Md. Rezaul Karim (17 October 2024 – present)

== Schools, institutes and disciplines ==
There are eight schools and one institute at Khulna University, which has 29 disciplines:

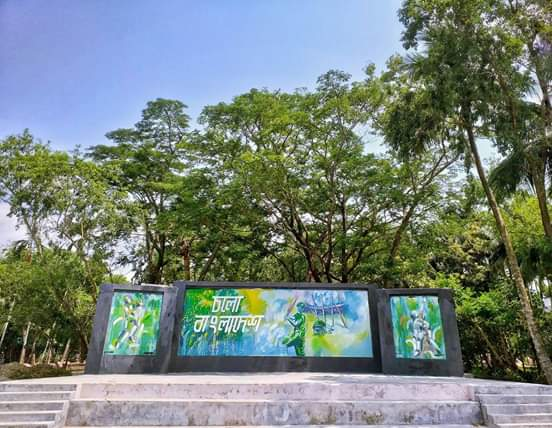
KU Mukto Moncho

=== Science, Engineering and Technology (SET) School ===
- Architecture (ARCH) Discipline
- Chemistry (CHEM) Discipline
- Computer Science and Engineering (CSE) Discipline
- Electronics and Communication Engineering (ECE) Discipline
- Mathematics (MATH) Discipline
- Physics (PHY) Discipline
- Statistics (STAT) Discipline
- Urban and Rural Planning (URP) Discipline

=== Life Science (LS) School ===
- Agrotechnology (AT) Discipline
- Biotechnology and Genetic Engineering (BGE) Discipline
- Environmental Science (ES) Discipline
- Fisheries and Marine Resources Technology (FMRT) Discipline
- Forestry and Wood Technology (FWT) Discipline
- Pharmacy (PHARM) Discipline
- Soil, Water and Environment (SWE) Discipline

=== School of Management & Business Administration (MBA) ===
- Business Administration (BA) Discipline
- Human Resource Management (HRM) Discipline

=== Social Science School ===
- Economics (ECON) Discipline
- Development Studies (DS) Discipline
- Sociology (SOC) Discipline
- Mass Communication and Journalism (MCJ) Discipline

=== Arts and Humanities School ===
- Bangla Language and Literature (BNL) Discipline
- English (ENG) Discipline
- History and Civilization Discipline

=== School of Law ===
- Law Discipline

=== Fine Arts School ===
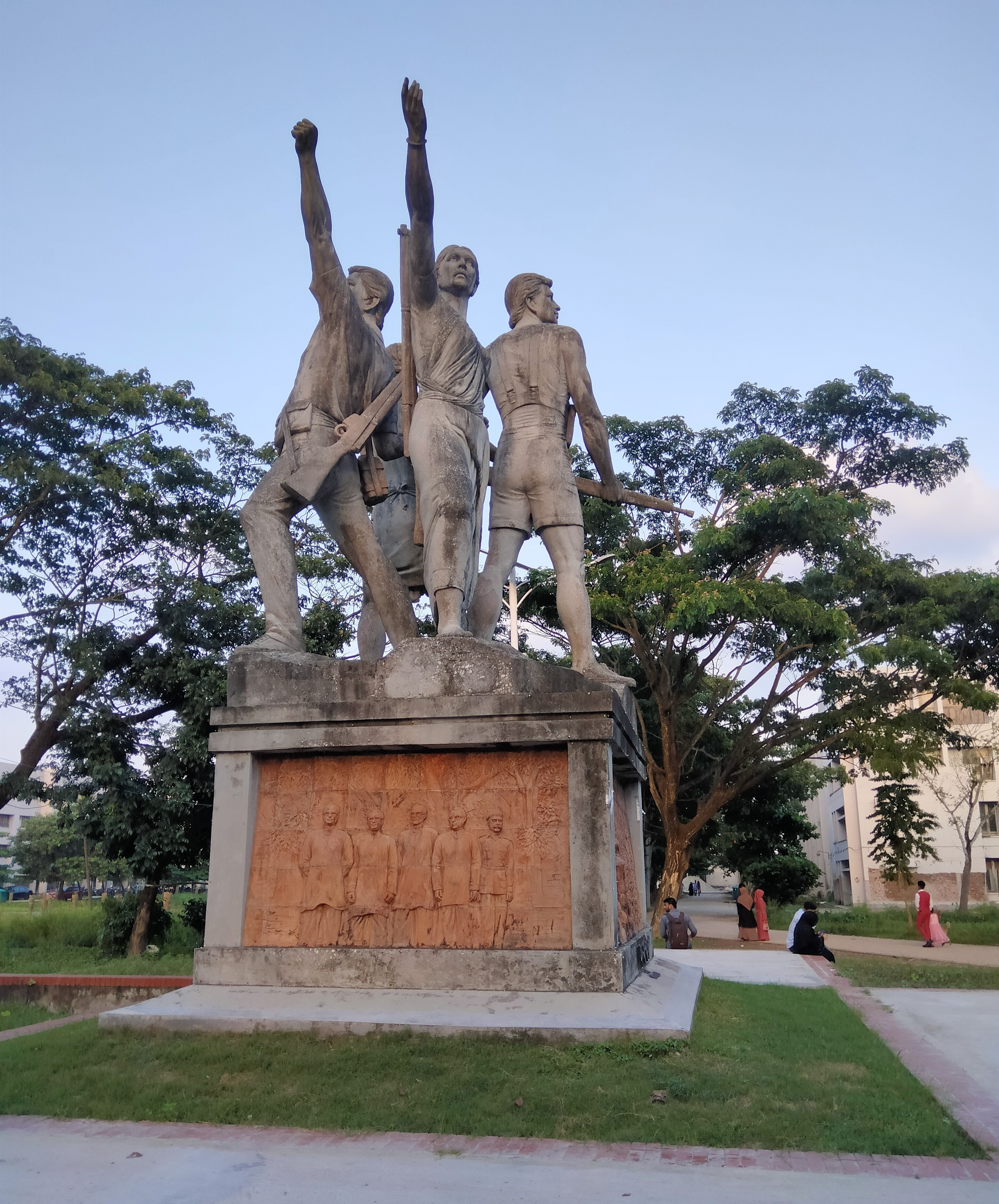
Adamya Bangla

A sculpture Adamya Bangla is the symbol of the Fine arts school.

Institute of Fine Arts offers a four-year undergraduate course leading to the bachelor's degree of fine arts (BFA). At present, there are three disciplines:

- Drawing and Painting (DP) Discipline
- Print-Making Discipline
- Sculpture Discipline

=== Education School ===
The School of Education began the 2017–2018 academic year by offering postgraduate degree in teachers' training. There is one discipline:

- Institute of Education and Research

They are offering the following degrees:

- Bachelor in Education (BEd)
- Masters in Education (MEd)
- Postgraduate Diploma in Education (PGDEd.)

== Disciplines ==
=== Agrotechnology ===
The Agrotechnology Discipline at Khulna University was established in March 1996. The curricula cover all courses offered by the relevant institutions in the country as well as they incorporate Geographic Information System (GlS), Spreadsheet Analysis, and Computer Studies.

Agrotechnology Discipline also works with technologies like biotechnology, tissue culture, genetic engineering, protected agriculture, heat stress mitigation, irrigation management, IPM (Integrated Pest Management), biological control (BC) of pests, etc. The discipline also collects and evaluates germplasm through its 'Germplasm Center'.

=== Architecture discipline ===
Architecture discipline is the second architectural discipline in Bangladesh and one of the first four disciplines opened at Khulna University, which formally launched its academic activities under SET School in 1991. The curriculum of architecture provides the students with knowledge of man, his society, his physical environment and the technological development around the world. The Bachelor of Architecture (BArch) program of the discipline is designed for five years. There is also an opportunity to earn a master's degree.

=== Bangla language and literature discipline ===
Bangla discipline was introduced in 2010–2011. It offers B.A.Hons. in Bangla language and literature. An MS program will be introduced soon.

=== Biotechnology and genetic engineering discipline ===
Biotechnology and genetic engineering (the then biotechnology) discipline launched its academic activities in 1995. In 2003, the discipline was renamed "Biotechnology and Genetic Engineering". The discipline offers a four-year professional BSc degree in biotechnology and genetic engineering and a two-year MS degree in biotechnology and genetic engineering.

=== Business administration discipline ===
The business administration discipline began in 1991. The university offers a 4-year bachelor's degree in business administration (BBA). The university has run management training programs for the Bangladesh naval officers since 1995. The school introduced a regular MBA program in 2002, and an Executive MBA (EMBA) program in 2005. BAD offers a contemporary quality admission process to have students be a part of it & the university.

=== Chemistry discipline ===
Chemistry discipline started in the academic session 2009–2010. It has a B.Sc. (Hons.) in chemistry program. It also offers M.Sc. in chemistry program.

=== Computer science and engineering discipline ===
In 1991, the computer science and engineering (CSE) discipline of Khulna University started its academic activities with 20 undergraduate students in Bachelor of Science in computer science and engineering. This discipline was the second of its kind to offer computer science/engineering education in Bangladesh after BUET. Since then around 600 undergraduate students (of 17 batches) have graduated from the discipline. A perfect 100% of graduates work in government and private organizations as well as in teaching professions at home and abroad. CSE discipline takes 40 students at the undergraduate level each year.

With support from the Ministry of Science and Information Communication Technology, the CSE discipline has run a postgraduate Diploma in Information Technology (PGD-IT) program since 2001. The discipline has achieved its target by producing around 200 PGD-IT professionals.

In 2011, the CSE discipline introduced an MSc.Engineering (CSE) degree. Students of MSc.Engineering (CSE) will benefit from the memorandum of understanding between the CSE discipline of Khulna University and the Department of Computer Science of the University of Saskatchewan, Canada.

Students of CSE have a computer club named Club for Updated Search on Computers (CLUSTER). CLUSTER arranges seminars, programming contests and publishes magazines.

=== Development studies discipline ===
Khulna University is the second public university in Bangladesh that offers a Bachelor of Development Studies BSS (Hons.) program. Development studies discipline offers a four-year BSS (Hons.) in Bachelor of Development Studies under Social Science School. This discipline was introduced in the academic year 2011–2012. Development studies discipline now takes 45 students at the undergraduate level each year. Following the information of 2017, there are about six batches under the Bachelor of Development Studies BSS (Hons.) program. The first batch of this discipline is known as DS'12, sequentially DS'13, DS'14, and others. The development studies discipline has Bachelor's in development studies and master's in development studies programs.

=== Economics discipline ===
Economics discipline started its journey in 1999. Over the years, it has established itself as one of the economics learning institutions in Bangladesh. Graduates of this discipline (department) are contributing to the field of education, research, government services and other private sectors.

The curriculum of this discipline has been framed by blending both theoretical and practical courses. The discipline is offering a four-year Bachelor of Social Science BSS (Hons.) in economics degree, 1.5 years of master's in economics degree and 1.5 years Master's in Development and Policy Studies (MDPS).

=== Electronics and communication engineering discipline ===
Electronics and communication engineering was offered in 1997 under the School of Science, Engineering and Technology (SET) of Khulna University. This discipline is the first of its kind in Bangladesh (i.e., it is the first discipline in Bangladesh that offers an undergraduate degree in electronics means of communication subjects as well as electronics). Besides the regular study curriculum, it conducts a project fair every year on World Telecommunication Day. The students bring their electronics-based projects to the fair. The best ones are rewarded. The discipline has a seminar library, a digital electronics lab, an electrical lab, an analog communication lab, a digital communication lab, a biomedical engineering lab, a computer lab, microwave and antenna lab.

ECE discipline offers a four-year BSc. Engineering. degree in electronics and communication engineering. Till 2015, 16 batches have completed their studies. In April 2012, the ECE discipline commenced an MSc Engineering. in the ECE program with a focus on electronics and communication engineering. PhD Programs in electronics and communications engineering have already been launched from the academic year 2016–2017.

Students of ECE have operated a club named "ROUTER" for Updated Search on ICT Based Technology. ROUTER arranges seminars, and project fairs, and publishes ICT-based magazines. ROUTER is the club of the students of the Electronics & Communication Engineering Discipline of Khulna University. Which elaborates as "Roaming Over the Universe Through Electronic Roadway." The theme line of the club is "In search of a new frontier."

=== English discipline ===
Khulna University includes English literature and English language in its curriculum. English discipline came into existence in 1998, but the academic activities started in 1999. A language center was established.The discipline is GPA-oriented.

Under Arts and Humanities School, English discipline offers one undergraduate and two postgraduate programmes; one of the two MAs is MA in English, with courses in contemporary literature in English, linguistics, and literary theory; the other is MA in the English language that teaches current theoretical and practical courses in English language and linguistics.

=== Environmental science discipline ===
Environmental science as an undergraduate teaching programme is a relatively new one in this country, with Khulna University having opened the discipline in 1997. The subject incorporates physical, chemical and biological sciences, engineering and technology, socio-economics and management. The discipline offers a four-year undergraduate (Bachelor of Science in environmental science) and one and half years of postgraduate (Master of Science in environmental science) degrees and offers a Ph.D. programme.

=== Fisheries and marine resources technology discipline ===
The greater Khulna region, the southwest part of Bangladesh has been characterized by a blend of aquatic habitats; fresh, brackish and marine waters supporting a diversity of biological and physical resources. Situated a few kilometers away from the Bay of Bengal, this region has Sundarbans, the world's largest mangrove forest crisscrossed by creeks and canals.

Understanding the potential of such resources to the prospects of the country, the Fisheries and Marine Resources Technology Discipline was established in 1992 with a mandate to establish an avenue for research and academic programs in all aspects of fisheries for the second time in the country after Chittagong University. Chittagong University introduced undergraduate and postgraduate level education in Marine Science under the Institute of Marine Science and Fisheries (IMSCU) in the early seventies. Over the last fourteen years, the FMRT Discipline has experienced substantial growth resulting in a reputation for training and research, particularly concerning coastal aquaculture and mangrove ecosystems.

The course followed in the discipline has provisions for education in biology, ecology, culture and post-harvest fisheries. The course, in addition, involves socio-economics, statistics, GIS and remote sensing, computer applications, etc. The teaching staff of the discipline possesses knowledge in fish biology, marine science, aquaculture, fisheries management, genetics and fish breeding, ecology, oceanography and post-harvest technology. The FMRT discipline is now preparing to launch Ph.D. courses in addition to BSc and M.S. ones.

=== Forestry and wood technology discipline ===
Khulna University launched forestry and wood technology (FWT) discipline as a second university in Bangladesh, in 1992. It offers a four-year Bachelor of Science (Honors) degree in forestry and a one-year Master of Science (MS) degree in forestry. The discipline is close to the world's largest single-tract mangrove forest, Sundarbans, and the forest-deficient northern region of the country where forest extension and social forestry programme are increasingly realized. Given this geographic consideration, the mission of the FWT discipline in education and research stresses mangrove forestry, social forestry, forest management, forest tree improvement and wood science and technology.

=== History and civilization discipline ===
History and civilization discipline will start their journey from the academic year 2016–2017, offering a 4-year Bachelor of Arts degree (abbreviated as B.A. (Hons.)) in history and civilization.

=== Human resource management discipline ===
Human resource management (HRM) is a newly introduced discipline at Khulna University. The discipline has begun a bachelor's program in the academic year 2015–2016.

=== Law and justice discipline ===
Law and justice discipline is another new discipline of Khulna University, offering 4 years LLB(Hons) courses from the academic year 2016–2017. Their LLM program will start soon.

=== Mass communication and journalism discipline ===
Mass communication and journalism (MCJ) discipline is a newly introduced discipline, commencing a bachelor's degree program in the academic year 2015–2016.

=== Mathematics discipline ===
The mathematics discipline was opened in the academic session 1998–99, offering a four-year undergraduate course leading to the degree of Bachelor of Science (Honors) in mathematics, abbreviated as B.Sc. (Hons.) in mathematics and Masters of Science in applied mathematics abbreviated as M.Sc. in applied mathematics. This discipline also offers a Ph.D. program for researchers.

=== Pharmacy discipline ===
Many of the present-day medicines are directly or indirectly obtained from plants of local origin and those of the Sundarbans, a large source of medicinal plants. Some of the reported medicinal plants enjoy their use in herbal preparation. However most of the plants need to be scientifically evaluated. To this end, Pharmacy Discipline started its academic activities in 1997 under Life Science School offering a four-year Bachelor of Pharmacy (Hons.) degree with an aim of proper evaluation of the plants of medicinal value available in the mangrove forest as well as of medicinal plants in the native southern region.

=== Physics discipline ===
Physics discipline started its journey on 28 March 2010 with 38 students in its inauguration batch in the academic session 2009–2010. This discipline currently offers a B.Sc.(Hons.), M.Sc. in physics. This discipline is also enrolling students for M.Phil. and Ph.D. programs in Physics. This discipline achieved two gold medalists and many trophies, with five consecutive championships in a volleyball inter-discipline tournament.

Fermineff Team from this discipline participated in the International Theoretical Physics Olympiad 2020 and secured 15th position in the world and 1st position in the country. Additionally, another team from physics discipline won a silver medal in University Physics Competition 2019.

=== Soil, water and environment discipline ===
Established in 1999 as soil science discipline, it was renamed as soil, water and environment discipline in 2017. The course and curriculum provide graduates with knowledge in the fields of soil genesis, hydrology, soil physics, soil chemistry, soil biochemistry, soil microbiology, ecology and ecosystems, soil mineralogy, soil survey, land evaluation, soil erosion and conservation, sustainable land use, watershed management, irrigation and drainage technology, groundwater hydrology, agronomy, soil fertility and plant nutrition, and soil management and others environmental related courses.

The discipline offers a four-year undergraduate programme leading to the B.Sc. (Hons.) in soil, water and environment degree. In 2008, a Masters programme was started.

=== Sociology discipline ===
Starting in 2003, sociology is one of the prominent disciplines of Khulna University under the Social Science School. The discipline offers a four-year Bachelor of Social Science (B.S.S.) Honors in Sociology degree as well as 1.5 years Master of Social Science (M.S.S.). It also teaches students of almost all other disciplines of Khulna University to fulfill their course requirements.

=== Statistics discipline ===
Statistics discipline under Science, Engineering and Technology (SET) School is one of the new disciplines at Khulna University. It initiated its journey in the 2011–2012 academic session. At the undergraduate level, statistics disciplines offer majors in statistics and decision science which can be taken in BSc (Honors) degrees. At the postgraduate level, advanced courses majoring in statistics have also been offered.

The discipline is distinguished by the faculty's strong interest in the application of statistics to diverse areas such as public policy, economics, engineering, medicine and life sciences, law, and the social and behavioral sciences. The research areas which are mainly focused here include- Data Mining, Econometrics and Quality Control, Demography and Research Methods, Experimental Design and Inference, Sampling Techniques, Inferences and Multivariate Analysis, Time Series Analysis and Forecasting, Demography, Stochastic Process, Computer Package and Programming, Biostatistics and Reliability Theory, Health Statistics, Epidemiology, Bio-informatics, Environmental Statistics and so on.

=== Urban and rural planning discipline ===
The urban and rural planning (URP) discipline was the earliest academic discipline in the country to impart planning education at the undergraduate level and was established at Khulna University in 1991. It is one of the four disciplines with which Khulna University started its academic programme. The urban and rural planning discipline offers a four-year undergraduate degree in urban and rural planning. The discipline offers a master's degree programme in urban and rural planning.

- Degree programs: BURP, MURP, PhD
- Laboratories: Geographic Information System (GIS), Remote Sensing (RS), Planning Information System (PIS)
- Library: Seminar Library
- Research Center: Planning and Development Research Center (PDRC)
- Discipline Journal: Plan Plus
- Khulna University planners alumni

== Degrees offered by KU ==
=== School of Life Science ===
- Agrotechnology: BSc. (Hons.), MSc., PhD
- Biotechnology: BSc., MSc., PhD
- Environment Science: BSc., MSc., PhD
- Fisheries and Marine Resource Technology Discipline: BSc., MSc., PhD
- Forestry and Wood Technology: BSc. (Hons.), MSc, PhD
- Pharmacy Discipline: B.Pharm., M.Pharm.
- Soil, Water and Environment Discipline: BSc.(Hons.), MSc., PhD

=== School of Science, Engineering and Technology ===
- Architecture: BArch, MScHS
- Computer Science and Engineering: BSc. Engg. (accredited by the Institute of Engineers, Bangladesh, the second discipline in Bangladesh offering an engineering degree in CSE), MSc. Engg., MCA, PhD, PGDIT
- Chemistry: BSc (Hons.), MSc., PhD
- Electronics and Communication Engineering: BSc. Engg. (accredited by the IEB), MSc. Engg., PhD
- Mathematics: BSc. (Hons.), MSc., PhD
- Physics: BSc. (Hons.), MSc., PhD
- Statistics: BSc. (Hons.), MSc., PhD
- Urban and Rural Planning: BURP, MURP, PhD

=== School of Management and Business Administration ===
- Business Administration: BBA, MBA, MBA (Evening), Defense MBA
- Human Resource Management: BBA, MBA

=== School of Social Science ===
- Economics: BSS (Hons.), MSS, MDPS, PhD
- Sociology: BSS (Hons.), MSS, MPGS, PhD
- Development Studies: BSS (Hons.), MDS, PhD
- Mass Communication and Journalism: BSS (Hons.)

=== School of Arts and Humanities ===
- Bangla

=== School of Law ===
- Law: LLB, LLM

=== Fine Arts School ===
- Fine Arts School offers BFA and MFA degrees.

=== Education School ===
Institute of Education and Research :BEd, MEd, PGDEd.

== Kazi Nazrul Islam Central library ==
Kazi Nazrul Islam Central Library, Khulna University was established in 1987. Before, it was housed in Academic Building I, D block. The library room has a floor space of 5,000 sq. ft. (465 sq meters). The library has its building now. The reading room has accommodation for 125 students, 25 teachers and research scholars working simultaneously. Khulna University library has a collection of 25,000 reading materials, including 23,000 books and 200 bound volumes of journals. The university library has a computer network for communication with national and international universities and institutions through the Internet.

The library is linked with the Automation and Networking of Science Technology Libraries in Bangladesh (BANSLINK) a pilot project of the Ministry of Science and Technology, the government of Bangladesh and Bangladesh National Scientific and Technical Documentation Center (BANSDOC) is the executing agency of the Project. Khulna University is also linked with Bangladesh's Education and Research Network. (BERNET) Project organized by the University Grants Commission (UGC), Bangladesh.

The central library is a Wi-Fi hotspot.

== Khulna University Central Masjid ==
Khulna University Central Masjid was inaugurated on 28 August 2020 by The then Vice Chancellor Md Fayek Uzzaman. The total area of the masjid is 14500 square feet, while 2000 people can be accommodated at a time. The construction design was done by Ali Naqi, former professor of Architecture Discipline, Khulna University. Later, Associate Professor Shaikh Md Maruf Hossain finalized the design. The Masjid occupies 1 acre of land, located near to Kotka monument. The male residential halls (Khan Jahan Ali Hall, Khan Bahadur Ahsanullah Hall, and Jatir Jonok Bongobondhu Shaikha Mujibur Rahman Hall) are also located in proximity to the masjid. It is a single-dome masjid. The dome is the largest of its kind in the Khulna region.

== Khulna University Central Temple ==
Khulna University Central Temple was established in response to the continuous demands of Hindu students of the university. It is situated in front of Aparajita Hall and Sir Acharya Jagadish Chandra Academic Building and beside the Lakeside walkway. The foundation stone of the temple was laid on 15 February 2013. Construction of the temple was started on 20 August 2015. It took 7 years and 7 months to inaugurate the long-awaited temple from foundation date. The main temple is about 1100 square feet and the temple compound is about 3,000 square feet. The then Vice Chancellor Md Fayek Uzzaman inaugurated the temple on 24 September 2020. Hindu students of the university observe Sarawsati Puja here every year. A magazine "Panchami" is published each year during the Sarawsati Puja. Besides, Krishna Janmashtami is observed annually by the Hindu students. They also observe Diwali every year lightening well lamp over the campus including Hadi Chattar, Main Gate. Additionally, Khichuri Prasad is arranged frequently by the Hindu students of the university.

== Student accommodation ==
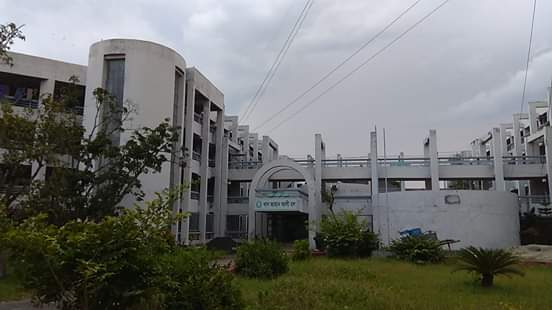
Khan Jahan Ali Hall

The university has five halls of residence for the students. Two more student halls are under process:

=== Male Hall ===
- Khan Jahan Ali Hall
- Khan Bahadur Ahsanullah Hall ( Khaba)
- Birsherestho Muhammad Ruhul Amin Hall

=== Female hall ===
- Aparajita Hall
- Bijoy 24 Hall

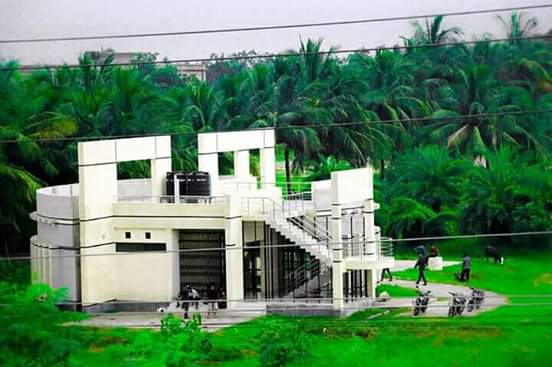
Khulna University Central Gymnasium

== See also ==
- List of Islamic educational institutions
- Islamic University, Bangladesh (IU)
- Jashore University of Science and Technology (JUST)
- Khulna Agricultural University ( KAU)
- Khulna Medical University ( KMU)
- Bangladesh University of Textiles (BUTEX)
- Military Institute of Science and Technology (MIST)
- Khulna University of Engineering & Technology (KUET)
- Jahangirnagar University (JU)
