= Mohammad Fayek Uz Zaman =

Vice-Chancellor of Khulna University
- In office 10 January 2013 – 28 January 2021
- Preceded by: Md. Saifuddin Shah
- Succeeded by: Mahmood Hossain

Personal details
- Occupation: University academic

Mohammad Fayek Uzzaman is a Bangladeshi academic and a former vice chancellor of Khulna University. He is a professor in the Department of Islamic History and Culture at the University of Rajshahi. His Ph.D. is on the topic of the Liberation War of Bangladesh and Mujibanagar Sarkar.

== Career ==
Zaman served as the pro-vice-chancellor of Khulna University from 28 November 2010. Earlier he served as a professor in the Islamic History and Cultural Department of Rajshahi University.

In January 2013, Zaman was appointed as the vice-chancellor of Khulna University. He was appointed for the second term in January 2017. His second tenure ended on 28 January 2021.

== Works ==
Mohammad Fayek Uzzaman's first book was on the Iran-Iraq War, titled ইরান ইরাক বিরোধ ও সাম্প্রতিক যুদ্ধ (Iran-Iraq Birodh O Shamprotik Juddho), later republished as ইরান ইরাক যুদ্ধ ( Iran-Iraq War). His PhD thesis was later published, titled মুজিবনগর সরকার ও বাংলাদেশের মুক্তিযুদ্ধ( Mujibnagar Sarkar O Bangladesher Muktijuddho). His third book was on sectarianism, terrorism and the history of Bangladesh from 1952 to 1975. The book was titled সাম্প্রদায়িকতা থেকে জঙ্গিবাদ: ভাষা আন্দোলন, মুক্তিযুদ্ধ ও বঙ্গবন্ধু হত্যাকাণ্ড( Shamprodayikota Theke Jongibad: Bhasha Andolon, Muktijuddho O Bongobondhu Hottyakando) Two collections of columns were published in 2019 titled শেখ মুজিব : মেঠোপথের বংশীবাদক( Sheikh Mujib: Methopother Bongshibadok) and আপনিইতো বাংলাদেশ( Apnie To Bangladesh).
