= Satkhira Medical College =

Public medical school in Bangladesh

- সাতক্ষীরা মেডিকেল কলেজ
- Other name: SMC
- Type: Public medical school
- Established: 2011 (15 years ago)
- Academic affiliations: Khulna Medical University
- Principal: Ruhul Quddus
- Director: Sital Chowdhury
- Academic staff: 61
- Administrative staff: 15
- Students: 475
- Undergraduates: 460
- Postgraduates: 15
- Location: Satkhira-Bhomra Highway, Bakal, Satkhira, Bangladesh; 22.6901°N 89.0469°E
- Campus: Urban
- Language: English

Satkhira Medical College (SMC) (Bengali: সাতক্ষীরা মেডিকেল কলেজ) is a public medical school in Bangladesh, established in 2011. It is located in the south-western city of Satkhira in Khulna Division.

It offers a five-year medical education course leading to an MBBS degree. A one-year internship after graduation is compulsory for all graduates. The degree is recognized by the Bangladesh Medical and Dental Council.

The college is associated with the 500-bed Satkhira Medical College Hospital.

Journal of Satkhira Medical College is the official journal of the medical college.

== History ==
During a visit to Shyamnagar Upazila in July 2010, Prime Minister Sheikh Hasina promised that Satkhira District would get a medical college. S Z Atiq was appointed acting principal in October 2011. A house and community center in Satkhira town were rented as a temporary campus in December. Instruction began in January 2012.

The foundation stone of a permanent campus was laid on 20 July 2012 by then Minister of Health and Family Welfare AFM Ruhal Haque. Construction was expected to cost 860 million Bangladeshi taka ($10.5M as of 2012). Pending construction of a medical college hospital, practical instruction took place at Satkhira Sadar Hospital, 6 kilometres (3.7 mi) away.

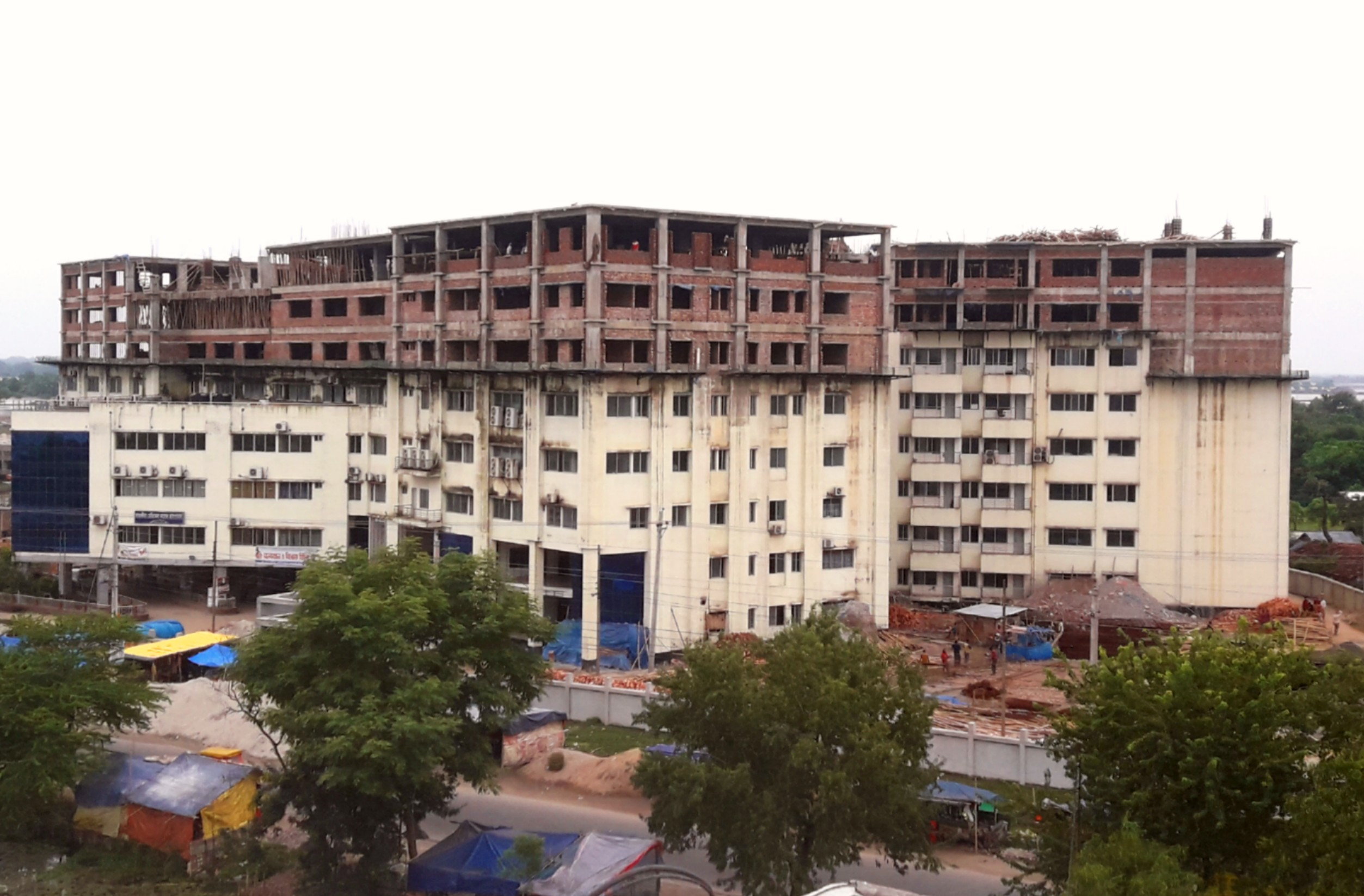
SMCH under construction, October 2018

The foundation stone of Satkhira Medical College Hospital was laid on 20 January 2014 by Prime Minister Sheikh Hasina. The nominally 500-bed hospital was formally inaugurated on 4 April 2015 by Minister of Health and Family Welfare Mohammed Nasim, but in November it still wasn't fully operational. The Anti Corruption Commission sued former principal S. Z Atiq, Satkhira Sadar Hospital consultant Ruhul Quddus, and others in August 2015 for embezzling Tk 137 million ($1.8M as of 2014) in connection with purchasing equipment for the hospital during fiscal year 2013–2014.

In early 2020, the emergency ward was yet to open, and the hospital was operating fewer than 250 beds. There were only 17 doctors on staff, against a full complement of 58. Patients were sent to private hospitals for tests while modern medical equipment sat unused in the hospital because of a lack of skilled technicians and chemical reagents.

== Organization and administration ==
The college is affiliated with Rajshahi Medical University and Khulna Medical University. The principal of the college is Quazi Arif Ahmed. The director of the hospital is Sk Qudrat -E- Khuda.

=== Principals ===
- S Z Atiq (2012–2014)
- Kazi Habibur Rahman (2015–2021)
- Ruhul Quddus (2021–2025)
- Quazi Arif Ahmed (2025-present)

=== Satkhira Medical College Hospital directors ===
- Sital Chawdhury
- Sk Qudrat -E- Khuda (Present)

== Academics ==
The college offers a five-year course of study, approved by the Bangladesh Medical and Dental Council (BMDC), leading to a Bachelor of Medicine, Bachelor of Surgery (MBBS) degree from Sheikh Hasina Medical University, Khulna. After passing the final professional examination, there is a compulsory one-year internship. The internship is a prerequisite for obtaining registration from the BMDC to practice medicine.

Admission for Bangladeshis to the MBBS course at all medical colleges in Bangladesh is controlled centrally by the Directorate General of Health Services (DGHS). It administers an annual, written, multiple choice question admission exam simultaneously across the country. It sets prerequisites for who can take the exam, and sets a minimum pass level. DGHS has varied the admission rules over the years, but historically candidates have been admitted based primarily on their score on this test. Grades at the Secondary School Certificate (SSC) and Higher Secondary School Certificate (HSC) level have also been a factor, as part of a combined score or as a prerequisite for taking the exam. DGHS also admits candidates to fill quotas: freedom fighters' descendants, tribal, foreign, and others. Admission for foreign students is based on their SSC and HSC grades. As of July 2014, the college is allowed to admit 52 students annually.

== Journal ==
Journal of Satkhira Medical College is the official journal of the college.

== See also ==
- List of medical colleges in Bangladesh
