= Md. Rezaul Karim =

Rezaul Karim is a Bangladeshi urban planner, a professor at the Urban and Rural Planning Discipline, and the Vice-Chancellor of Khulna University.

== Early life ==
Karim completed his Secondary School Certificate (SSC) from Tejgaon Government High School in 1975 and his Higher Secondary Certificate (HSC) from Notre Dame College in 1977. In 1981, he earned a Bachelor of Science degree in Agricultural Engineering from Bangladesh Agricultural University. He later obtained a master's degree in urban and regional planning from Bangladesh University of Engineering and Technology (BUET) in 1985. He received his Ph.D. from the Department of Geography and Environment at University of Rajshahi in 2000.

== Career ==
From 1983 to 1984, Karim worked as a Scientific Officer at the Bangladesh Agricultural Research Council. He then served as an Urban Planning Consultant at the Rajdhani Unnayan Kartripakkha (RAJUK) from 1987 to 1988. Between 1988 and 1991, he held the position of assistant director at the Implementation Monitoring and Evaluation Division under the Ministry of Planning. In 1991, he joined Khulna University as an assistant professor in the Urban and Rural Planning Discipline, later becoming a full professor.

Alongside teaching, Karim has held several administrative roles at Khulna University, including Senate and Syndicate member, Dean of the School of Science, Engineering, and Technology, Director of the Institutional Quality Assurance Cell, Director of Student Affairs, and Head of the Urban and Rural Planning Discipline. Additionally, he has worked as a consultant for various national and international organizations.

In December 2022, Karim signed a statement calling on the government to release Mirza Fakhrul Islam Alamgir, general secretary of the Bangladesh Nationalist Party. He served as a president of a pro-Bangladesh Nationalist Party teachers organization.

On October 17, 2024, Karim was appointed as the Vice-Chancellor of Khulna University and officially assumed office on October 20 following the fall of the Sheikh Hasina led Awami League government. He succeeded Professor Mahmud Hasan. Notably, he is the third Vice-Chancellor to be appointed from among the faculty members of Khulna University. He inaugurated a Mugdha Water Corner named after Mir Mahfuzur Rahman Mugdho, who was killed in protests against former Prime Minister Sheikh Hasina.

Karim renamed all dorms and academic building of the university; Bangabandhu Sheikh Mujibur Rahman Hall is now known as Bir Shrestha Mohammad Ruhul Amin Hall, while Bangamata Fazilatunnesa Mujib Hall has been renamed Bijoy 24 Hall. The Satyendra Nath Bose Academic Building is now Academic Building 1, Jagadish Chandra Bose Academic Building is Academic Building 2, Poet Jibanananda Das Academic Building is Academic Building 3, and Joy Bangla Building is Academic Building 4. Additionally, the Shaheed Tajuddin Ahmad Administrative Building has been renamed the Administrative Building, and the Shaheed Intellectual Dr. Aleem Chowdhury Medical Center is now called the Khulna University Medical Center. The Sultana Kamal Gymnasium has been renamed Khulna University Gymnasium, and the Acharya Prafulla Chandra Ray Central Research Laboratory is now the Khulna University Central Research Laboratory.
