= Khulna Medical College =

Government medical school in Khulna, Bangladesh

- খুলনা মেডিকেল কলেজ
- Type: Public medical school
- Established: 8 July 1992 (34 years ago)
- Academic affiliations: Khulna Medical University
- Principal: Professor Dr. Syed Amanul Islam
- Academic staff: 135
- Students: 900
- Location: Chhoto Boyra, Khulna, Khulna, Bangladesh; 22.8291°N 89.5370°E
- Campus: Urban 40.25 acres (16.29 ha)
- Language: English
- Website: kmc.gov.bd

The Khulna Medical College (KMC) (Bengali: খুলনা মেডিকেল কলেজ) is a government medical school in Khulna, Bangladesh. It is affiliated with Khulna Medical University. It is located in the city of Khulna, near the inter-district Bus Stand at the entrance to the city.

Khulna Medical College was established in 1992. The legendary person of KMC is Professor Dr Golam Mashud, head of the department of Hepatology. Now he is the running Principal of Khulna Medical College. He joined as principal in 06/03/2025.

== National and international recognition ==
This institute is recognized by BCPS (Bangladesh College of Physicians and Surgeons) for postgraduate training and it has been included in WHO directory of medical colleges. As such graduates from this college can take part in USMLE examination in the United States.

== Departments ==
- Anatomy
- Anesthesiology
- Blood Transfusion
- Burn & Plastic Surgery
- Cardiology
- Cardiac Surgery
- Community Medicine
- Dermatology
- Forensic Medicine
- Gastroenterology
- Gynaecology and Obstetrics
- Hepatology
- Medicine
- Microbiology
- Neurology
- Neurosurgery
- Ophthalmology
- Oral & Maxillofacial Surgery
- Orthopedics
- Otorhinolaryngology
- Surgery
- Pathology
- Pediatric Surgery
- Pediatrics
- Pharmacology
- Psychiatry
- Radiology
- Radiotherapy
- Respiratory Medicine
- Surgery
- Surgical Oncology
- Urology

== Campus ==
The academic building, adjacent to the hospital, is a four-story building which houses both administrative and academic sections: administration, students' areas, and office of the Principal. For educational purposes, there are classrooms, galleries, a library, and an audio-visual unit. There are four large galleries for combined classes and six student residences, along with quarters for staff and officers of the college and hospital.

== Organization and administration ==
Khulna Medical College is affiliated with Khulna Medical University, Khulna.

== Academics ==
Prospective students take an admission test conducted by the Ministry of Health. Students selected are then admitted on the basis of their choice. The students receive a MBBS degree after the completion of their fifth year and after passing the final Professional MBBS examination. This college is directly regulated by Bangladesh Medical and Dental Council, an affiliate of the Bangladesh Ministry of Health.

== Club ==
Khulna Medical College has 3 clubs approved by the college. They are Khulna Medical College Cultural Society, Khulna Medical College Debating Club and Khulna Medical College Sports Club. Apart from this, the Medicine Club, Khulna Medical College Unit has been conducting its activities which are managed by the Central Executive Council of the Medicine Club. There are also student-led voluntary organization Red Nucleus Association and Dawah Society of KMC.

== KMC DAY ==
"KMC Day" is celebrated at Khulna Medical College on 8 July. Note: The first admission process was started on 8 July 1992 in Khulna Medical College.

== Gallery ==
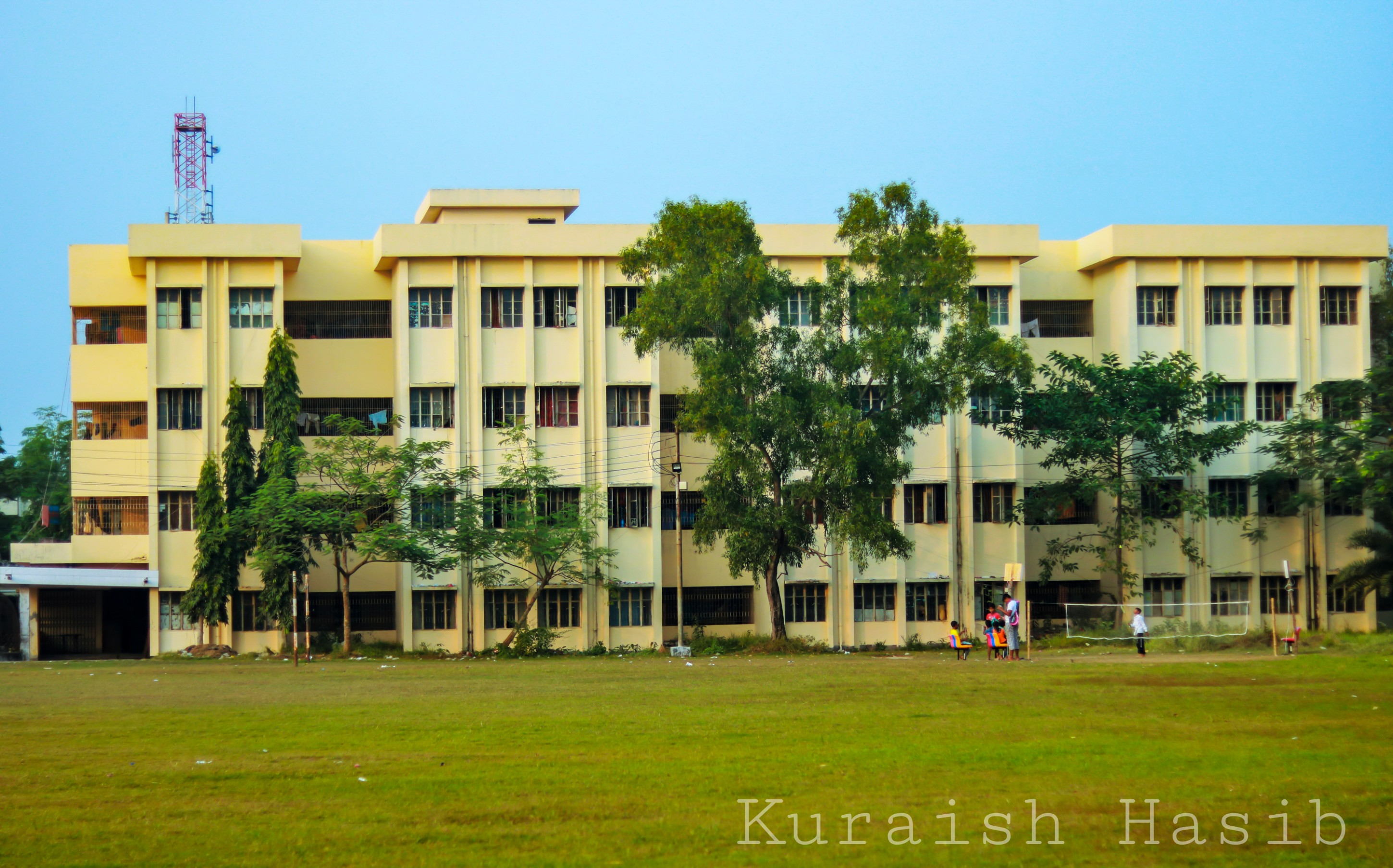
Birsreshtho Ruhul Amin Boys Hostel, KMC

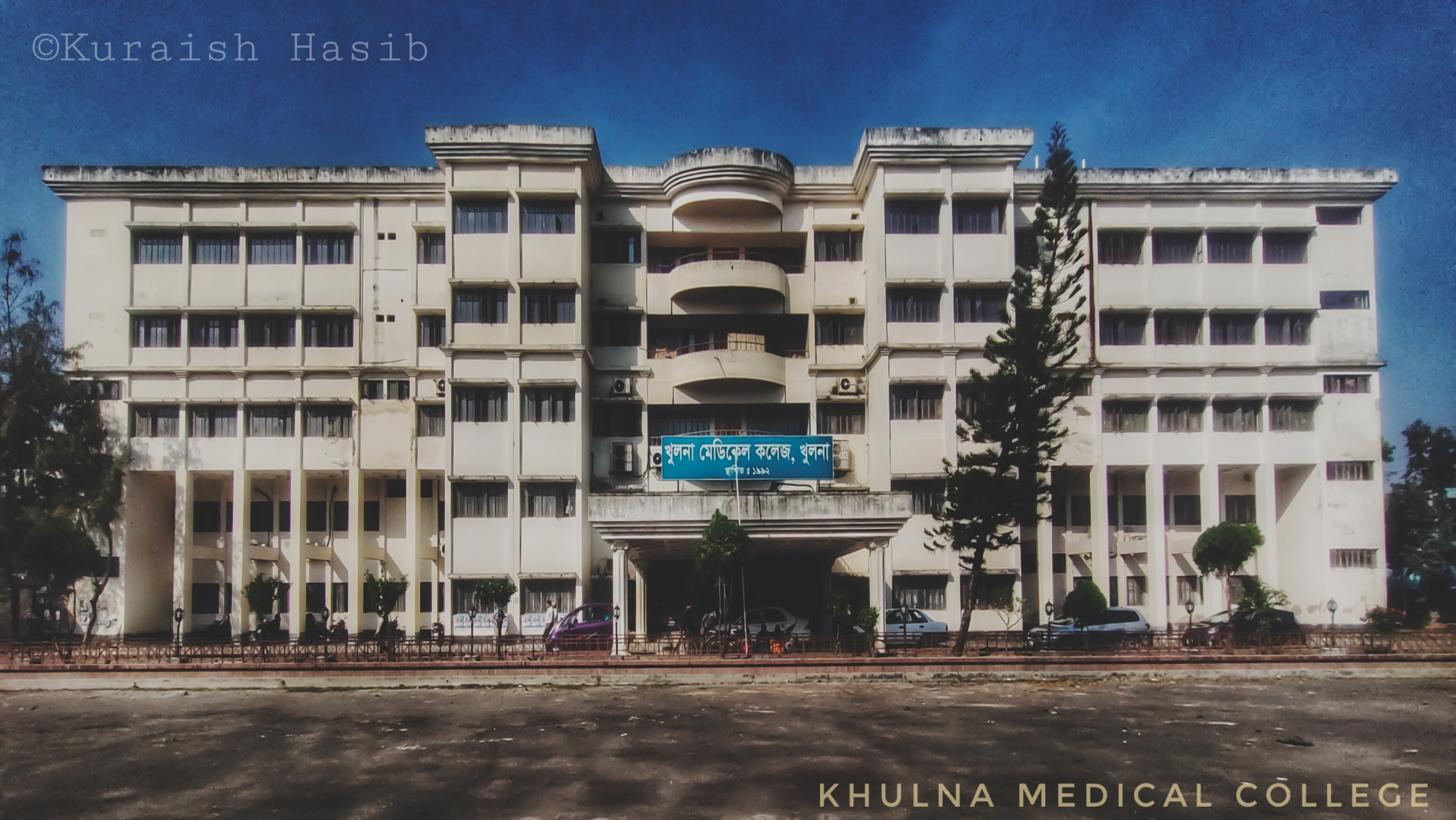
Academic Building, KMC

== See also ==
- List of medical colleges in Bangladesh
