= Bagerhat Government High School =

Bagerhat Government Secondary School
- বাগেরহাট সরকারি উচ্চ বিদ্যালয়

Location
- Police Line Road, Bagerhat; 9300; Bangladesh; 22.6610°N 89.7939°E

Information
- School type: Secondary state school
- Motto: Education is the backbone of a nation
- Established: 1947
- School district: Bagerhat
- School number: 114761
- Headmaster: Tarafder Shariful Islam (In Charge)
- Faculty: Science, Commerce, Arts
- Grades: 3 to 10
- Gender: Male
- Age range: 8 to 16
- Enrollment: 2,000
- Language: Bangla
- Campus type: Urban
- Colours: White and Navy Blue
- Team name: BGHS
- Newspaper: Agradut

Bagerhat Government High School is a public secondary school located in the heart of Bagerhat town in Bagerhat Sadar Upazila, Bangladesh. It was established as Nurul Amin School in 1947 by getting help from the British Government. In 1967, the school became a government high school. After the liberation war, the previous name was removed and it holds its current name as Bagerhat Government Secondary School. This school has two shifts and enrollment of approximately 2,000 students.

== Alumni ==
- Mahmood Hossain, mangrove ecologist and university administrator, completed his SSC in 1987.
- Md Sajid Hasan, Completed his SSC in 2016 from Business Studies Group. Working in a growing tech company situated at Dhaka.
