= Md. Harunor Rashid Khan =

Bangladeshi academic and physicist (born 1967)

Dr. Md. Harunor Rashid Khan
- ড. মো: হারুনর রশীদ খান
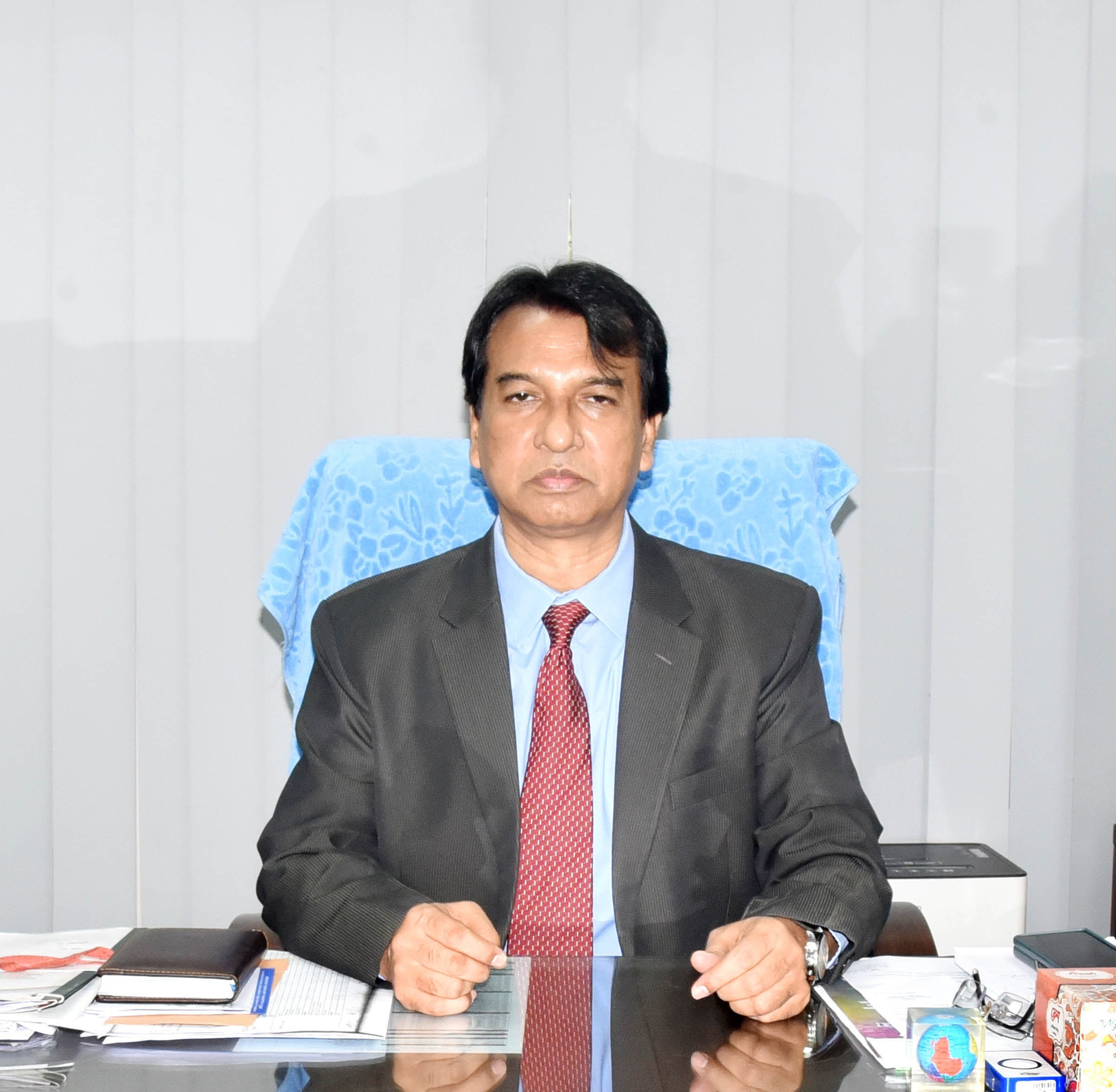
- H. R. Khan in 2024

Pro Vice-Chancellor of Khulna University
- Incumbent
- Assumed office October 2024
- Preceded by: Mosummath Hosna Ara

Personal details
- Born: 1967 (age 58–59) Bangladesh
- Education: Jahangirnagar University
- Occupation: Academic, physicist, university administrator

Md. Harunor Rashid Khan (Bengali: মো: হারুনর রশীদ খান; born 1967) is a Bangladeshi academic, physicist and university administrator. He is serving as the Pro-Vice-Chancellor of Khulna University since October 2024. He is also a professor in the Discipline of Physics at Khulna University.

== Early life and education ==
Khan was born in Bangladesh in 1967. He completed his early education in his home district. He later pursued higher education in physics at Jahangirnagar University, where he obtained his bachelor's and master's degrees. He subsequently earned his PhD in High Energy Physics in 1999 from Saga University and the High Energy Accelerator Research Organization (KEK), Japan, as a Monbusho Scholar.

== Career ==
Khan is currently serving as the Pro-Vice-Chancellor of Khulna University since October 2024.

Prior to this, he served as the Head of the Physics Discipline at Khulna University from August 2023 to October 2024. He has been a Professor in the Physics Discipline at Khulna University since 2006, with his current tenure continuing from August 2021.

Khan also served internationally as a Professor in the Department of Physics and Astronomy at King Saud University, Riyadh, Saudi Arabia, from January 2016 to July 2021.

Earlier in his career at Khulna University, he held several key academic and administrative positions, including Dean of the Science, Engineering and Technology School (2010–2012) and multiple terms as Head of the Physics Discipline (2009–2012; 2012–2015). He also served as Head of the Electronics and Communication Engineering Discipline between 2002 and 2003.

Khan joined Khulna University as a Lecturer in Physics in 1994 and was promoted through the ranks to Assistant Professor (1999–2002), Associate Professor (2002–2006), and Professor (from 2006). Prior to joining Khulna University, he served as a Lecturer in the Department of Physics at Khulna University of Engineering and Technology (KUET) from 1992 to 1994.

== Research and contributions ==
Khan’s research interests include theoretical physics, high energy physics and Health and Radiation Physics. He has published extensively in national and international journals, with more than 130 research articles indexed in reputed databases.

Khan completed a postdoctoral fellowship between 2003 and 2005 at Tokyo Institute of Technology and the High Energy Accelerator Research Organization (KEK), Japan. He has extensive international research experience, including long-term collaboration with the Belle Collaboration, an international high energy physics experiment involving researchers from multiple countries.

He has been recognized among the leading scientists of Khulna University and has been listed among top-ranked scientists in Bangladesh according to global academic rankings. His publications have received significant citations (12800), as reflected in his Google Scholar profile.

Khan has also served as a Regular Associate at the Abdus Salam International Centre for Theoretical Physics (ICTP), Italy, from 2003 to 2010. He has led collaborative research initiatives involving institutions such as King Saud University, Bangladesh Atomic Energy Commission, and Khulna University.

Over the course of his career, he has supervised numerous postgraduate students, including several PhD and master’s theses, and has been involved in multiple nationally and internationally funded research projects. He has also participated in more than 50 international conferences, seminars, and workshops, contributing to the global scientific community.

== Contributions and leadership ==
Khan has held a number of important academic and administrative leadership roles at Khulna University and in international institutions. Since October 2024, he has been serving as the Pro-Vice-Chancellor of Khulna University, alongside responsibilities as Chairman of multiple selection committees, including those for lecturers, assistant professors, and university officers.

At Khulna University, Khan has served in several key leadership capacities over the years, including Head of the Physics Discipline (2009–2012; 2012–2015; 2023–2024), Dean of the Science, Engineering and Technology School (2010–2012), Director of the Research and Innovation Center (2008–2010), and Provost of Khan Bahadur Ahsanullah Hall (2001–2003).

He has also contributed to academic governance through roles such as Chairman of the Advisory Editorial Board of Khulna University Studies and Estate In-Charge of the university since 2024.

Internationally, Khan served as Coordinator of the PhD comprehensive examination in the Department of Physics and Astronomy at King Saud University from 2016 to 2021, contributing to postgraduate academic administration.

In addition to his administrative leadership, Khan has maintained active engagement in research and scholarly activities, contributing to the academic community through publications and supervision, as reflected in his research profile.
