= Mahmood Hossain =

Bangladeshi academic

- মাহামুদ হোসেন
- Born: 1971 (age 54–55); Morrelganj Upazila, Bagerhat District, Bangladesh

Academic background
- Education: University of Chittagong BSc.; University Putra Malaysia MSc, PhD

Academic work
- Institutions: 12th Vice-Chancellor of Khulna University

Mahmood Hossain (Bengali: মাহমুদ হোসেন; born 1972) is a Bangladeshi academic and university administrator. A specialist in the ecology of mangroves and the Shorea robusta forest of Bangladesh, he was serving the 12th Vice Chancellor of the Khulna University.

== Early life and education ==
Hossain was born on 22 August 1972 in Morrelganj Upazila of Bagerhat district. He is the only son of Dr Mozammel Hossain who was the 5 times elected parliament member of Bagerhat-1 and Bagerhat-4. He completed his secondary education at Bagerhat Government High School in 1987. He finished a Bachelor of Science at the University of Chittagong in 1993. In 1998 he obtained a Master of Science in the field of ecology from University Putra Malaysia and a PhD in 2004 from the same institution.

== Career ==
Hossain began his career as an Assistant Conservator of Forests in 1997 at Department of Forestry, Bangladesh. In January 1999, he was appointed Lecturer in Forestry and Wood Technology, Khulna University. He was promoted to Associate Professor and Professor in 2005 and 2009, respectively. He established the first soil archive in Bangladesh at Khulna University. Dr Hossain has been named as one of the world's best scientists in the AD Scientific Index 2021. He is ranked first in both agriculture and forestry among Khulna University's scientists, and separately in the forestry category, fourth among forestry scientists in the country, 151st among Asian scientists and 825th among scientists around the world.

Prof Md Mahmood Hossain joined Khulna University as Vics-Chancellor on 25 May 2021 and resigned from the post on 20 August 2024
