= Dastagir Hossain Nira =

Bangladeshi footballer (1965–2026)

- Nira in 1988

Personal information
- Full name: Golam Dastagir Hossain Nira
- Date of birth: 6 July 1965
- Place of birth: Khulna, East Pakistan, Pakistan (present-day Bangladesh)
- Date of death: 3 January 2026 (aged 60)
- Place of death: Khulna, Bangladesh
- Position: Left-back

Senior career*
Years	Team	Apps	(Gls)
1983–1986	Victoria		
1987–1989	Adamjee		
1989–1991	Brothers Union		
1991–1992	Dhaka Abahani		
1993	Dhanmondi Club		
1994–1995	Mohammedan		

International career
1988	Bangladesh U16		
1988	Bangladesh U19		
1989	Bangladesh	4	(0)

Managerial career
- 2017–2022: Muktijodhha SKC (assistant)
- * Club domestic league appearances and goals

Dastagir Hossain Nira (Bengali: দস্তগীর হোসেন নীরা; 6 July 1965 – 3 January 2026), also spelled Dostogir Hossain Neera, was a Bangladeshi footballer who played as a left-back for the Bangladesh national team in 1989.

== Early life ==
Nira was born in Khulna on 6 July 1965.

== Club career ==
Nira began his career in the Dhaka First Division Football League with Victoria Sporting Club, which he initially joined after impressing coach, Sheikh Shaheb Ali. He represented Adamjee SSC and Brothers Union before joining Dhaka Abahani in 1991. He was part of the Abahani squad in the 1991–92 Asian Cup Winners' Cup. He won his only league title in the same season with an Abahani team captained by Mohamed Mohsin. He retired after playing for Mohammedan SC in 1995.

== International career ==
Nira represented Bangladesh in youth level at the 1988 AFC U-16 Championship in Bangkok and 1988 AFC Youth Championship qualification in Dhaka. In 1987, he was included in the Bangladesh national team for the 1987 Quaid-e-Azam International Tournament in Lahore. He represented Bangladesh Green (national B team) in the 1989 President's Gold Cup in Dhaka. He eventually featured for the national team in the 1990 FIFA World Cup qualification – AFC first round held in 1989, appearing in four matches.

== Coaching career ==
Nira served as the assistant coach of Muktijoddha Sangsad KC until 2022. He also did grassroots coaching in Khulna, with Khulna City Academy.

== Death ==
Nira died on 3 January 2026, while undergoing treatment in the Medical College Hospital in Khulna, after suffering a cardiac arrest. He was 60.

== Honours ==
Dhaka Abahani

- Dhaka First Division League: 1991–92
