= Khulna Government College =

Art of ministry

Khulna Govt. College, Khulna
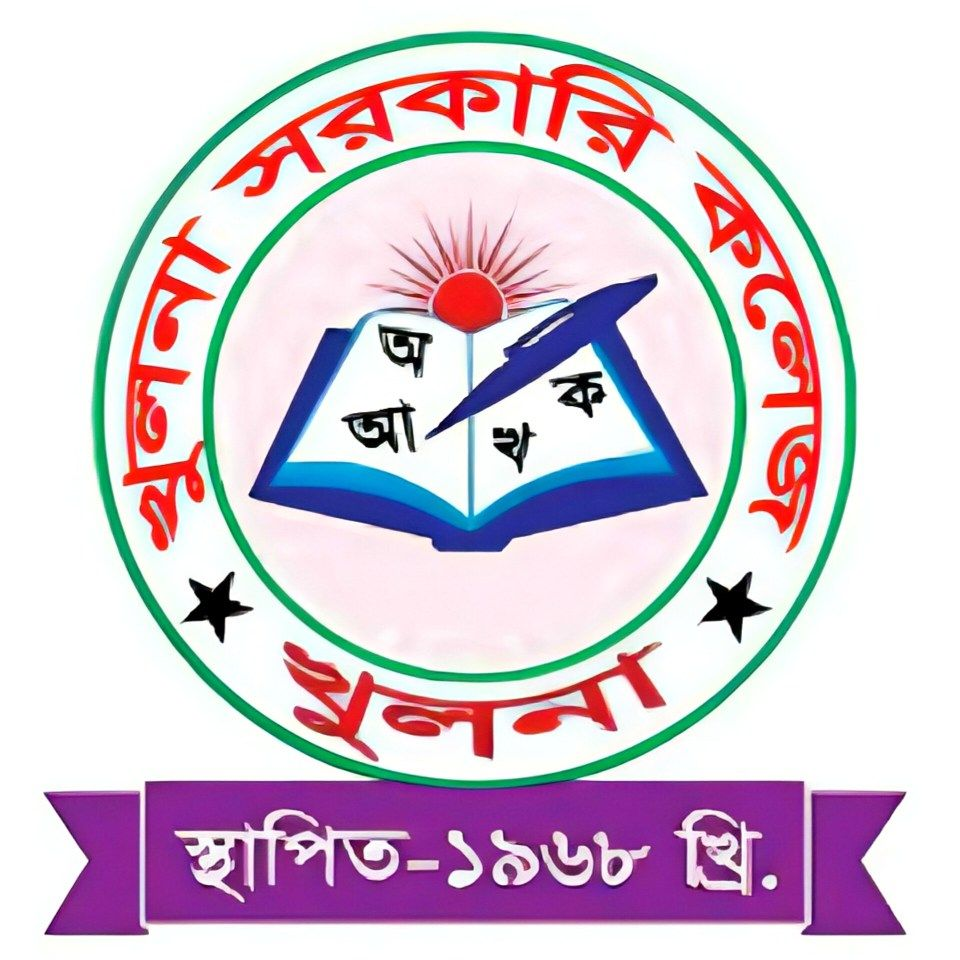
- The logo of the institution
- Former names: Government Commercial Institute, Khulna (1968-2016); Khulna Govt. College(2016-2019); Govt. Joybangla College, Khulna (2019-2025); Khulna Govt. College(2025 to Current)
- Motto: Come in search of knowledge, return to serve the nation
- Type: Public College
- Established: 1968; 58 years ago
- Founder: Government of the People's Republic of Bangladesh
- Principal: Professor Dr. SM Ali Ashraf
- Students: approx. 1200+
- Location: Sonadanga Thana, Outer Bypass Road, Bangladesh; 22.8248°N 89.5390°E
- Colors: Dark Pastel Blue (Shirt); Black (Pants)
- Nickname: KGC
- Website: khlgcedubd.org

Khulna Government College, Khulna is a public educational institution located in Khulna, Bangladesh. Established in 1968, it is affiliated with the Board of Intermediate and Secondary Education, Jashore. On 29th July 2025, the Interim Government of Bangladesh changed the name of the college from Government Joybangla College, Khulna to Khulna Government College.

== History ==
The college was established in 1968, and is the only government-run institution in the larger Khulna region dedicated to business education. Initially named "Khulna Government College," the institution's name was changed to its current title on 16 September 2019 through a notification from the Ministry of Education of Bangladesh. Although On 29th July 2025, the Interim Government of Bangladesh changed the name of the college from Government Joybangla College, Khulna to Khulna Govt. College.

The college was established following the directives of the 1959 National Education Commission of East Pakistan, which aimed to set up 'Govt. Commercial Institutes' in 16 district capitals. Consequently, with financial and technical assistance from the United States Agency for International Development (USAID), the government founded commercial institutes in the cities of Dhaka, Mymensingh, Faridpur, Chittagong, Feni, Comilla, Khulna, Jessore, Kushtia, Rajshahi, Dinajpur, Rangpur, Bogura, Pabna, Barisal, and Sylhet between 1965 and 1967.

The college was founded in 1968.

== Campus ==
The college campus is situated on Outer Bypass Road in the Sonadanga Thana area of Khulna. It houses one academic building, with facilities such as classrooms, laboratories, a library, and a sports ground.

This college has an academic building.

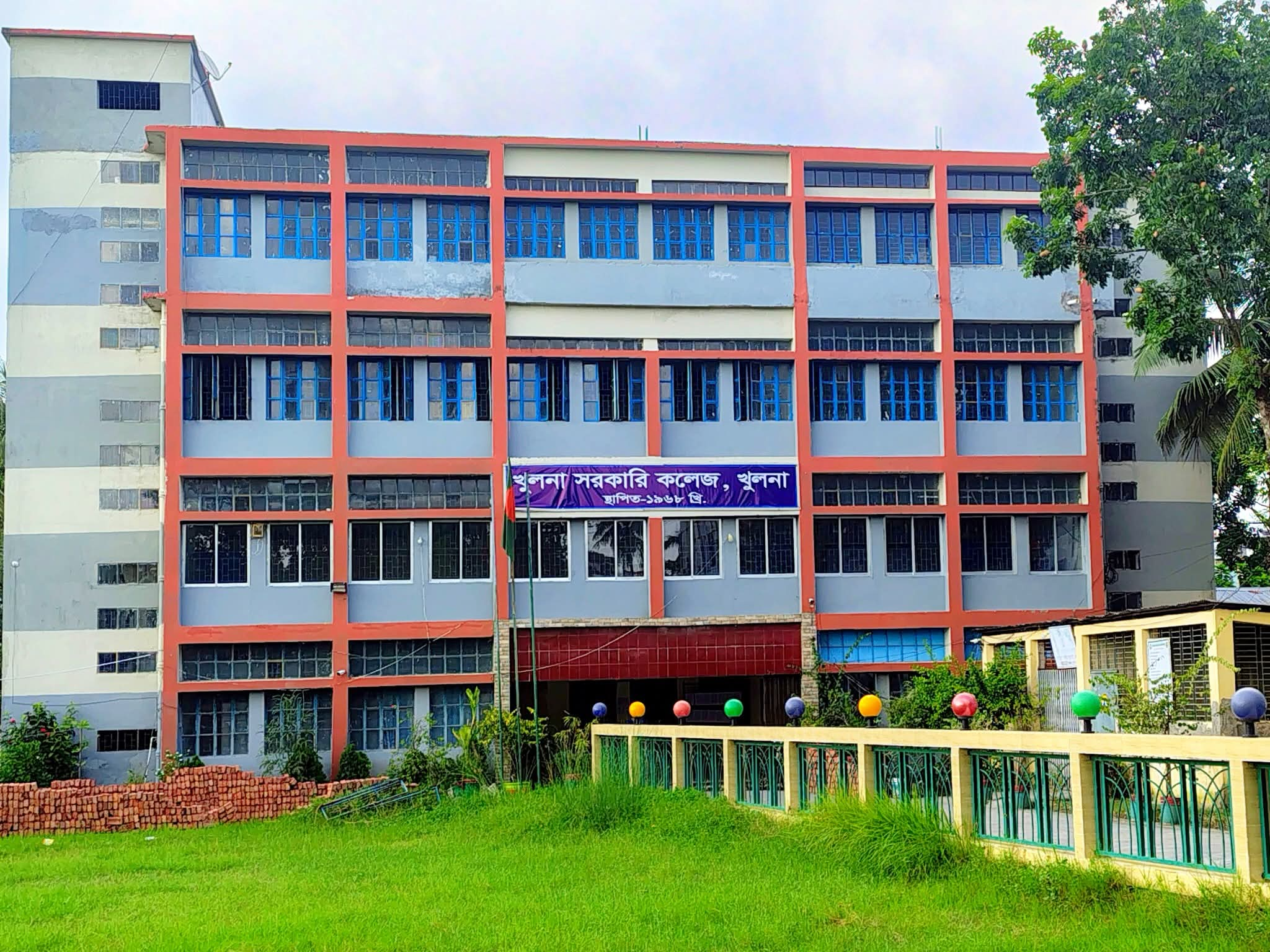

== Courses ==
The college offers programs in the following disciplines:

- Department of Arts
- Department of Science
- Department of Commerce

== Students and faculty ==
The college serves over 1,200 students and employs more than 25 faculty members, providing education in various fields. It has infrastructure to support both male and female students. The college has more than 25 teaching staff members across various departments.

== Sports ==
Students of Khulna Govt. College engage in various sports activities, including:

- Football
- Cricket

== See also ==
- Education in Bangladesh
