= Khulna Medical University =

Government medical university in Khulna, Bangladesh

- খুলনা মেডিক্যাল বিশ্ববিদ্যালয়
- Other name: KMU
- Former names: Sheikh Hasina Medical University, Khulna (2021-2025)
- Type: Government Medical University
- Established: 2021 (5 years ago)
- Affiliations: University Grants Commission
- Chancellor: President Mohammed Shahabuddin
- Vice-Chancellor: Rafiques Salehin
- Location: Sher E Bangla Road, Nirala (Temporary), Khulna, Bangladesh; 22.8020°N 89.5547°E
- Campus: Urban
- Mascot: Royal Bengal Tiger 🐅
- Website: kmu.ac.bd

Khulna Medical University is a government medical university situated in Khulna, Bangladesh. It has been established for the supervisors of all medical colleges and nursing colleges of Khulna Division.

== Affiliated colleges ==
Public

- Khulna Medical College, Khulna
- Jashore Medical College, Jashore
- Kushtia Medical College, Kushtia
- Satkhira Medical College, Satkhira
- Magura Medical College, Magura

Private

- Gazi Medical College, Khulna
- Khulna City Medical College, Khulna
- Ad-Din Akij Medical College, Khulna
- Ad-Din Sakina Woman's Medical College, Jashore

=== Nursing College ===
- Asian Nursing College, Khulna
- Khulna Momota Nursing College, Khulna
- Khulna Nursing College, Khulna
- Nargis Memorial Nursing College, Bagerhat
- World Nursing College, Magura

== Background ==
Khulna Medical University established in Khulna division to supervise whether these public and private medical institutions will be functioning properly. In this, Khulna Medical University will be responsible for the medical and dental colleges, nursing colleges, institute of health technology (IHT), medical education institutes.

== History ==
The Prime Minister's Office (PMO) approved the proposal of establishing Sheikh Hasina Medical University in Khulna.

The Act No. 06 of 2021, Sheikh Hasina Medical University, Khulna Act, 2021, was enacted, and it commenced operations with the affiliated educational institutions of the Rajshahi Medical University in the Khulna region.

After the fall of the Sheikh Hasina-led Awami League government through an uprising, on 13 April 2025, the interim government of Bangladesh issued an ordinance naming the university from Sheikh Hasina Medical University, Khulna to Khulna Medical University.

== List of vice-chancellors ==
- Md. Mahbubur Rahman (2021 – 2025)
- Md. Ruhul Amin (2025 – 2026)
- Rafiques Salehin (2026 - Present)
