= Jashore Medical College =

Government medical school in Jashore, Bangladesh

- যশোর মেডিকেল কলেজ
- Logo of Jashore Medical College
- Other name: JMC
- Former name: Jessore Medical College
- Type: Public medical school
- Established: 2010; 16 years ago
- Academic affiliations: Khulna Medical University; University of Rajshahi
- Principal: Abu Hasanat Md. Ahsan Habib
- Location: Medical College Road, Horinar Beel, Jessore, Bangladesh; 23.169°N 89.209°E
- Campus: Urban
- Website: https://jmc.gov.bd/

Jashore Medical College (Bengali: যশোর মেডিকেল কলেজ) (Formally: Jessore Medical College) is a government medical school in Bangladesh, established in 2010. It is located at Horinar Beel near Chanchra New Bus Terminal in Jashore District.

It provides 5 year MBBS degree and it offers all the opportunities of advanced medical science. One-year internship after graduation is compulsory for all graduates. The degree is recognized by the Bangladesh Medical and Dental Council.

== History ==
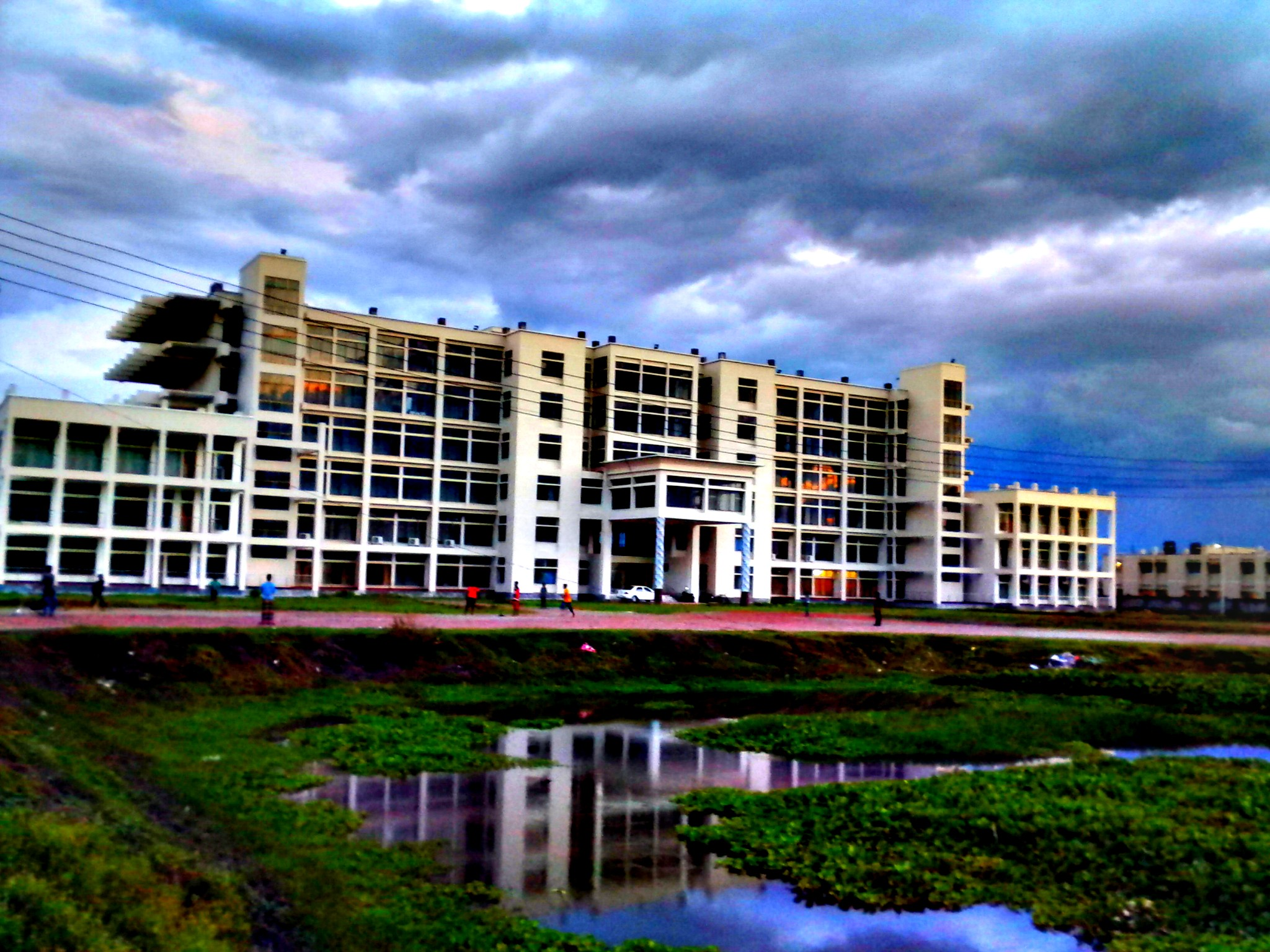
Jessore Medical College Academic Building

The government felt the need for more medical colleges for medical education facilities. The government started establishing medical colleges at notable districts. As a result, Jessore Medical College was established in 2010. Jessore Medical College is continuing its hospital activity at Jessore 250 Beds General Hospital.

== Campus ==
Jessore Medical College main campus is situated at Horinar Beel near Chanchra New Bus Terminal in Jessore Sadar Upazila.

== Organization and administration ==
Jessore Medical College is affiliated under Rajshahi University & Khulna Medical University. The students receive MBBS degree from Rajshahi University after completion of their fifth year and passing the final Professional MBBS examination. The Professional examinations are held under the university and results are given thereby. Internal examinations are also taken on regular interval namely Card completions, term end and regular assessments.

=== Principals ===
Principal's name	Working period
Abu Hasanat Md. Ahsan Habib	2023–present
Mohidur Rahman	2020–2023
Md. Akhtaruzzaman	2019–2020
Md. Gias Uddin	2018–2019
M. A. Shamsul Arefin	2017–2018
Abu Hena Md. Mahbub Ul Mawla Chowdhury	2014–2017
Enayet Karim	2010–2014

== Admissions ==
From 2023, Jashore Medical College admits 100 students into the MBBS degree programme yearly under the government medical admission test. JMC is under DGHS and curriculum by BMDC (Bangladesh Medical and Dental Council). Like other government medical colleges, to be admitted into Jessore Medical College need to be follow DGHS rules.

The admission test is conducted centrally by Directorate General of Medical Education (nearly 70,000 applicants sat for the medical college entrance examination in Bangladesh). The test comprises a written MCQ exam, which is held simultaneously in all government medical colleges on the same day throughout the country. Candidates are selected for admission based on national merit and district, whether they are sons or daughters of freedom fighters and to fill tribal quotas. For foreign students, admission is through the embassy of Bangladesh in their respective countries.

== Clubs ==
- Bangladesh Islami Chhatrashibir, Jashore Medical College
- Avyudoy অভ্যুদয়, ক্রীড়া ও সাংস্কৃতিক সংগঠন
- Sandhani Jessore Medical College Unit.

== See also ==
- List of medical colleges in Bangladesh
