= Sher E Bangla Road =

Road in Khulna, Bangladesh

- Namesake: A. K. Fazlul Huq
- Type: Highway
- Maintained by: RHD
- Length: 4 km (2.5 mi)
- Location: Khulna
- Postal code: 9100 & 9208
- East end: N7
- West end: Khulna City Bypass Road

Sher E Bangla Road is a major road in Khulna, Bangladesh. The road starts from Power House More popularly known where its meets with Upper Jashore Road and ends at Khulna City Bypass Road.

== Description ==
The road originates at Bangabandhu Square popularly known as Moylapota More, then the road continues in a south west direction and meets with N714 near Nirala R/A Beside Khulna Medical University. It then continues in a westerly direction and meets with Outer bypass Road also known as M. A. Bari street in Gollamari. Then it crosses the Mayur River, and crosses Hall road and the Batiaghata road. Then, it goes straight west and meets with Khulna City Bypass Road.

The road is also part of N760 also known as Khulna - Satkhira Road.

== Landmarks ==
- Khulna Medical University
- Khulna University
- Harintana Thana
- Gollamari wholesale Market
- Khulna Evening Market

== See also ==
- List of streets and roads in Khulna
