= Magura Medical College =

Government medical college in Bangladesh

Coordinates: 23.4864°N 89.4217°E

- মাগুরা মেডিকেল কলেজ
- Type: Government medical college
- Established: 2018 (8 years ago)
- Academic affiliations: Khulna Medical University
- Principal: Kamrul Hasan
- Location: Magura, Bangladesh
- Campus: Urban
- Language: English
- Website: www.maguramc.edu.bd

Magura Medical College is a government medical college in Magura, Bangladesh, founded in 2018 and affiliated with Khulna Medical University. The class of the first batch of 50 students commenced on January 10, 2019, at its temporary campus, Magura Sadar Hospital.

== Faculty member ==
Currently there is one principal, 4 professors, 4 associate professosr, 6 assistant professors, and 9 lecturers. There are a total of 24 teachers.

== Housing ==
Provision of safe accommodation and food is ensured through 2 temporary accommodation halls for male students and 1 for female students.
