= Adamya Bangla =

Sculpture in Bangladesh

Adamya Bangla Indomitable Bengal
- অদম্য বাংলা (Bengali)
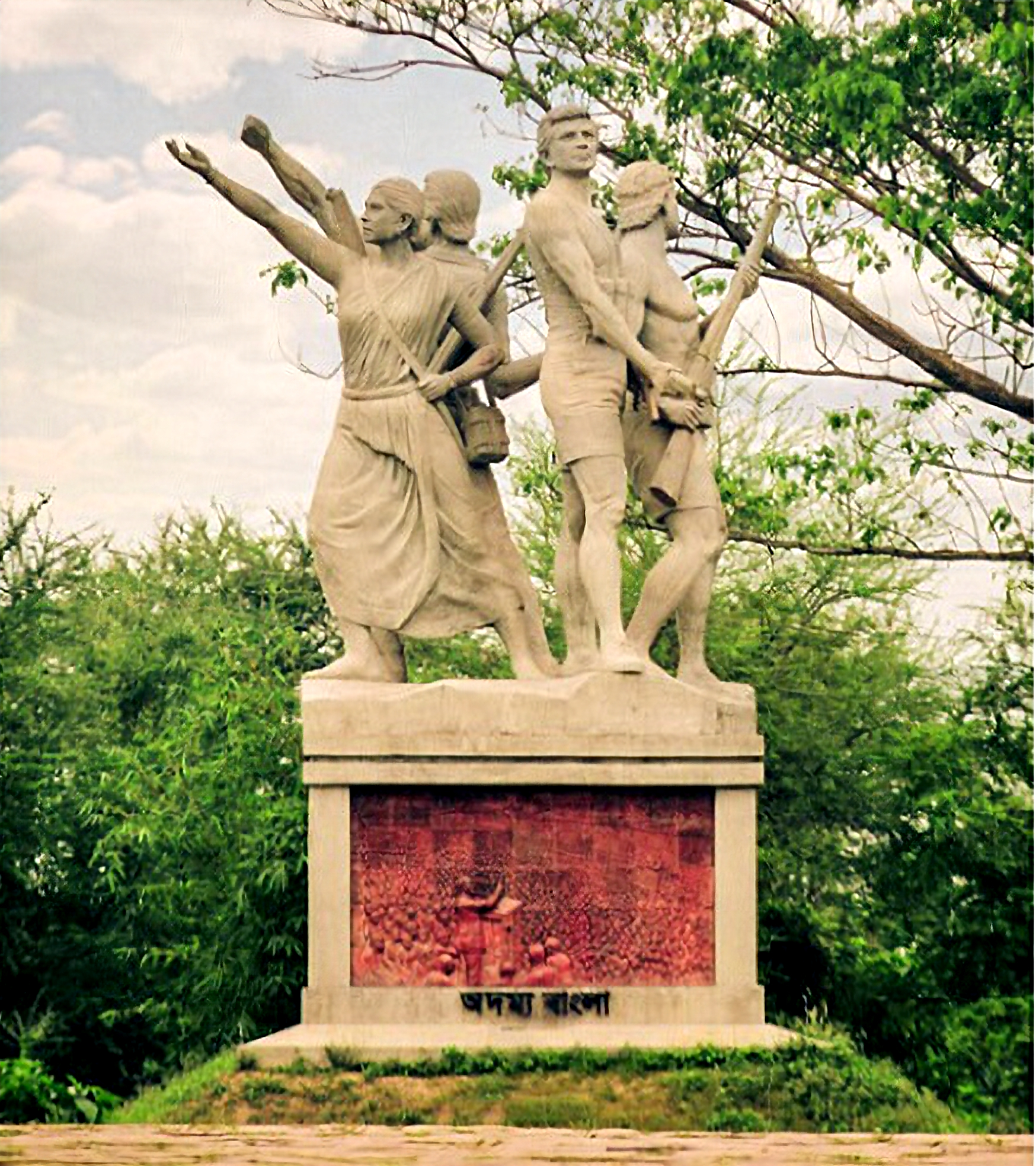
- Adamya Bangla
- Artist: Gopal Chandra Pal
- Year: 2012
- Medium: Sculpture in reinforced concrete
- Subject: Fighters of the Bangladesh Liberation War
- Dimensions: 7.0 m (23 ft)
- Location: Khulna University, Khulna, Bangladesh; 22.802824°N 89.533805°E

Adamya Bangla (Bengali: অদম্য বাংলা) is one of the well known sculptures dedicated to the Bangladesh Liberation War in 1971. It is located in the campus of Khulna University. In Bengali, the phrase means "Indomitable Bengal".

== History ==
The construction of this sculpture started in 2011 and projected cost of 3.9 million taka. But in the end it's hikes to 4.2 million taka. The sculpture finally opened in January 2012.

== Sculpture ==
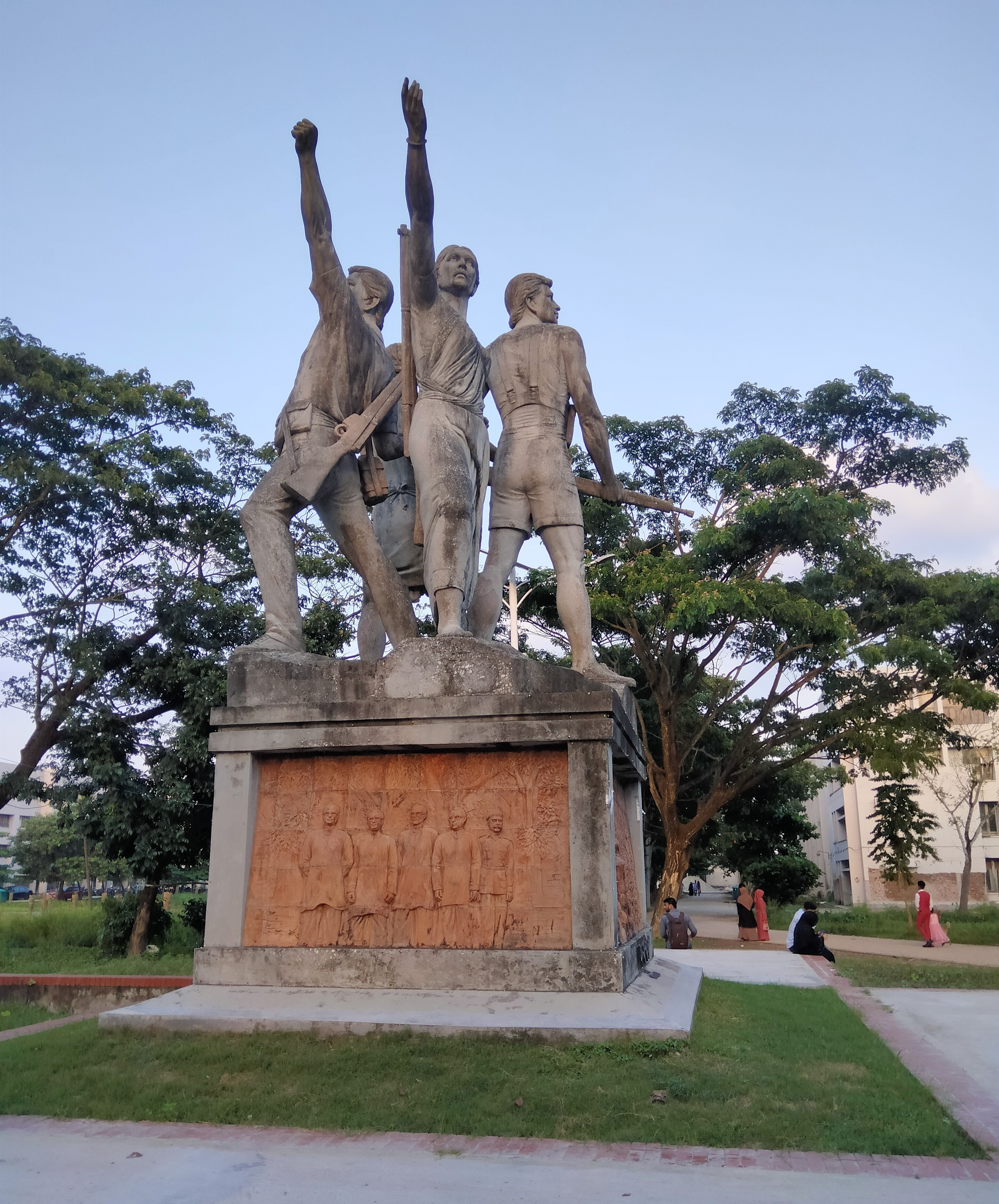
Adamya Bangla

The main part of the sculpture has a portrait of four strong and radiant freedom fighters, including a woman, which is the embodiment of the bravery and courage of the Bengali nation. The sculpture reflects the combined role of the freedom-loving people, both men and women, in the great liberation war. The murals on all sides of the altar depict the historic March 7 speech of the Founder of the Nation Bangabandhu Sheikh Mujibur Rahman, portraits of our four national leaders, the barbarity of the Slaughterhouse and the surrender of the Pakistani occupying forces.
