= Gazi Medical College =

Private medical college in Khulna, Bangladesh

- গাজী মেডিকেল কলেজ
- Type: Private
- Established: 2011; 15 years ago
- Academic affiliations: KMU Khulna Medical University
- Chairman: Gazi Mizanur Rahman
- Principal: Md. Abdul Mannan
- Academic staff: 142 (2025)
- Administrative staff: 105
- Students: 547
- Location: Sonadanga, Khulna, Bangladesh; 22.8175°N 89.5455°E
- Campus: Urban
- Website: gmc.edu.bd

Gazi Medical College (GMC) (Bengali: গাজী মেডিকেল কলেজ) is the first private medical school in Khulna Division of Bangladesh. Its former name was Khulna Surgical and Medical Hospital. Later, in 2011, it became a medical college. Now, it is a 600-bed hospital alongside a reputable medical college with 11 different academic departments. It is located in Sonadanga, Khulna, and is half a kilometre away from the main city bus station. It is affiliated with Rajshahi University, Rajshahi Medical University, and Khulna Medical University under the Faculty of Medicine.

It offers a five-year course of study leading to a Bachelor of Medicine, Bachelor of Surgery (MBBS) degree. A one-year internship after graduation is compulsory for all graduates. The degree is recognized by the Bangladesh Medical and Dental Council.

The college is associated with the 600-bed Gazi Medical College Hospital. MEDISCOPE is the official journal of Gazi Medical College.

== History ==
Gazi Mizanur Rahman founded Gazi Medical College in 2011. Academic activities began in 2012.

The Bachelor of Medicine, Bachelor of Surgery (MBBS) degree program is divided into four parts by the first professional, second professional, third professional, and final professional examinations.

== Campus ==
The college is located in Sonadanga Thana, Khulna, Bangladesh. It has an associated 600-bed hospital, the erstwhile Khulna Surgical and Medical Hospital, which became Gazi Medical College in 2011. There are two different buildings for academic and hospital purposes.

== Organization and administration ==
The college is affiliated with Rajshahi University, Rajshahi Medical University, and Khulna Medical University under the Faculty of Medicine. The founder chairman of the college is Gazi Mizanur Rahman, who is a renowned general surgeon of the city. The principal is Md. Abdul Mannan. The college is recognized by the Indian Medical Council (MCI) and the Nepal Medical Council (NMC).

== Academics ==
The college offers a five-year course of study, approved by the Bangladesh Medical and Dental Council (BMDC), leading to a Bachelor of Medicine, Bachelor of Surgery (MBBS) degree from Rajshahi University, Rajshahi Medical University, and Khulna Medical University. After passing the final professional examination, there is a compulsory one-year internship. The internship is a prerequisite for obtaining registration from the BM&DC to practice medicine. The academic calendar runs from January through December. In October 2014, the Ministry of Health and Family Welfare capped admission and tuition fees at private medical colleges at a prescribed amount, which may change by the government of Bangladesh for their five-year courses applicable for Bangladeshi students.

Admission for Bangladeshis to the MBBS programmes at all medical colleges in Bangladesh (government and private) is conducted centrally by the Directorate General of Medical Education (DGME). It administers a written multiple choice question exam simultaneously throughout the country. Candidates are admitted based primarily on their score on this test, although grades at Secondary School Certificate (SSC) and Higher Secondary School Certificate (HSC) level also play a part. Admission for foreign students is based on their SSC and HSC equivalent to O/10 Level and A/12 Level/grades. As of December 2015, the college is allowed to admit 100 students annually including 45 foreign students. Mediscope is the official journal of Gazi Medical College.

== See also ==
- List of medical colleges in Bangladesh
