= Feni District =

District of Bangladesh in Chittagong Division

Feni District ফেনী জেলা
- District of Bangladesh
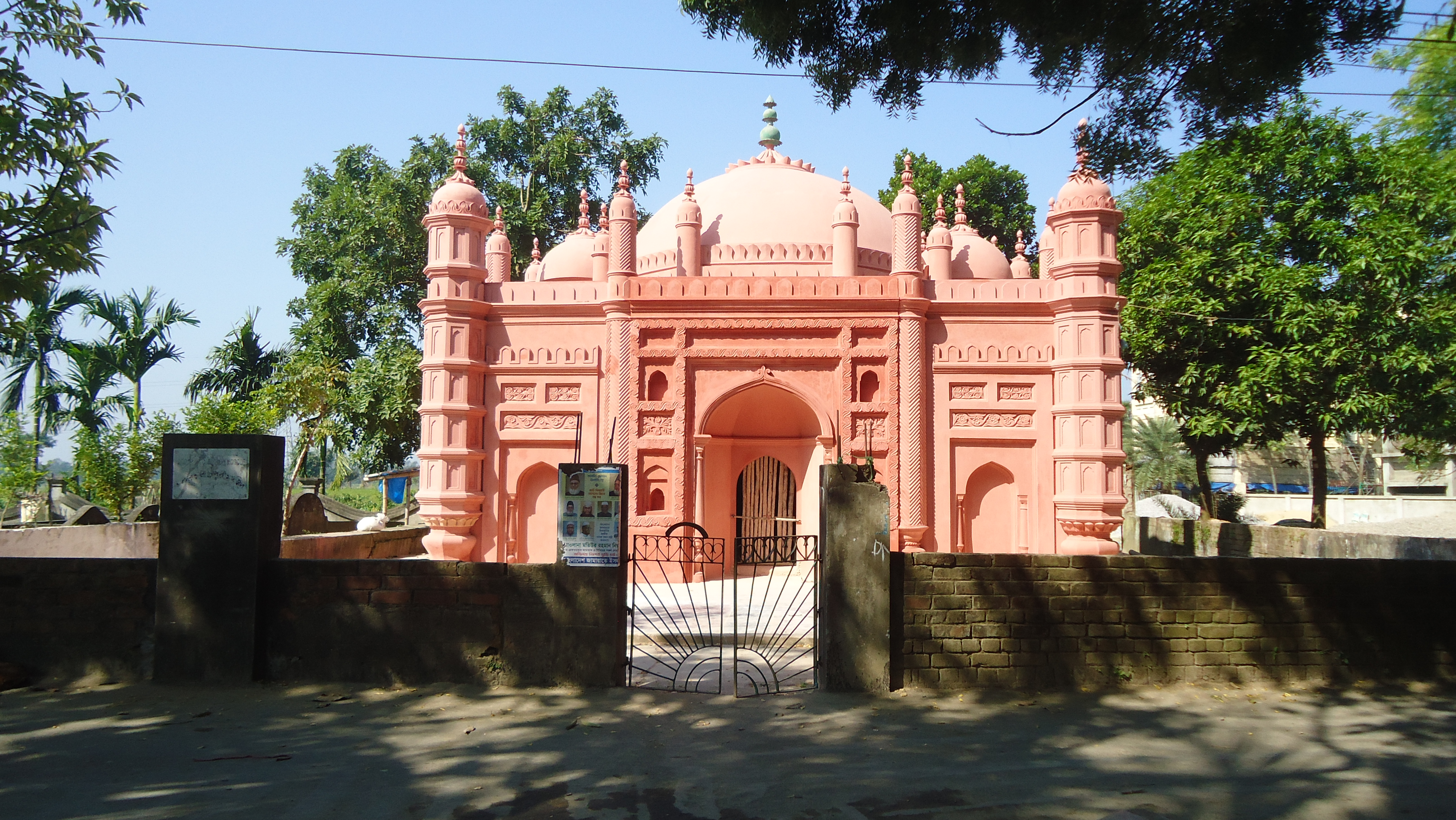
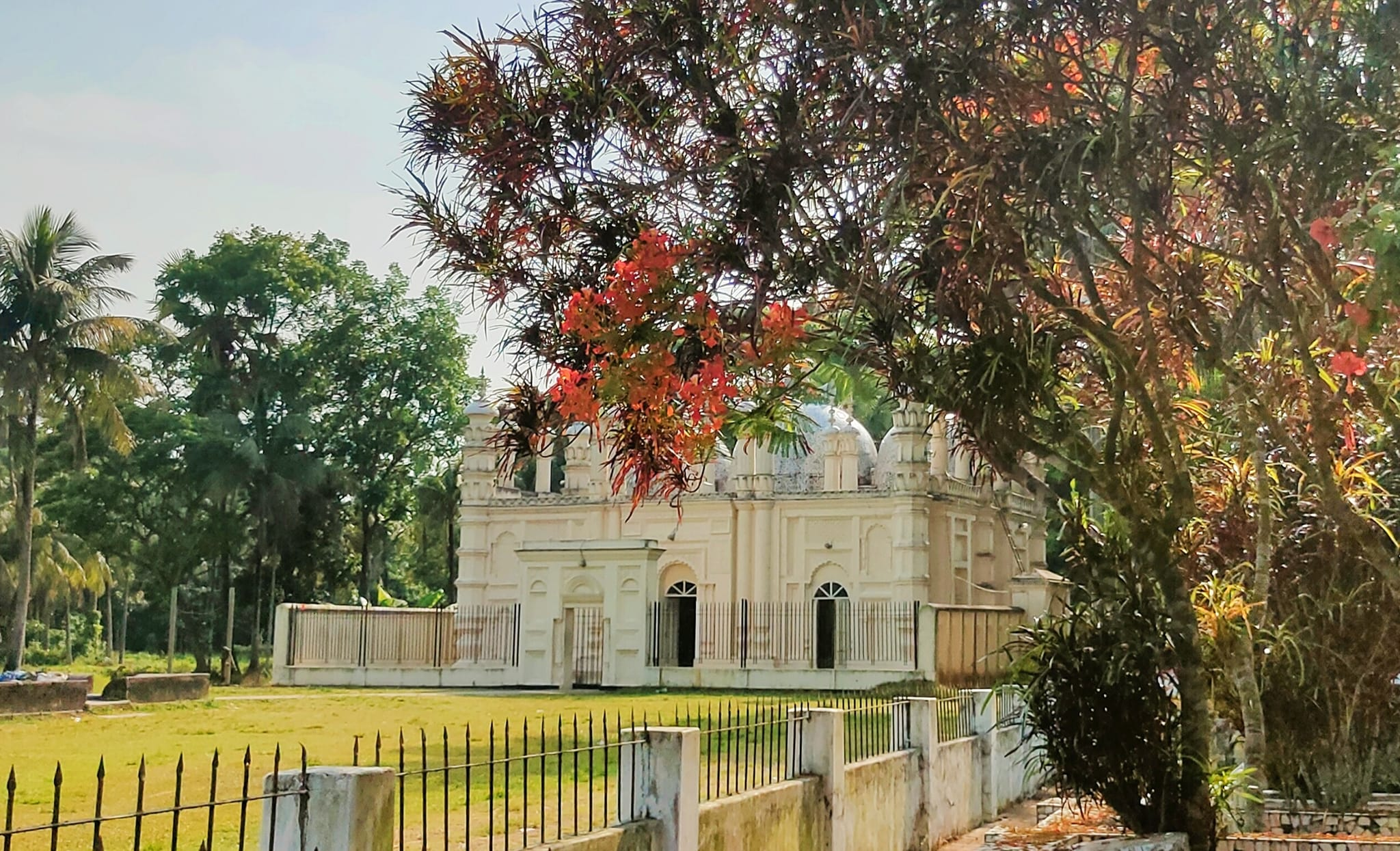
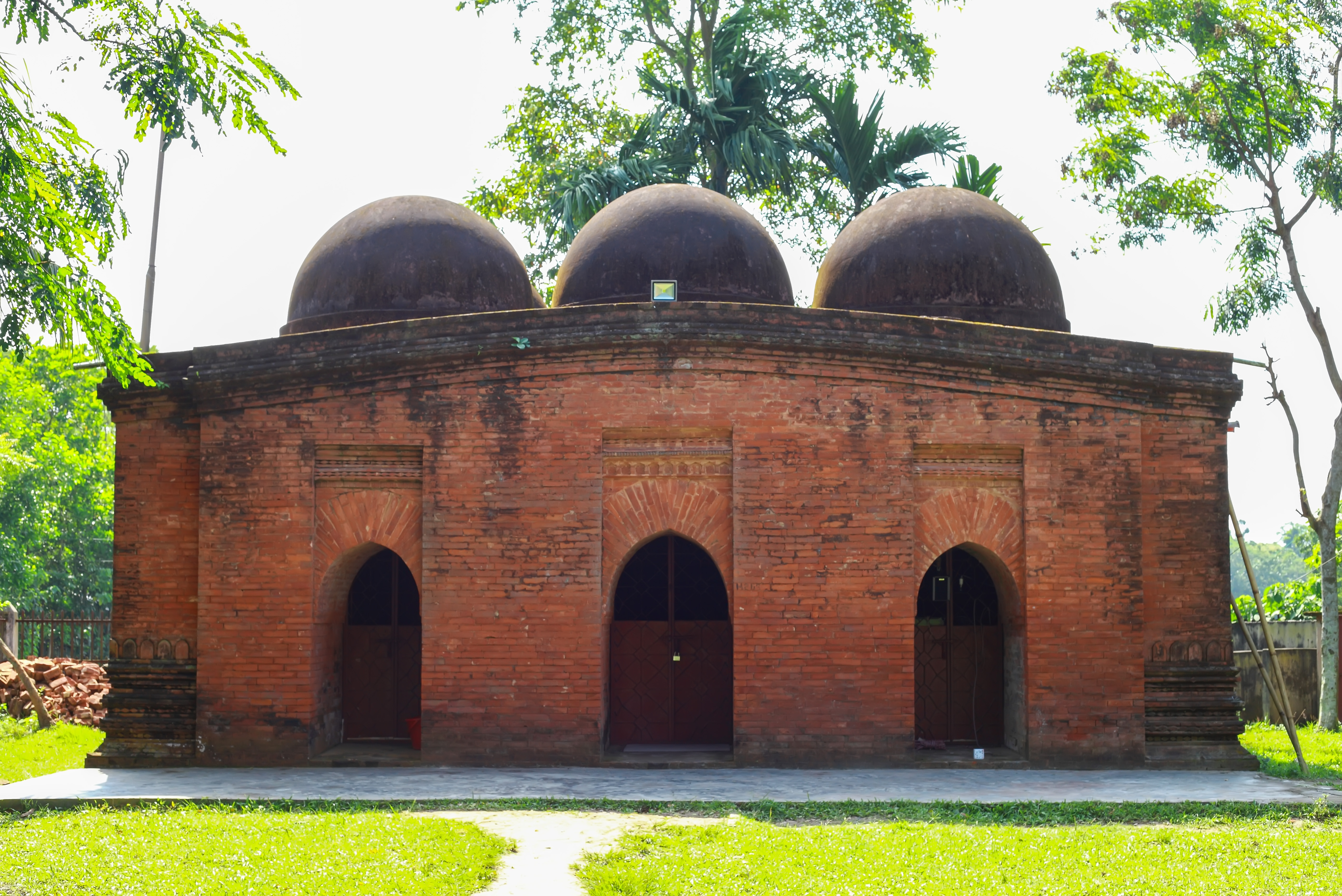
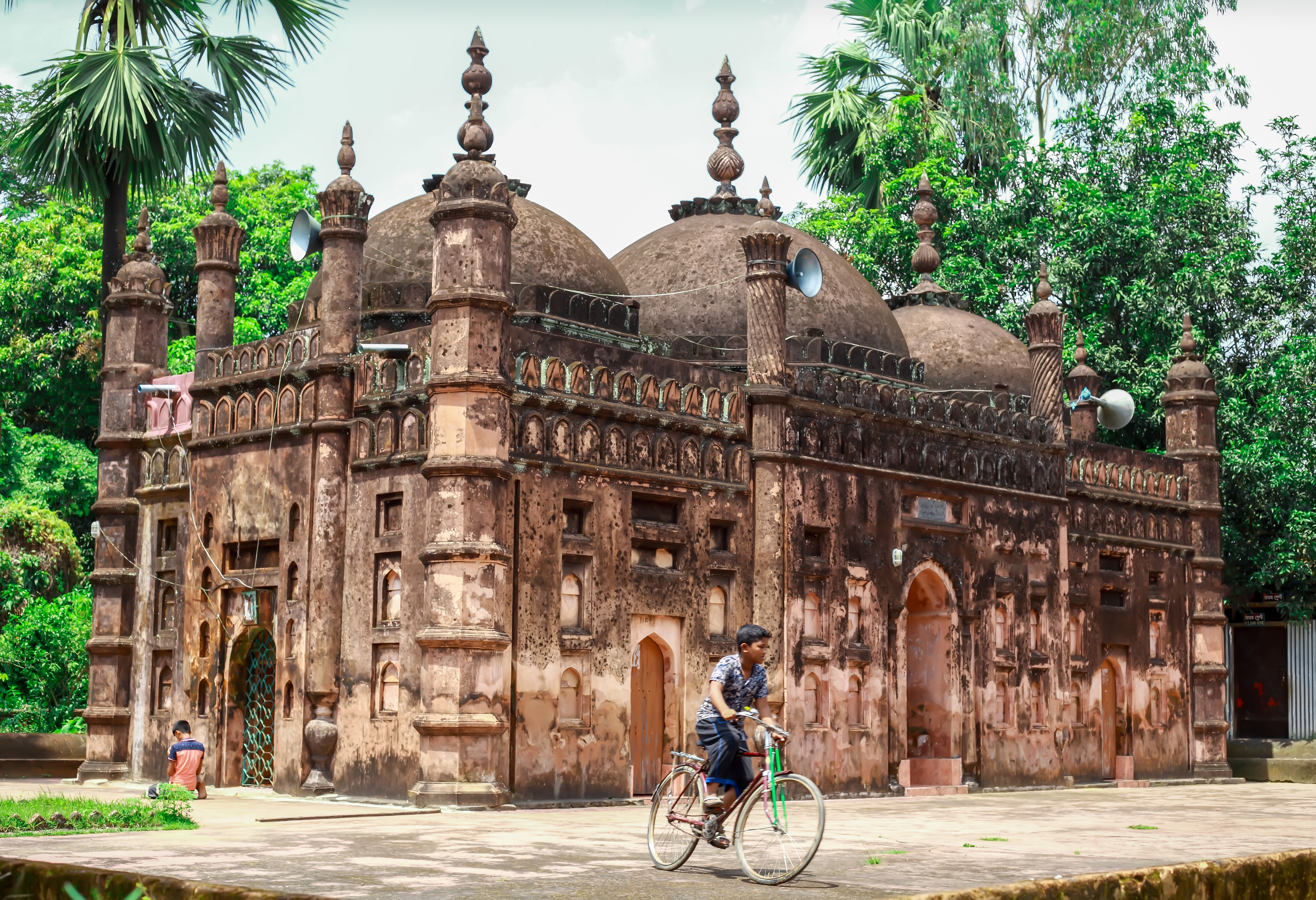
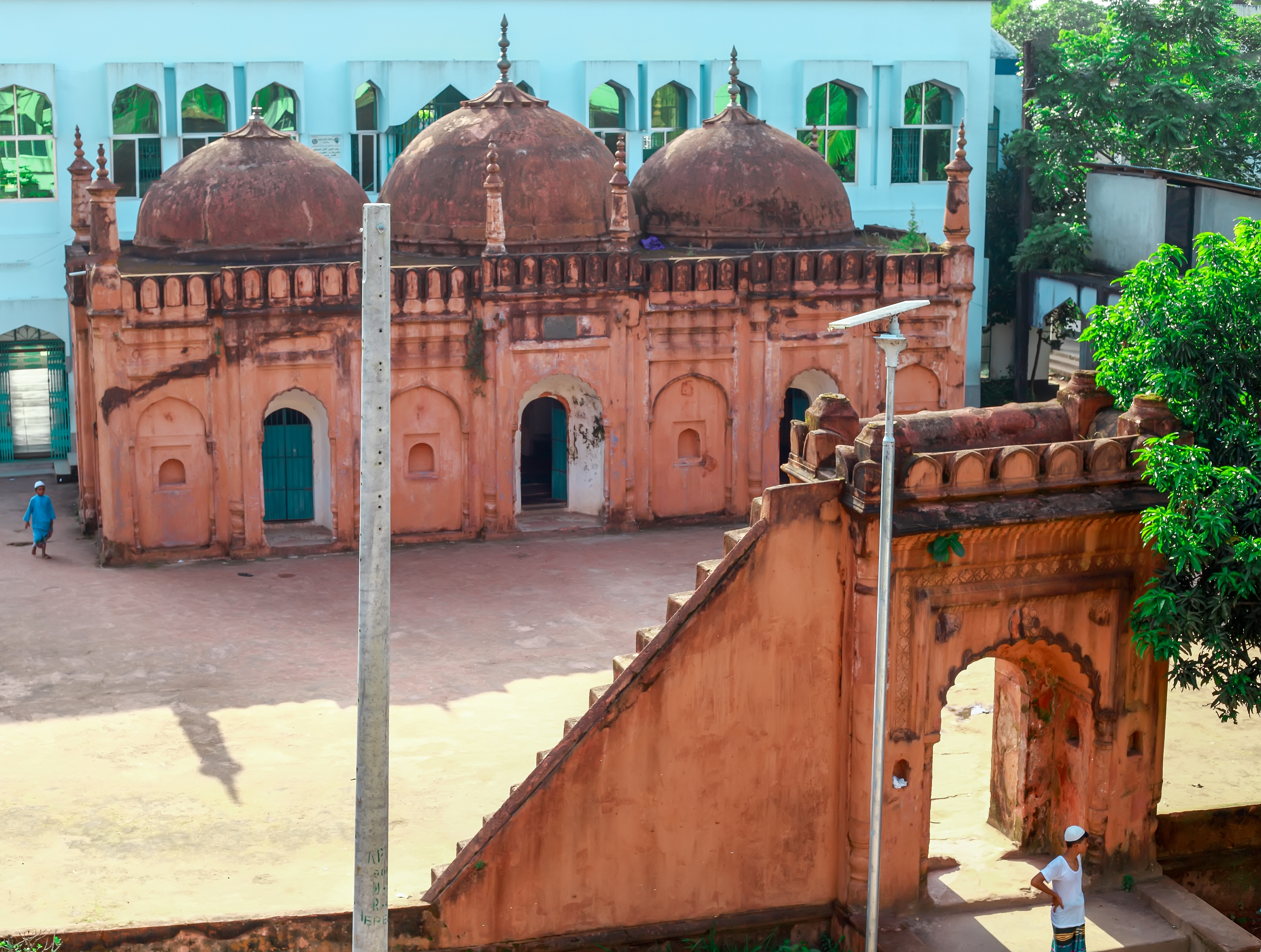
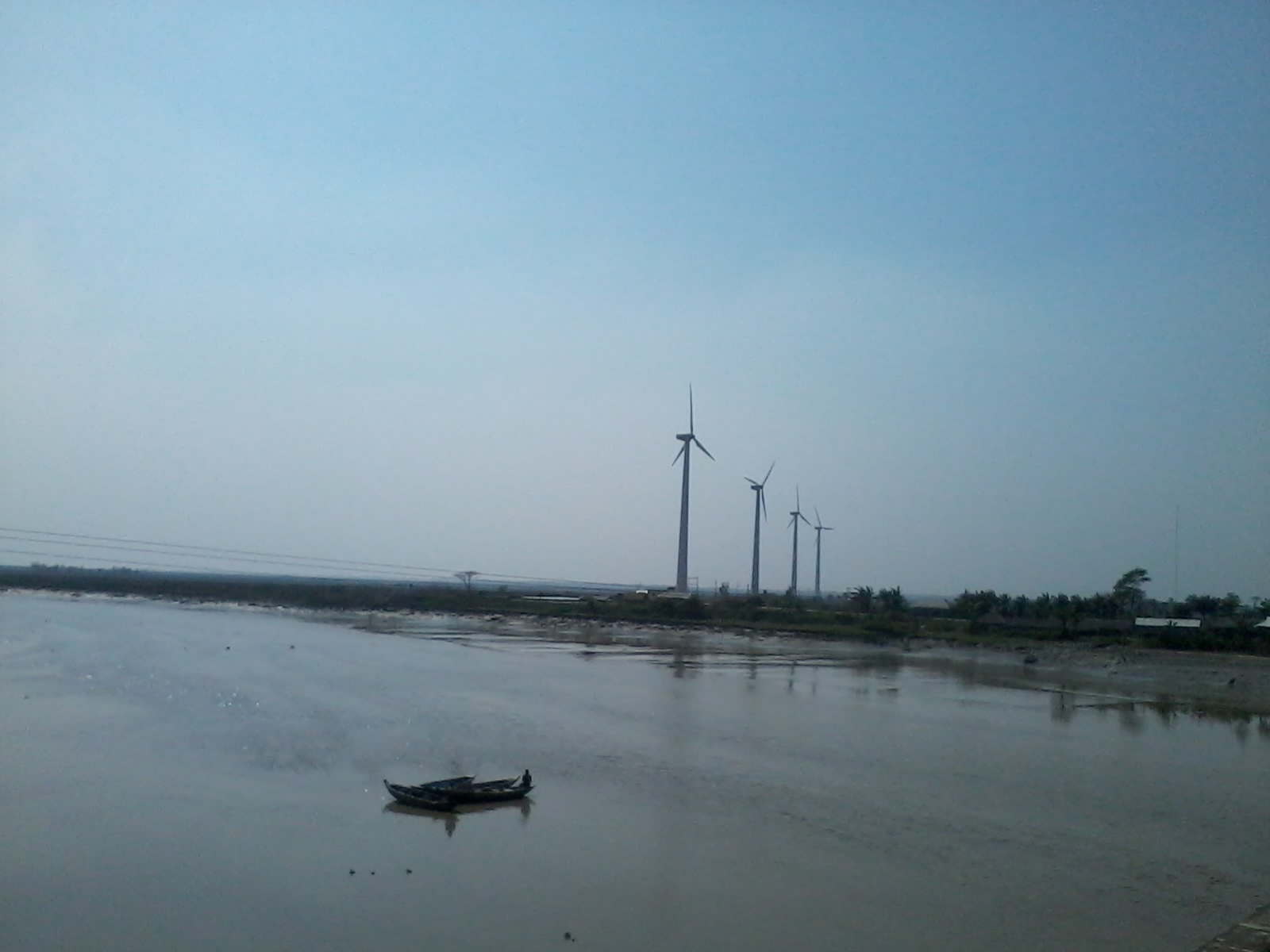
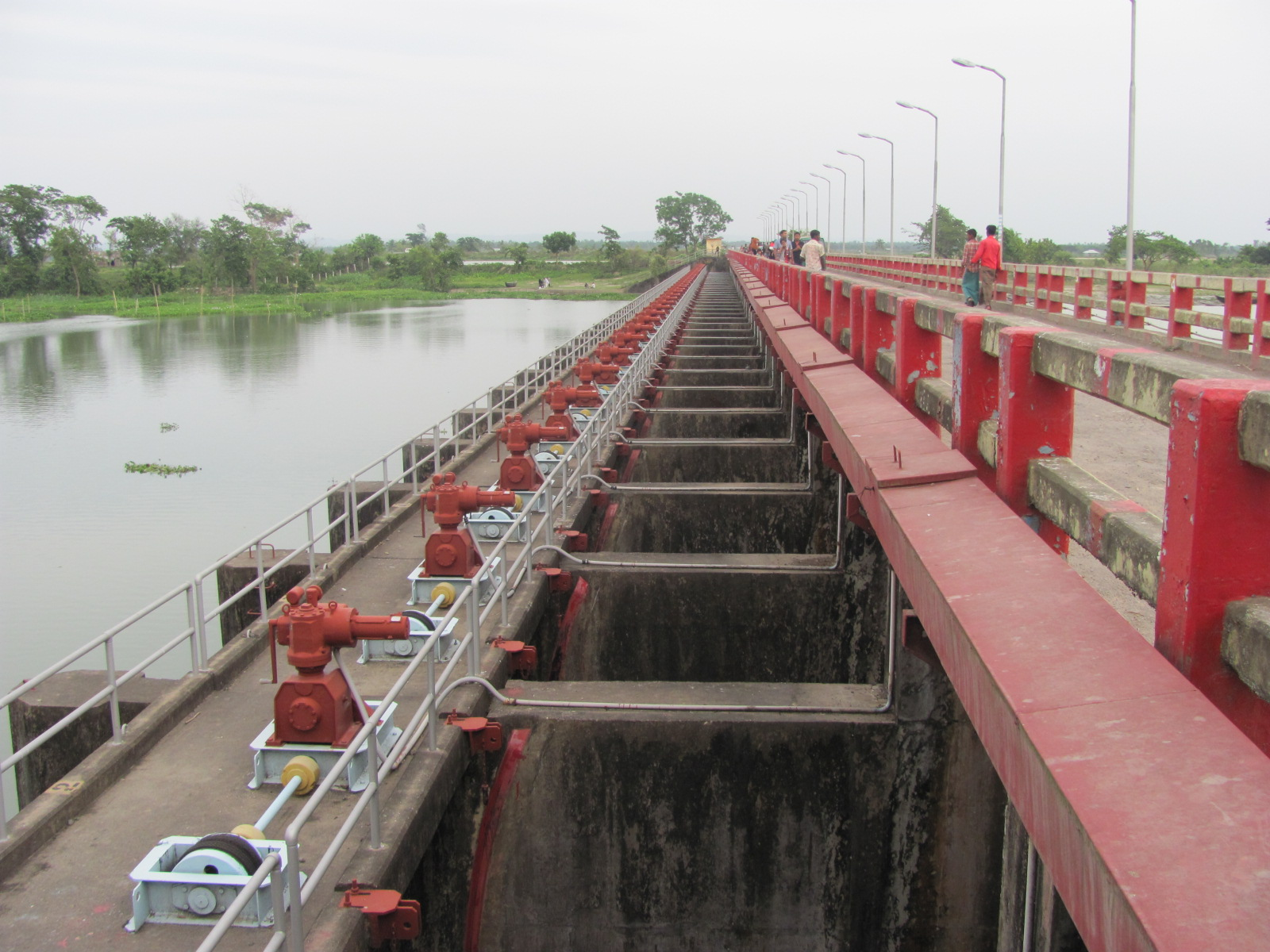
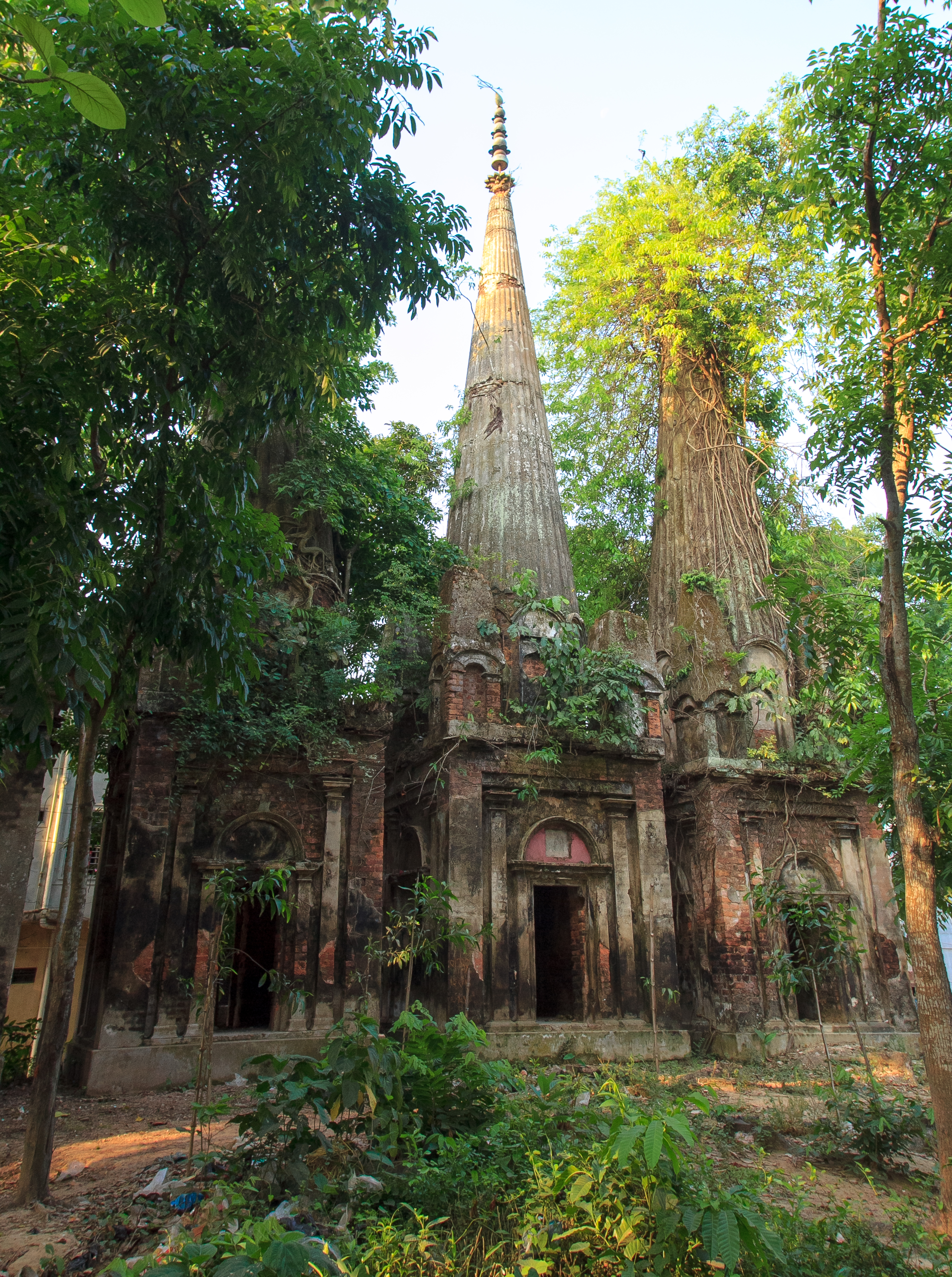
- From top: Asgar Ali Chowdhury Mosque, Ramnagar Chowdhury Bari Jame Masjid, Sharshadi Shahi Mosque, Chandgaji Bhuiyan Mosque, Mohammad Ali chowdhury mosque, Wind electricity-Muhuri Project and Feni ShathMoth

- Location of Feni District within Bangladesh
- Interactive map of Feni District
- Coordinates: 23°00′N 91°24′E
- Country: Bangladesh
- Division: Chittagong Division
- Established as a sub-division: 1876
- Upgraded to a district: 1 March 1984 (as the 64th district and split from Noakhali District)
- Named for: Feni River
- Headquarters: Feni, Bangladesh
- Upazilas: List of upazilas: Feni Sadar Upazila; Chhagalnaiya Upazila; Parshuram Upazila; Fulgazi Upazila; Daganbhuiyan Upazila; Sonagazi Upazila

Government
  - Type: Commissioner–council government
  - Deputy Commissioner: Saiful Islam

Area
  - Feni District: 928.34 km^{2} (358.43 sq mi)

Population (2022)
  - Feni District: 1,648,896
  - Density: 1,665/km^{2} (4,310/sq mi)
  - Urban: 489,230
  - Rural: 1,159,666
  - Feni Municipality: 234,357

Demographics
  - Sex ratio: 898.7 males per 1000 females
- Time zone: UTC+06:00 (BST)
- Postal codes: 3900–3903 (Feni Sadar), 3910–3913 (Chhagalnaiya), 3920–3923 (Daganbhuiyan), 3930–3933 (Sonagazi), 3940–3941 (Parshuram), 3942–3943 (Fulgazi)
- Area code: 0331
- ISO 3166 code: BD-16
- HDI (2023): 0.661 medium · 18th of 22
- Notable sport teams: NoFeL SC
- Website: www.feni.gov.bd

Feni District (Bengali: ফেনী জেলা) is a coastal district situated in the south-east of Bangladesh, within Chittagong Division. One of Bangladesh's smallest districts, it is strategically located along the Dhaka–Chittagong transportation corridor. Bordered by India to the north and the Bay of Bengal to the south, it serves as the sole entry point linking Chittagong, the country's primary port city, to the northern districts.

The district's population stood at 1.6 million in 2022, ranking 42nd among 64 districts and 4th least populous in Chittagong Division. Established as Bangladesh's 64th district in 1984 with its administrative hub in Feni city, it was previously a sub-division under Noakhali District. The district comprises six upazilas (sub-districts): Sonagazi, Fulgazi, Parshuram, Daganbhuiyan, Chhagalnaiya and Feni Sadar.

Deriving its name from the Feni River, the district has a rich history spanning five millennia, having been historically part of the greater regions of Noakhali, Comilla, and Tripura. It was ruled by ancient kingdoms before coming under the Muslim rule of the Delhi Sultanate in the 14th century, and later the Mughals from the 17th century, when it briefly served as a frontier settlement with thriving cities. The British gained control in the late 18th century, formally establishing Feni as a sub-division in 1876. Significant infrastructure development, including schools, colleges, roads and railways, occurred in the early 20th century. Feni's students played a vital role during Bangladesh's language movement in the mid-20th century and subsequent independence war, ultimately gaining independence from Pakistan on 6 December 1971.

== Etymology ==
While there are disagreements surrounding the matter, it is generally believed that the settlement of Feni derived its name from the river of the same name, rather than the other way around. The origin of the name "Feni" itself is surrounded by various local legends, complicating efforts to determine its true source. However, most legends commonly suggest that the name is connected to the word phoni (Bengali: ফনী, meaning "snake").

The evolution of the word "Feni" or pheni is evident in historical texts spanning several centuries. Writers and poets in the 15th and 16th centuries wrote about the area, referring to the word phoni as both a river stream and a ghat for ferry crossing. (Note: Poets like Jatadhar Bhattacharya and Kavindra Parameshwar made references to the Phoni River in their descriptions of settlements.) The emergence of the word pheni appears to be evident in the language of Muslim poets and writers, (Note: In the 18th century, poets such as Ali Raza Kanu Fakir and Muhammad Muqim mentioned Feni in their writings.) such as the 17th-century Persian book Baharistan-i-Ghaibi, where the reference to the two pheni rivers (Note: Likely referring to the Feni River on the east and the Little Feni River on the west) indicates the transformation of the word phoni into pheni or Feni.

== History ==
=== Early history ===
The Feni region, situated in eastern Greater Noakhali (historically known as Bhulua), is believed by scholars to have an ancient history, despite its relatively recent addition to the country's administrative landscape. Historical records indicate the presence of human settlements dating back five thousand years ago within this region.

According to folklore, this area was once home to a flourishing society that settled near the legendary seas of Billasagar or Sukh Sagar, showcasing the region's deep-rooted past. Scholars trace the arrival of Aryans to the Ganges Delta near Feni, marking a significant epoch in its history. (Note: Mentioned in the Mahabharata, King Phoni, a vassal during the Kuru-Pandava wars, is believed to have ruled over ancient southeastern Bengal under the kingdom of Pundravardhana or another prominent king of North Bengal. It is thought that his capital was located in the present-day Feni region.) Prehistorical discoveries in Feni dating back to the kingdom of Gangaridai further underscore Feni's importance, suggesting it may have served as a vital frontier settlement during ancient times. Historical records point to the governance of a 7th-century dynasty as part of the Samatata region. Archaeological findings suggest the presence of the Chandra dynasty, which ruled over Samatata. Additionally, evidence indicates the possible rule of the Pala Empire in Feni, notably under King Mahipala II, after whom modern Mahipal is named. The Feni-Noakhali region was part of the ancient Paṭṭikera Kingdom, possibly serving as a trade route connecting the kingdom with Burma (present-day Myanmar). The artificial lake called বিজয়সিন, bijoysen in Mahipal reflects the era of Vijaya Sena's rule, belonging to the Sena dynasty. During the 13th century, the kingdom of Bhulua emerged, encompassing the area that comprises the present-day Noakhali region.

=== Arrival of Islam and Muslim rule ===
During the medieval era, the arrival of Sufis from Arabia and Central Asia profoundly influenced Bengal's coastal regions. Promoting values of tolerance and love, they amalgamated Islamic teachings with local customs, shaping a distinctive cultural identity. By the onset of the Middle Ages, Muslims formed the majority in the Noakhali region, despite the absence of Muslim rule.

During the rule of Muhammad bin Tughluq, eastern Bengal came under the Delhi Sultanate's jurisdiction. Under the governance of Bahram Khan, who ruled over eastern Bengal during the Tughlaq dynasty, the Bhulua or Greater Noakhali region was administratively linked to Sonargaon, one of the three administrative divisions of Bengal within the Delhi Sultanate. Ships laden with salt would depart from the ports of Bhulua and Jugidiya for overseas destinations.

Following Bahram's demise in 1338, Fakhruddin Mubarak Shah proclaimed the independence of eastern Bengal at Sonargaon. After the establishment of the independent Sultanate of Sonargaon, Fakhruddin set up a military camp in Feni while aiming to conquer Chittagong, overseeing the construction of a mosque and excavation of a reservoir in the region. In an effort to enhance connectivity within his realm, he contributed to the construction of a lengthy highway from Chandpur to Chittagong, passing through Comilla and Feni. In later times, a significant portion of this old highway in the Feni region was incorporated into the Dhaka–Chittagong Trunk Road.

During a period of instability in Bengal, the rise of Tripura as a regional power saw its king extending control over parts of Feni, Comilla, and Sylhet, capitalising on the opportunity presented by Raja Ganesha's seizure of power in Bengal.

In historical accounts, it is suggested that Rasti Khan, who served under Ruknuddin Barbak Shah, governed areas extending from Feni to the northern regions of Chittagong. Additionally, during the medieval period, the Kingdom of Tripura exerted significant influence over the Feni and Comilla regions, with the eastern part of Feni being part of the district of Tripura during the British colonial period, which also encompassed the modern district of Comilla.

During the medieval era, a nobleman belonging to the Sur Dynasty named Nizam Shah established a kingdom called Jafarabad along the banks of the Feni River. During the reign of Mughal Emperor Akbar, territorial disputes arose between the Kingdoms of Tripura and Arakan, with Arakan initially seizing control of Chittagong and extending influence up to the Feni River. Following conflicts, Mogh settlements were established in southern Feni-Noakhali, but they fled when the Mughals conquered Chittagong in 1666, who also drove out Portuguese settlers in the region who arrived in late 16th century.

=== Mughal era and rule of the Nawabs ===
Greater Noakhali fell under Mughal rule after they invaded the Bhulua Kingdom—which stretched as far as a portion of Comilla—and ousted its king Ananta Manikya in 1611, led by Subahdar Islam Khan. To ensure control over the newly acquired territories, the Mughals set up a police station (thana), serving as the administrative hub of the area, at the mouth of the Feni River in Jugidiya. Its jurisdiction extended over significant portions of present-day Sonagazi and Companiganj. This station served as the frontier outpost of the Mughal province of Bengal in the far southeast during that period, facing repeated attacks from the Arakan Kingdom.

The Feni region was pivotal during the Mughal conquest of Chittagong, acting as the border with Arakan-held territory. Having been under Mughal control for fifty years, Feni was strategically fortified along the riverside to repel potential Arakanese attacks. After the Mughal conquest of Chittagong, they established a thriving city called Amirgaon in southern Feni, but it was eventually swallowed by the Feni River.

After the death of Aurangzeb's, the Mughal Empire began to fragment, leading to the rise of Nawabs in Bengal in the early 18th century. Nawab Murshid Quli Khan, seeking to boost tax revenue, divided Feni's largest pargana (administrative unit). Under his rule, the East India Company established a textile mill in southern Feni's Jugidiya area. Toward the Nawab era's end, a new administrative unit, Chakla Roshnabad, was formed, spanning parts of Sylhet and Comilla, extending to the Feni River's southern bank. Shamsher Gazi, who ruled Chakla Roshnabad, emerged as a notable figure, significantly influencing Feni's history.

=== Influence of the East India Company ===
Long before the Battle of Plassey, which handed control of Bengal to the East India Company, a French company (Note: Likely referring to the French East India Company) established a significant textile mill in Jugidiya, a hub for various industries, near the mouth of the Feni River. In 1765, the East India Company gained the authority to collect taxes in Jugidiya and other areas by becoming the official tax collector (diwan) for the Mughal emperor, thereby legitimizing its control over the region.

In 1770, the East India Company's ineptitude and exploitative tax policies precipitated a severe famine. Concurrently, the coastal Feni-Noakhali region was devastated by a catastrophic cyclone and tidal surge, resulting in widespread displacement and destruction. The important settlement of Jugidiya was all but submerged. Despite the implementation of the Permanent Settlement system in 1793, much of Feni-Noakhali remained under direct East India Company control, with armed enforcement of high land revenue collection. In the same year, the Manikya king of Tripura acquired land rights in the Roshnabad estate under the new system, including parts of Feni, compelling anti-English landowners to cede their land.

=== Establishment of Mahakuma ===
During the British colonial period, administrative units known as thanas were established under district collectorates, forming administrative unions within the district. In a subsequent phase of administrative decentralization, the British authorities divided each district into subdivisions called mahakumas. Before the establishment of Feni mahakuma (Note: Formally referred to as Feni Sub-division in census reports, including and before 1981) the Chhagalnaiya and Parshuram thanas (currently upazilas), and Amirgaon thana (Note: Amirgaon Thana encompassed parts of southern and south-eastern regions of Feni District) were part of the Comilla and Noakhali districts respectively. (Note: Initially, the Feni mahakuma encompassed Mirsarai thana of Chittagong district, but Mirsarai was later reunited after two years. Consequently, the Feni River delineated the boundary between Chittagong district and the Feni mahakuma.) In 1876, the Feni mahakuma (sub-division) was established under the jurisdiction of Noakhali District. The sub-divisional headquarters were originally located in Amirgaon, but were moved to Feni town in 1881. Notably, in 1883, Nabinchandra Sen assumed the role of governor of the mahakuma, overseeing significant developments that earned him the moniker of the true architect of Feni. (Note: The headquarters and administrative offices of the mahakuma were relocated near the ancient reservoir known as Rajajhir Dighi, situated close to the Dhaka Trunk Road, an area initially less populated. Under Nabinchandra's leadership, efforts were made to establish a market, seen as pivotal for the emergence of the municipality of Feni, which subsequently evolved around this market. Today, the reservoir remains a significant attraction for the residents of the municipality.) Furthermore, in 1895 and 1920, two pivotal railway lines, namely the Assam Bengal railway and the Feni–Belonia branch line, were constructed, vastly improving Feni's connectivity and contributing to its development. Syed Amir Uddin, also known as Pagla Miah, was a Sufi saint who exerted significant influence in the Feni region during this period, earning recognition as its spiritual architect.

=== History leading up to the partition ===
The districts of Feni and Noakhali played a pioneering role in the Swadeshi (self-reliance) movement, particularly in the boycott of foreign goods during the 1930s. Khadi cloth, produced by local weavers, gained immense popularity in these regions. The demand for a separate homeland for Muslims of the subcontinent, presented at the All-India Muslim League Conference held in Lahore in March 1940, resonated strongly in the Feni-Noakhali region, just as it did in other parts of Bengal. Habibullah Bahar Chowdhury of Feni emerged as a leading figure during this time.

Amidst the escalating tensions of the Pakistan Movement and the Indian independence struggle, Feni gained prominence as a significant military hub in South Asia throughout World War II. Its strategic position led to the creation of an Allied forward base and the construction of a large airstrip, which now forms part of the premises of Feni Girls' Cadet College. Local residents became increasingly agitated as Allied soldiers engaged in acts of violence against women, sparking protests that were met with lethal gunfire. In 1943, Feni endured a Japanese bombing raid during World War II, causing plane crashes and pilot casualties.

As the war concluded and India's independence approached in 1946, communal tensions heightened in nearby regions. Feni's Hindu-majority areas saw limited violence thanks to local intervention. Ultimately, in 1947, the Indian subcontinent gained independence, leading to the partition into Pakistan and India.

=== Post-partition of Bengal ===
Following partition in 1947, Feni, bordered by the Indian state of Tripura, experienced demographic shifts and social hurdles. The king of Tripura's significant land holdings in Feni shaped its socio-economic dynamics. Many Hindu families migrated to Tripura and West Bengal, including professionals, leading to a social void. With Hindu educators departing, the education sector faced crisis, while returning Muslims from India added to unemployment. Post-World War II, Bengali workers returning from Burma worsened economic challenges in Feni.

After partition, Tripura's population grew, prompting new settlements by flattening hills and clearing forests. This led to changes in river courses, causing floods in Feni, endangering agriculture and causing annual crop and resource losses worth crores.

The hastily demarcated Feni-Tripura border by the Radcliffe Boundary Commission led to challenges for local residents. Many farmers found their houses in East Pakistani Feni while their cultivated land remained in Indian Tripura, causing households to straddle two countries. This created the issue of jiratiya, where individuals became citizens of both nations due to the border cutting through their homes.

=== Pakistani rule and the language movement ===
The Muslim League party—the dominant political party of the region—exhibited limited internal democracy and suppressed dissent in Feni, resulting in political, social, and cultural stagnation. However, Feni College emerged as a significant institution during this period. In 1948, it established a student council with a unique democratic structure, featuring direct student elections, unlike the prevalent indirect election systems (through elected representatives) or faculty-appointed bodies elsewhere. These elections sparked discussions among local intellectuals and politicians, encouraging broader public engagement. The elected student council leader became a prominent figure, representing students in social and cultural spheres. Over time, Feni College, through its student council, wielded growing influence on the region's social and political landscape, particularly the language movement of Bangladesh. Following Muhammad Ali Jinnah's declaration of Urdu as the sole national language in 1948, Feni witnessed numerous anti-government movements, notably during the language movement peak in 1952. Despite orders, students organized public rallies and political movements, continuing well into Ayub Khan's military rule. Abdus Salam, a journalist, played a significant role in the language movement of Dhaka and ultimately sacrificed his life for the cause.

After the 1954 legislative elections, Feni underwent a flurry of socio-economic advancements, including the straightening of Silonia and Muhuri rivers (which also saw construction of a dam), digging of Kalidas-Pahalia canal, and development of key infrastructure like bridges and roads. Efforts were made to establish industries such as textile mills, and the town of Feni was incorporated, with initiatives to provide supply of electricity.

Following his release from imprisonment on sedition charges, Sheikh Mujibur Rahman, the founding father of Bangladesh, was permitted to host a rally in Feni during Yahya Khan's rule, marking it as the first area he visited after Dhaka. After his influential speech on 7 March 1971, urging people to take up arms for independence, the people of Feni displayed great enthusiasm by forming a Rastrabhasha Sangram Parishad resistance committee (lit. 'struggle council'), contributing to the preparation for the impending conflict.

=== Bangladesh War of Independence ===
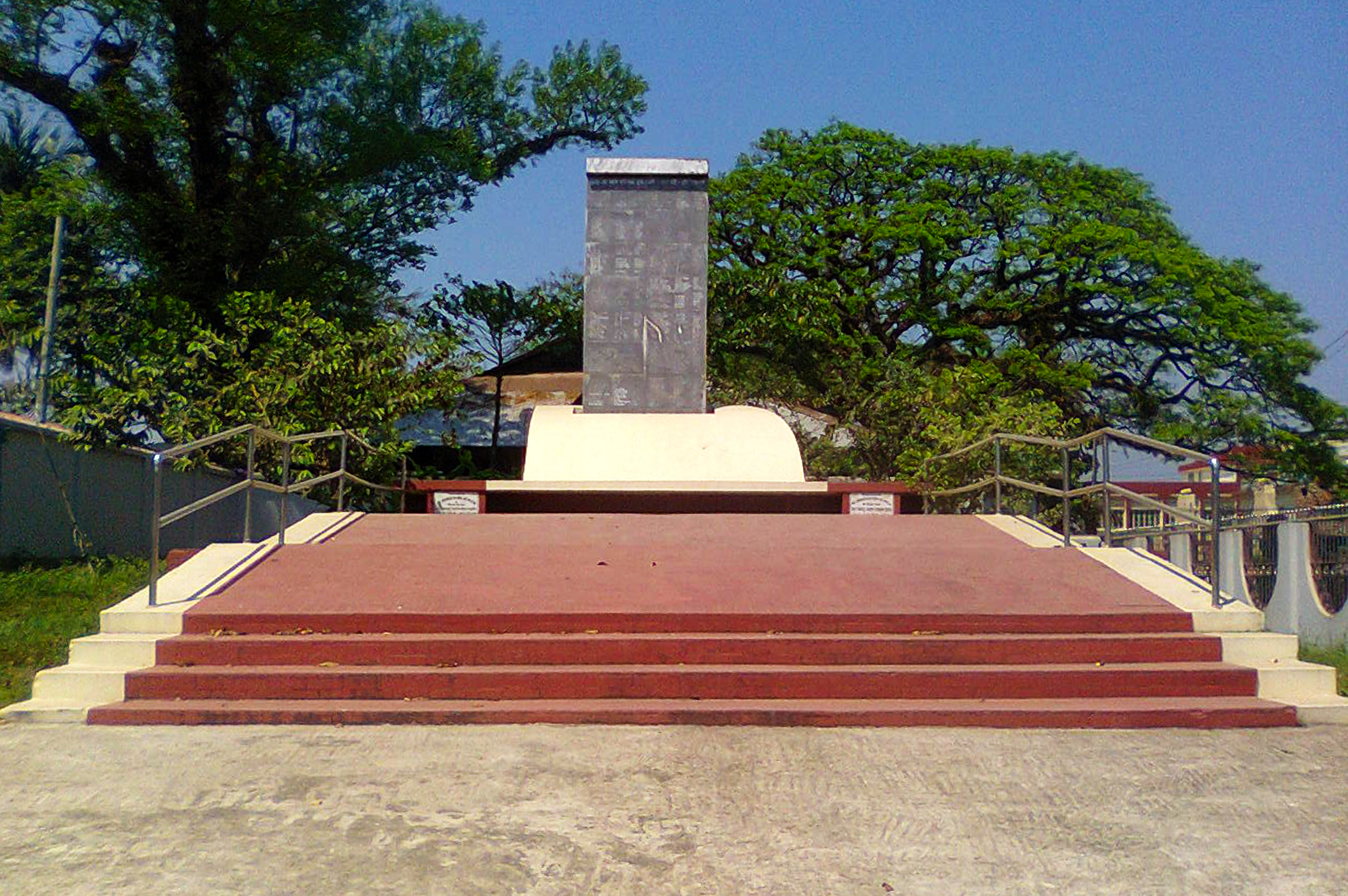
Monument to fighters in Feni city

During the independence war, Feni was a main supply route for the Pakistani occupation forces, serving as a vital line of communication for transporting troops, arms, and ammunition from the port city of Chittagong to the capital city Dhaka and other parts of the country. In the early stages, Khwaja Ahmed, head of the resistance committee, organised a diverse force of Mukti Bahini (lit. 'liberation force') comprising local police, East Pakistan Rifles (now Border Guard Bangladesh) and Ansar members, ex-military personnel, students, and local youth. Notable individuals such as Joynal Hazari, Noor Ahmed Hazari, Joynal Abedin, Jafar Ullah Khan, Mostafa Hossain, and Flight Lt. Abdur Rouf were instrumental in this effort. They established control of Feni town and fortified Shuvapur Bridge to defend against approaching forces from the south. Subsequently, additional support arrived from Chittagong, reinforcing their defensive positions. Intense confrontations ensued around Shuvapur and Gopal Union as Pakistani forces attempted to cross the Feni River, resulting in significant casualties on their side. The control of the Feni River was crucial due to the strategic importance of Shuvapur road bridge and Dhumghat rail bridge as vital transportation links for the district.

Throughout the first phase of the war, Feni remained unoccupied by enemy forces until 22 April. However, desperate to establish communication between Dhaka and Chittagong, the invading forces launched a land attack from the north in Cumilla, eventually gaining control over Feni. After the fall of Feni town, pro-independence fighters retreated eastward to Chhagalnaiya, where they inflicted significant casualties on the invaders and seized arms, despite later facing air attacks. With enemy forces concentrated in Feni town, other parts of Feni, including Sonagazi, were relatively free from occupation, allowing fighters to regain control of strategic routes and achieve victories.

In July and August, local collaborators known as Razakars emerged, committing atrocities such as killings and arson. Feni's proximity to Tripura in India enabled fighters to receive military training and employ guerrilla tactics against the invading forces and their collaborators in the second phase of the war. During the war, notable figures such as Sultan Mahmud, a former officer of the Pakistan Air Force, Salahuddin Mumtaz, Amin Ahmed Chowdhury, and Jafar Imam emerged, contributing significantly to various aspects of the war and Feni's development.

Following Pakistan's invasion of western India on 3 December, India officially recognised Bangladesh, energising the Mukti Bahini, which launched extensive attacks by land, air, and sea on Pakistani positions. Overwhelmed by these assaults, the invading forces retreated towards Cumilla during the night of 6 December, taking with them the non-Bengali governor of the Feni mahakuma. At dawn the next day, the flag of an independent Bangladesh was raised, eliciting cheers from thousands of people across the Feni region. Eventually, on 16 December, the Pakistani forces formally surrendered in Dhaka, marking Bangladesh's attainment of sovereignty and independence.

=== Establishment of the district and post-independence ===
In the late 1950s, discussions began about making Feni mahakuma a separate district. Despite various attempts over the years, including proposals during Sheikh Mujib's tenure and administrative reforms under Ershad's government, no progress was made. However, after persistent local protests, Feni was finally established as the 61st district of Bangladesh on 1 March 1984, encompassing 395 square miles (1,020 km^{2}) of land.

=== July 2024 protests in Feni ===
In July 2024, the anti-quota student movement that originated in Dhaka spread to multiple districts across Bangladesh, including Feni. The movement, widely known as the July Revolution, was triggered by longstanding grievances over public service recruitment policies favouring certain quotas, particularly those reserved for descendants of freedom fighters.

On 17 July 2024, clashes broke out in Feni Sadar between student protesters and members of the Bangladesh Chhatra League (BCL), the student wing of the ruling Awami League. The violence occurred near Doel Chattar and the Shaheed Minar, where BCL activists reportedly blocked and attacked protesters attempting to join demonstrations. At least 20 individuals were injured in the confrontation, including several bystanders.

Following the resignation and departure of Prime Minister Sheikh Hasina on 5 August 2024, widespread unrest erupted in Feni. Mobs attacked three police stations—Feni Model, Daganbhuiyan, and Chhagalnaiya—setting fire to records, vandalising facilities, and looting weapons. The homes of prominent Awami League members, as well as several businesses and cattle farms, were also ransacked. In total, the Feni District Administration officially recognised 10 individuals as martyrs of the July–August uprising. A government-funded memorial, named the July Square, was inaugurated in March 2025 to honour them.

2024 floods

Since 21 August 2024, heavy rainfall, combined with upstream water inflows, has caused severe flooding in several districts of Bangladesh. A low-pressure system over the Bay of Bengal intensified the downpours, affecting the northeastern and southeastern regions of the country, as well as neighboring Indian states like Meghalaya and Tripura. According to reports from the Bangladesh Meteorological Department (BMD) and the Flood Forecasting and Warning Centre (FFWC), some areas experienced over 180 mm of rainfall in three days. This continuous rain, coupled with water released from upstream, caused major rivers such as the Surma-Kushiara, Manu, Khowai, and Feni to overflow, leading to extensive flooding in low-lying districts including Moulvibazar, Habiganj, Sylhet, Feni, Cumilla, Noakhali, Khagrachhari, Lakshmipur, Brahmanbaria, Chattogram, and Cox's Bazar.The information in this report is based on data provided by the Department of Disaster Management (DDM) under the Ministry of Disaster Management and Relief (MoDMR), which has issued detailed damage (D-form) reports on flood losses and damages, as well as daily disaster situation reports from the National Disaster Response Coordination Center (NDRRC).

=== 2025 floods ===
Between 8 and 17 July, heavy monsoon rains—combined with water surges from upstream India—caused devastating floods across Feni District, affecting five upazilas: Feni Sadar, Chhagalnaiya, Daganbhuiyan, Fulgazi, and Parshuram. According to the Department of Agricultural Extension, approximately 5,564.61 hectares (55.6461 km^{2}) of cropland were damaged, resulting in losses of around ৳146.43 crore (US$12 million).

The National Disaster Response Coordination Centre reported that 6,950 families (approximately 29,700 people) remained waterlogged and more than 1,000 homes were partly or completely destroyed. Embankments were breached at 36 points, triggering widespread submergence across the district.

The district's fisheries and livestock sectors sustained significant damage. The Department of Fisheries estimated losses of ৳8.12 crore (US$660,000), while the Livestock Office reported damages totaling ৳64.88 lakh (US$53,000), including losses of poultry, cattle, and fodder.

Relief efforts include distribution of ৳23.5 lakh (US$19,000) in cash, 160 tonnes of rice, and deployment of the Bangladesh Army with boats and life jackets for evacuations and shelter management.

Local officials and residents have urged construction of sustainable embankments (totalling 122 km) and ongoing river dredging to reduce future flood risks.

== Geography ==
Feni is one of the smallest districts of Bangladesh, covering a total area of 928.34 square kilometres (358.43 sq mi). Situated along the strategic Dhaka–Chittagong transportation corridor at Bangladesh's south-eastern border, it serves as the sole entry point linking the country's primary port city of Chittagong to the northern districts, making it a crucial transit point for goods and people moving between the major economic hubs. The district is surrounded by Nangalkot and Chauddagram upazilas of Comilla District, as well as Tripura state of India to the north. To the west and south-west lie Senbagh and Companiganj upazilas of Noakhali District, while Tripura borders it to the east and north-east. Mirsharai Upazila of Chittagong District lies to the south-east, and the estuary of the Feni River at the Bay of Bengal marks the southern border. The finger-like strip of land that juts out into Tripura in the north is called the Belonia Bulge, bordered by India on three sides.

=== Physical geography ===
Feni is characterised by its flat terrain, previously featuring hills, mounds, forests, and jungles primarily in the eastern part of Chhagalnaiya and Parshuram upazilas. In the past, the region around Kalidah featured a large wetland, but with the construction of the Kalidas-Pahalia canal in the 1950s, this wetland has been transformed into cultivable land.

==== Rivers ====
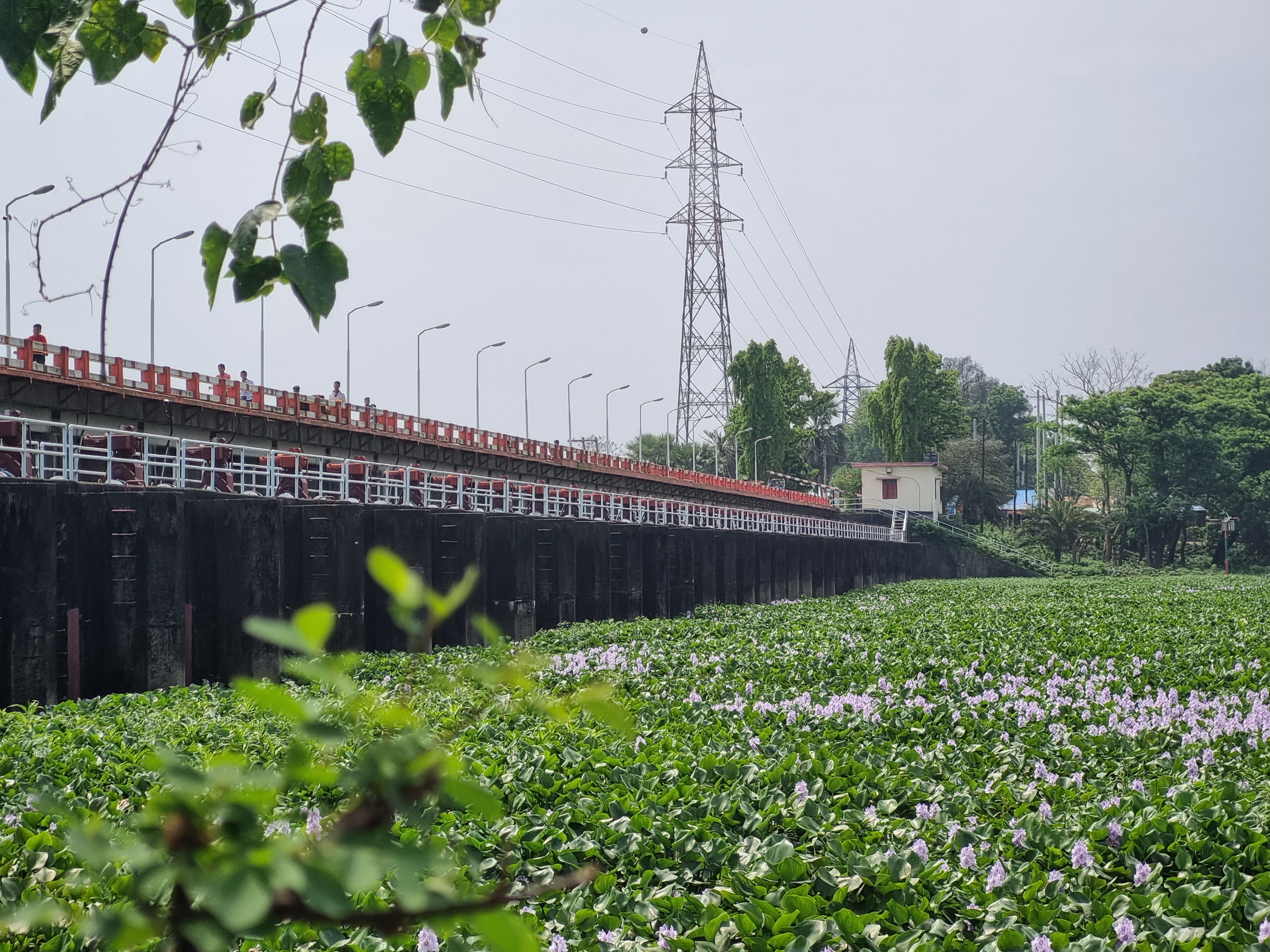
Water hyacinths on the Feni River at Muhuri Project in Sonagazi

Feni is traversed by several main rivers including the Feni River, Little Feni River, Muhuri River, Silonia River, and Kahua River, originating from hilly regions further north in India and flowing southwards into the Bay of Bengal.

The Silonia River, situated in Parshuram Upazila, originates from the hilly regions of the Indian state of Tripura. It eventually merges into the Muhuri River located in Chhagalnaiya Upazila. Along its course, the river traverses through Feni Sadar, Fulgazi, Parshuram, and Chhagalnaiya Upazilas. One branch of the Muhuri River goes further east and then reunites. Locally, this branch is known as the Kahua.

The Dakatia River's branch which enters through Sindurpur of Daganbhuiyan Upazila is referred to as the Little Feni River. This river continues southward and subsequently splits into two, flowing along the western side of Kazirhat and eventually converging into the Bay of Bengal. At the mouth of the Little Feni River, a regulator has been constructed as part of the Kazirhat Sluice Gate irrigation project.

==== Soil ====
The soil composition in Feni District is primarily defined by the presence of Old Brahmaputra floodplain series, primarily olive silty loam and gray soil. Extensive alluvial lands, known locally as চর, chôr, have formed due to the erosion caused by the Feni and Muhuri rivers, resulting in the displacement of numerous settlements. In the northern area of Feni, where small hillocks are situated, the soil is mainly brown and highly acidic.

==== Geological features ====
Approximately 8 kilometres (5.0 mi) south of Feni town lies a subsurface anticline, stretching about 12 kilometres (7.5 mi) in length and 5 kilometres (3.1 mi) in width. In 1981, Petrobangla drilled a gas well within this structure, which was subsequently abandoned in 1998.

==== Climate ====
Feni District has a monsoon climate (Köppen climate classification Am) characterised by warmth and relative equity throughout the year. Summer typically sets in from the middle of April and extends until the middle of June. During this period, the district experiences a maximum mean temperature of 34.5 °C (94.1 °F) and a minimum mean temperature of 12.4 °C (54.3 °F). The level of humidity varies, with a minimum of around 20% in January and reaching close to 100% in July. Additionally, the average annual rainfall in the district is recorded at 3,302 millimetres (130.0 in).

Feni District is highly flood-prone due to its flat, low-lying topography and location along transboundary rivers. The Feni, Muhuri, and Silonia rivers, combined with intense monsoon rains, create conditions for both seasonal and flash flooding. Major flood events occurred in 1998, 2004, 2010, 2017, 2024, and 2025. Feni Municipality faces the highest risk, followed by Sonagazi Municipality and Nawabpur union.

The Muhuri Irrigation Project, established in the 1980s, includes embankments and regulators intended to control river flow and mitigate flooding. However, poor maintenance, siltation, and structural degradation have reduced the effectiveness of these measures. The absence of coordinated water management with upstream India further contributes to the district's vulnerability to flooding.

Feni also suffered significant flooding during Cyclone Komen in 2015 and Cyclone Roanu in 2016. These events brought heavy rainfall and tidal surges causing widespread inundation in the southeastern region, including Feni, causing extensive crop and infrastructure damage.

==== Flora ====
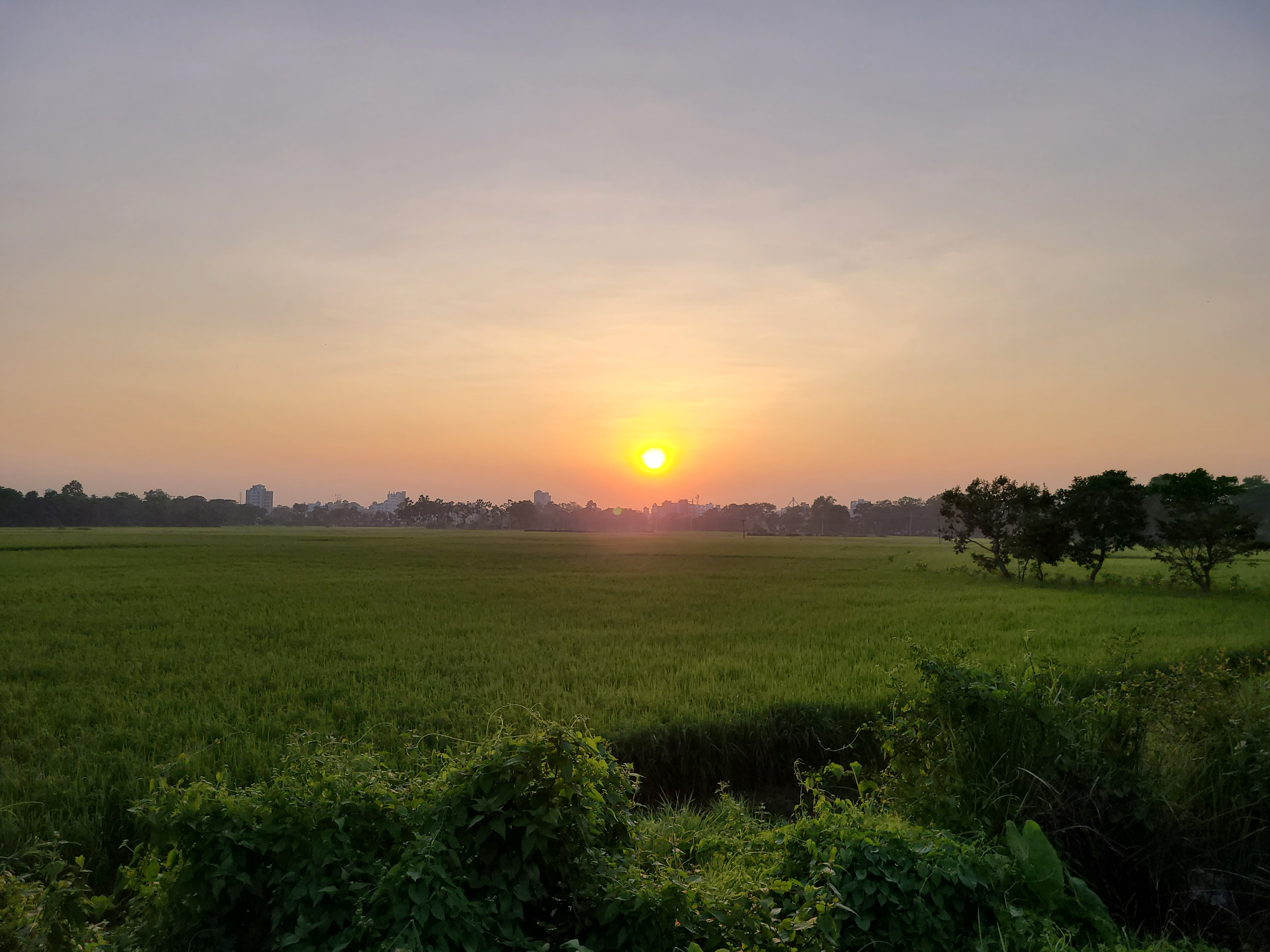
Rice cultivation in Feni

In the farmlands of Feni District, a diverse range of crops are cultivated, including local and high-yield variety (HYV) rice, jute, vegetables, spices, pulses, oilseeds, etc. are produced. Although the total forest area in the district, covering 2,179.22 hectares (21.7922 km^{2}) is not organised, the plain land is often covered under homestead forests (Note: In rural Bangladesh, homestead forestry, often referred to as "home gardens," is an integrated farming system where various crops, including trees, are cultivated alongside livestock, poultry, and/or fish production. These gardens primarily serve to fulfill the basic needs of the farmers.) containing diverse fruit and non-fruit trees.

Common trees in the area include P. amygdalus (badaam), D. blancoi (gaab/velvet apple), E. jambolana (jaam), B. flabellifer (palm), T. indica (tamarind or tetul), A. heterophyllus (jackfruit), A. marmelos (wood apple or bael), D. indica (chalta), Z. mauritiana (boroi), and P. guajava (guava). Additionally, bananas, L. chinensis (lychee), A. carambola (kaamranga), A. squamosa (custard apple), T. chebula (haritaki), and P. emblica (amloki) grow abundantly in the area.

The district is home to indigenous timber trees like A. procera (karoi) and Dipterocarpus (garjan), alongside introduced species such as S. macrophylla (mahogany). Common trees like E. indica (mandar) are used for fuel and fencing, while B. ceiba (shimul) and N. cadamba (kadam) find use in matchstick and mattress production, respectively. New introductions include E. globulus (eucalyptus) and Pinus (pine). M. indica (mango wood) is abundant but low quality, while T. indica (tamarind) and Z. mauritiana (kul) wood is of good quality. C. fistula (amaltas) is used for furniture, and L. speciosa (jarul) for boat building and house pillars.

A. catechu (betel nut) plantations are increasing in the north and west of the district, while C. nucifera (coconut) trees are abundant district-wide. B. flabelliformis (taal) and P. dactylifera (date palms or khejur) are also common, with the latter being particularly valuable for its juice, which is used to make jaggery, and its leaves, which are used for large fans. Betel nut and coconut are significant sources of household income.

Shady trees in the area include F. indica (banyan), F. religiosa (peepal), and A. indica (neem). Although plantations of cane, bamboo, and thatching grass are gradually decreasing, they are still widely used for various purposes such as fencing, basket making, and thatching. Cane is utilised for making baskets, binding, and thatching. Marshes contain A. aspera (sola) and S. dichotomus (sitalpati), extensively used for making mats and baskets.

==== Fauna ====
Feni district boasts a diverse range of wildlife, including mammals, birds, fish, reptiles, amphibians, spiders, millipedes, and numerous insects. Common mammals in Feni include domestic species like B. taurus (domestic cow), C. hircus (goat), E. caballus (horse), S. murinus (chika), F. pennantii (dura kathbirali), H. auropunctatus (benji), several species of rats, and C. aureus (fox). Feni is home to a wide variety of bird species commonly found throughout Bangladesh.

The district boasts numerous species of freshwater fish, including L. rohita (ruhi), C. mrigala (mrigel), Catla, Macrones (tengra), C. magur (catfish), H. fossilis (singi), A. testudineus (koi), and marine fish, like C. striatus (shoal), W. attu (boal), C. marulius (gazar), Ompok (pabda), prawns, dry fish, and crabs. Small fishes include P. titteya (punti), M. armatus (baain), C. cachius (chela). Exotic fishes that are commonly used in commercial fish farming include C. idellus (grass carp), H. molitrix (silver carp), T. mossambica (tilapia), and O. niloticus (nilotica).

Several types of reptiles and amphibians are found in the district, including snakes, lizards, T. hurum (tortoises), different species of iguana, N. naja (cobra), B. melanostictus (toad), R. maculatus (tree frogs).

== Administration ==
Feni District upazila geocode map

=== Administrative divisions ===
The administrative structure of Feni District is organized into several tiers, with the Zila Parishad (district council) at the top level. The district is further divided into several upazilas, each serving as a rural administrative unit governed by the Upazila Parishad (sub-district council). Within each upazila, unions form the lowest rural administrative units, comprising mauzas and villages, and are overseen by the Union Parishad (union council). At the urban level, cities are designated as paurashavas or municipalities. These administrative bodies, both rural and urban, are responsible for a wide range of functions and duties concerning civic affairs, community welfare, and local development initiatives within the district.

Feni District comprises six upazilas (sub-districts), five municipalities, 43 union councils, 543 mauzas, and 577 villages. Among the six upazilas, Feni Sadar Upazila has the highest population, while Parshuram Upazila has the lowest. In terms of total area, Sonagazi Upazila is the largest, while Parshuram Upazila covers the smallest area.

Name of upazila	Area (in sq. k.m.)	Municipality	No. of union councils	Population (2022)
Feni Sadar Upazila	226.19	Feni	12	634,321
Daganbhuiyan Upazila	141.70	Daganbhuiyan	8	276,915
Chhagalnaiya Upazila	139.59	Chhagalnaiya	5	208,232
Sonagazi Upazila	284.89	Sonagazi	9	290,667
Parshuram Upazila	95.76	Parshuram	3	113,317
Fulgazi Upazila	102.19	-	6	125,444

==== District administration ====
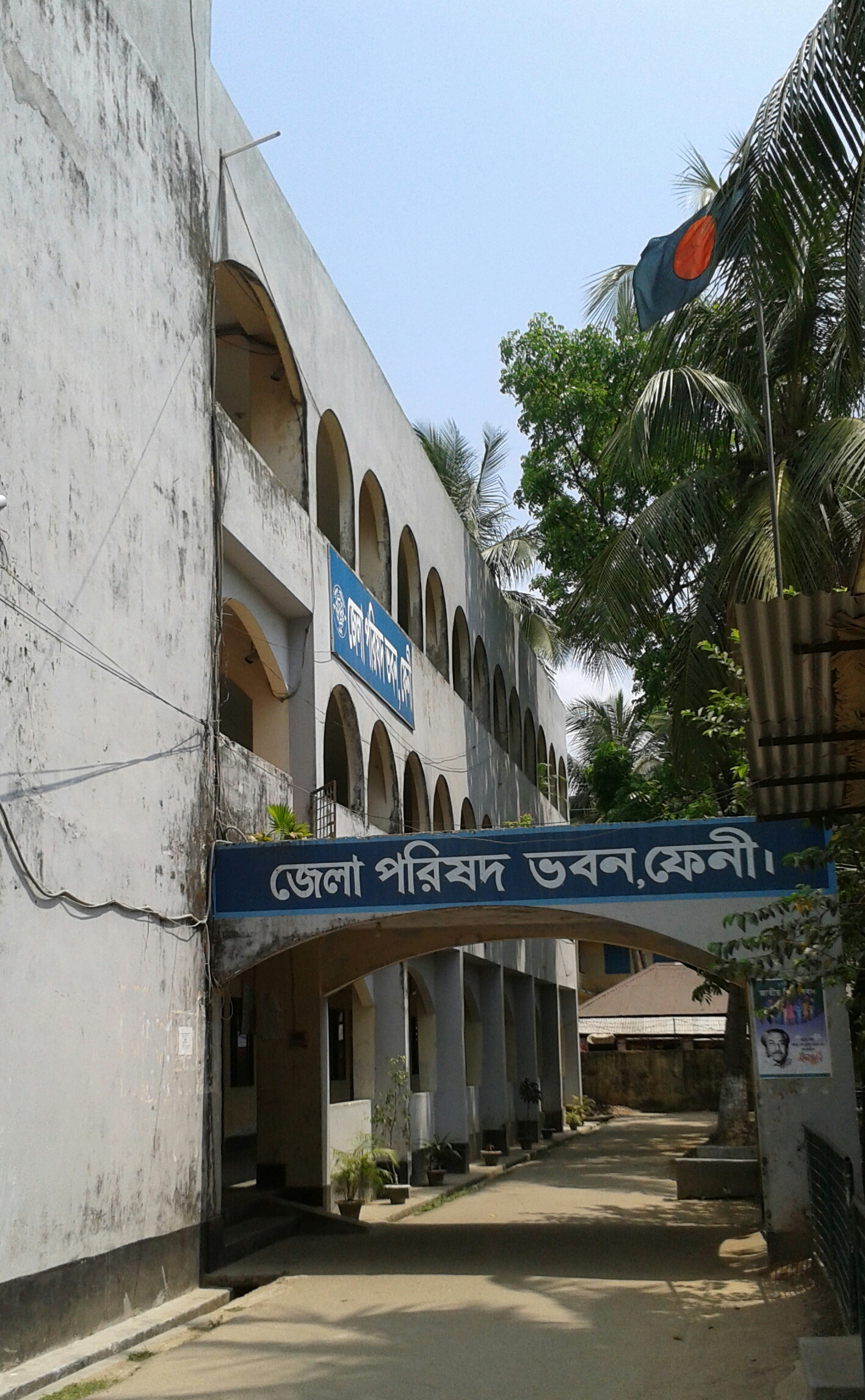
District council headquarters

At the district level, Feni District is governed by an appointed executive authority known as the Deputy Commissioner, who serves as the chief administrative and revenue officer. The Deputy Commissioner's responsibilities encompass overseeing all activities within the district. The governance of the district is overseen by the Zila Parishad, or District Council, which comprises elected members, officials, and women representatives. The council, which includes a chairman and vice-chairman elected from among its members, also features ex officio official members such as the Deputy Commissioner and the chief executive officer. Empowered by the Local Government Act of 1988 and Zila Parishad Act of 2000, the Zila Parishad is entitled to government grants and possesses the authority to levy taxes, rates, tolls, and fees on specified items. It also bears the responsibility of carrying out development activities by formulating annual and five-year plans in consultation with other local government institutions and individuals, considering their own financial capabilities. The district headquarters are located in the city of Feni.

Since November 2024, Saiful Islam has been serving as the appointed Deputy Commissioner of Feni District, superseding Mushammat Shahina Akhtar following protests demanding her removal. Khairul Bashar Majumdar Tapon was elected as the Chairman of the Zila Parishad in 2020, while Nahida Akter Tania assumed the position of Chief Executive Officer in 2024.

=== Constituencies of the national parliament ===
Feni District is represented by three constituencies in the Jatiya Sangsad. Feni-1 constituency covers Parshuram, Chhagalnaiya, and Fulgazi upazilas, while Feni-2 encompasses Feni Sadar Upazila and Feni-3 includes Sonagazi and Daganbhuiyan upazilas.

The constituent positions have been vacant since the dissolution of the national parliament on 6 August 2024.

== Demographics ==
Historical population
Year	Pop.	±% p.a.
1901	318,837	—
1911	340,563	+0.66%
1921	377,065	+1.02%
1931	431,450	+1.36%
1941	502,674	+1.54%
1951	540,257	+0.72%
1961	590,341	+0.89%
1974	760,015	+1.96%
1981	898,851	+2.43%
1991	1,096,745	+2.01%
2001	1,240,384	+1.24%
2011	1,437,371	+1.48%
2022	1,648,896	+1.26%
Sources: Notes: Census data 1981 & earlier includes Feni sub-division of Noakhali District

At the 2022 Census of Bangladesh, Feni District had a population of 1,648,896, ranking it as the 42nd most populous district out of the 64 districts in Bangladesh. Approximately 29.67% of its population resided in urban areas. The average annual population growth rate stood at 1.22%, equal to the national average. Children under 10 years old accounted for 20.09% (331,332) of the population. The district had a population density of 1,665 people per square kilometre. Feni Sadar had the highest population density, followed by Daganbhuiyan.

The census data stated that the district comprised 377,164 households, with an average household size of 4.3 people, higher than the national norm.

The sex ratio in Feni District was 89.87 males per 100 females, lower than the national average of 98.07.

The literacy rate among individuals aged 7 and over was 80.79%, surpassing the national average of 74.8%. However, males had a higher literacy rate than females.

=== Religion ===
Religions in Feni District (2022)
Religion	Percent
Muslims	94.41%
Hindus	5.53%
Other or not stated	0.06%

Religion in present-day Feni District
	1941 (Note: Including the former Feni subdivision of Noakhali district)		1981		1991		2001		2011		2022	
Religion	Pop.	%	Pop.	%	Pop.	%	Pop.	%	Pop.	%	Pop.	%
Islam	384,593	76.51%	827,486	92.06%	1,017,741	92.80%	1,159,374	93.47%	1,352,866	94.12%	1,556,695	94.41%
Hinduism	117,958	23.47%	70,891	7.89%	78,373	7.15%	80,543	6.49%	83,773	5.83%	91,160	5.53%
Others (Note: Including Christianity, Buddhism, or not stated)	123	0.02%	474	0.05%	631	0.05%	467	0.04%	732	0.05%	1,041	0.06%
Total Population	502,674	100%	898,851	100%	1,096,745	100%	1,240,384	100%	1,437,371	100%	1,648,896	100%

The majority of the population in this district adheres to Islam, with a minority Hindu population. Muslims constitute 94.41% of the population, while Hindus make up around 5.53%. There is a small population of around 700 Buddhists living in Feni Sadar and Sonagazi upazilas.

=== Language ===
The regional language of Feni exhibits notable similarities with the regional languages spoken in Chauddagram and Laksam upazilas of the Comilla region, as well as in Mirsharai and Baraiyarhat regions of Chittagong District. Additionally, the language spoken in the Noakhali and Lakshmipur areas shares many commonalities with the regional language of Feni. One distinctive feature of the Feni dialect is its accessibility to people from various regions of Bangladesh, who can readily understand and adopt its linguistic nuances.

== Economy ==
The economy of Feni includes rice farming, freshwater aquaculture, and the district receives substantial remittances from workers abroad. The district was hit by a major flood in August 2024 that the World Bank estimated caused US$312.7 million in direct damage there, and by a second, smaller flood in July 2025.

=== Migration and remittances ===
Overseas employment is a major source of income. In December 2023, it was reported that 317,120 people from Feni had gone abroad for work since 2005 and that Feni's expatriates sent US$555,100,000 (equivalent to $586,565,367 in 2025) in FY2022–23, ninth among districts. Feni received about US$370,000,000 (equivalent to $390,973,132 in 2025) in July 2023–February 2024, placing it seventh behind Dhaka, Chattogram, Sylhet, Cumilla, Noakhali and Brahmanbaria.

The 2022 population census recorded that 33.85% of Feni households received foreign remittances, the highest share of any district. A Bengali-language newspaper report on the 2022 poverty map said about 10% of Feni's people live abroad.

=== Poverty ===
The Poverty Map of Bangladesh 2022, produced by the Bangladesh Bureau of Statistics with the World Bank and World Food Programme, put Feni's poverty rate (upper poverty line) at 10.5%. The Business Standard listed Feni among the ten districts with the lowest rates, alongside Noakhali (6.1%), Khulna (10.2%) and Sirajganj (10.9%).

=== Agriculture ===
Feni is predominantly a rice-growing district. The 2019 Agriculture Census recorded about 101,063 acres (408.99 km^{2}) acres of net cultivated land. It lists Aman as the district's largest rice crop, followed by Boro and Aus.

=== Fisheries ===
The Muhuri project area, which spans Feni and Mirsharai Upazila in Chattogram, is a major freshwater aquaculture cluster. A 2026 report on the fish-distribution firm Mokam Fish described it as having an estimated annual capacity of up to 100,000 tonnes, about 5,000 farmers and nearly 20,000 acres of water bodies, and as supplying about 70% of Chattogram's freshwater fish demand; these figures are the company's. The Department of Fisheries yearbook for 2023–24 records pond fish production in Feni of 30,345 tonnes from about 5,900 hectares, a yield of 5.14 tonnes per hectare, and total inland production of 39,917 tonnes; ponds therefore account for about 76% of the total.

=== Energy ===
The Electricity Generation Company of Bangladesh (EGCB) operates the 75 MW Sonagazi solar power plant at Purba Bardhali, Char Chandia, Sonagazi. The plant was financed by the International Development Association (World Bank) and the government, built by the Trina Solar–HYDC joint venture, and lists a commercial operation date of 1 April 2024. The project was originally planned at 50 MW; EGCB put its total cost at ৳8.75 billion (equivalent to ৳9.7 billion or US$79 million in 2024), of which the World Bank loan was ৳7.25 billion (equivalent to ৳8.0 billion or US$65 million in 2024).

On 1 December 2025 the Executive Committee of the National Economic Council approved a 220 MW plant at Sonagazi costing ৳1888.10 crore (US$150 million) on 634 acres (2.57 km^{2}) of EGCB land. The Islamic Development Bank is to provide US$143.28 million in loan financing, and the plant is expected to use the transmission facilities built for the 75 MW plant.

=== Industry, trade and special economic zone ===
Part of the National Special Economic Zone (formerly Bangabandhu Sheikh Mujib Shilpa Nagar) lies in Sonagazi Upazila. The zone spans about 30,000 acres (120 km^{2}) across Mirsharai and Sitakunda in Chattogram District and Sonagazi in Feni.

The Belonia land port at Parshuram, on the border with Tripura, India, was upgraded from a land customs station on 4 October 2009; a 2017 report said exports to India were worth Tk 44.73 crore in FY2015–16 and that no Indian goods were being imported through it. The Bangladesh Land Port Authority built the port at a cost of ৳38.64 crore (US$3.1 million), inaugurated in 2023

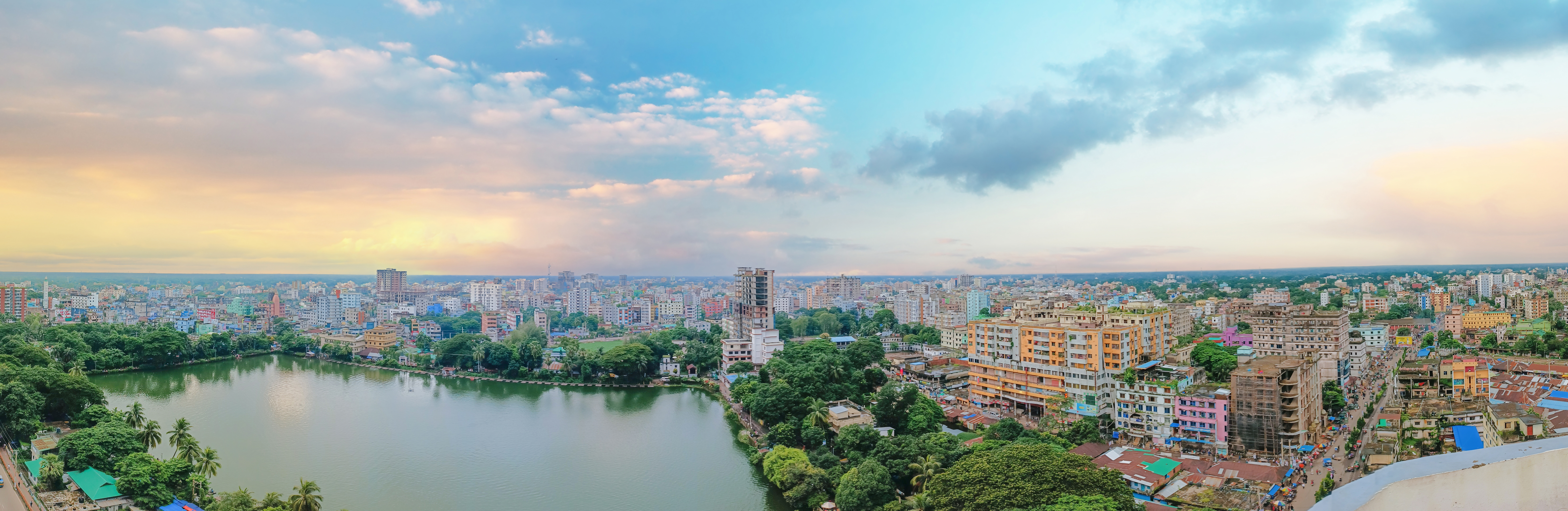
High-resolution panorama of Feni city, taken from Feni garden city, on August 2025.

== Education ==
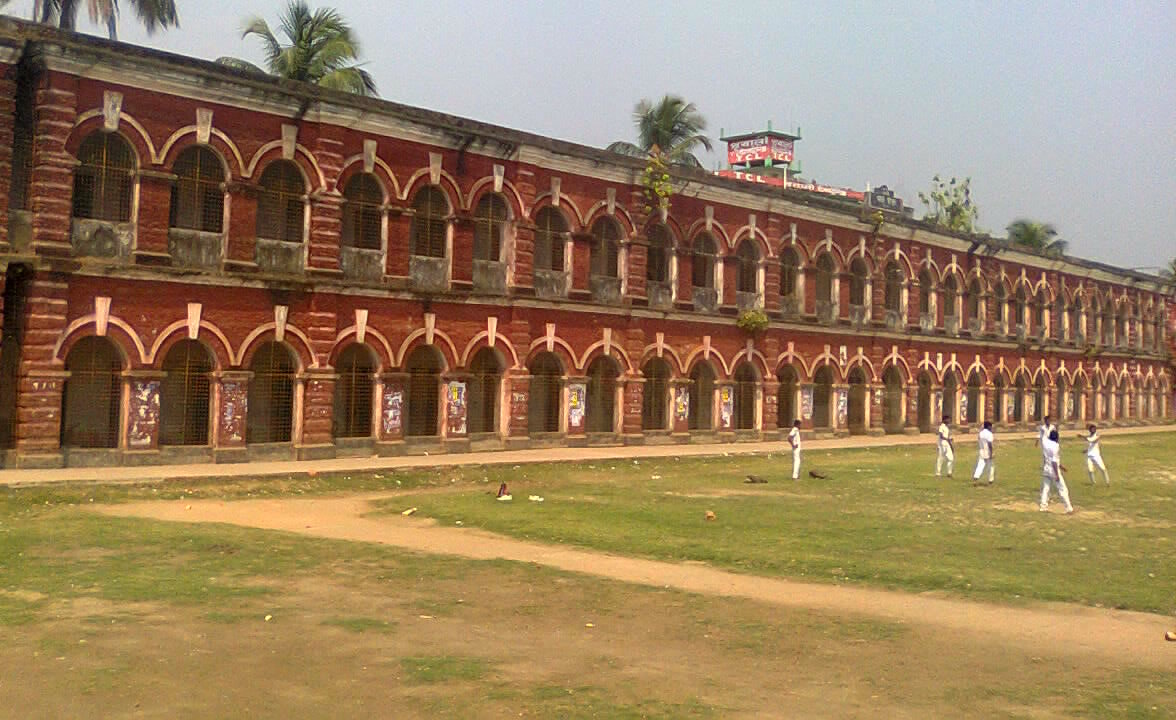
Feni Gov't Pilot High School

As of 2011, Feni District had 11 degree colleges, 10 higher secondary colleges, one girls' cadet college, one polytechnic institute (Feni Polytechnic Institute), one computer institute (Feni Computer Institute), 155 secondary schools, 19 lower secondary schools, 528 primary schools, 99 madrasas, six technical and vocational institutions. In 2012, a university was established to address the higher educational requirements of students in the region.

=== Schools ===
The year 1886 marked a significant milestone in the establishment of modern educational institutions in Feni. Nabinchandra Sen, serving as the Sub-divisional Officer of Feni at the time, founded the inaugural primary school of the sub-division, known today as Feni Pilot School, through community fundraising efforts. Feni's first English high school was established shortly thereafter. Later, in 1910, the first girls' school in Feni was inaugurated. Outside the city of Feni, the oldest noteworthy high schools are Mangalkandi, Chhagalnaiya Pilot, and Amirabad, established before 1920. Additionally, Atatürk Model High School in Daganbhuiyan Upazila was established in 1939.

=== Colleges and universities ===
Founded in 1922, Feni College stands as a traditional institution dedicated to the advancement of higher education. Before its inception, students from affluent backgrounds typically had to travel to Dhaka or Kolkata for further studies. However, the establishment of Feni College provided a local avenue for higher education, enabling students from diverse economic backgrounds to pursue advanced studies. This accessibility contributed to the rapid expansion of the college, marking a significant milestone in the educational landscape of the area. Besides the historical Feni College, colleges that are also available for higher education in Feni include Govt Zia Women's College (established as Feni Women's College), Chhagalnaiya College, Parshuram College, Fulgazi College, Haji Monir Ahmed College, Sonagazi College, Daganbhuiyan Iqbal Memorial College, Sheikh Shahidul Islam College. In 2006, Prime Minister Khaleda Zia inaugurated Feni Girls' Cadet College, one of the three cadet colleges for girls in Bangladesh. The privately owned Feni University, established in 2012 and beginning its academic activities in 2013, is the only university in the district.

== Health ==
There are one modern government general hospital, 5 upazila health complexes, one heart foundation hospital, one diabetic hospital, one chest disease clinic (tuberculosis), one trauma center, one mother and child care center, one nursing training institute, 19 union health centers, 33 union family care centers and 114 community clinics.

There was a private medical college named Feni Medical College from 1997 to 2004.

== Transport ==
=== Road ===
The district is situated adjacent to the Dhaka–Chittagong Highway, facilitating convenient access from any district of Bangladesh via Chittagong and Dhaka. The Feni–Noakhali Highway serves as a vital link between Feni and Noakhali districts, with a total length of 49.56 kilometres (30.80 mi).

The district boasts a total length of 1,044.85 kilometres (649.24 mi) of paved roads, complemented by 87.96 kilometres (54.66 mi) of semi-paved roads and 2,132.96 kilometres (1,325.36 mi) of dirt roads.

Private bus operators offer a variety of services in Feni District. Star Line Special, providing both AC and non-AC buses, connects Dhaka with Feni, Chhagalnaiya, Parshuram, and Sonagazi. Additionally, S. Alam, Soudia, Keya Paribahan, and Shyamoli are prominent operators serving the area. Star Line Special extends its services from Chittagong to Feni and Parshuram as well. Feni District enjoys bus connections to over 30 districts across Bangladesh and provides access to Kolkata via Benapole.

=== Rail ===
Feni District is well-connected by rail, with trains serving destinations such as Chittagong, Chandpur, and Sylhet, besides Dhaka, all from the main Feni railway station. Among the trains operating in the region are:

Mahanagar, Paharika, Meghna, Udayan, Turna, Chattogram Mail, Karnaphuli, Jalalabad, Sagarika, and Mymensingh Express.

A branch line connecting the Tripura border town of Belonia with Feni city has been defunct since 17 August 1997, due to financial losses from improved road connectivity. Constructed in 1929 by the Assam Bengal Railway company, the 27 km (17 mi) line includes nine stations: Bondhua, Daulatpur, Anandapur, Pirbox, Munshir Haat, Notun Munshir Haat, Fulgazi, Parshuram, and Belonia. In 2019, an agreement between Bangladesh and India was signed to revive the line primarily for freight traffic, allowing India access to Chittagong port via Feni.

Other railway stations on the main line in Feni Sadar include Fazilpur, Kalidah, and Sharishadi, while Muhuriganj railway station is located in Chhagalnaiya. All of these stations, except Fazilpur, are closed as of 2015.

=== Air ===
In 2023, Bird's Eye Feni Helicopter and Air Service initiated a charter helicopter service, providing private helicopter rides throughout the country, including destinations like Dhaka, Chittagong, and Cox's Bazar. The service is designed to cater to diverse needs such as emergency patient transport, corporate travel, and media coverage.

== Notable people ==
- Khaleda Zia, Ex. Prime Minister of Bangladesh
- Shamsher Gazi, resistance fighter during British rule in the subcontinent.
- Hamidul Huq Chowdhury, Former Minister of Foreign Affairs of Pakistan.
- Saber H Chowdhury, Former Minister of Environment, Forest and Climate Change of Bangladesh & Former President of Bangladesh Cricket Board
- Shahiduddin Ahmed Selim, Bangladeshi footballer and coach, captained the Bangladesh national football team at the 1980 AFC Asian Cup.
- Abul Kalam Azad Chowdhury, former vice chancellor of the University of Dhaka
- Zahur Hossain Chowdhury, Bangladeshi journalist & Politician
- Anwarullah Chowdhury, vice-chancellor of the University of Dhaka
- Aurangzeb Chowdhury, Chief of Navy
- Habibullah Bahar Chowdhury, first health minister of East Pakistan, one of the founders of Mohammedan Sporting Club (Kolkata).
- Nabi Chowdhury, Bangladeshi footballer, first East Pakistani or Bengali player to captain the Pakistan national football team.
- Selim Al Deen, playwright and theater artist
- Zafar Imam, politician
- Kamal Ahmed Majumdar, politician
- Shahidullah Kaiser, novelist and journalist
- Shamsunnahar Mahmud, politician and educator
- Selina Parvin, writer and journalist
- Zahir Raihan, film director and writer
- Giasuddin Selim, film director
- Mohammad Saifuddin, cricketer
- Abdus Salam, Bengali language movement protester
- Abdus Salam, former editor of the Pakistan Observer (later the Bangladesh Observer). Ekushey Padak winning journalist
- Shihab Shaheen, film actor and director
- Iqbal Sobhan, journalist
- Mohiuddin Ahmed, editor and publisher, and the founder of The University Press Limited
- Joynal Hazari, politician
- Abdul Awal, politician
- Khawaja Ahmed, member of the 1st Bangladeshi parliament
- Bimal Kar, Bangladeshi footballer and referee, represented the Shadhin Bangla football team
- Fahamedul Islam, footballer for Bangladesh national football team.

== See also ==
- Khondoler misti
