= Parshuram, Bangladesh =

Town and municipality in Chittagong Division, Bangladesh

Parshuram পরশুরাম
- Town and municipality
- location of Parshuram town in Bangladesh
- Coordinates: 23.213518°N 91.444693°E
- Country: Bangladesh
- Division: Chittagong Division
- District: Feni District
- Upazila: Parshuram Upazila
- Municipality: 22 April 2001

Government
  - Type: Municipality
  - Body: Parshuram Municipality
  - Paura Mayor: Nizam Uddin Ahommod Chowdhury

Area
  - Total: 22.4 km^{2} (8.6 sq mi)

Population (2011)
  - Total: 29,691
  - Density: 1,330/km^{2} (3,430/sq mi)
- Time zone: UTC+6 (BST)
- postal code: 3940
- National calling code: +880

Parshuram (Bengali: পরশুরাম) is a town and municipality in Feni district in the division of Chittagong, Bangladesh. It is the administrative headquarter and urban centre of Parshuram Upazila.

In January 2021, Nizam Uddin Ahmed Chowdhury was elected mayor of Parshuram unopposed.
