= Khondoler misti =

Bangladeshi sweet

- Alternative names: Khondoler roshogolla
- Type: Snacks
- Course: Dessert
- Place of origin: Khondol, Parshuram, Feni, Bangladesh
- Region or state: Feni District
- Associated cuisine: Bangladesh
- Created by: Jogol Chandra Das
- Serving temperature: hot, cold
- Main ingredients: Chhana, sugar syrup
- Variations: Roshogolla

Khondoler misti (Bengali: খন্ডলের মিষ্টি) is a sweet originating in the Khandal of Feni district, Bangladesh. This sweet is very common in the Feni area. It is a variation of roshogolla. The specialty of this sweet is that while all other sweets of Bangladesh are consumed at cold or normal temperature, Khondoler misti is consumed at hot or normal temperature.

== Ingredients ==
- Chhana
- Flour
- Oil, for frying
- Sugar syrup
