= Bimal Kar (footballer) =

Bangladeshi footballer (1937–2024)

- Bimal after retirement

Personal information
- Date of birth: 9 June 1937
- Place of birth: Feni, Bengal Province, British India
- Date of death: 19 September 2024 (aged 87)
- Place of death: Dhaka, Bangladesh
- Position: Centre-back

Senior career*
Years	Team	Apps	(Gls)
1959–?	P.E. Railway		
1966	Victoria SC		
1973–1974	Chittagong Mohammedan		
1975–1976	Young Star Club		

International career
1971	Shadhin Bangla		
- * Club domestic league appearances and goals

Bimal Kar (Bengali: বিমল কর, romanized: Bimol Kor, pronounced [bimɔl kɔɾ]; 9 June 1937 – 19 September 2024) was a Bangladeshi footballer. A centre-back, he was a member of the Shadhin Bangla football team during the Bangladesh War of Independence.

== Early life ==
Bimal Kar was born on 9 June 1937, in Parshuram Upazila of Feni District in Bengal, British India. He was the second child of Rohini Kar and Hiranmayi Kar. Bimal attended Feni High School, where he represented the school football team alongside Feni Evergreen Club in numerous football tournaments. Eventually, while studying at Comilla Victoria College, he participated in tournaments in Chittagong.

== Club career ==
In 1959, Bimal became a railway worker at Chittagong Railway and began representing the Railway football team in the Chittagong and Dhaka Football League. He also represented Chittagong Customs and Chittagong Power Board in the Chittagong First Division. In 1966, he joined Victoria SC in the Dhaka First Division League.

Bimal captained Chittagong Mohammedan in both 1973 and 1974, during which the club became consecutive Chittagong First Division champions. He retired in 1976, after playing for Chittagong's Young Star Club.

== International career ==
During the 1971 war, Bimal took shelter in Agartala, India, where he began playing in the Agartala Football League with Friends Club. Eventually, he was recruited by the Shadhin Bangla football team and came on as a substitute for Sheikh Monsur Ali during the team's inaugural match against Nadia XI on 25 July 1971. He became a regular starter for the team, which played a total of 16 friendly matches across India to raise economic support for the war.

On 13 February 1972, Bimal took part in the first football match in newly independent Bangladesh, representing Bangladesh XI against President XI. His team, composed of players from the Shadhin Bangla football team, lost 2–0 in the game held at Dhaka Stadium.

== Post-playing career ==
Following his retirement as a player in 1976, Bimal served as a first-rate football referee under the Chittagong District Sports Association and Bangladesh Football Federation. He also played an active role in administering Chittagong Mohammedan.

== Personal life and death ==
Bimal was married, and had three daughters and a son. He died on 19 September 2024 while undergoing treatment for age-related complications at Dhaka Central Military Hospital. He was 87.

== Bibliography ==
- Mahmud, Dulal (2020). খেলার মাঠে মুক্তিযুদ্ধ [Liberation war in the playground] (in Bengali). Bishhoshahitto Bhobon. ISBN 978-984-8218-31-0.
- Mahmud, Noman (2018). ফুটবল পায়ে মুক্তির যুদ্ধ [Liberation war fought by football] (in Bengali). Agamee Prakashani. ISBN 978-984-8218-31-0.
