= Feni Government College Killing field =

Feni Government College Boddhobhumi Memorial
- ফেনী সরকারি কলেজ বধ্যভূমি স্মৃতিসৌধ (Bengali)
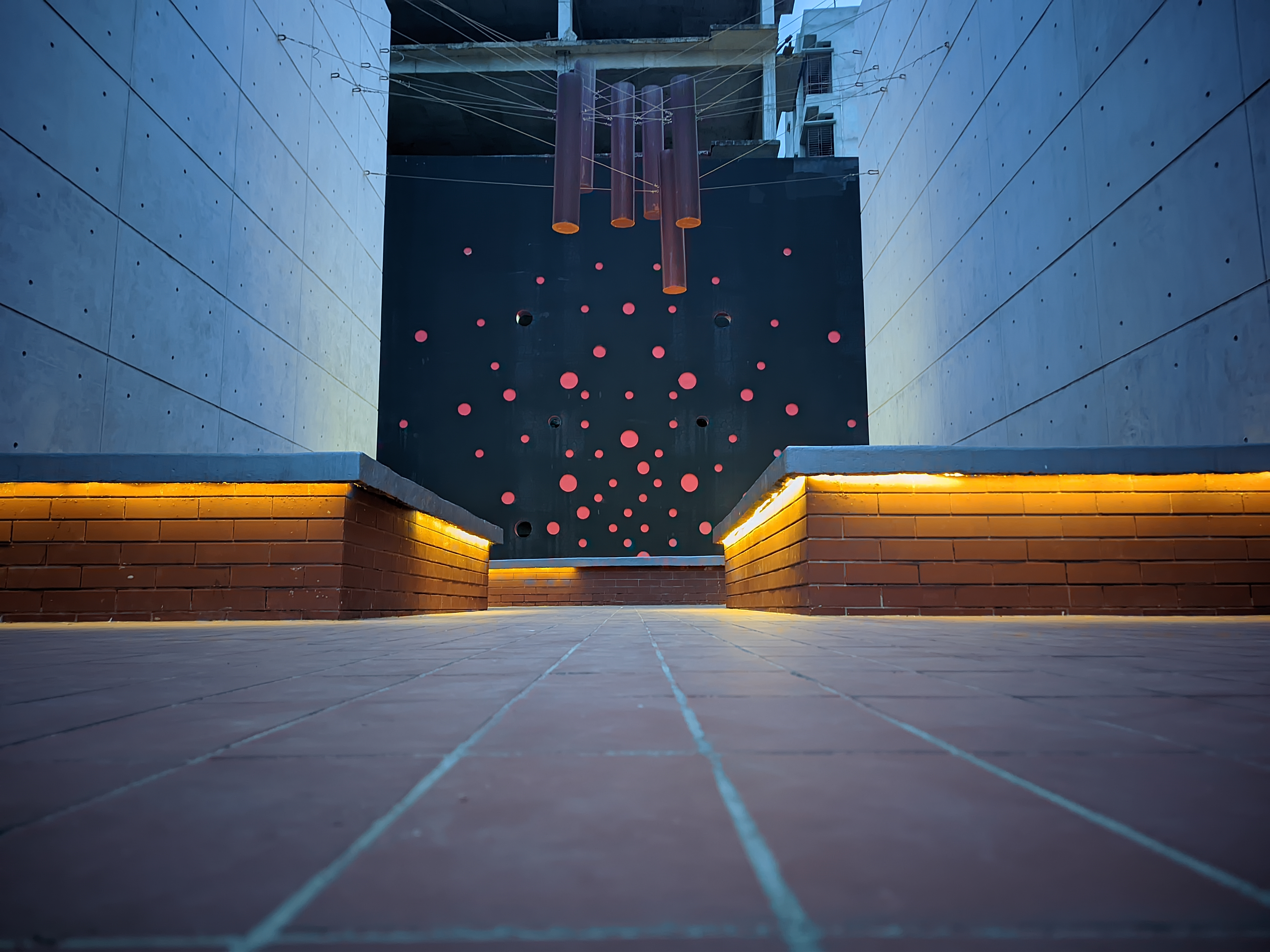

- Location in Bangladesh
- 23.011585°N 91.403852°E
- Location: Feni Government College, Feni

Site notes
- Area: approx. 1.5 acres
- Architect(s): Vector Plinth, Chattogram

Feni Government College Boddhobhumi (Bengali: ফেনী সরকারি কলেজ বধ্যভূমি) is a mass grave site situated on the premises of Feni Government College, which the Pakistan army, along with its local collaborators, used for torture and genocide during 1971 Bangladesh Liberation War.

== Background ==
During the Liberation War, Feni Government College was a centre for torture and killing by the Pakistani Army and local collaborators. Pro-liberation Bengalis were brought here, tortured, and killed. After being killed, the bodies were buried nearby.

After Feni was liberated on December 6, people searched for their relatives and found dead bodies at the burial site. Some of the bodies found were killed recently. The exact number of people killed remains unknown, but locals speculate that hundreds of Bengalis were killed here.

== Construction ==
In 2022, a plan to build a memorial at the site was initiated, and a committee was formed for this purpose. On August 30, the local member of Parliament Nizam Uddin Hazari, took the initiative, and a Chattogram-based architecture farm, Vector Plinth, was given the responsibility to design the memorial.

== Architecture ==
The memorial is located on a 1.5-acre plot at the southern part of the Feni Government College field. It features two tall walls on either side, shaped like a goalpost, serving as a 'silent fence.' During the war, people were hanged to death or tortured by hanging from the goalposts in the field. The wall in the background represents gunshot wounds. A total of six cylinders hanging over the memorial, supported by strings from the side walls, symbolize the spirit, vigilance, struggle, pain of the martyrs, and the victory and glory of independence. The red-colored stream flowing underneath represents the bloodshed in the Liberation War.
