= Muhuri Project =

Irrigation project and tourist spot in Bangladesh

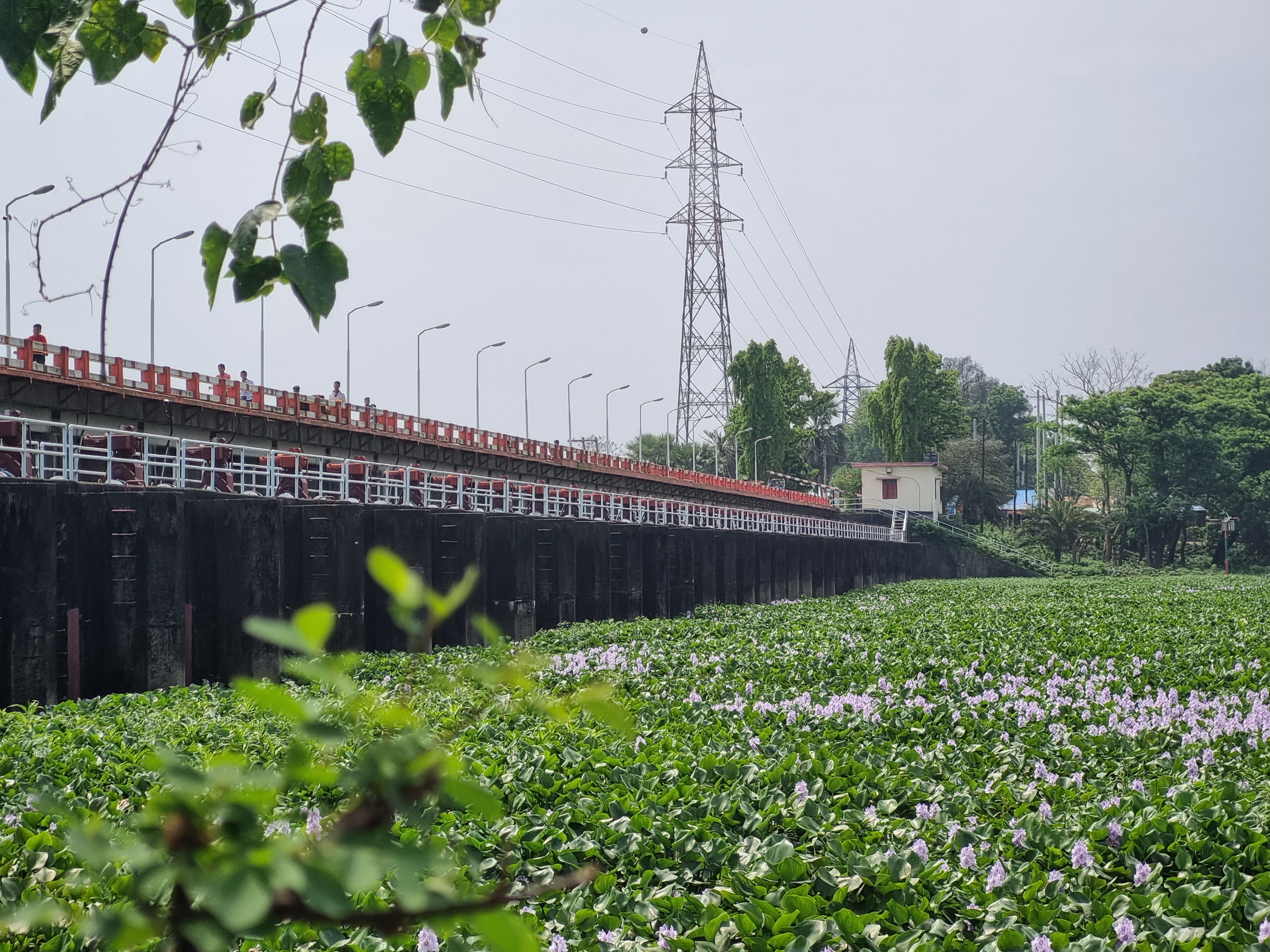
Water hyacinths on the Feni River at Muhuri Project

The Muhuri Irrigation Project (Bengali: মুহুরী সেচ প্রকল্প), commonly referred to as the Muhuri Project, is Bangladesh's second-largest irrigation project. It includes a closure dam and water control structure at the confluence of the Feni, Muhuri, and Kalidas-Pahaliya rivers. This project irrigates farmland and controls flooding in parts of Feni and Chittagong districts.

The project was completed during the fiscal year 1985–86. The surrounding area contains artificial water bodies, forestry, and fish farms, and receives visitors as a tourist site. The project area also includes the country's first wind power plant and its largest fisheries zone.

== Geographical location ==
=== Irrigation project ===
The irrigation project influences an area between coordinates 22.45°N 91.21°E and 23.09°N 91.35°E, encompassing the upazilas of Feni Sadar, Chhagalnaiya, Parshuram, Fulgazi, and Sonagazi of Feni District as well as parts of Mirsarai Upazila of Chittagong District in the south-eastern region of Bangladesh, adjacent to the coast of the Bay of Bengal.

=== Dam ===
The Muhuri Dam, officially called Feni River Closure Dam, is located at Sonagazi Upazila within Feni District, approximately 18 kilometres (11 mi) from Feni town. It sits at the border of Mirsarai Upazila in the Chittagong Division and seasonally holds the river water for irrigation purposes. During early winter, the dam is closed, forming a substantial lake. As the monsoon approaches, the sluice gate is opened to release water.

== Background ==
In the southeastern region of Bangladesh, the Feni River, the Muhuri River, and the Kalidas-Pahaliya River converge and flow into the Bay of Bengal. The area experienced saline intrusion, seasonal flooding, and freshwater loss during dry months. This project aimed to develop agricultural land covering approximately 27,000 hectares (270 km^{2}) in the tidal zone of the Feni (then part of Noakhali) and Chittagong districts.

Construction began in fiscal year 1977–78 and was completed in 1985–86. The project was built to reduce monsoon flooding and supply irrigation water for the aman crop across several upazilas (sub-districts) in Feni and Chittagong districts. The Feni River Closure Dam was built to store freshwater and block flooding and saltwater intrusion. Haskoning, a Royal Dutch Consulting Engineers firm, was tasked with designing and supervising the construction of the dam in January 1983, erecting a significant water control structure comprising 40 gates across the downstream confluence of the Feni River, Muhuri River, and Kalidas-Pahaliya River. Funding from CIDA, EEC, and the World Bank, along with support from the Japanese company Shimizu, facilitated the construction at a cost of ৳168 crore (US$14 million). Consequently, irrigation facilities were extended to 20,194 hectares (201.94 km^{2}) of land, with an additional 27,125 hectares (271.25 km^{2}) receiving supplementary irrigation provisions.

== Developments ==
=== Expansions ===
In 1996, plans for expanding the Muhuri Project were initiated, resulting in the development of the Muhuri-Kahua Irrigation Project. This new initiative partially overlaps with the existing Muhuri Irrigation Project.

In June 2014, the Executive Committee of the National Economic Council approved the Irrigation Management Improvement Project for Muhuri Irrigation Project with a budget of US$46 million. The project received funding from the Asian Development Bank, including an additional US$13.5 million concessionary loan, to repair and modernise the irrigation system. The project targets the repair of 17 kilometres (11 mi) of coastal embankments and the re-excavation of over 400 kilometres (250 mi) of canal drains by 2024. It also includes a prepaid metering system with electric pumps and underground pipelines to reduce water loss. This effort aims to mitigate flooding during monsoons and expand the dry-season irrigation area of the Muhuri irrigation system by 60 percent to 18,000 hectares (180 km^{2}). Following project implementation, it is anticipated that the average yield of irrigated boro paddy will increase to four tons per hectare of land, up from three tons in 2013. Furthermore, the project aims to ensure that at least 2 percent of pump operators, 5 percent of mobile water unit vendors, and 5 percent of project construction workers are women.

=== Wind power plant ===
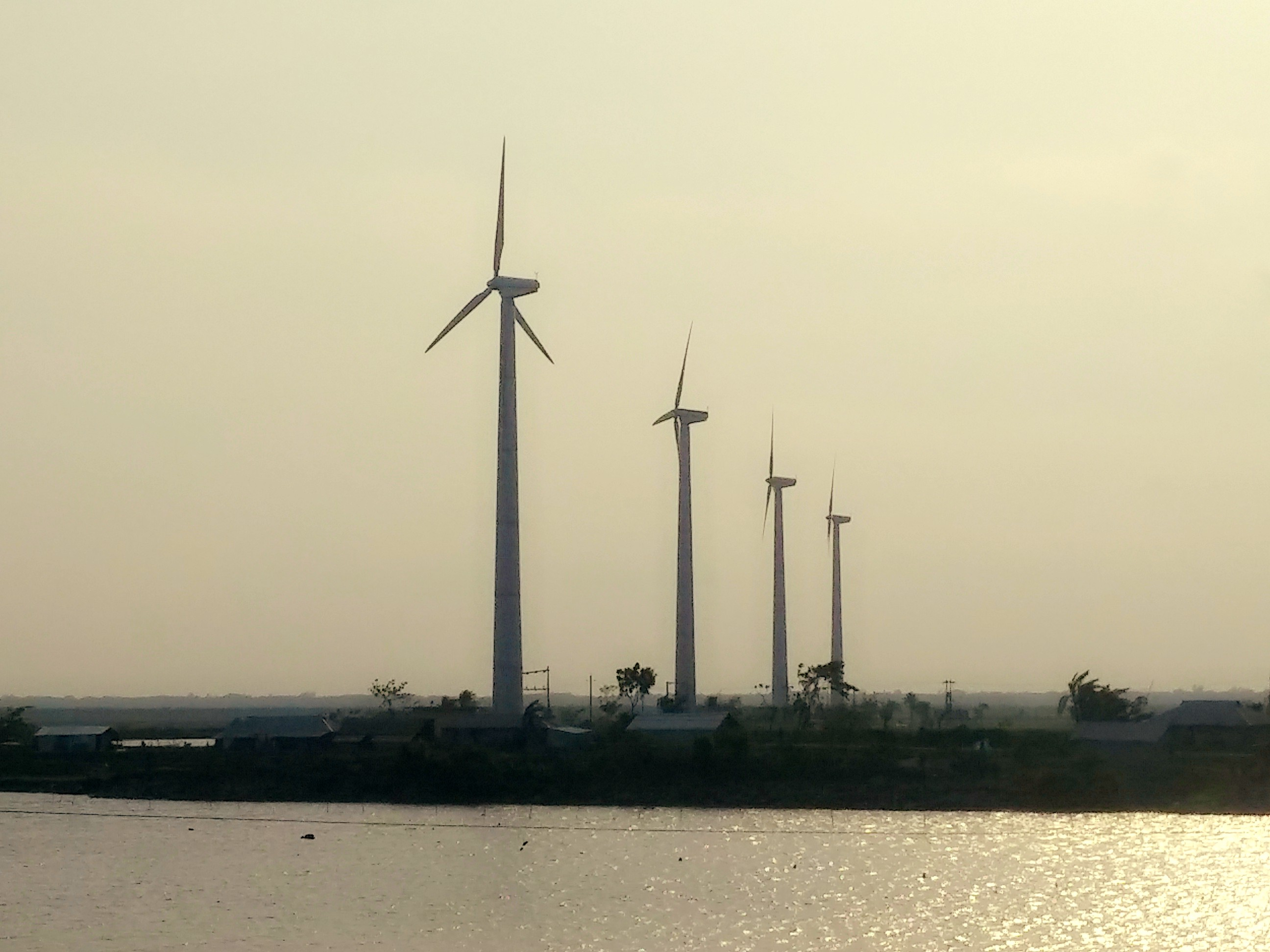
Wind-electricity turbines at Muhuri Project

The Bangladesh Power Development Board (BPDB) established the country's first wind power unit during the fiscal year 2004–05. This unit comprised four 225-kilowatt turbines with a total capacity of 900 kilowatts, at an estimated cost of ৳7.5 crore (US$610,000). Lamchi village in Sonagazi Union, within the Muhuri Project area, was chosen as the project site. The turbines, standing at a height of 50 meters, along with associated components, were procured from India and installed by India's Nebula Techno Solutions Company Limited. Electricity generation began in 2006, but the plant shut down after a few months. Power generation resumed for about six years, but as of 2022 the plant is non-operational, reportedly due to low wind speeds.

== Industries ==
=== Fish farming ===
The Muhuri Project area is the largest fisheries zone in Bangladesh. Local residents farm fish in enclosures along the embankments. Commercial fish projects operate on 7,000 acres of land across approximately 500 fisheries. These projects cultivate various fish species such as pangas, tilapia (including monosex tilapia), carp, pabda, gulsha, koi, shinghi, magur, and tengra. Fish from these projects are sold domestically and exported.

=== Tourism ===
The Muhuri Dam is a recreational and picnic site, particularly in winter. The artificial lake behind the dam is surrounded by an embankment and often covered with water hyacinths. Forest Department plantings near the dam include deer and monkey populations. The lower slopes of the embankment are adorned with stone lining, while the upper portions feature a carpet of grass. Boating on the Muhuri River allows observation of duck species and roughly a hundred bird species.
