= Feni University =

Private university in Feni, Bangladesh

Coordinates: 23.0221°N 91.3851°E

- Motto: শিক্ষা ও উন্নয়নের জন্য কেন্দ্রস্থল
- Motto in English: Center for Learning and Development
- Type: Private
- Established: 2012; 14 years ago
- Affiliations: University Grants Commission
- Chancellor: President Mohammed Shahabuddin
- President: Abdus Sattar
- Vice-Chancellor: M. Jamaluddin Ahmed, FRSC, FRS
- Location: Barahipur, Trunk Road, Feni, Feni District, Bangladesh
- Website: feniuniversity.ac.bd

Feni University (FU) is a private university established in 2012 under the 2010 Private University Act. The campus is in Feni, Bangladesh. It started academic activity in May 2013. The university was formally granted by UGC in November 2012.

== Campus ==
Feni University's temporary campus is at Barahipur in Feni Sadar Upazila. For the establishment of permanent campus, three acres of land has been purchased beside Dhaka-Chittagong Highway at Muhammad Ali Market in Feni.

== Administration ==
The current president of the board of trustees is Alauddin Ahmed Chowdhury Nasim, a former protocol officer and APS under the prime minister of Bangladesh Sheikh Hasina. Vice Chancellor is M. Jamaluddin Ahmed, FRSC, FRS, who previously served as professor and department head of chemistry, University of Chittagong. Treasurer is Taibul Hoque, who previously served as principal of Feni Govt. College.

== Faculties ==
Feni University currently has 3 Faculties.

=== Faculty of Business Administration ===
- Bachelor of Business Administration (BBA)
- Executive Master of Business Administration (EMBA)
- Master of Business Administration (MBA)
- Regular Master of Business Administration (RMBA)

=== Faculty of Science & Engineering ===
- B.Sc. in Civil Engineering (CE)
- B.Sc. in Computer Science and Engineering (CSE)
- B.Sc. in Electrical and Electronics Engineering (EEE)
- M.Sc. in Mathematics

=== Faculty of Arts, Social Sciences & Law ===
- Bachelor of Arts in English (BA)
- Bachelor of Law (LLB)
- Master of Arts in English (MAE, 1 year)
- Master of Arts in English (MAE, 2 year)
- PGD in Library and Information Sciences
