= Mahakuma =

A mahakuma is a mid-level administrative division used in parts of South Asia.

In 1950s Assam, a mahakuma was a sub-division. Currently, in Assamese and Bengali, "Tehsil"-level subdivisions of Assam and West Bengal are referred to as "mahamuka".

As of 1977, Bangladesh was divided into 19 zilas (districts). The districts were subdivided into 62 mahakumas (subdistricts). The Local Government Ordinance of 1982 abolished the mahakuma as an administrative tier. Then existing mahakumas were re-designated and upgraded as new districts.

== See also ==
- Administrative divisions of India
- Zila (country subdivision)
