= Muhammad Muqim =

18th-century Bengali poet

Syed Muhammad Muqim
- সৈয়দ মোহাম্মদ মুকিম
- Born: 18th-century Noapara, Chittagong, Mughal Empire
- Occupation: Poet
- Notable work: Faydul Muqtadi, Gul-e-Bakawali, Tajul-Bakāwali, Kalakam, Mrigābôti, Aiyub Nôbir Kôtha

Syed Muhammad Muqim (Bengali: সৈয়দ মোহাম্মদ মুকিম) was an 18th-century Bengali poet, author, and philosopher who was active during the advent of company rule in Bengal. His puthis are notable as they are interspersed with his own philosophical thoughts on prosody, music, astrology, and religions.

== Background ==
Muqim was born in the 18th century, to a Bengali Muslim family of Syeds in the neighbourhood of Noapara in Chittagong. His father, Syed Muhammad Daulat, had origins in Feni. Muqim later became a disciple of Sufi poet Ali Raza, and he was also inspired by the poetry of Muhammad Danesh. After losing his father at an early age, Muqim started his career at the record office of Ali Akbar Chowdhury, a prominent zamindar of Chittagong. Bichitra Sen of The Azadi asserts that there were two poets of Chittagong with the name Muhammad Muqim.

== Works ==
- Faydul Muqtadi (1773)
- Tajul-Bakāwali, his own Bengali rendition of the Persian romance Gul-e-Bakāwali (which also has references to colonial rule in Chittagong)
- Kalakam
- Mrigābôti, his own Bengali rendition of a romance about fairies
- Aiyub Nôbir Kôtha (About the prophet Job)
