= District councils of Bangladesh =

Local administrative division of Bangladesh

A district council or zila parishad, or zilla parishad is a local government body for districts in Bangladesh. The Bengali word parishad means council and zila parishad translates to district council.

== History ==
The 1988 Local Government (Zila Parishad) Act provided for zila parishads constituted with a mixture of representative members and appointed members. Half of the members of a zila parishad were elected (the members of parliament for the district and the chairman of union parishads and town committees in the district). The government appointed the remaining half.

== Constitution ==
The Constitution of Bangladesh states that local government bodies will consist of elected representatives however proper implementation is partial to this day.

== Administrative structure ==
The deputy commissioner (popularly abbreviated to "DC") of the district used to hold the position of the ex officio chairman of the district council previously, before the enactment of conducting elections to elect the chairman of the district council had been introduced and passed thereby. He is appointed by the government from a deputy secretary of BCS administration cadre. He is also called the district magistrate.

== Functions ==
The functions of the district council include construction and maintenance of roads, and bridges, building hospitals and dispensaries, schools and educational institutions, health facilities and sanitation, tube wells for drinking water, rest houses, and coordination of activities of the union parishads within the district.

== Sources of income ==
In addition to a grant from the government, district councils are empowered to have a fund based on taxes, rates, fees, tolls, cess, etc.
