= Feni Government College =

College in Bangladesh

- ফেনী সরকারি কলেজ
- Logo of Feni Govt. College
- Type: Government University College
- Established: 1922
- Affiliations: National University, Bangladesh
- Principal: Mohammad Enamul Hoque Khandakar
- Administrative staff: 64
- Students: 24,000
- Undergraduates: 15 Departments
- Postgraduates: 15 Departments
- Location: College Road, Feni, Feni District, 3900, Bangladesh; 23.0121°N 91.4020°E
- Campus: Rural
- Website: fgc.gov.bd

Feni Government College (Bengali: ফেনী সরকারি কলেজ, romanized: Feni Shorkari College), also referred to as FGC, is a traditional higher education institute of Feni District of Bangladesh. It is one of the oldest educational institutions in southeastern Bengal. It is located in the heart of Feni City.

== History ==
In 1918, various initiatives were taken to establish the college. In 1922, Khan Bahadur Bazlul Huq constituted a trustee board and since then the college was originally started. The member of this college birth of the first governing bodies were Khan Bahadur Abdul Aziz, Khan Saheb Maulabhi Bajlul Haque, Maulvi Abdul Khaliq, Maulvi Hasan Ali, Maulvi Abdus Sattar, Sarbaprayata Sriramani Mohan Goswami, Mahendra Kumar Ghosh, Kalicarana Nath, Shandip Roy, Sriguru Das Kor, Srikalijaya Chakraborty, Inayat Hazari, Birendra Bhattacharjee and Ambikacharan Rakkhit Roy Bahadu. The first chairman of this committee was Akramuzzaman Khan who was the sub-divisional officer of Feni and the first secretary of this committee was Maulvi Abdul Khaleq.

=== Finance and land acquisition ===
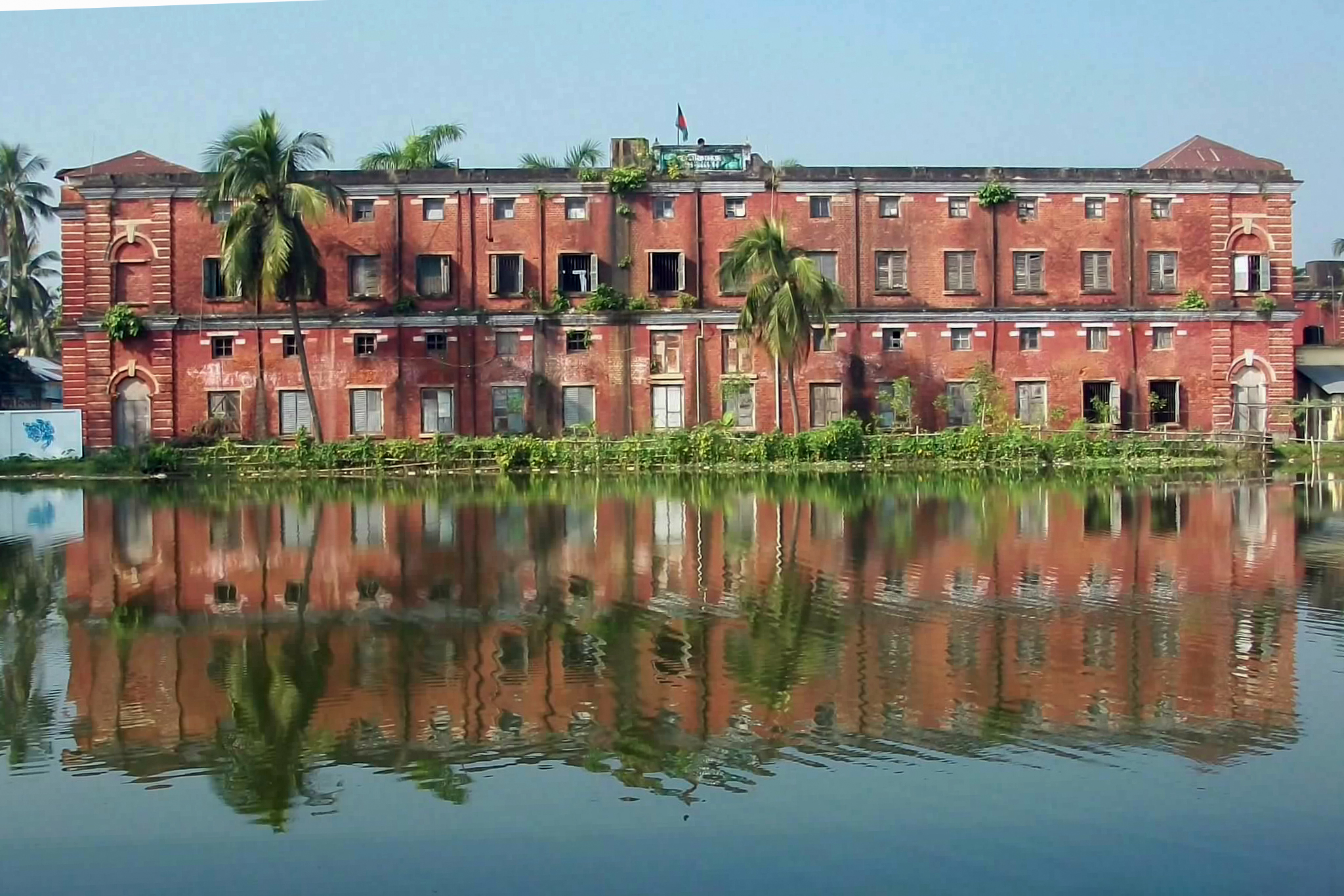
Administrative Building of Feni College

Feni College was established in the Feni region. At that time, 20,000 Tk was raised locally in the first phase. After the Noakhali district board to 50 Thousand Tk, Calcutta inmate Feni amiragamora overload Candricarana Saha gave the 4 thousand Tk, District overload Kumar Arun Chandra Singh Bahadur, gave two thousand Tk, Sattendra Chandra Ghosh 1 thousand Tk, Lakshmipur Sahesta the landlord Pyarilala Roy Chowdhury passed the five hundred Tk, Chandra Kumar Chowdhury, the zamindar family of Banspara family of Feni gave 1 thousand taka. Old Harjari house of Feni donated some land and money. The college's activities started at the annual gift of Feni High School (Tk. Later, some of the khas lands and private land surrounding the college were included in the donation and purchase sources. The current college size is 9.25 acres (6.5 acres in Feni mound, 3 acres in Faleshwar Mouza). The journey of this college started with a college building, a Hindu and a Muslim hostel on both sides of the pond. Since its inception, the college is free from all financial problems of student support and student wages. On 10 August 1926, the then British India, His Excellency the Governor, Sir Hugh, who stiphenasana Lansdowne CI, SI CS College, was inaugurated two-storey main building.

== Alumni ==
- Muhammad Shamsul Huq, Bangladeshi academic and former Minister of Foreign Affairs
- Selim Al Deen, playwright

== Academics ==
=== Departments and Programs ===
==== Higher Secondary Programs ====
Feni Government College offers Higher Secondary Certificate (HSC) programs in science, humanities, and commerce groups, affiliated with the Boards of Intermediate and Secondary Education. These two-year programs follow the national curriculum managed by the Directorate of Secondary and Higher Education.

==== Undergraduate Programs ====
Feni Government College, affiliated with the National University of Bangladesh, maintains 18 academic departments that deliver undergraduate programs focused on traditional disciplines in arts, social sciences, commerce, and sciences. These departments emphasize honors-level bachelor's degrees, with some offering master's programs, contributing to higher education in southeastern Bangladesh.

The undergraduate offerings include bachelor's pass courses and honors programs across the following 15 departments:

- Bangla
- English
- History
- Islamic History and Culture
- Philosophy
- Political Science
- Social Work
- Economics
- Accounting
- Management
- Physics
- Chemistry
- Botany
- Zoology
- Mathematics

Postgraduate programs were previously available in 12 departments affiliated with the National University, including Bengali, English, History, Islamic History and Culture, Philosophy, Islamic Studies, Political Science, Social Work, Economics, Accounting, Management, and Mathematics, building on the undergraduate curriculum to provide advanced specialization. The programs adhere to the National University's standardized syllabus, prioritizing foundational knowledge in humanities, social sciences, and natural sciences relevant to regional educational needs.

=== Enrollment and Admissions ===
Feni Government College enrolled approximately 22,000 students across its intermediate, honors, and master's programs as of 2017, making it one of the largest government colleges in Bangladesh. This figure encompasses a diverse student body primarily from Feni district and surrounding areas in southeastern Bengal, reflecting the region's demographic composition of predominantly Bengali Muslims with a mix of rural and urban backgrounds.

Admission procedures for higher secondary (HSC) programs follow the centralized system managed by the Directorate of Secondary and Higher Education, involving online applications and allocation based on SSC results through a lottery or merit process. For honors and master's programs, admissions are governed by the National University of Bangladesh guidelines, requiring online subject choice applications, followed by merit lists derived from SSC and HSC GPAs; entrance examinations are conducted for select departments to ensure competitive selection.

Since its establishment in 1922 with an initial enrollment of just 144 students, the college has experienced substantial growth, reaching over 20,000 students by the 2010s, driven by increased access to higher education in the region. This expansion highlights the institution's role in serving the educational needs of southeastern Bengal's growing population.

Student support includes government-provided stipends and financial aid programs for meritorious and economically disadvantaged students, a feature present since the college's early days to promote equity in access to education. These initiatives, aligned with national policies, help sustain enrollment from diverse socioeconomic groups in the area.
