= Parshuram Upazila =

Parshuram পরশুরাম
- Upazila
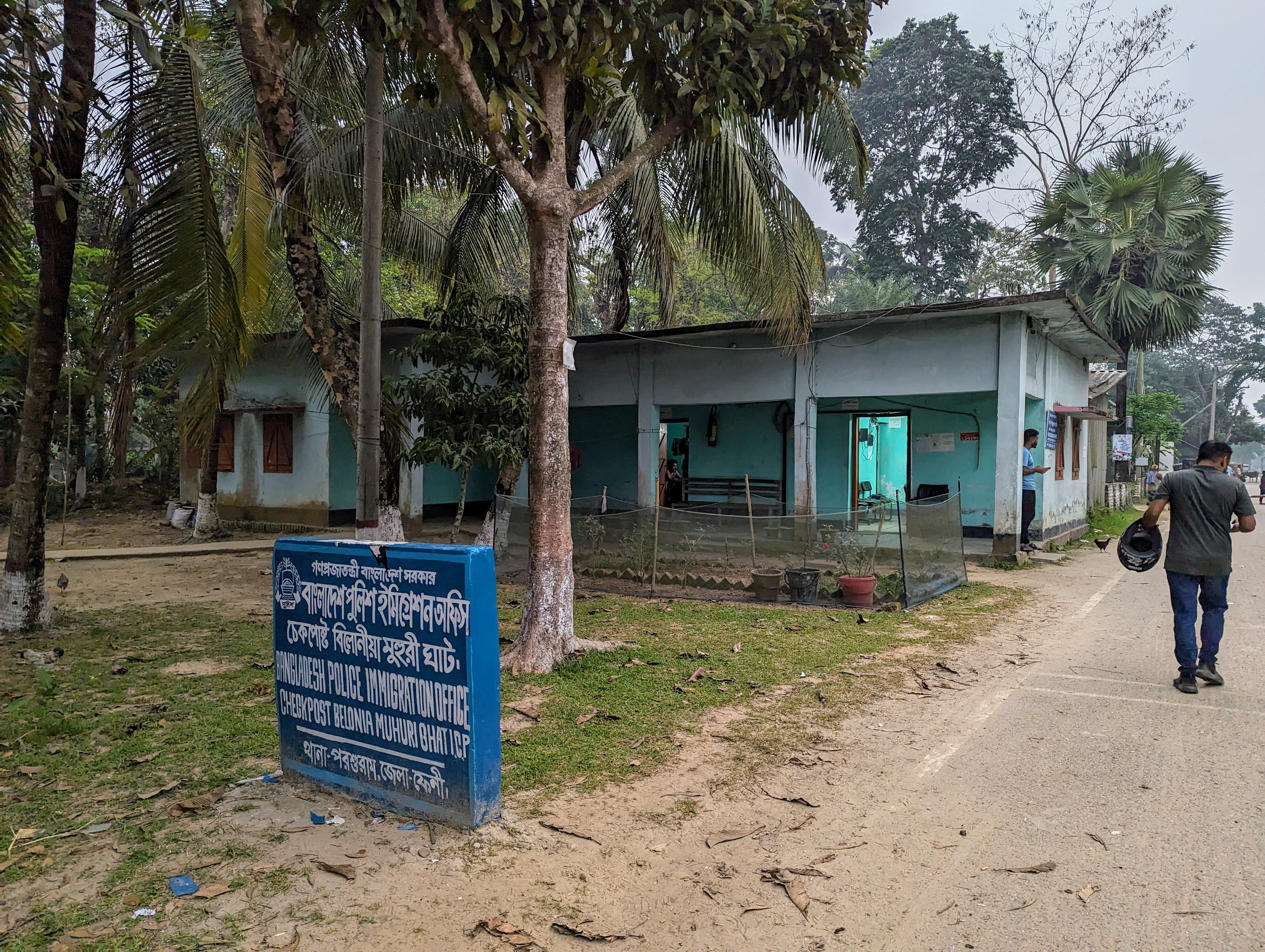
- Bangladesh Police Immigration Office, Parshuram

- Coordinates: 23°13′N 91°26.5′E
- Country: Bangladesh
- Division: Chittagong
- District: Feni

Government
  - Jatiyo Sangsad: Rafiqul Alam Majnu
  - Upazila Chairman: Kamal Uddin Mazumdar

Area
  - Total: 95.76 km^{2} (36.97 sq mi)

Population (2022)
  - Total: 113,317
  - Density: 1,183/km^{2} (3,065/sq mi)
- Time zone: UTC+6 (BST)
- Postal code: 3940
- Area code: 03324
- Website: Official Map of Parshuram

Parshuram Upazila mauza geocode map

Parshuram (Bengali: পরশুরাম) is an upazila of Feni District in Chattogram Division in southeast Bangladesh.

== Demographics ==
Religions in Parshuram Upazila (2022)
Religion	Percent
Islam	96.10%
Hinduism	3.87%
Other or not stated	0.03%

According to the 2022 Bangladeshi census, Parashuram Upazila had 25,926 households and a population of 113,317. 10.87% of the population were under 5 years of age. Parashuram had a literacy rate (age 7 and over) of 79.21%: 80.96% for males and 77.75% for females, and a sex ratio of 85.62 males for every 100 females. 36,112 (31.87%) lived in urban areas.

As of the 2011 Census of Bangladesh, Parshuram upazila had 20,353 households and a population of 101,062. 24,600 (24.34%) were under 10 years of age. Parshuram had an average literacy rate of 58.75%, compared to the national average of 51.8%, and a sex ratio of 1107 females per 1000 males. 29,691 (29.37%) of the population lived in urban areas.

== Administration ==
UNO: Afruza Habib Shapla.

Parshuram Upazila is divided into Parshuram Municipality and three union parishads: Boxmahmmud, Chitholia, and Mirzanagar. The union parishads are subdivided into 157 mauzas and 71 villages.

=== Municipality ===
Parshuram Municipality (or Parshuram Paurashava (Bengali: পরশুরাম পৌরসভা), or just Parshuram) is a town and municipality in Feni District. It is the administrative headquarters and urban centre of Parshuram Upazila. The municipality is subdivided into 9 wards and 15 mahallas. As of 2021, the municipal mayor is Nizamuddin Chowdhury.

== Notable Pearson ==
- MD NURUL ISLAM:- Social Analys
- Rafiqul Alam Majnu:- Member of Parliament, Feni 1
