= Districts of Bangladesh =

Second-level administrative divisions of Bangladesh

- Category: Administrative divisions
- Location: Bangladesh
- Created: 1972
- Number: 64
- Populations: Highest: 14,734,701 (Dhaka); Lowest: 481,106 (Bandarban)
- Areas: Largest: 6,116.11 km^{2} (2,361.44 sq mi) (Rangamati); Smallest: 684.35 km^{2} (264.23 sq mi) (Narayanganj)
- Government: Deputy commissioner (Administrator); Zila Parishad (Council)
- Subdivisions: Upazila councils (500)

The divisions of Bangladesh are further divided into districts or zilas (Bengali: জেলা). The headquarters of a district is called the district seat (Bengali: জেলা সদর, romanized: zila sadar). There are 64 districts in Bangladesh. The districts are further subdivided into 500 subdistricts or upazilas.

== History ==
Before independence, Bangladesh (then known as East Pakistan) had 19 districts.

=== English spelling change ===
In April 2018, the government changed the English spelling of five districts to avoid inconsistencies in the Bengali and English spellings and to make them consistent with the Bengali pronunciation. The spellings have been changed from Bogra to Bogura, Barisal to Barishal, Jessore to Jashore, Chittagong to Chattogram and Comilla to Cumilla.

== Administration ==
=== Deputy commissioner ===
A Deputy Commissioner (DC), popularly abbreviated to 'DC,' serves as the executive head of the district. Individuals appointed to the role are selected by the government from the Deputy Secretary BCS Administration Cadre.

=== District councils ===
A district council (or zila parishad) is a local government body at the district level. The Bengali word parishad means council and zila parishad translates to district council.

The functions of a district council include the construction and maintenance of roads and bridges. They are also responsible for building hospitals, dispensaries, schools, and other educational institutions. In addition, district councils oversee health facilities and sanitation projects, as well as the installation of tube wells for drinking water. They also manage rest houses and coordinate activities among the Union Parishads within the district.

== Timeline of creation ==
1666

- Chittagong District

1769

- Rangpur District

1772

- Dhaka District
- Rajshahi District

1781

- Jessore District

1782

- Sylhet District

1786

- Dinajpur District
- Faridpur District

1787

- Mymensingh District

1790

- Tipperah District (now Comilla District)

1797

- Bakerganj District (now Barisal District)

1821

- Bogra District was established from parts of Rajshahi, Rangpur, and Dinajpur districts

1822

- Noakhali District was split from Tipperah district (now Comilla District)

1832

- Pabna District was split from Rajshahi district

1860

- Chittagong Hill Tracts District (now Rangamati District) was split from Chittagong district

1882

- Khulna District was established from parts of 24 Parganas and Jessore districts

1947

- Kushtia District was established from Nadia district

1969

- Patuakhali District was split from Barisal District
- Tangail District was split from Mymensingh district

1971

- Dhaka Division: Dhaka district, Faridpur district, Mymensingh district, Tangail district
- Chittagong Division: Hill Tracts district, Chittagong district, Comilla district, Noakhali district, Sylhet district
- Rajshahi Division: Bogra district, Dinajpur district, Rajshahi district, Rangpur district, Pabna district
- Khulna Division: Barisal district, Jessore district, Khulna district, Kushtia district, Patuakhali district

1978

- Jamalpur District was split from Mymensingh district

1980

- Panchagarh District was split from Dinajpur district

1981

- Bandarban District was split from Rangamati district

1983

- Khagrachhari District was split from Rangamati district

1984

- Sirajganj District was split from Pabna district
- Gopalganj, Rajbari, Madaripur and Shariatpur districts were split from Faridpur district
- Kishoreganj and Netrokona districts were split from Mymensingh district
- Nilphamari, Gaibandha, Kurigram and Lalmonirhat districts were split from Rangpur district
- Thakurgaon District was split from Dinajpur district
- Chapai Nawabganj, Naogaon and Natore districts were split from Rajshahi District
- Brahmanbaria and Chandpur districts were split from Comilla district
- Gazipur, Narayanganj, Manikganj, Munshiganj and Narsingdi districts were split from Dhaka district
- Sherpur District was split from Jamalpur district
- Chuadanga and Meherpur districts were split from Kushtia district
- Cox's Bazar District was split from Chittagong district
- Bagerhat and Satkhira districts were split from Khulna district
- Joypurhat District was split from Bogra District
- Lakshmipur and Feni districts were split from Noakhali district
- Barguna and Bhola districts was split from Patuakhali district
- Pirojpur and Jhalokati districts were spilt from Barisal district
- Jhenaidah, Magura and Narail districts were split from Jessore district
- Habiganj, Moulvibazar and Sunamganj districts were split from Sylhet district

== List of districts ==
Division	District	Map	Est.	Area (km^{2})	Population (2022)	Density (/km^{2})	Seats in Parlament	No. of Upazila
Dhaka	Dhaka	Dhaka District	1772	1464	14,734,701	?	20	5
Dhaka	Faridpur	Faridpur District	1786	2053	2,162,876	1054	4	9
Dhaka	Tangail	Tangail District	1969	3414	4,037,608	1183	8	12
Dhaka	Gazipur	Gazipur District	1984	1806	5,263,474	2914	5	5
Dhaka	Narayanganj	Narayanganj District	1984	684	3,909,138	5712	5	5
Dhaka	Kishoreganj	Kishoreganj District	1984	2689	3,267,630	1215	6	13
Dhaka	Narsingdi	Narsingdi District	1984	1150	2,584,452	2247	5	6
Dhaka	Munshiganj	Munshiganj District	1984	1004	1,625,418	1618	3	6
Dhaka	Manikganj	Manikganj District	1984	1384	1,558,024	1126	3	7
Dhaka	Gopalganj	Gopalganj District	1984	1469	1,295,053	882	3	5
Dhaka	Shariatpur	Shariatpur District	1984	1174	1,294,561	1103	3	6
Dhaka	Madaripur	Madaripur District	1984	1125	1,293,027	1149	3	5
Dhaka	Rajbari	Rajbari District	1984	1092	1,189,821	1089	2	5
Chittagong	Chittagong	Chittagong District	1666	5283	9,169,464	1736	16	15
Chittagong	Cumilla	Comilla District	1790	3146	6,212,216	1974	11	17
Chittagong	Noakhali	Noakhali District	1822	3686	3,625,252	984	6	9
Chittagong	Rangamati	Rangamati District	1860	6116	647,587	106	1	10
Chittagong	Bandarban	Bandarban District	1981	4479	481,109	107	1	7
Chittagong	Khagrachhari	Khagrachhari District	1983	2749	714,119	260	1	9
Chittagong	Brahmanbaria	Brahmanbaria District	1984	1881	3,306,559	1758	6	9
Chittagong	Cox's Bazar	Cox's Bazar District	1984	2492	2,823,265	1133	4	9
Chittagong	Chandpur	Chandpur District	1984	1645	2,635,748	1602	5	8
Chittagong	Lakshmipur	Lakshmipur District	1984	1440	1,938,111	1346	4	5
Chittagong	Feni	Feni District	1984	990	1,648,896	1665	3	6
Rajshahi	Rajshahi	Rajshahi District	1772	2425	2,915,013	1202	6	9
Rajshahi	Bogura	Bogura District	1821	2899	3,734,300	1288	7	13
Rajshahi	Pabna	Pabna District	1832	2376	2,909,622	1225	5	9
Rajshahi	Joypurhat	Joypurhat District	1984	1012	956,430	945	6	5
Rajshahi	Sirajganj	Sirajganj District	1984	2402	3,357,708	1398	6	9
Rajshahi	Naogaon	Naogaon District	1984	3436	2,784,598	811	4	11
Rajshahi	Natore	Natore District	1984	1900	1,859,921	979	3	7
Rajshahi	Chapai Nawabganj	Chapai Nawabganj District	1984	1703	1,835,527	1078	2	5
Khulna	Jashore	Jashore District	1781	2607	3,076,849	1181	6	8
Khulna	Khulna	Khulna District	1882	4394	2,613,385	595	6	9
Khulna	Kushtia	Kushtia District	1947	1609	2,149,692	1336	4	6
Khulna	Satkhira	Satkhira District	1984	3817	2,196,581	574	4	7
Khulna	Jhenaidah	Jhenaidah District	1984	1965	1,771,304	902	4	6
Khulna	Bagerhat	Bagerhat District	1984	3959	1,613,079	407	4	9
Khulna	Chuadanga	Chuadanga District	1984	1174	1,234,066	1051	2	4
Khulna	Magura	Magura District	1984	1039	1,033,115	994	2	4
Khulna	Narail	Narail District	1984	968	788,673	815	2	3
Khulna	Meherpur	Meherpur District	1984	742	705,356	951	2	3
Barisal	Barishal	Barishal District	1797	2785	2,570,450	923	6	10
Barisal	Patuakhali	Patuakhali District	1969	3221	1,727,254	536	4	8
Barisal	Bhola	Bhola District	1984	3403	1,932,514	568	4	7
Barisal	Pirojpur	Pirojpur District	1984	1278	1,198,193	938	3	7
Barisal	Barguna	Barguna District	1984	1831	1,010,530	552	2	6
Barisal	Jhalokati	Jhalokati District	1984	707	661,161	935	2	4
Sylhet	Sylhet	Sylhet District	1782	3452	3,857,037	1117	6	13
Sylhet	Sunamganj	Sunamganj District	1984	3747	2,695,495	719	5	12
Sylhet	Habiganj	Habiganj District	1984	2637	2,358,886	895	4	9
Sylhet	Moulvibazar	Moulvibazar District	1984	2799	2,123,445	759	4	7
Rangpur	Rangpur	Rangpur District	1769	2401	3,169,615	1320	6	8
Rangpur	Nilphamari	Nilphamari District	1984	1547	3,092,567	1353	4	6
Rangpur	Dinajpur	Dinajpur District	1786	3444	3,315,238	963	6	13
Rangpur	Thakurgaon	Thakurgaon District	1984	1781	1,533,894	861	3	5
Rangpur	Gaibandha	Gaibandha District	1984	2115	2,562,232	1212	5	7
Rangpur	Kurigram	Kurigram District	1984	2245	2,329,161	1037	4	9
Rangpur	Lalmonirhat	Lalmonirhat District	1984	1247	1,428,406	1145	3	5
Rangpur	Panchagarh	Panchagarh District	1980	1405	1,179,843	840	2	5
Mymensingh	Mymensingh	Mymensingh District	1787	4395	5,899,052	1342	11	13
Mymensingh	Jamalpur	Jamalpur District	1978	2115	2,499,737	1182	5	7
Mymensingh	Netrokona	Netrokona District	1984	2794	2,324,856	832	5	10
Mymensingh	Sherpur	Sherpur District	1984	1365	1,501,853	1101	3	5
Total				147,556	164,924,071	1,118	300	495

== See also ==
- Divisions of Bangladesh
- Upazilas of Bangladesh
- Villages of Bangladesh
- Administrative geography of Bangladesh
