= List of municipal corporations in Bangladesh =

Pourashova (Bengali: পৌরসভা) are the Local Governing bodies of cities and towns in Bangladesh. There are 330 such Pourashova (Municipal Corporations) in eight divisions of Bangladesh. A Pourashova serving a town can also be called a Town Council, and a City Corporation serving a city is styled a City Council; these bodies are divided into wards, which are further divided into Mouzas and Mahallas. Direct elections are held for each ward, electing a chairperson and a number of members. The municipal heads are elected for a span of at least five years.

== Overview ==
Division	Headquarters	Pourashovas	Area (km^{2})	Population (2011)	Density (/km^{2}) (2011)
Barisal Division	Barisal	26	13,225.20	8,325,666	613
Chittagong Division	Chittagong	64	33,908.55	29,145,000	831
Dhaka Division	Dhaka	63	20,593.74	46,729,000	1,751
Khulna Division	Khulna	36	22,284.22	15,687,759	699
Mymensingh Division	Mymensingh	28	10,584.06	11,370,000	1,074
Rajshahi Division	Rajshahi	62	18,153.08	18,485,858	1,007
Rangpur Division	Rangpur	30	16,184.99	15,787,758	960
Sylhet Division	Sylhet	20	12,635.22	9,910,219	779
Total	(8)	330	147,570.00	149,772,364	1,015

== List of Pourashovas by Division ==
A clickable map of Bangladesh exhibiting its divisions.

Division	Districts	Pourashova
Barishal Division	Barishal District	Gaurnadi
Barishal Division	Barishal District	Muladi
Barishal Division	Barishal District	Bakerganj
Barishal Division	Barishal District	Mehendiganj
Barishal Division	Barishal District	Banaripara
Barishal Division	Barishal District	Wazirpur
Barishal Division	Barguna District	Barguna
Barishal Division	Barguna District	Patharghata
Barishal Division	Barguna District	Amtali
Barishal Division	Barguna District	Betagi
Barishal Division	Bhola District	Bhola
Barishal Division	Bhola District	Lalmohan
Barishal Division	Bhola District	Char Fasson
Barishal Division	Bhola District	Borhanuddin
Barishal Division	Bhola District	Daulatkhan
Barishal Division	Jhalokathi District	Jhalokati
Barishal Division	Jhalokathi District	Nalchity
Barishal Division	Pirojpur District	Pirojpur
Barishal Division	Pirojpur District	Swarupkathi
Barishal Division	Pirojpur District	Mathbaria
Barishal Division	Pirojpur District	Bhandharia
Barishal Division	Patuakhali District	Patuakhali
Barishal Division	Patuakhali District	Galachipa
Barishal Division	Patuakhali District	Bauphal
Barishal Division	Patuakhali District	Kalapara
Barishal Division	Patuakhali District	Kuakata
Chittagong Division	Chittagong District	Patia
Chittagong Division	Chittagong District	Dohazari
Chittagong Division	Chittagong District	Baraiyarhat
Chittagong Division	Chittagong District	Mirsharai
Chittagong Division	Chittagong District	Raozan
Chittagong Division	Chittagong District	Rangunia
Chittagong Division	Chittagong District	Bashkhali
Chittagong Division	Chittagong District	Satkania
Chittagong Division	Chittagong District	Sitakunda
Chittagong Division	Chittagong District	Chandanaish
Chittagong Division	Chittagong District	Fatikchhari
Chittagong Division	Chittagong District	Hathazari
Chittagong Division	Chittagong District	Nazirhat
Chittagong Division	Chittagong District	Sandwip
Chittagong Division	Chittagong District	Boalkhali
Chittagong Division	Cox's Bazar District	Cox's Bazar
Chittagong Division	Cox's Bazar District	Chakaria
Chittagong Division	Cox's Bazar District	Maheshkhali
Chittagong Division	Cox's Bazar District	Teknaf
Chittagong Division	Bandarban District	Bandarban
Chittagong Division	Bandarban District	Lama
Chittagong Division	Khagrachari District	Khagrachari
Chittagong Division	Khagrachari District	Ramgarh
Chittagong Division	Khagrachari District	Matiranga
Chittagong Division	Rangamati District	Rangamati
Chittagong Division	Rangamati District	Baghaichhari
Chittagong Division	Brahmanbaria District	Brahmanbaria
Chittagong Division	Brahmanbaria District	Bancharampur
Chittagong Division	Brahmanbaria District	Nabinagar
Chittagong Division	Brahmanbaria District	Akhaura
Chittagong Division	Brahmanbaria District	Kasba
Chittagong Division	Chandpur District	Chandpur
Chittagong Division	Chandpur District	Hajiganj
Chittagong Division	Chandpur District	Kachua
Chittagong Division	Chandpur District	Chengachar
Chittagong Division	Chandpur District	Matlab
Chittagong Division	Chandpur District	Shahrasti
Chittagong Division	Chandpur District	Faridganj
Chittagong Division	Chandpur District	Narayanpur
Chittagong Division	Comilla District	Laksham
Chittagong Division	Comilla District	Daudkandi
Chittagong Division	Comilla District	Chandina
Chittagong Division	Comilla District	Homna
Chittagong Division	Comilla District	Debidwar
Chittagong Division	Comilla District	Chauddagram
Chittagong Division	Comilla District	Nangalkot
Chittagong Division	Comilla District	Barura
Chittagong Division	Comilla District	Burichang
Chittagong Division	Feni District	Feni
Chittagong Division	Feni District	Daganbhuiyan
Chittagong Division	Feni District	Chhagalnaiya
Chittagong Division	Feni District	Parshuram
Chittagong Division	Feni District	Sonagazi
Chittagong Division	Laxmipur District	Lakshmipur
Chittagong Division	Laxmipur District	Raipur
Chittagong Division	Laxmipur District	Ramganj
Chittagong Division	Laxmipur District	Ramgati
Chittagong Division	Noakhali District	Noakhali
Chittagong Division	Noakhali District	Chowmuhani
Chittagong Division	Noakhali District	Chatkhil
Chittagong Division	Noakhali District	Bashurhat
Chittagong Division	Noakhali District	Kabirhat
Chittagong Division	Noakhali District	Sonaimuri
Chittagong Division	Noakhali District	Senbagh
Chittagong Division	Noakhali District	Hatiya
Dhaka Division	Dhaka District	Savar
Dhaka Division	Dhaka District	Dohar
Dhaka Division	Dhaka District	Dhamrai
Dhaka Division	Faridpur District	Faridpur
Dhaka Division	Faridpur District	Bhanga
Dhaka Division	Faridpur District	Boalmari
Dhaka Division	Faridpur District	Nagarkanda
Dhaka Division	Faridpur District	Madhukhali
Dhaka Division	Faridpur District	Alfadanga
Dhaka Division	Gazipur District	Kaliakoir
Dhaka Division	Gazipur District	Sreepur
Dhaka Division	Gazipur District	Kaliganj
Dhaka Division	Gopalganj District	Gopalganj
Dhaka Division	Gopalganj District	Kotalipara
Dhaka Division	Gopalganj District	Tungipara
Dhaka Division	Gopalganj District	Muksudpur
Dhaka Division	Kishoreganj District	Kishoreganj
Dhaka Division	Kishoreganj District	Bhairab
Dhaka Division	Kishoreganj District	Bajitpur
Dhaka Division	Kishoreganj District	Karimganj
Dhaka Division	Kishoreganj District	Hossainpur
Dhaka Division	Kishoreganj District	Kuliachar
Dhaka Division	Kishoreganj District	Katiadi
Dhaka Division	Kishoreganj District	Pakundia
Dhaka Division	Manikganj District	Manikganj
Dhaka Division	Manikganj District	Singair
Dhaka Division	Munshiganj District	Munshiganj
Dhaka Division	Munshiganj District	Mirkadim
Dhaka Division	Narayanganj District	Sonargaon
Dhaka Division	Narayanganj District	Tarabo
Dhaka Division	Narayanganj District	Kanchan
Dhaka Division	Narayanganj District	Araihazar
Dhaka Division	Narayanganj District	Gopladi
Dhaka Division	Narsingdi District	Narsingdi
Dhaka Division	Narsingdi District	Madhabdi
Dhaka Division	Narsingdi District	Ghorashal
Dhaka Division	Narsingdi District	Monohardi
Dhaka Division	Narsingdi District	Shibpur
Dhaka Division	Narsingdi District	Raipura
Dhaka Division	Rajbari District	Rajbari
Dhaka Division	Rajbari District	Pangsha
Dhaka Division	Rajbari District	Goalundo
Dhaka Division	Tangail District	Tangail
Dhaka Division	Tangail District	Gopalpur
Dhaka Division	Tangail District	Ghatail
Dhaka Division	Tangail District	Madhupur
Dhaka Division	Tangail District	Sakhipur
Dhaka Division	Tangail District	Kalihati
Dhaka Division	Tangail District	Dhanbari
Dhaka Division	Tangail District	Basail
Dhaka Division	Tangail District	Bhuapur
Dhaka Division	Tangail District	Mirzapur
Dhaka Division	Tangail District	Elenga
Dhaka Division	Shariatpur District	Shariatpur
Dhaka Division	Shariatpur District	Damudya
Dhaka Division	Shariatpur District	Naria
Dhaka Division	Shariatpur District	Jazeera
Dhaka Division	Shariatpur District	Bhedarganj
Dhaka Division	Shariatpur District	Gosairhat
Dhaka Division	Madaripur District	Madaripur
Dhaka Division	Madaripur District	Shibchar
Dhaka Division	Madaripur District	Kalkini
Dhaka Division	Madaripur District	Rajoir
Khulna Division	Khulna District	Paikgacha
Khulna Division	Khulna District	Chalna
Khulna Division	Jessore District	Jessore
Khulna Division	Jessore District	Benapole
Khulna Division	Jessore District	Jhikargacha
Khulna Division	Jessore District	Noapara
Khulna Division	Jessore District	Bagharpara
Khulna Division	Jessore District	Keshabpur
Khulna Division	Jessore District	Monirampur
Khulna Division	Jessore District	Chaugacha
Khulna Division	Jhenaidah District	Jhenaidah
Khulna Division	Jhenaidah District	Harinakunda
Khulna Division	Jhenaidah District	Kaliganj
Khulna Division	Jhenaidah District	Kotchandpur
Khulna Division	Jhenaidah District	Maheshpur
Khulna Division	Jhenaidah District	Shailakupa
Khulna Division	Magura District	Magura
Khulna Division	Narail District	Narail
Khulna Division	Narail District	Kalia
Khulna Division	Narail District	Lohagara
Khulna Division	Bagerhat District	Bagerhat
Khulna Division	Bagerhat District	Mongla Port
Khulna Division	Bagerhat District	Morrelgonj
Khulna Division	Satkhira District	Satkhira
Khulna Division	Satkhira District	Shyamnagar
Khulna Division	Satkhira District	Kalaroa
Khulna Division	Chuadanga District	Chuadanga
Khulna Division	Chuadanga District	Alamdanga
Khulna Division	Chuadanga District	Darshana
Khulna Division	Chuadanga District	Jibannagar
Khulna Division	Kushtia District	Kushtia
Khulna Division	Kushtia District	Khoksa
Khulna Division	Kushtia District	Kumarkhali
Khulna Division	Kushtia District	Mirpur
Khulna Division	Kushtia District	Bheramara
Khulna Division	Meherpur District	Meherpur
Khulna Division	Meherpur District	Gangni
Mymensingh Division	Mymensingh District	Gafargaon
Mymensingh Division	Mymensingh District	Trishal
Mymensingh Division	Mymensingh District	Muktagacha
Mymensingh Division	Mymensingh District	Ishwarganj
Mymensingh Division	Mymensingh District	Bhaluka
Mymensingh Division	Mymensingh District	Gauripur
Mymensingh Division	Mymensingh District	Phulpur
Mymensingh Division	Mymensingh District	Fulbaria
Mymensingh Division	Mymensingh District	Nandail
Mymensingh Division	Mymensingh District	Haluaghat
Mymensingh Division	Jamalpur District	Jamalpur
Mymensingh Division	Jamalpur District	Sarishabari
Mymensingh Division	Jamalpur District	Islampur
Mymensingh Division	Jamalpur District	Dewanganj
Mymensingh Division	Jamalpur District	Melandaha
Mymensingh Division	Jamalpur District	Madarganj
Mymensingh Division	Jamalpur District	Hazrabari
Mymensingh Division	Jamalpur District	Bakshianj
Mymensingh Division	Sherpur District	Sherpur
Mymensingh Division	Sherpur District	Nalitbari
Mymensingh Division	Sherpur District	Nakla
Mymensingh Division	Sherpur District	Sreebordi
Mymensingh Division	Netrokona District	Netrokona
Mymensingh Division	Netrokona District	Mohonganj
Mymensingh Division	Netrokona District	Durgapur
Mymensingh Division	Netrokona District	Kendua
Mymensingh Division	Netrokona District	Madan
Rajshahi Division	Rajshahi District	Godagari
Rajshahi Division	Rajshahi District	Gogram
Rajshahi Division	Rajshahi District	Kakanahata
Rajshahi Division	Rajshahi District	Katakhali
Rajshahi Division	Rajshahi District	Tanore
Rajshahi Division	Rajshahi District	Mundumala
Rajshahi Division	Rajshahi District	Naohata
Rajshahi Division	Rajshahi District	Keshor
Rajshahi Division	Rajshahi District	Bhabaniganj
Rajshahi Division	Rajshahi District	Taherpur
Rajshahi Division	Rajshahi District	Durgapur
Rajshahi Division	Rajshahi District	Puthiya
Rajshahi Division	Rajshahi District	Charhat
Rajshahi Division	Rajshahi District	Bagha
Rajshahi Division	Bogura District	Nandigram
Rajshahi Division	Bogura District	Dhunat
Rajshahi Division	Bogura District	Amtali
Rajshahi Division	Bogura District	Gabtali
Rajshahi Division	Bogura District	Dhupchachia
Rajshahi Division	Bogura District	Sonatala
Rajshahi Division	Bogura District	Mahal
Rajshahi Division	Bogura District	Santahar
Rajshahi Division	Bogura District	Sariakandi
Rajshahi Division	Bogura District	Shibganj
Rajshahi Division	Bogura District	Sherpur
Rajshahi Division	Bogura District	Talora
Rajshahi Division	Joypurhat District	Joypurhat
Rajshahi Division	Joypurhat District	Panchbibi
Rajshahi Division	Joypurhat District	Kalai
Rajshahi Division	Joypurhat District	Akkelpur
Rajshahi Division	Joypurhat District	Khetlal
Rajshahi Division	Pabna District	Pabna
Rajshahi Division	Pabna District	Atgharia
Rajshahi Division	Pabna District	Chatmohar
Rajshahi Division	Pabna District	Bhangura
Rajshahi Division	Pabna District	Iswardi
Rajshahi Division	Pabna District	Sathiya
Rajshahi Division	Pabna District	Bera
Rajshahi Division	Pabna District	Sujanagar
Rajshahi Division	Pabna District	Faridpur
Rajshahi Division	Sirajganj District	Sirajganj
Rajshahi Division	Sirajganj District	Shahzadpur
Rajshahi Division	Sirajganj District	Raiganj
Rajshahi Division	Sirajganj District	Ullahpara
Rajshahi Division	Sirajganj District	Kazipur
Rajshahi Division	Sirajganj District	Belkuchi
Rajshahi Division	Sirajganj District	Tarash
Rajshahi Division	Naogaon District	Naogaon
Rajshahi Division	Naogaon District	Dhamuirahata
Rajshahi Division	Naogaon District	Nazipur
Rajshahi Division	Natore District	Natore
Rajshahi Division	Natore District	Naldanga
Rajshahi Division	Natore District	Singra
Rajshahi Division	Natore District	Gurdaspur
Rajshahi Division	Natore District	Gopalpur
Rajshahi Division	Natore District	Boraigram
Rajshahi Division	Natore District	Bonpara
Rajshahi Division	Natore District	Bogatipara
Rajshahi Division	Chapai Nawabganj District	Chapai Nawabganj
Rajshahi Division	Chapai Nawabganj District	Shibganj
Rajshahi Division	Chapai Nawabganj District	Rohanpur
Rajshahi Division	Chapai Nawabganj District	Nachol
Rangpur Division	Rangpur District	Badarganj
Rangpur Division	Rangpur District	Pirganj
Rangpur Division	Rangpur District	Haragach
Rangpur Division	Dinajpur District	Dinajpur
Rangpur Division	Dinajpur District	Birampur
Rangpur Division	Dinajpur District	Birganj
Rangpur Division	Dinajpur District	Setabganj
Rangpur Division	Dinajpur District	Fulbari
Rangpur Division	Dinajpur District	Parbatipur
Rangpur Division	Dinajpur District	Hakimpur
Rangpur Division	Dinajpur District	Ghoraghat
Rangpur Division	Dinajpur District	Birol
Rangpur Division	Panchagarh District	Panchagarh
Rangpur Division	Panchagarh District	Boda
Rangpur Division	Panchagarh District	Debiganj
Rangpur Division	Thakurgaon District	Thakurgaon
Rangpur Division	Thakurgaon District	Pirganj
Rangpur Division	Thakurgaon District	Ranisankail
Rangpur Division	Gaibandha District	Gaibandha
Rangpur Division	Gaibandha District	Gobindaganj
Rangpur Division	Gaibandha District	Sundarganj
Rangpur Division	Gaibandha District	Palashbari
Rangpur Division	Kurigram District	Kurigram
Rangpur Division	Kurigram District	Nageshwari
Rangpur Division	Kurigram District	Ulipur
Rangpur Division	Lalmonirhat District	Lalmonirhat
Rangpur Division	Lalmonirhat District	Patgram
Rangpur Division	Nilphamari District	Nilphamari
Rangpur Division	Nilphamari District	Saidpur
Rangpur Division	Nilphamari District	Domar
Rangpur Division	Nilphamari District	Jaldhaka
Sylhet Division	Sylhet District	Golapganj
Sylhet Division	Sylhet District	Beanibazar
Sylhet Division	Sylhet District	Kanaighat
Sylhet Division	Sylhet District	Zakiganj
Sylhet Division	Sylhet District	Biswanath
Sylhet Division	Habiganj District	Habiganj
Sylhet Division	Habiganj District	Shaistaganj
Sylhet Division	Habiganj District	Nabiganj
Sylhet Division	Habiganj District	Madhabpur
Sylhet Division	Habiganj District	Chunarughat
Sylhet Division	Habiganj District	Ajmiriganj
Sylhet Division	Sunamganj District	Sunamganj
Sylhet Division	Sunamganj District	Chhatak
Sylhet Division	Sunamganj District	Jagannathpur
Sylhet Division	Sunamganj District	Derai
Sylhet Division	Sunamganj District	Taherpur
Sylhet Division	Moulvibazar District	Moulvibazar
Sylhet Division	Moulvibazar District	Sreemangal
Sylhet Division	Moulvibazar District	Barlekha
Sylhet Division	Moulvibazar District	Kulaura
Sylhet Division	Moulvibazar District	Kamalganj

== See also ==
- List of city corporations in Bangladesh
- List of cities and towns in Bangladesh
