= List of cities and towns in Bangladesh =

This article presents a list of cities and towns in Bangladesh. According to the Bangladesh Bureau of Statistics and the Ministry of Local Government, Rural Development and Co-operatives of Bangladesh, there are 532 urban centres in Bangladesh.

Location of major cities in Bangladesh

The bureau defines an urban centre with a population of 100,000 or more as a "city". Altogether, there are 43 such cities in Bangladesh. 13 of these cities can be considered major cities as these are governed by city corporations. All of city corporation-governed cities currently have a population of more than 200,000, which is not a criterion for the status, because currently 17 cities in Bangladesh have a population of more than 200,000. Besides the nine major cities, there are 32 other cities in Bangladesh that are not governed by city corporations and rather by municipal corporations. A city with a population of more than 10,000,000 is defined by the bureau as a megacity. Dhaka is the only megacity in Bangladesh according to this definition. Together, Dhaka and the port city of Chittagong account for 48% of the country's urban population.

An urban centre with a population of less than 100,000 is defined as a "town". In total, there are 490 such towns in Bangladesh. Among these, 287 towns are governed by "municipal corporations". These are called "paurashavas" in the local Bengali language. Altogether, including the ones governing the 32 other non-major cities, there are 330 municipalities.

In addition, there are another 203 towns which are upazila centres (and other urban centres) and not governed by any municipal corporation or "paurashava". These are the non-municipal corporation or "non-paurashava" towns.

In 1951, Bangladesh was mostly a rural country and only 4% of the population lived in urban centres. The urban population rose to 20% in 1991 and to 24% by 2001. In 2011, Bangladesh had an urban population of 28% and the rate of urban population growth was estimated at 2.8%. At this growth rate, Bangladesh's urban population would reach 79 million or 42% of the population by 2035. The urban centers of Bangladesh have a combined area of about 10600 square kilometers, which is 7% of the total area of Bangladesh. As such, Bangladesh has a very high urban population density: 4028 persons per square kilometer (2011), whereas the rural density is significantly lower: 790 persons per square kilometer (2011). The number of municipalities tripled from 104 municipalities in 1991 to 318 municipalities in 2011, and currently 330.

== Major cities ==
City	Population (2022)	Area	District	Division
Dhaka	10,295,786	305.46	Dhaka	Dhaka
Chittagong	3,230,507	155.4	Chittagong	Chittagong
Gazipur	2,677,715	329.53	Gazipur	Dhaka
Narayanganj	967,951	72.43	Narayanganj	Dhaka
Khulna	719,557	45.65	Khulna	Khulna
Rangpur	708,570	205.7	Rangpur	Rangpur
Mymensingh	577,000	91.315	Mymensingh	Mymensingh
Rajshahi	553,288	96.72	Rajshahi	Rajshahi
Sylhet	532,839	79.5	Sylhet	Sylhet
Bogura	486,016	69.56	Bogura	Rajshahi
Cumilla	440,233	53.04	Cumilla	Chittagong
Barishal	419,484	58	Barishal	Barishal

== Major cities ==
There are 46 cities in Bangladesh. Among them, 12 are governed by city corporations and others are governed by municipal corporations (pourashava).

== Notable towns ==
The following is a list of notable towns in Bangladesh governed by municipal corporations with population of less than 100,000.

Division	Towns
Dhaka Division	Madaripur; Manikganj; Munshiganj; Rajbari; Shariatpur; Bhuapur; Dhanbari; Elenga; Ghatail; Gopalpur; Kalihati; Katiadi; Madhabdi; Madhupur; Mirzapur; Monohardi; Pangsha; Sakhipur
Chattogram Division	Bandarban; Khagrachhari; Baghaichhari; Baraiyarhat; Chakaria; Chandanaish; Chhagalnaiya; Daganbhuiyan; Daudkandi; Dohazari; Fatikchhari; Hajiganj; Laksam; Lama; Maheshkhali; Matiranga; Matlab; Mirsharai; Nazirhat; Parshuram; Ramgarh; Rangunia; Sitakunda; Teknaf
Khulna Division	Bagerhat; Chuadanga; Meherpur; Narail; Benapole; Darshana; Kalaroa; Keshabpur; Khoksa; Kumarkhali; Mirpur; Noapara; Tungipara
Rajshahi Division	Natore; Mundumala; Nazipur; Rohanpur
Sylhet Division	Habiganj; Moulvibazar; Sunamganj; Chhatak; Derai
Barishal Division	Barguna; Bhola; Jhalokati; Patuakhali; Pirojpur; Amtali; Bakerganj; Bauphal; Bhandaria; Borhanuddin; Daulatkhan; Galachipa; Gournadi; Kuakata; Mathbaria; Mehendiganj; Nalchity; Swarupkati; Wazirpur
Rangpur Division	Gaibandha; Joypurhat; Kurigram; Lalmonirhat; Nilphamari; Panchagarh; Birganj; Boda
Mymensingh Division	Gouripur; Ishwarganj; Muktagachha; Phulpur; Trishal

== See also ==
- List of cities of Bangladesh by population
- List of city corporations in Bangladesh
- List of municipal corporations in Bangladesh
- List of villages in Bangladesh
- List of cities in Asia
