= Balakhal =

Balakhal বলাখাল
- Location in Bangladesh
- Coordinates: 23°16′N 90°49′E
- Country: Bangladesh
- Division: Chittagong Division
- District: Chandpur District
- Upazila: Haziganj Upazila
- Time zone: UTC+6 (Bangladesh Time)
- Post code: 3611
- Area code: +880

Balakhal is a semi-urban area in Chandpur District in the Chittagong Division of eastern Bangladesh. It is under Haziganj Upazila and Municipality. It stands on the bank of the Dakatia River.

== Infrastructure ==
- Railway Station
- Bus Stop
- Daily Marketplace (Bazar)
- Cumilla - Chandpur Road (R140)
- Balakhal - Ramchandrapur Road
- Balakhal- Kashimpur Road
- Balakhal - Rampur Road
- Balakhal - Protappur Road
- Bridge on the Dakatia River

== Institutions ==
- Intermediate and Degree College–1
- Technical College
- High Schools - 2
- Boys Hostel
- Boys School
- Girls School
- Primary Schools - 3
- Madrasha–1
- Mosques - 10
- Eidgah
- Hindu Temples - 6
- Family planning clinics - 1
- Social Welfare Center
- Post Office 1
- Microwave Station 1
- Rural electricity power station

== Amenities ==
- Electricity from Rural Electrification Board
- Natural Gas supply for home and factory
- Water supply from municipality
- TV cable connection
- Home phone connection
- Ground transportations - bus, autos and train
- Playgrounds, Football and cricket fields

== Shops and factories ==
- Internet Cafe, Computer Center, Cellular Centers, Photo and Multimedia Studios
- Restaurants and Sweetmeats
- Groceries and Confectionaries
- Clothing, Boutiques and utensils
- Live Poultry, Fish Market and Butcher Shops
- Tailors, Goldsmiths, Blacksmiths, Barber shops
- Rural Doctors and Pharmacies
- Agriculture Supplies, Sanitary Supplies, Steel and Woodwork
- Bakery
- Ice cream factory
- Rice Mills
- Saw Mill

== Attractions ==
- Boishakhi Mela on the Pohela Boishakh (Bengali new year)
- Big Dighis (lakes and lagoons)
- Big banyan trees
- Dakatia River
- Ramchandrapur Bridge (Bakultola)
