= Laksam Government Pilot High School =

Laksam Pilot Government High School
- লাকসাম সরকারি পাইলট উচ্চ বিদ্যালয়

Location
- New Road; Laksam, Bangladesh, Chittagong, 3570; 23.2382°N 91.1221°E

Information
- Other name: Laksam School
- Former name: Atul High School
- School type: Secondary school
- Established: 1923
- School board: Board of Intermediate and Secondary Education, Comilla
- School code: 105855
- Headmaster: Md. Md. Delowar Hossen (acting)
- Language: Bengali, English
- Campus type: urban
- Sports: Football

Laksam Pilot Government High School (Bengali: লাকসাম সরকারি পাইলট উচ্চ বিদ্যালয়) is a secondary school situated at Laksam, Comilla District, Bangladesh. It is situated at New Road in the Laksam municipality.

== History ==
Laksam Government Pilot High School.

== Campus ==
The school is located in the heart of Laksam Upazila of Comilla District, it is situated at New Road, near Laksam Bazar and Laksam Bypass.

== Academics ==
Admission to the 6th grade is by lottery.

Students take two board exams, the Junior School Certificate (JSC) and the Secondary School Certificate (SSC). Both are conducted by the Board of Intermediate and Secondary Education, Comilla.

In the 2018 JSC examination, 100% of students passed.

== Notable alumni ==
- Biplob Bhattacharjee, goalkeeper for the Bangladesh national football team

== See also ==
- Laksam Nawab Faizunnesa Government College
- Laksam Nawab Faizunnesa and Badrunnesa Amalgamated High School
- Laksam Al Amin Institute
- Laksam Nawab Bari
