= Birganj, Bangladesh =

Birganj বীরগঞ্জ
- Town and Municipality
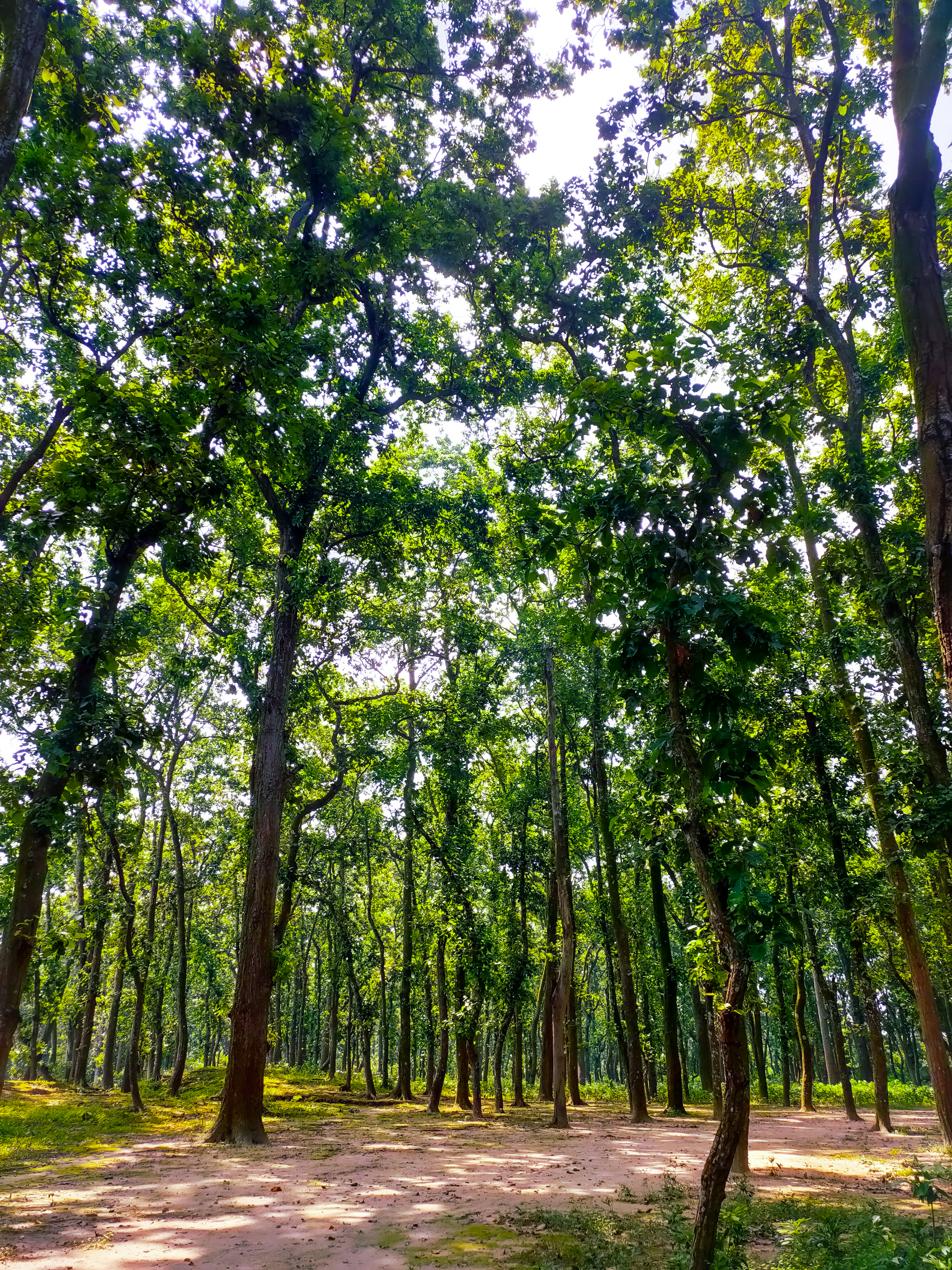
- Birganj National Park

- Location in Rangpur Division Location in Bangladesh
- Coordinates: 25°51′44″N 88°39′15″E
- Country: Bangladesh
- Division: Rangpur
- District: Dinajpur
- Upazila: Birganj
- Municipality: 15 June 2002

Government
  - Type: Paurashava
  - Body: Birganj Municipality

Area
  - Total: 10.08 km^{2} (3.89 sq mi)

Population (2022)
  - Total: 23,534
  - Density: 2,335/km^{2} (6,047/sq mi)
  - Ethnicities: Bengali
- Time zone: UTC+6 (BST)
- Postal code: 5220
- Area code: 05323
- National Dialing Code: +880
- Website: birganjpaurashava.gov.bd

Birganj Municipality mahallah geocode map

Birganj (Bengali: বীরগঞ্জ) is a town and municipality in northern Bangladesh, serving as the administrative headquarters of Birganj Upazila in Dinajpur District, Rangpur Division. Situated near the banks of the Dhepa River along the major highway connecting Dinajpur and Panchagarh, it serves as the upazila's main commercial and economic hub. The town is governed by the Birganj Municipality, which provides urban infrastructure administration and utility services for its residents.

== History ==
Birganj is an ancient regional settlement historically integrated within the greater Rangpur and ancient Dinajpur jurisdictions. The area expanded over centuries as a vital marketplace town. During the British colonial administration, administrative consolidation led to the formal establishment of the Birganj Police Station (Thana) in 1890. Following the decentralized restructuring implemented by the government of Bangladesh, the thana was converted into an upazila in 1983, turning the town into its core bureaucratic center.

To manage ongoing urban development and support municipal functions, Birganj Municipality (Paurashava) was officially established on 15 June 2002 under the initiation of regional civic leaders and the local administration. Owing to regular civic development and systemic revenue growth, the municipality was upgraded from a 'C' grade to a 'B' grade urban unit on 11 September 2006.

== Geography ==
Birganj is located at 25°51′44″ north latitudes and 88°39′15″ east longitudes. It is situated in the far northwestern geographical reach of Bangladesh. The municipal boundaries encompass a total calculated area of 10.08 square kilometres (3.89 sq mi). The town is situated within the broader Old Himalayan Piedmont Plain, featuring predominantly flat terrain consisting of ancient fertile alluvial soil profiles. The Dhepa River flows nearby along the edge of the urban settlement, shaping the hydrological and environmental landscape of the town.

== Administration ==
Birganj Municipality was established in 2002 and is divided into 9 wards and 11 mahallas. The municipality consists of designated urban parts of the Sujalpur Union. The administrative framework operates under the Local Government Division, coordinating local public assets, drainage infrastructure, marketplaces, and basic civic services in partnership with the upazila administration.

== Demographics ==
Religions in Birganj Municipality (2022)
Religion	Percent
Islam	79.24%
Hinduism	18.42%
Christianity	1.10%
Others	1.24%

According to the 2022 Bangladesh census, Birganj Paurashava had 5,901 households and a total population of 23,534, consisting of 11,757 males and 11,776 females. The literacy rate for the municipality (aged 7 years and above) was 86.08%, with male literacy at 88.58% and female literacy at 83.59%. Birganj Municipality has a sex ratio of 99.84 males per 100 females.

== Education ==
Birganj hosts several traditional and primary, secondary, and higher secondary institutions serving the urban limits and close rural extensions. Notable educational centers located within the town include Birganj Government College, Birganj Pilot Government High School, and Birganj Government Girls' High School.

== See also ==
- List of cities and towns in Bangladesh
- Upazilas of Bangladesh
