= Moheshkhali (disambiguation) =

Moheshkhali is a town in Cox's Bazar District. It may also refer to:

- Moheshkhali Upazila, a upazila of Cox’s Bazar District.
- Moheshkhali Island, one of the three islands in Moheshkhali Upazila.
