= Monohorgonj Upazila =

Monohorgonj মনোহরগঞ্জ
- Upazila
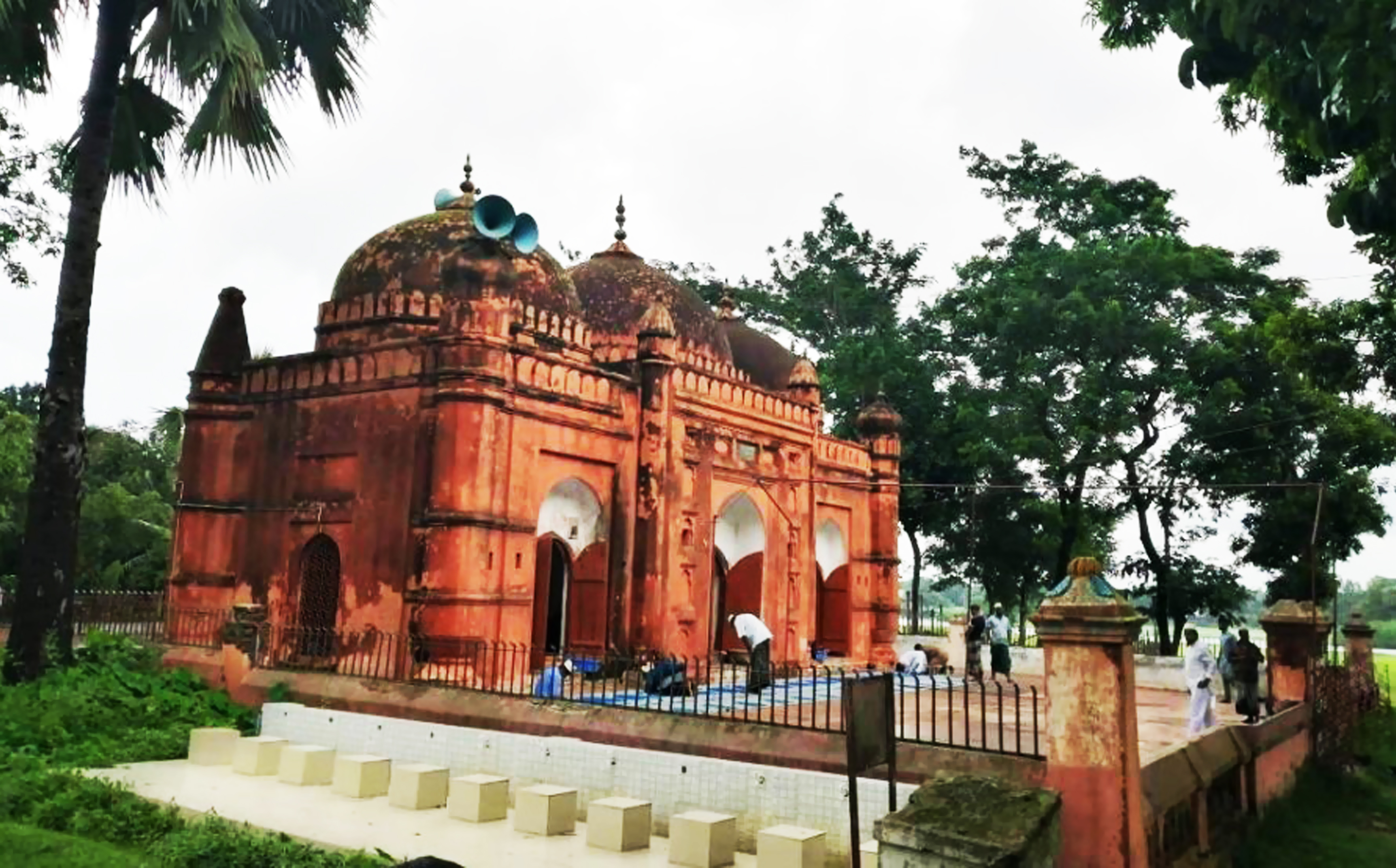
- Bara Sharifpur Jame Masjid

- Coordinates: 23°10′N 91°4′E
- Country: Bangladesh
- Division: Chittagong
- District: Comilla

Area
  - Total: 166.50 km^{2} (64.29 sq mi)

Population (2022)
  - Total: 275,715
  - Density: 1,655.9/km^{2} (4,288.9/sq mi)
- Time zone: UTC+6 (BST)
- Postal code: 3571 (Laxmanpur)
- Postal code: 3572 (Bipulashar)
- Website: monohargonj.comilla.gov.bd

Monohorgonj (Bengali: মনোহরগঞ্জ উপজেলা) is an upazila of Comilla District in the Division of Chittagong, Bangladesh.

== History ==
The upazila was formed in 2005 with 11 unions from the southern region of erstwhile Laksam upazila.

== Demographics ==
Religions in Manoharganj Upazila (2022)
Religion	Percent
Islam	97.22%
Hinduism	2.76%
Other or not stated	0.02%

According to the 2022 Bangladeshi census, Manoharganj Upazila had 58,532 households and a population of 275,715. 11.46% of the population were under 5 years of age. Manoharganj had a literacy rate (age 7 and over) of 79.06%: 79.19% for males and 78.96% for females, and a sex ratio of 82.87 males for every 100 females. 28,207 (10.23%) lived in urban areas.

According to the 2011 Census of Bangladesh, Manoharganj Upazila had 44,847 households and a population of 244,943. 67,031 (27.37%) were under 10 years of age. Manoharganj has a literacy rate (age 7 and over) of 50.41%, compared to the national average of 51.8%, and a sex ratio of 1180 females per 1000 males. 1,189 (0.49%) lived in urban areas.

== Geography ==
Monohorgonj Upazila is located in the southern part of Comilla District in Bangladesh. The Dakatia River runs through the upazila. This upazila is bounded by Laksam upazila on the north, Nangalkot upazila on the east, Senbagh, Sonaimuri and Chatkhil upazilas of Noakhali district on the south and Shahrasti upazila of Chandpur district on the west.

Manoharganj Upazila Complex (Upazila Parishad) is located at Khodai Vita on the south side of Manoharganj Bazar along the banks of Dakatiya river.

=== Rivers ===
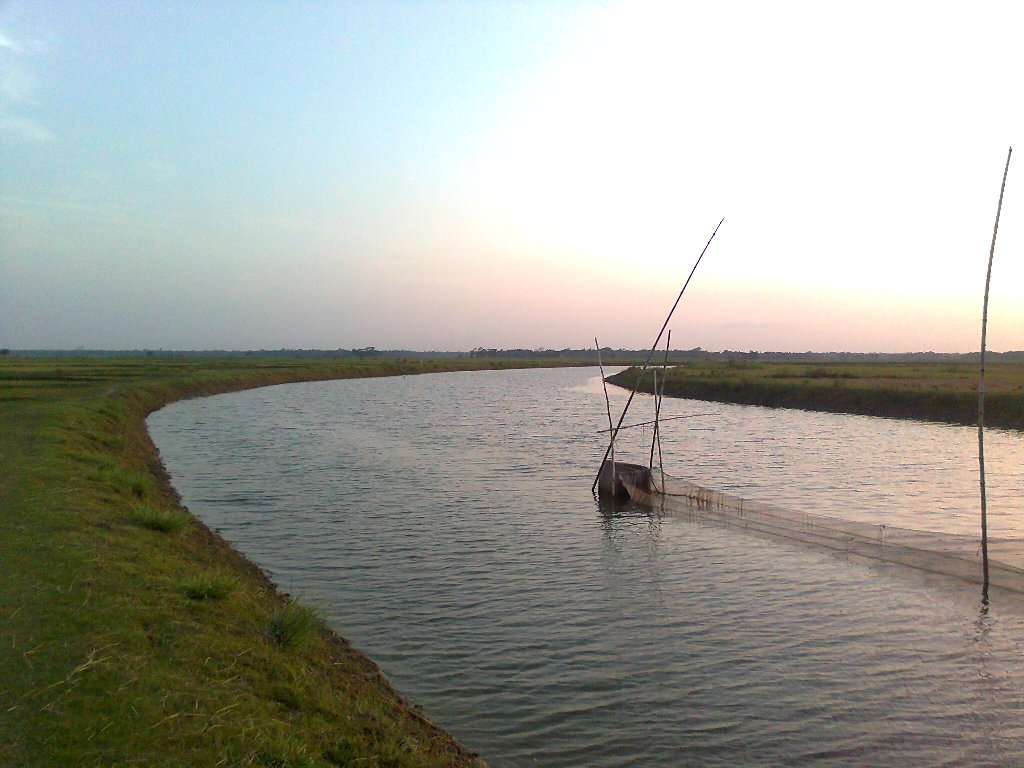
The river of Dakatia

Notable and only river of this upazila is Dakatia River. This Upazila is situated on the banks of this river. A dam has been built by the Water Development Board toward one side of the waterway close to the Upazila. Once this river was the main medium of communication with Monohorgonj Upazila. Even today, to some extent, goods are transported on that river.

== Administration ==
Monohorgonj Upazila is divided into 11 union parishads: Baishgaon, Bipulashar, Hasnabad, Jhalam Dakshin, Jhalam Uttar, Khela, Lokkhanpur, Moishatua, Natherpetua, Shoroshpur, and Uttar Howla. The union parishads are subdivided into 145 mauzas and 181 villages.

== Education ==
Currently there are 2 government colleges, 2 private colleges, 1 government high school, 27 total high schools, 26 madrasas, 105 government primary schools. The literacy rate of this Upazila is:

- Average-48.74%
- Male-50.38%
- Female-47.19%

== Economy ==
The economy of this upazila is largely dependent on agriculture. No natural assets, for example, oil, gas, or coal mineshafts were found in this Upazila. The people of this territory make a living by creating agricultural products, grains, and fishing.

== See also ==
- Upazilas of Bangladesh
- Districts of Bangladesh
- Divisions of Bangladesh
