= Muhammad Shamsul Huq =

Bangladeshi politician and educator (1912–2006)

- মুহাম্মদ শামসুল হক
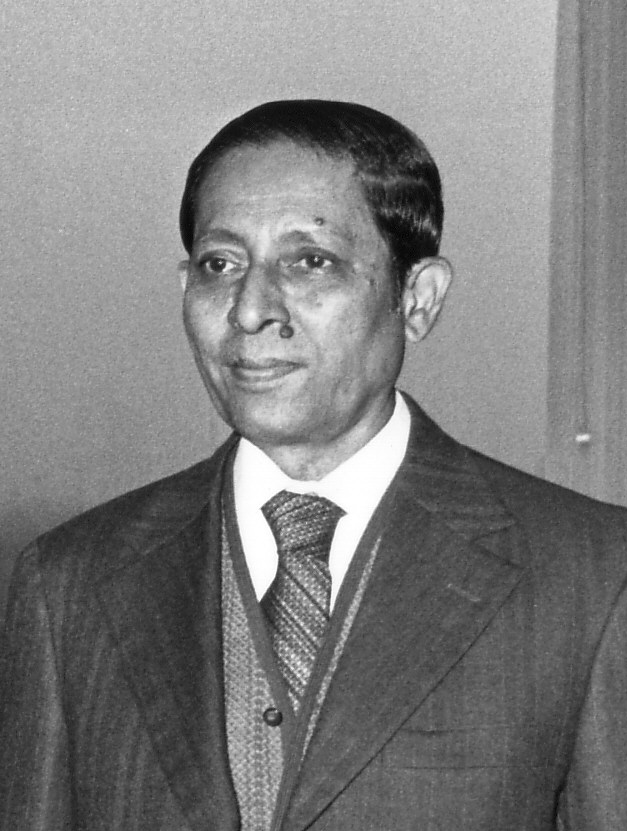
- Shamsul Huq as the Bangladesh minister of foreign affairs in Brussels (1979)

Vice-Chancellor of the University of Dhaka
- In office 23 September 1975 – 1 February 1976
- Preceded by: Abdul Matin Chowdhury
- Succeeded by: Fazlul Halim Chowdhury

Vice-Chancellor of the University of Rajshahi
- In office 1965–1969
- Preceded by: Momtazuddin Ahmed
- Succeeded by: Syed Sajjad Hussain

Foreign Minister of Bangladesh
- In office March 1977 – March 1982
- Preceded by: Abu Sayeed Chowdhury
- Succeeded by: A R Shamsud Doha

Personal details
- Born: 12 October 1912 Pashchimgaon, Laksam, Tippera, Eastern Bengal and Assam, British India
- Died: 23 February 2006 (aged 93) Dhaka, Bangladesh
- Education: Islamia College; University of Calcutta
- Profession: University academic
- Awards: Ekushey Padak (2003)

Muhammad Shamsul Huq (12 October 1912 – 23 February 2006) was a Bangladeshi politician and educator. He served as an education minister in erstwhile East Pakistan, and became the minister of foreign affairs six years after the independence of Bangladesh. Shamsul Huq also served as vice-chancellor in both the University of Dhaka and University of Rajshahi. He was awarded the Ekushey Padak in 2003 by the government of Bangladesh.

== Early life and education ==
Shamsul Huq was born on 12 October 1912 to a Bengali Muslim parents Karimul Huq and Mahmuda Khatun in the village of Pashchimgaon in Laksam, Tipperah District, Bengal Province. In 1927, he passed his matriculation exam from the local Faizunnisa-Badrunnisa High School in Paschimgaon. He completed his Intermediate of Arts from Feni College in 1929. Shamsul Huq earned his bachelor's in political economy and political philosophy from the Islamia College of Calcutta in 1931. He got his master's from the University of Calcutta in 1933. He also received training from the University of London from 1945 to 1946, under the Post-War Education Reforms Programme.

== Career ==
Shamsul Huq served as the third vice-chancellor of the University of Rajshahi from 31 August 1965 to 4 August 1969. He then served the government of Pakistan under General Yahya Khan as a minister in the Ministry of Education, Science and Technology Research until the independence of Bangladesh.

From 23 September 1975 to 1 February 1976, Shamsul Huq served as the fifteenth vice-chancellor of the University of Dhaka. He became Bangladesh's fifth Minister of Foreign Affairs in November 1975, serving this role until March 1982. From 1977 to 1978, Shamsul Huq was a member of the president of Bangladesh's advisory board. Along with President Ziaur Rahman, he contributed to the formulation of the formation of the South Asian Association for Regional Cooperation (SAARC) in 1980.

== Works ==
- Charging Education in England (1948)
- Compulsory Education in Pakistan (1954)
- Education and Development Strategy in South and South East Asia (1965)
- Pakistan's New Education Policy (1970)
- Education Manpower and Development in South and South East Asia (1976)
- "The Patterns of Education in South and South East Asia" in Encyclopædia Britannica (New Edition)
- "Education in German Encyclopedia" Lexikon der Pedagogi (Verlag Herder)
- Higher Education and Employment in Bangladesh (co-author, 1983)
- South Asia Regional Co-operation: Its Underlying Concept, Problems and Promises in Future of South Asia (1985)
- Role of Education in Development based on lectures delivered at the Bangla Academy (1987)
- Bangladesh in International Politics: the Dilemmas of the Weak States (1993)
- Aid, Development and Diplomacy (2001)
- Bissho-rajniti o Bangladesh (2001)
- Bikasman Somaj o Shikhka (1987)
