= Laksam Upazila =

Laksam লাকসাম
- Upazila
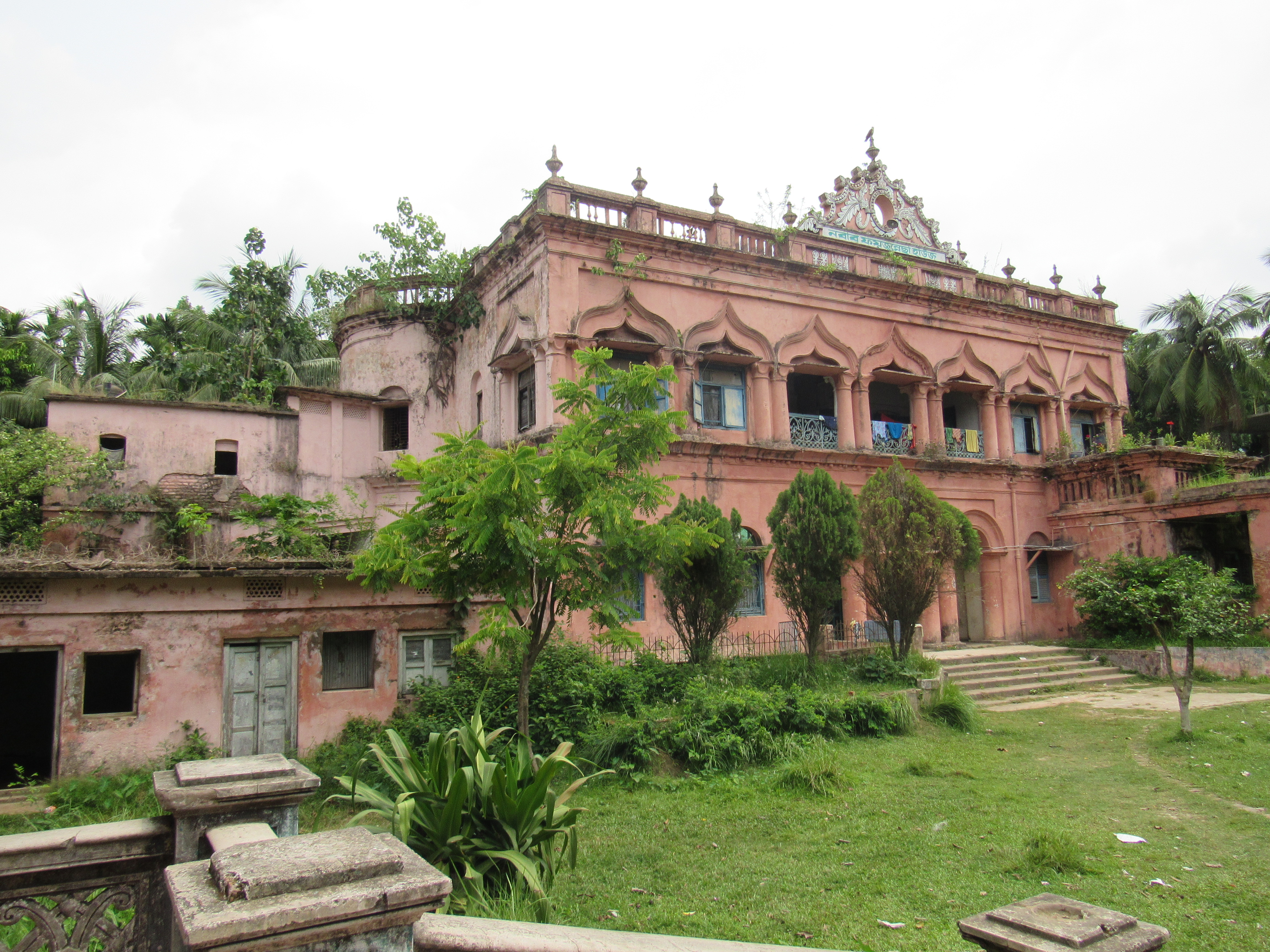
- Zamindar Bari of Nawab Faizunnesa in Laksam

- Coordinates: 23°14.8′N 91°7.7′E
- Country: Bangladesh
- Division: Chittagong
- District: Comilla
- Headquarters: Laksam

Area
  - Total: 141.74 km^{2} (54.73 sq mi)

Population (2022)
  - Total: 333,729
  - Density: 2,354.5/km^{2} (6,098.2/sq mi)
- Time zone: UTC+6 (BST)
- Postal code: 3570
- Area code: 08032
- Website: laksam.comilla.gov.bd

Laksam Upazila mauza geocode map

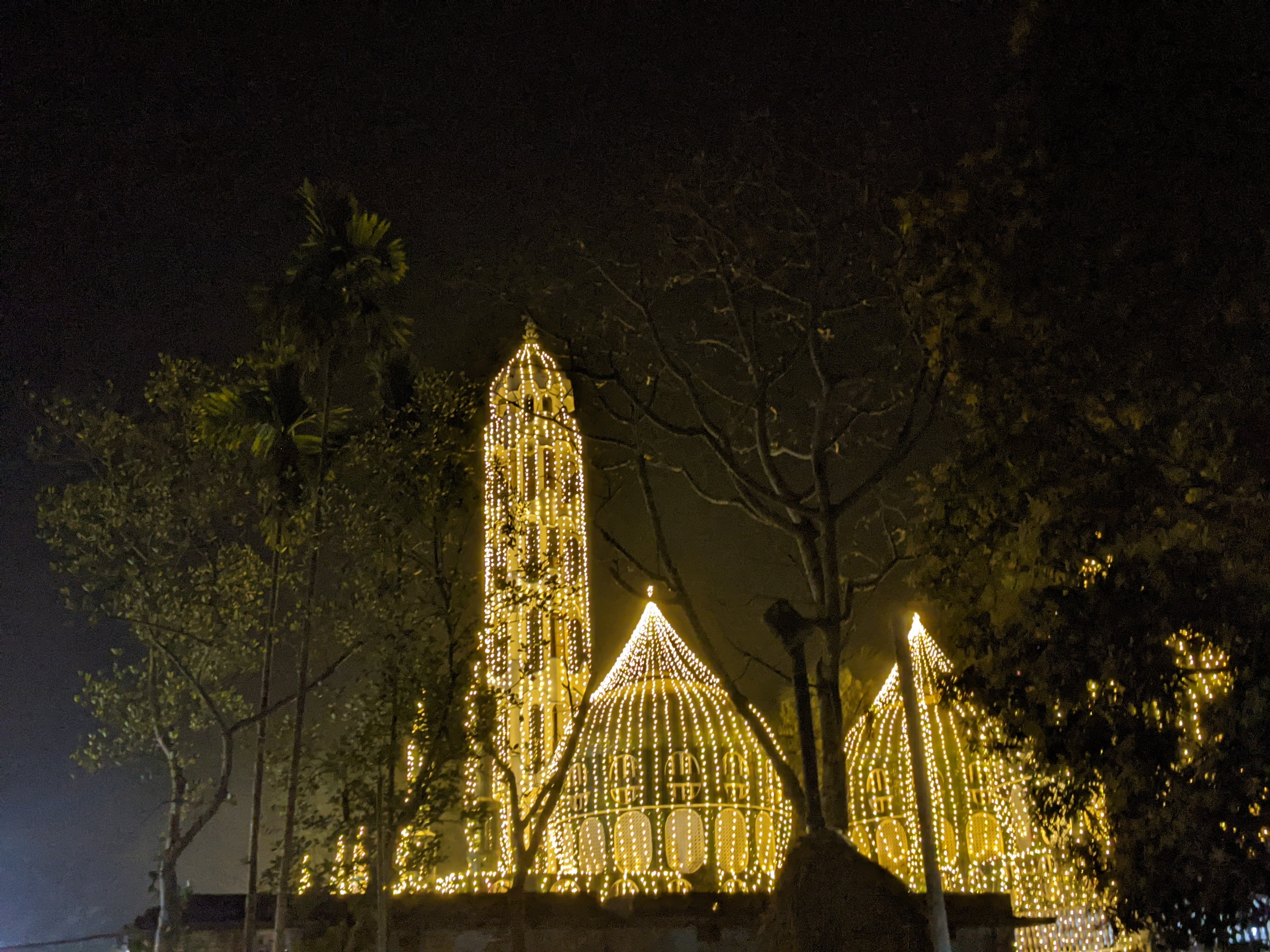
কালিয়াপুর দরবার শরীফ

Laksam (Bengali: লাকসাম) is an upazila of Comilla District in the division of Chittagong, Bangladesh. This upazila is located just 29 kilometers south of Cumilla City, on the banks of the transboundary Dakatia River. Laksam is known as the birthplace of Nawab Faizunnesa Chowdhurani.

== History ==
Laksam was made into an upazila in 1983. On 6 April 1971, more than 200 people were killed by Pakistani army at Azgora Bazar during the Bangladesh Liberation war. The Pakistan army was defeated on 12 December 1971 in the upazila. During the course of the war, 17 freedom fighters died along with numerous Pakistani soldiers. The upazila has experienced a water crisis due to arsenic in the groundwater.

== Geography ==
Laksam Upazila has an area of 141.74 km^{2} (54.73 sq mi). It is bounded by Comilla Sadar South on the northeast, and Barura on northwest, and Nangalkot on Southeast, and Monoharganj upazila on the southwest, and Shahrasti upazila of Chandpur District on the west.

== Rivers and canals ==
- Dakatia
- Curzon Canal

== Demographics ==
Religions in Laksam Upazila (2022)
Religion	Percent
Islam	95.01%
Hinduism	4.48%
Buddhism	0.50%
Other or not stated	0.01%

According to the 2022 Bangladeshi census, Laksam Upazila had 74,781 households and a population of 333,729. 10.92% of the population were under 5 years of age. Laksam had a literacy rate (age 7 and over) of 77.34%: 77.81% for males and 76.92% for females, and a sex ratio of 90.72 males for every 100 females. 103,573 (31.04%) lived in urban areas.

According to the 2011 Census of Bangladesh, the residual Laksam Upazila had 57,119 households and a population of 275,646. 71,047 (25.77%) were under 10 years of age. Laksam had a literacy rate (age 7 and over) of 81.18%, compared to the national average of 51.8%, and a sex ratio of 1092 females per 1000 males. 70,632 (25.62%) lived in urban areas.

In the residual Laksam Upazila, Muslims were 260,501, Hindus 13,448 and Buddhists 1,597.

=== Fruits and crops ===
Main fruits include jackfruit, litchi, mango, carambola. Main crops include paddy, wheat, potato, seasonal vegetables.

== Places of interest ==
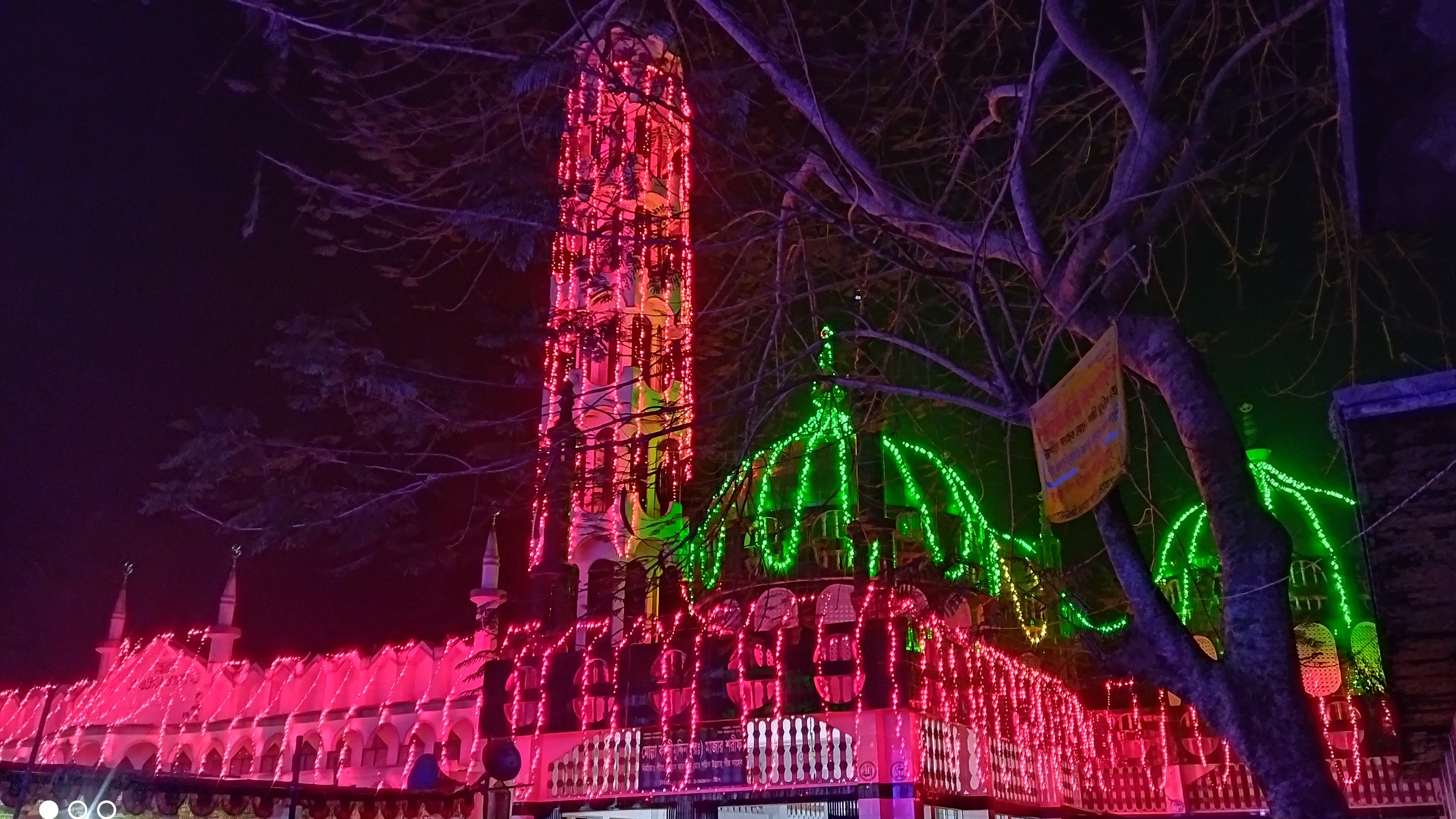
Kaliapur Darbar Sharif

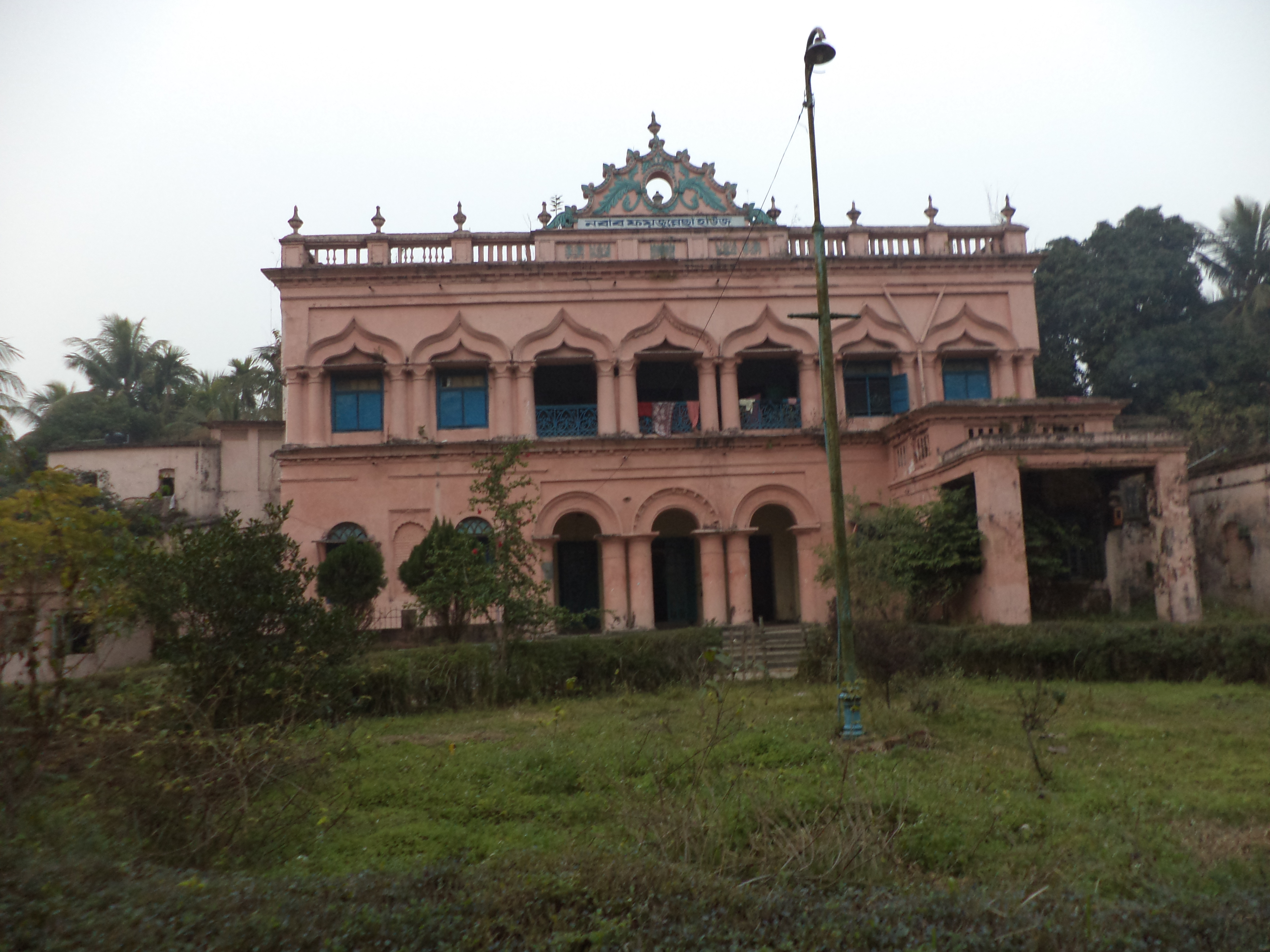
Paschimgaon Nawab bari

- Kaliapur Darbar Sharif
- 3 domed Kazir Mosque;
- 10 domed Nawab Bari Mosque;
- Paschimgaon Nawab Bari;
- 3 domed Afrannesa Mosque (1869);
- Atulchandra Zamindar Bari;
- Sree Sree Jagannath Bari Devalaya;
- Jagannath Pond.
- Laksam Junction Lake

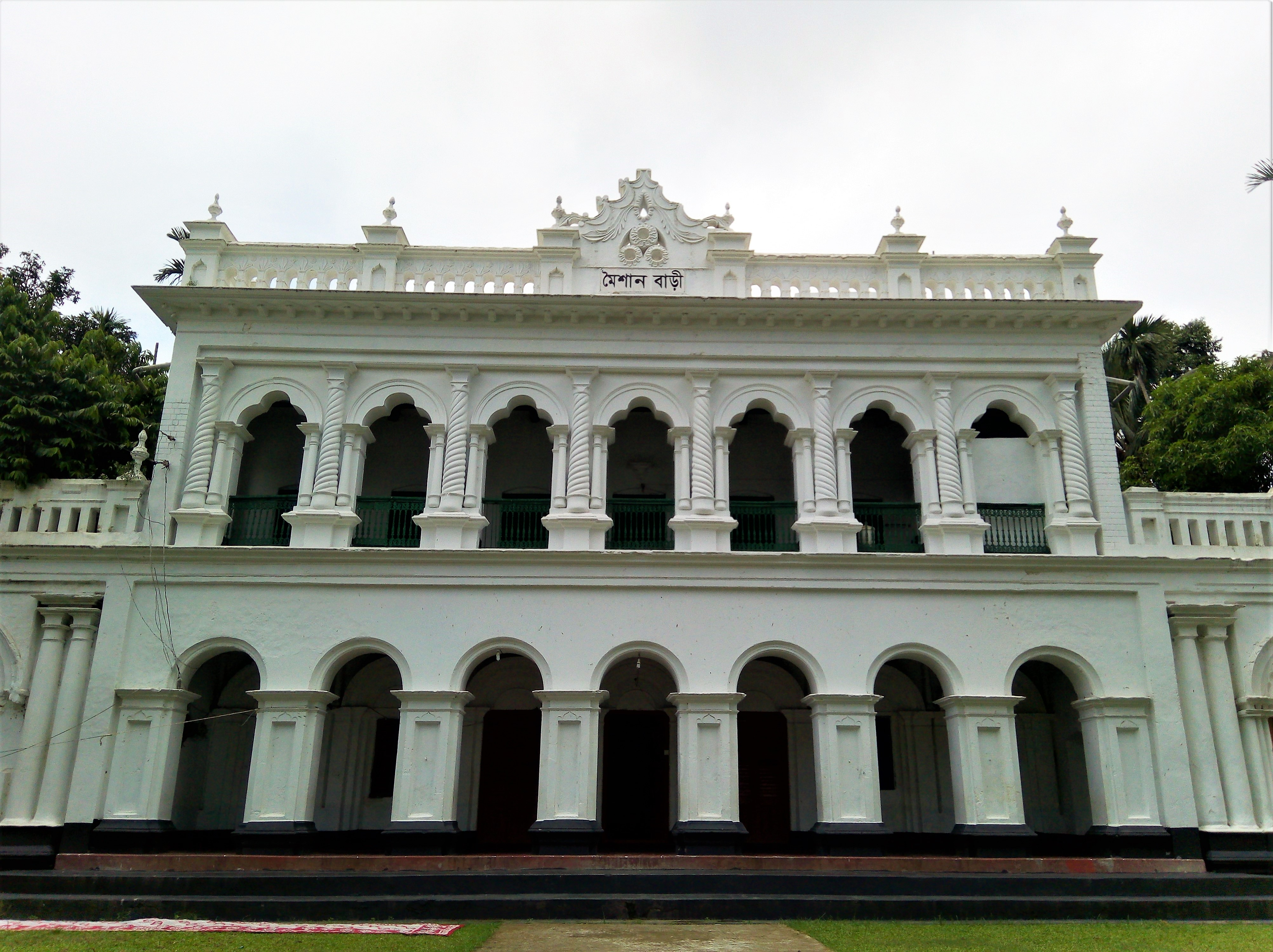
Laksham Moishan Bari

== Sports ==
- 1st Division Football League
- Volleyball League is held every year
- Inter-union football competition and Inter-school various sports competitions

== Administration ==
Laksham Upazila is divided into Laksham Municipality and eight union councils: Azgora, Bakoi, Gobindapur, Laksam East, Kandirpar, Mudafargonj North, Mudafargonj South and Uttarda. The union councils are subdivided into 136 mauzas and 178 villages.

Laksham Municipality is subdivided into 9 wards and 31 mahallas.

== Transport ==
Laksam Railway Junction, on the Akhaura-Laksam-Chittagong Line, Laksam-Noakhali Line and Laksam-Chandpur Line is one of the biggest junctions of Bangladesh. From here people go to Chandpur District and Noakhali District.

=== Extinct mediums of transport ===
Motor launch, bullock drawn cart, palanquin, horse drawn carriage.

== Education ==
There are six colleges in the upazila. They include Baraigaon Pali Pariven College and Nurul Amin Mazuder Degree College. Nawab Faizunnesa Government College, founded in 1943, is the only honors level one.

According to Banglapedia, Laksam Government Pilot High School and Laksham Pilot Girls High School are notable secondary schools.

The madrasa education system includes five fazil and one kamil madrasa.

== Media ==
Weekly Laksam, Weekly Laksam Barta, Weekly Alor Dishari, Weekly Somoyer Dorpon, Weekly Naxi Barta, Weekly Joy Kantha, Daily Torun Kantho.

== Notable residents ==
- Jalal Ahmed, member of parliament, represented greater Laksam.
- Biplob Bhattacharjee, goalkeeper of the national football team, attended Laksam Government Pilot High School.
- Nawab Faizunnesa, philanthropist and social worker, was born in Paschim Gaon in 1834.
- Muhammad Shamsul Haque, foreign minister of Bangladesh (1978–1982), was born in Paschim Gaon in 1912.
- Md. Tazul Islam, member of parliament and government minister, represented Manoharganj and Laksam upazilas.
- Hifzur Rahman, Islamic scholar, was born in Uttar Fenua in 1958.
