= Bakerganj =

Bakerganj বাকেরগঞ্জ
- Town and Municipality
- Location in Bangladesh
- Coordinates: 22°32′20″N 90°20′20″E
- Country: Bangladesh
- Division: Barisal Division
- District: Barisal District
- Upazila: Bakerganj Upazila

Government
  - Type: Municipality
  - Body: Bakerganj Municipality

Area
  - Total: 6.25 km^{2} (2.41 sq mi)

Population (2011)
  - Total: 29,890
  - Density: 4,780/km^{2} (12,400/sq mi)
- Time zone: UTC+6 (BST)

Bakerganj (Bengali: বাকেরগঞ্জ) is a town in Barisal District, Barisal Division, Bangladesh.
