= Hajiganj =

Hajiganj হাজীগঞ্জ
- Town and Municipality
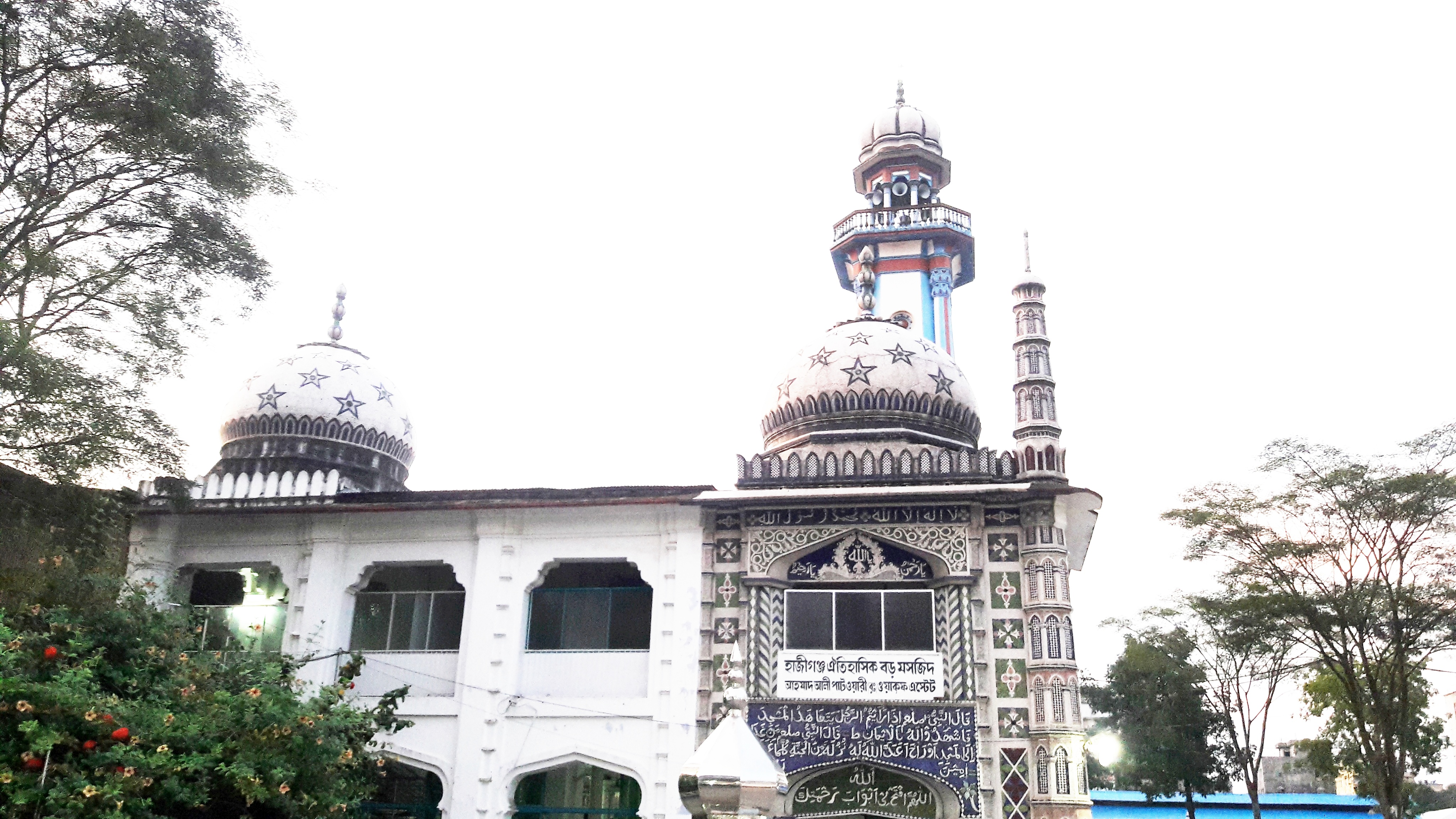
- Hajiganj Boro Masjid

- Location of Hajiganj town in Chittagong division Location of Hajiganj town in Bangladesh
- Coordinates: 23.251°N 90.850°E
- Country: Bangladesh
- Division: Chittagong
- District: Chandpur
- Upazila: Haziganj

Government
  - Type: Municipality
  - Body: Hajiganj Municipality

Population (2022)
  - Total: 79,482
- Time zone: UTC+6 (BST)
- National calling code: +880

Hajiganj Municipality mahallah geocode map

Hajiganj is a town in eastern Bangladesh. It is the headquarters of the Haziganj upazila of Chandpur District. It is located on the banks of the Dakatia River.

The chief executive officer of Hajiganj is Md. Rashedul Islam.

== Demographics ==
Religions in Hajiganj (2011)
Religion	Percent
Islam	89.65%
Hinduism	10.34%
Other or not stated	0.01%

According to the 2022 Bangladesh census, Hajiganj city had a population of 79,482 and a literacy rate of 84.71%.

According to the 2011 Bangladesh census, Hajiganj city had 12,679 households and a population of 63,892. 14,762 (23.10%) were under 10 years of age. Hajiganj had a literacy rate (age 7 and over) of 66.18%, compared to the national average of 51.8%, and a sex ratio of 1013 females per 1000 males.

== Economy ==
Hajiganj Handicrafts is an artisan business established locally in 1988, which specialises in the sustainable production of woven baskets. Since 2023 the business has partnered with the charity Oxfam UK.
