= A R Shamsud Doha =

Bangladeshi politician

Aminur Rahman Shamsud Doha (24 January 1929 – 3 March 2012) was a Bangladeshi politician and former foreign minister of Bangladesh.

== Early life ==
Shamsud Doha was born on 24 January 1929 in Murshidabad District, West Bengal, British India. His father was A. H. M. Shamsud Doha, Inspector General of Police (Pakistan) and Central Minister of Agriculture and Works (Pakistan). He graduated from St. Xavier's Collegiate School and St. Paul's School, Darjeeling. In 1948, he graduated from the University of Calcutta.

== Career ==
Shamsud Doha joined Pakistan Army in 1950 and retired from service in 1968.

Shamsud Doha contested in the 1970 election as a candidate of Awami League from Rawalpindi. He founded Inter Wing newspaper and was sent to jail three times for criticizing the government in his newspaper.

He was minister of foreign affairs from 1982 to 1984. He previously served as ambassador to Yugoslavia, Iran and the United Kingdom, and was minister for information. He was awarded the Yugoslavia Order of the Flag. He founded Dialogue Publications in Dhaka.

== Personal life ==
Shamsud Doha had two sons, Shahid and Naseer Doha. His brother in law was Syed Muhammad Idrees, also Inspector General of Police (Pakistan).

== Death ==
Shamsud Doha died on 3 March 2012 in Lebanon where he had been residing.

Political offices
Preceded by Muhammad Shamsul Haque	Minister of Foreign Affairs; 1982-1984	Succeeded by Humayun Rashid Choudhury
