= Nawab Faizunnesa =

Zamindar in present-day Comilla District, Bangladesh (1834–1903)

Faizunnesa Choudhurani বেগম ফয়জুন্নেসা চৌধুরানী
- Nawab
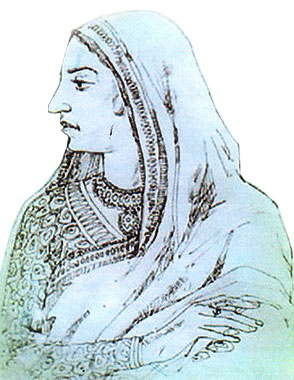
- Nawab Faizunnesa

Zamindar of Homnabad-Pashchimgaon
- Reign: 1883–1903
- Predecessor: Ahmed Ali Chowdhury
- Successor: Mohamed Ali Chowdhury
- Born: 1834; Tipperah, Bengal Presidency, British India (today Comilla District, Bangladesh)
- Died: 1903 (aged 68–69); Laksam, Tipperah, Bengal Presidency, British India
- Burial: Laksam, Chittagong Division, Bangladesh
- Spouse: Muhammad Gazi
- Issue: Arshad-un-Nissa Choudhurani; Badr-un-Nissa Choudhurani
Names
- Begum Faiz-un-Nissa Choudhurani
- House: House of Tughlaq (by birth) House of Timur (by birth)
- Father: Ahmed Ali Chowdhury alias Shahzada Mirza Aurangazeb
- Mother: Begum Araf-un-Nissa Choudhurani

Nawab Begum Faizunnesa Choudhurani (Bengali: নওয়াব বেগম ফয়জুন্নেসা চৌধুরানী; 1834–1903) was Zamindar of Homnabad-Pashchimgaon Estate in present-day Comilla District, Bangladesh. She is most famous for her campaign for female education and other social issues. In appreciation of her social work, in 1889 Queen Victoria awarded Faizunnesa the title of "Nawab", making her the first female Nawab in South Asia.

Faizunnesa's educational and literary work belonged to the post-1857 era when Muslims in India started having the full thrust of colonial acrimony and were at the nadir of deprivation and discrimination. Faizunnesa embarked on establishing schools for women in that cultural context. Metaphorically, she sought to rescue the community from the menace of despair and pessimism by portraying a Muslim hero in Rupjalal and thus gave them hope and confidence.

An advocate of female education, a philanthropist and social worker, Faizunnesa was born in Comilla in what is now Bangladesh. She was married to a distant cousin and neighbouring zamindar, Muhammad Gazi, in 1860 as his second wife only to be separated after mothering two daughters, Arshadunnesa and Badrunnesa. She became a zamindar after her mother's death in 1883 and became increasingly involved in social and charitable work, and thus in 1889 earned the honour of being the first woman Nawab of British India. She penned few other literary pieces such as Sangeet Saar, Sangeet Lahari and Tattwa O Jatiya Sangeet, and is renowned for her pioneering educational and charitable work and establishing of schools, madrasas and hospitals. However, Rupjalal has remained her most important work and attracted more research and critical attention.

== Birth and background ==
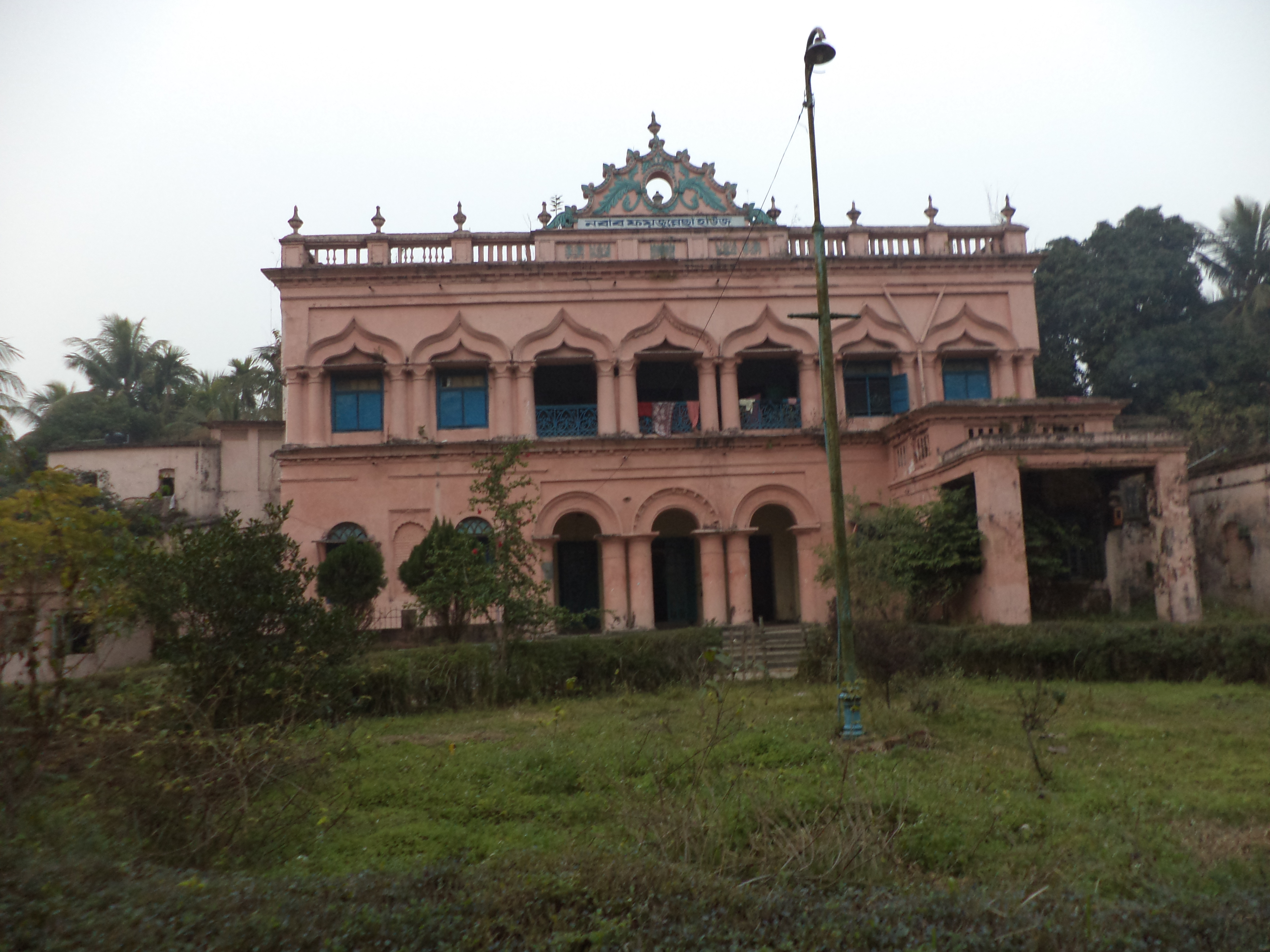
Kurshed Munzil, the palace of the Pashchimgaon Nawab Family

Begum Faizunnesa Chowdhurani was born in 1834 to an aristocratic Bengali Muslim family in the village of Pashchimgaon under Laksam in the Tipperah District of the Bengal Presidency. She was the eldest daughter of Khan Bahadur Ahmed Ali Chowdhury (Shahzada Mirza Aurangzeb), the Nawab of Homnabad-Pashchimgaon, and Arfannessa Chowdhurani Saheba. Her mother was notable for constructing the Pashchimgaon Nawab Bari Mosque in 1864.

Her paternal family is descended from a paternal niece of Bahadur Shah I who was married to Amir Mirza Abdul Aziz of Banu Abbas. Under the emperor's instructions, Abdul Aziz sent his son, Amir Mirza Jahandar Khan (Agowan Khan), with thousands of soldiers to quell a rebellion in Tipperah. After stopping the rebellion, Jahandar Khan returned to Delhi but left his son, Amir Mirza Humayun Khan in Bengal. Mirza Humayun Khan (Bahroz Khan, Bhuru Khan) was made the Jagirdar of a territory named after him as Humayunabad, which later got corrupted to Homnabad, and was succeeded by his son, Amir Mirza Masum Khan. The Homnabad Nawab dynasty was thus established, with the family settling in the village of Mahichal. They later relocated to Pashchimgaon after Masum Khan's son Amir Mirza Motahar Khan married off his son Amir Mirza Sultan Khan (Gora Ghazi Chowdhury) to Syeda Bhanu Bibi, the daughter of Khuda Bakhsh Ghazi (the zamindar of Pashchimgaon and descendant of Ghazi Saheda). Faizunnesa's maternal grandfather, Muhammad Asjad Chowdhury, was the son of Muhammad Amjad Chowdhury (Dengu Mia), the zamindar of Sharshadi in Feni.

== Early life and marriage ==
Faizunnesa was raised in a conservative Muslim family, where the women would maintain a strict purdah system. She received no formal education but she educated herself in her library during leisure time. She was proficient in Arabic, Persian, Sanskrit and Bengali language.

In 1860, Chowdhurani was married to a distant cousin and neighbouring Zamindar, Muhammad Gazi, becoming his second wife. But the couple became separated and Faizunnesa returned to live with her paternal family again.

== Career and philanthropy ==
After her mother's death in 1883, Faizunnesa inherited her property and became zamindar of Pashchimgaon. She became increasingly involved in social work after becoming zamindar. In 1873, Faizunnesa Choudhurani established a high school for girls in Comilla, which is one of the earliest female schools privately established in Indian subcontinent, which is now called Nawab Faizunnesa Government Girls' High School. She also founded a school at Pashchimgaon that was later upgraded to a college and now named as Nawab Faizunnesa Degree College. In 1893, Faizunnesa established a charitable dispensary in her village for women in purdah, particularly destitute women. She also built a hospital for women, Faizunnesa Zenana Hospital in Comilla. In addition, she built mosques and contributed towards the development of roads and ponds. Faizunnesa patronised different newspapers and periodicals, including Bandhab, Dhaka Prakash, Musalman Bandhu, Sudhakar, and Islam Pracharak. Before her death in 1903 she donated her entire property to the nation.

== Rupjalal ==
Originally written in Bangla, Nawab Faizunnesa's (1834–1903) Rupjajal was published from Dhaka in 1876. Fayeza S. Hasanat's translation into English of the long-neglected semi-autobiographical allegory with an introduction and commentary has for the first time secured a place for Faizunnesa and for her work among the global readership. Previously, perhaps, the only notable mention Faizunnesa had in any significant research work was in Sonia Nishat Amin's The World of Muslim Women in Colonial Bengal, 1876–1939 (Brill, 1996) that regards Rupjalal's publication year as a significant marker in the history of Bengali Muslim women's literary practice, and the founding of Lady Brabourne College in 1939 as the culmination of Muslim women's education, since that was the first time it had government support during the colonial period.

Although Amin regards Faizunnesa as the first significant modern Muslim woman writer of former Bengal, it is still early to make a definitive assumption in this regard. New research is unearthing more and more past Bengali Muslim women writers. Now we know about Rahimunnessa of the eighteenth century whose poetry manuscript was first discovered in 1955, about Rahima and Zamirunnessa from Chittagong who the literary historians believe wrote in the first half of the nineteenth century. These three still remain largely obscure, and probably for this reason Taherunnesa is commonly known as the earliest Bengali Muslim woman writer whose 'Bamagoner Rachana' (Writing by Women) appeared in Bamabodhini Patrika in 1865. However, since she is known to have appeared in the magazine just once along with her article and since we do not know much about her life except that she attended Boda School for Girls, early history of Bengali Muslim women's writing generally starts from Nawab Faizunnesa, information about whose life and work is available. The only Bengali Muslim woman litterateur who has so far received comparatively a greater amount of research attention is Begum Rokeya Sakhawat Hossain (1880–1932), and that with certain amount of disbelief and amazement as she is presumed to stand out alone without any significant predecessors or successors to form a continuous literary tradition of Bengali Muslim women. Between Faizunnesa and Rokeya, there were few more: Latifunnesa, whose ‘Bangiya Musalman Lekhikader Prati’ (To the Bengali Muslim Women Writers) was published in Bamabodhini Patrika in 1897, and Azizunnesa, the first known Muslim woman to have been published in a Muslim-run magazine, Islam Pracharak, as her poem ‘Hamd Orthat Ishwar Stuti’ (In Praise of God) was published in it in 1902.

Rupjalal is a story of prince Jalal and two heroines, Rupbanu and Hurbanu. It narrates Jalal's heroic and sexual exploits and his marriages to both the heroines. Hasanat reads Rupjalal “as a manifesto of Muslim women’s sexual defiance and subordination in nineteenth century Bengal” (p. 2). However, the text can also be read as a counter narrative to the discourse of nineteenth-century Western literary orientalism that tends to emasculate Muslim men and represents Muslim women as always in the lookout for a gaze at Western Christian heroes only to sexually offer themselves to their supposed dream-lovers. Contrary to the image of emasculated Muslim man, Faizunnesa depicts an 'athletic and strong' Muslim hero of virility and valor who "grew so handsome at sixteen / That wherever he went, women were seen / Flocking around him; his manliness / Turned the meekest housewives into temptresses / And each of these women longed to be the one / To be loved by this handsome man!" (50) As opposed to orientalist representations, in Rupjalal it is a Muslim hero who is at the centre of Muslim women's imagination.

Hasanat introduced Faizunnesa's work to a global readership through her translation.

== See also ==
- Zamindars of Bengal
- Begum Rokeya
- Islamic feminism
