= Golapganj Municipality =

Municipality in Sylhet Division, Bangladesh

Golapganj Municipality গোলাপগঞ্জ পৌরসভা
- Municipality
- Golapganj Pourashava
- Interactive map of Golapganj Municipality
- Coordinates: 24.8583°N 92.0208°E
- Country: Bangladesh
- Division: Sylhet Division
- District: Sylhet District
- Upazila: Golapganj Upazila
- Established: May 10, 2001

Government
  - Type: Mayor–council government
  - Mayor: Vacant

Area
  - Land: 17.28 km^{2} (6.67 sq mi)

Population
  - Total: 40,000 (approx.)
- Website: Official website

Golapganj Municipality mahallah geocode map

Golapganj Pourashava (Bengali: গোলাপগঞ্জ পৌরসভা, romanized: Golapganj Pourashava) is a municipality of Golapganj Upazila in Sylhet, Bangladesh.

== Demographics ==
The area of the municipality is 17.28 square kilometers. The total population is 40,000 (approx.). Among them are 16,624 males and 17,327 females.

== Government ==
The municipality is led by a mayor. As of November 2024, the current mayor's position is Vacant. Aminul Islam Rabel served as mayor till 2024

== Villages ==
There are 20 villages in the municipality consisting of 9 wards.

- Phulbari purbapara
- Phulbari Uttarpara
- Chitafulbari
- Gaushgaon (partial)
- Kamargaon
- Sarashati
- Daripaton
- Nijganj
- Tikarbari
- Ghogarkul purbapara
- Ghogarkul Pashchimpara
- Rankeli uttarpara
- Rankeli Dighirpar
- Rankeli Nurupara
- Rankeli Yagul
- Rankeli Nayatul
- Rankeli dhakkinbag
- Upar barocot (Part)
- Bade Rankeli
- Rankeli Nayagram

== Newspapers and periodicals ==
- G Voice24
