= Patharghata Municipality =

Municipality in Barisal, Bangladesh

Patharghata Municipality পাথরঘাটা পৌরসভা
- Municipality

Area
  - Total: 12.95 km^{2} (5.00 sq mi)

Population
  - Total: 18,929

Patharghata Municipality mahallah geocode map

Patharghata Municipality (Bengali: পাথরঘাটা পৌরসভা, lit. 'Patharghata Municipality') is a municipality in Patharghata, Barguna, Barisal, Bangladesh.

== History ==
Patharghata Municipality was established on 31 May 1990 by the government of Hussain Muhammad Ershad.

Patharghata Municipality began administrative activities in 1991.

== Administration ==
The municipality has 9 wards and ranked B class.
