= Ramgarh, Khagrachhari =

Ramgarh রামগড়
- Municipality
- Interactive map of Ramgarh
- Coordinates: 22°59′57″N 91°44′04″E
- Country: Bangladesh
- Division: Chittagong Division
- District: Khagrachhari District
- Upazila: Ramgarh Upazila

Government
  - Mayor: vacant

Area
  - Total: 20.87 km^{2} (8.06 sq mi)

Population (2022)
  - Total: 28,205
  - Density: 1,351/km^{2} (3,500/sq mi)
- Time zone: UTC+6 (BST)
- Postal code: 4440
- Website: ramgarh.khagrachhari.gov.bd/en

Ramgarh is a town of Khagrachhari District in Chittagong Hill Tracts, Bangladesh.

== Demography ==
According to 2022 census, total population of the town are 28,205. Among them, 20,829 are Muslim, 4,793 are Hindu, 2,296 are Buddhist and 287 are others.

Religion in Ramgarh town-2022
1. Islam (73.8%)
2. Hinduism (17.0%)
3. Buddhism (8.14%)
4. Others (1.02%)

== Ethnic groups ==
Ramgarh is home to 24,675 Bengalis, 1,937 Marma, 1,363 Tripura and 187 others people.

Ethnicity in Ramgarh town (2022)
1. Bengali (87.6%)
2. Marma (6.87%)
3. Tripura (4.83%)
4. Others (0.66%)
