= Matiranga, Khagrachhari =

Matiranga মাটিরাঙ্গা
- Municipality
- Interactive map of Matiranga
- Coordinates: 23°02′30″N 91°52′23″E
- Country: Bangladesh
- Division: Chittagong Division
- District: Khagrachhari District
- Upazila: Matiranga Upazila

Government
  - Mayor: vacant

Area
  - Total: 25.5 km^{2} (9.8 sq mi)

Population (2022)
  - Total: 29,322
  - Density: 1,150/km^{2} (2,980/sq mi)
- Time zone: UTC+6 (BST)
- Postal code: 4450
- Website: matiranga.khagrachhari.gov.bd/en

Matiranga is a town of Khagrachhari District in Chittagong Hill Tracts, Bangladesh.

== Demography ==
According to 2022 census, total population of the town are 29,322. Among them, 25,326 are Muslim, 2,351 are Hindu, 1,509 are Buddhist and 101 are others.

Religion in Matiranga town-2022
1. Islam (86.4%)
2. Hinduism (8.02%)
3. Buddhism (5.15%)
4. Others (0.46%)

== Ethnic Group ==
Matiranga is home to 26,863 Bengalis, 1,232 Tripura 922 Chakma, 297 Marma and 187 others people.

Ethnicity in Matiranga town (2022)
1. Bengali (91.6%)
2. Tripura (4.20%)
3. Chakma (3.14%)
4. Marma (1.01%)
5. Others (0.66%)
