= Minister of Foreign Affairs (Bangladesh) =

Head of the Ministry of Foreign Affairs of the Government of Bangladesh

- বাংলাদেশের পররাষ্ট্রমন্ত্রী
- Government Seal of Bangladesh

- Flag of Bangladesh

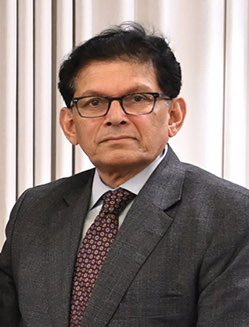
- Incumbent; Khalilur Rahman since 17 February 2026
- Ministry of Foreign Affairs
- Style: The Honourable (formal); His Excellency (diplomatic)
- Type: Cabinet minister
- Member of: Cabinet; Advisory Council; Parliament; National Committee on Security Affairs
- Reports to: Prime Minister
- Seat: Bangladesh Secretariat
- Nominator: Prime Minister
- Appointer: President; on the advice of the Prime Minister
- Term length: Prime Minister's pleasure
- Constituting instrument: Constitution of Bangladesh
- Inaugural holder: Khondaker Mostaq Ahmad
- Formation: 14 April 1971; 55 years ago
- Deputy: Shama Obaed; Humaiun Kobir
- Salary: ৳245000 (US$2,000) per month (incl. allowances)
- Website: mofa.gov.bd

The Minister of Foreign Affairs (Bengali: পররাষ্ট্রমন্ত্রী; Pororashtro Montri; or simply the foreign minister) is the head of the Ministry of Foreign Affairs of the Government of the People's Republic of Bangladesh. Khalilur Rahman, who was the National Security Advisor of Bangladesh under Chief Adviser Muhammad Yunus, currently serves as the 24th Foreign Minister of Bangladesh.

== Ministers ==
Caretaker Adviser

Portrait	Minister (Birth-Death) Constituency	Term of office			Political party	Ministry	Prime Minister
Portrait	Minister (Birth-Death) Constituency	From	To	Period	Political party	Ministry	Prime Minister
	Khondaker Mostaq Ahmad খন্দকার মোশতাক আহমেদ (1918–1996)	14 April 1971	1 December 1971	231 days	Awami League	Mujib I	Tajuddin Ahmad
	Abdus Samad Azad আবদুস সামাদ আজাদ (1922–2005)	1 December 1971	16 March 1973	1 year, 105 days	Awami League	Mujib I	Tajuddin Ahmad
	Kamal Hossain কামাল হোসেন (born 1937)	16 March 1973	15 August 1975	2 years, 152 days	Awami League	Mujib II	Sheikh Mujibur Rahman
	Kamal Hossain কামাল হোসেন (born 1937)	16 March 1973	15 August 1975	2 years, 152 days	Awami League	Mujib III	Sheikh Mujibur Rahman
	Kamal Hossain কামাল হোসেন (born 1937)	16 March 1973	15 August 1975	2 years, 152 days	Awami League	Mujib IV	Muhammad Mansur Ali
	Abu Sayeed Chowdhury আবু সাঈদ চৌধুরী (1921–1987)	15 August 1975	6 November 1975	83 days	Awami League	Mostaq	Vacant
	Muhammad Shamsul Huq মুহাম্মদ শামসুল হক (1912–1986)	November 1975	24 March 1982	6 years, 143 days	Bangladesh Nationalist Party	Ziaur	Shah Azizur Rahman
	A R Shamsud Doha এ আর শামসুদ দোহা (1929–2012)	24 March 1982	June 1984	2 years, 98 days	Jatiya Party (Ershad)	Ershad	Ataur Rahman Khan
	Humayun Rashid Choudhury হুমায়ুন রশিদ চৌধুরী (1928–2001)	28 July 1984	10 December 1988	4 years, 192 days	Jatiya Party (Ershad)	Ershad	Ataur Rahman Khan
	Anisul Islam Mahmud আনিসুল ইসলাম মাহমুদ (born 1947); MP for Chittagong-5	11 December 1988	6 December 1990	5 years, 158 days	Jatiya Party (Ershad)	Ershad	Kazi Zafar Ahmed
	Fakhruddin Ahmed ফখরুদ্দিন আহমেদ (born 1940) (Adviser)	9 December 1990	15 March 1991	96 days	Independent	Shahabuddin	Shahabuddin Ahmed
	A. S. M. Mustafizur Rahman এ. এস. এম. মুস্তাফিজুর রহমান (1934–1996); MP for Bagerhat-2	20 March 1991	30 March 1996	5 years, 10 days	Bangladesh Nationalist Party	Khaleda I	Khaleda Zia
	A. S. M. Mustafizur Rahman এ. এস. এম. মুস্তাফিজুর রহমান (1934–1996); MP for Bagerhat-2	20 March 1991	30 March 1996	5 years, 10 days	Bangladesh Nationalist Party	Khaleda II	Khaleda Zia
	Muhammad Habibur Rahman মুহাম্মদ হাবিবুর রহমান (1928–2010) (Chief Adviser)	31 March 1996	23 June 1996	84 days	Independent	Habibur	Self
	Abdus Samad Azad আব্দুস সামাদ আজাদ (1922–2005); MP for Sunamganj-3	23 June 1996	15 July 2001	5 years, 22 days	Awami League	Hasina I	Sheikh Hasina
	Justice (Retd); Latifur Rahman বিচারপতি (অবসরপ্রাপ্ত) লতিফুর রহমান (1936–2017) (Chief Adviser)	15 July 2001	10 October 2001	87 days	Independent	Latifur	Self
	A. Q. M. Badruddoza Chowdhury এ.কিউ.এম. বদরুদ্দোজা চৌধুরী (1930–2014); MP for Munshiganj-1	10 October 2001	14 November 2001	35 days	Bangladesh Nationalist Party	Khaleda III	Khaleda Zia
	Morshed Khan মোরশেদ খান (born 1940); MP for Chittagong-10	14 November 2001	29 October 2006	4 years, 349 days	Bangladesh Nationalist Party	Khaleda III	Khaleda Zia
	Iajuddin Ahmed ইয়াজউদ্দিন আহমেদ (1931–2012) (President and Chief Adviser)	29 October 2006	11 January 2007	74 days	Independent	Iajuddin	Self
	Iftekhar Ahmed Chowdhury ইফতেখার আহমেদ চৌধুরী (born 1946) (Adviser)	11 January 2007	30 January 2009	2 years, 19 days	Independent	Fakhruddin	Fakhruddin Ahmed
	Dipu Moni দীপু মনি (born 1965); MP for Chandpur-2	30 January 2009	20 November 2013	4 years, 294 days	Awami League	Hasina II	Sheikh Hasina
	Abul Hassan Mahmood Ali আবুল হাসান মাহমুদ আলী (1943–2025); MP for Dinajpur-4	20 November 2013	7 January 2019	5 years, 48 days	Awami League	Hasina II	Sheikh Hasina
	Abul Hassan Mahmood Ali আবুল হাসান মাহমুদ আলী (1943–2025); MP for Dinajpur-4	20 November 2013	7 January 2019	5 years, 48 days	Awami League	Hasina III	Sheikh Hasina
	A. K. Abdul Momen এ. কে. আব্দুল মোমেন (born 1947); MP for Sylhet-1	7 January 2019	10 January 2024	5 years, 3 days	Awami League	Hasina IV	Sheikh Hasina
	Hasan Mahmud হাছান মাহমুদ (born 1963); MP for Chittagong-7	11 January 2024	5 August 2024	207 days	Awami League	Hasina V	Sheikh Hasina
	Md. Touhid Hossain মোহাম্মদ তৌহিদ হোসেন (born 1955) (Adviser)	8 August 2024	17 February 2026	1 year, 193 days	Independent	Yunus	Muhammad Yunus
	Khalilur Rahman খলিলুর রহমান (born 1954)	17 February 2026	Incumbent	242 days	Independent	Tarique	Tarique Rahman

== See also ==
- Constitution of Bangladesh
- President of Bangladesh
- Prime Minister of Bangladesh
- Politics of Bangladesh
