= Laksam =

Laksam লাকসাম
- Town and Municipality
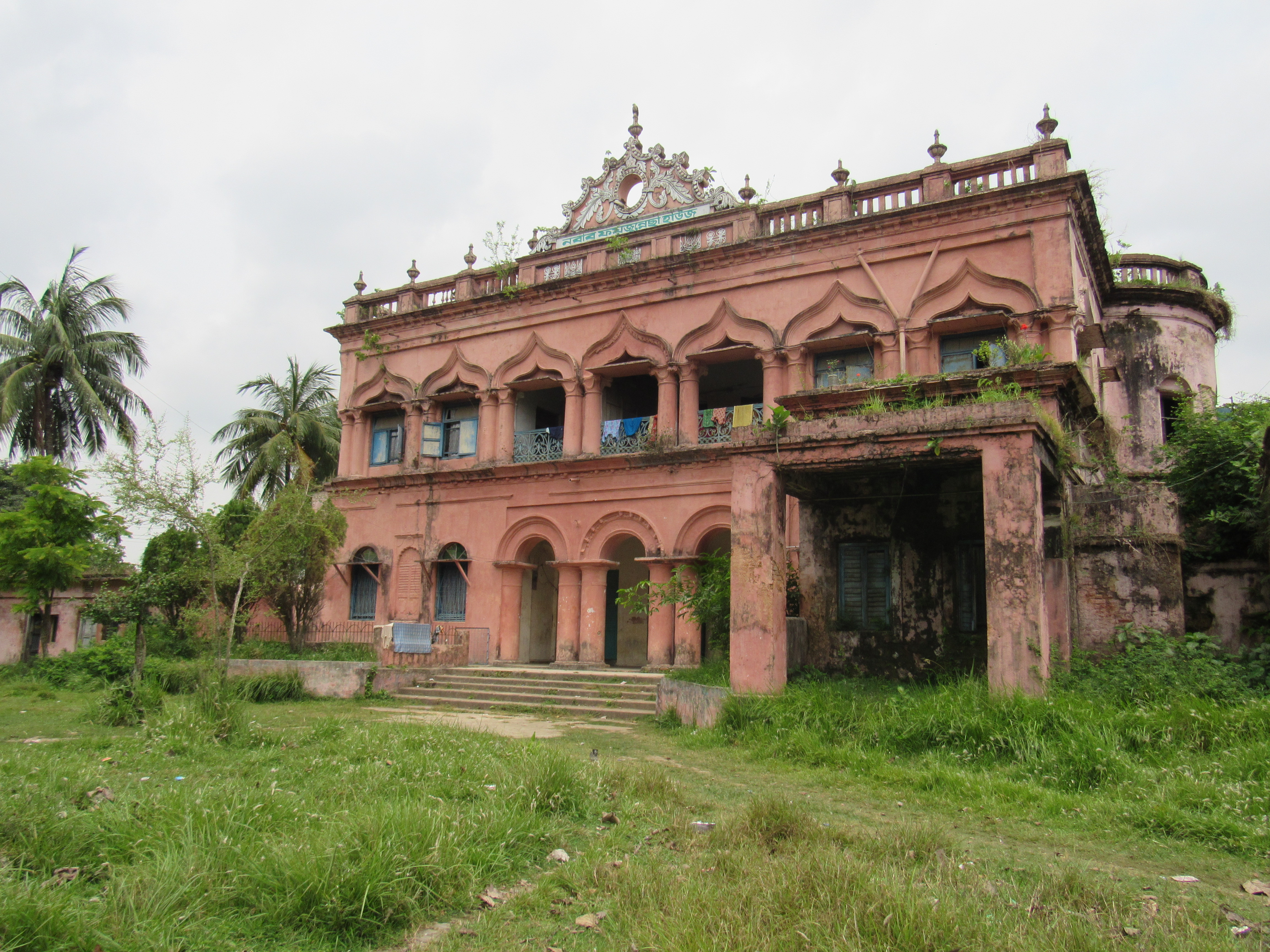
- House of Nawab Faizunnesa

- Location in Chittagong division Location in Bangladesh
- Coordinates: 23.240°N 91.119°E
- Country: Bangladesh
- Division: Chittagong
- District: Comilla
- Upazila: Laksam

Government
  - Type: Municipality
  - Body: Laksam Paurashava
  - Paura Mayor: Md. Abul Khayer

Area
  - Total: 19.86 km^{2} (7.67 sq mi)

Population (2022)
  - Total: 95,087
  - Density: 4,788/km^{2} (12,400/sq mi)
- Time zone: UTC+6 (BST)
- Postal code: 3570

Laksam Municipality mahallah geocode map

Laksam is a city in eastern Bangladesh. It is the headquarters of Laksam Upazila of Comilla District. It is situated on the banks of the Dakatia River.

== Demographics ==
Religions in Laksam (2011)
| Religion | Percent |
| Islam | 90.83% |
| Hinduism | 9.05% |
| Other or not stated | 0.12% |

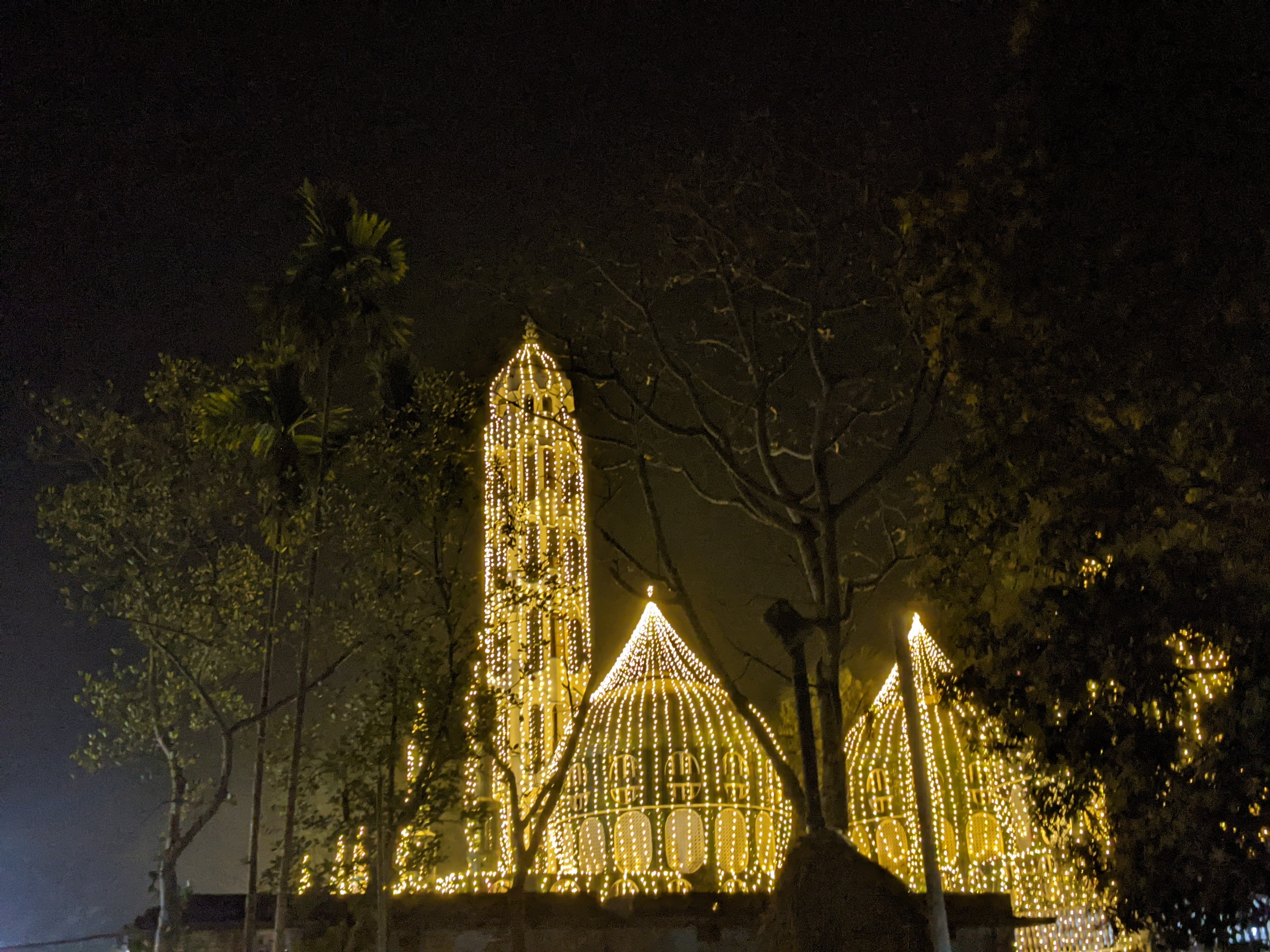
কালিয়াপুর দরবার শরীফ

According to the 2022 Bangladesh census, Laksam city had a population of 95,087 and a literacy rate of 82.32%.

According to the 2011 Bangladesh census, Laksam city had 14,079 households and a population of 70,632. 16,820 (23.81%) were under 10 years of age. Laksam had a literacy rate (age 7 and over) of 60.31%, compared to the national average of 51.8%, and a sex ratio of 1014 females per 1000 males.
