= Gournadi Municipality =

Municipality in Bangladesh

Coordinates: 22°58′24″N 90°13′51″E

Gournadi Municipality গৌরনদী
- Municipality
- Interactive map of Gournadi Municipality

Area
  - Total: 11 km^{2} (4.2 sq mi)

Gournadi (Bengali: গৌরনদী, lit. 'Gaurnadi') is a municipality in Barisal, Bangladesh.

== History ==
Gournadi Municipality was established on 26 December 1996.

== Administration ==
Gournadi has 9 wards and 1 thana, Gaurnadi Model Thana.
