= Nawab Faizunnesa Government College =

Government college at Laksam, Comilla, Bangladesh

Nawab Faizunnesa Govt. College
- নবাব ফয়জুন্নেছা সরকারী কলেজ
- Other name: Faizunnesa College
- Motto: পড় তোমার প্রতিপালকের নামে
- Motto in English: Read in the name of your Lord
- Type: Government college
- Established: 1943
- Founder: Nawab Faizunnesa
- Students: 5000+
- Location: Paschimgaon, Laksam Upazila, Comilla District, Bangladesh; 23.2291°N 91.1130°E
- Campus: Urban
- Website: nfgc.edu.bd

Nawab Faizunnesa Government College (NFGC) is a government college in Laksam Upazila, Bangladesh.

== History ==
The institution was founded by Nawab Begum Faizunnesa Chowdhury in 1873 as a madrasa. It became a higher secondary madrasa in 1920, and an Islamic intermediate college in 1943. It became Nawab Faizunnesa Degree College in 1964, and was nationalized on 1 May 1982.

== Academics ==
At present its number of students is more than 5 thousand.

=== Courses and faculties ===
==== The college has honors courses in seven subjects ====
1. English
2. Economics
3. Political science
4. Accounting
5. Management
6. Mathematics
7. Zoology

==== In addition to higher secondary and degree (pass) in ====
1. Science
2. Humanities
3. Business education

==== Bachelor's ====
- B.A.
- B.S.S.
- B.S.C.
- B.B.S.

== Alumni ==
- Md. Tajul Islam (born 1955) – politician
