= Betagi Municipality =

Municipality in Barisal, Bangladesh

Coordinates: 22°24′51″N 90°09′56″E

Betagi Municipality বেতাগী পৌরসভা
- Municipality
- Interactive map of Betagi Municipality
- Country: Bangladesh

Area
  - Total: 7.72 km^{2} (2.98 sq mi)

Population
  - Total: 12,786
- Website: betagimunicipality.gov.bd

Betagi Municipality mahallah geocode map

Betagi Municipality (Bengali: বেতাগী পৌরসভা, lit. 'Betagi Municipality') is a municipality in Betagi, Barguna, Barisal, Bangladesh.

== History ==
On 18 March 1999, Betagi Municipality was established.

On 18 August 2024, the office of Betagi Municipality was vandalized and attacked.
