= Sandwip Municipality =

Municipality in Sandwip, Chittagong, Bangladesh

Sandwip Municipality সন্দ্বীপ পৌরসভা
- Municipality
- Interactive map of Sandwip Municipality
- Coordinates: 22.4998°N 91.4531°E
- Country: Bangladesh

Sandwip Municipality mahallah geocode map

Sandwip Municipality (Bengali: সন্দ্বীপ পৌরসভা, lit. 'Sandwip Municipality') is a municipality in Sandwip Upazila, Chittagong District, Bangladesh.

== History ==
Sandwip Municipality was established in 1999.
