= Daulatkhan =

Town and municipality in Barisal Division

Daulatkhan দৌলতখান
- Town and Municipality
- Location in Bangladesh
- Coordinates: 22°36′00″N 90°44′50″E
- Country: Bangladesh
- Division: Barisal Division
- District: Bhola District
- Upazila: Daulatkhan Upazila

Government
  - Type: Municipality
  - Body: Daulatkhan Municipality

Area
  - Total: 10.1 km^{2} (3.9 sq mi)

Population (2011)
  - Total: 27,514
  - Density: 2,720/km^{2} (7,060/sq mi)
- Time zone: UTC+6 (BST)

Daulatkhan (Bengali: দৌলতখান) is a town in Bhola District in Barisal Division, Bangladesh. It is the administrative headquarters and urban centre of Daulatkhan Upazila.
