= Haziganj Upazila =

Hajiganj হাজীগঞ্জ
- Upazila
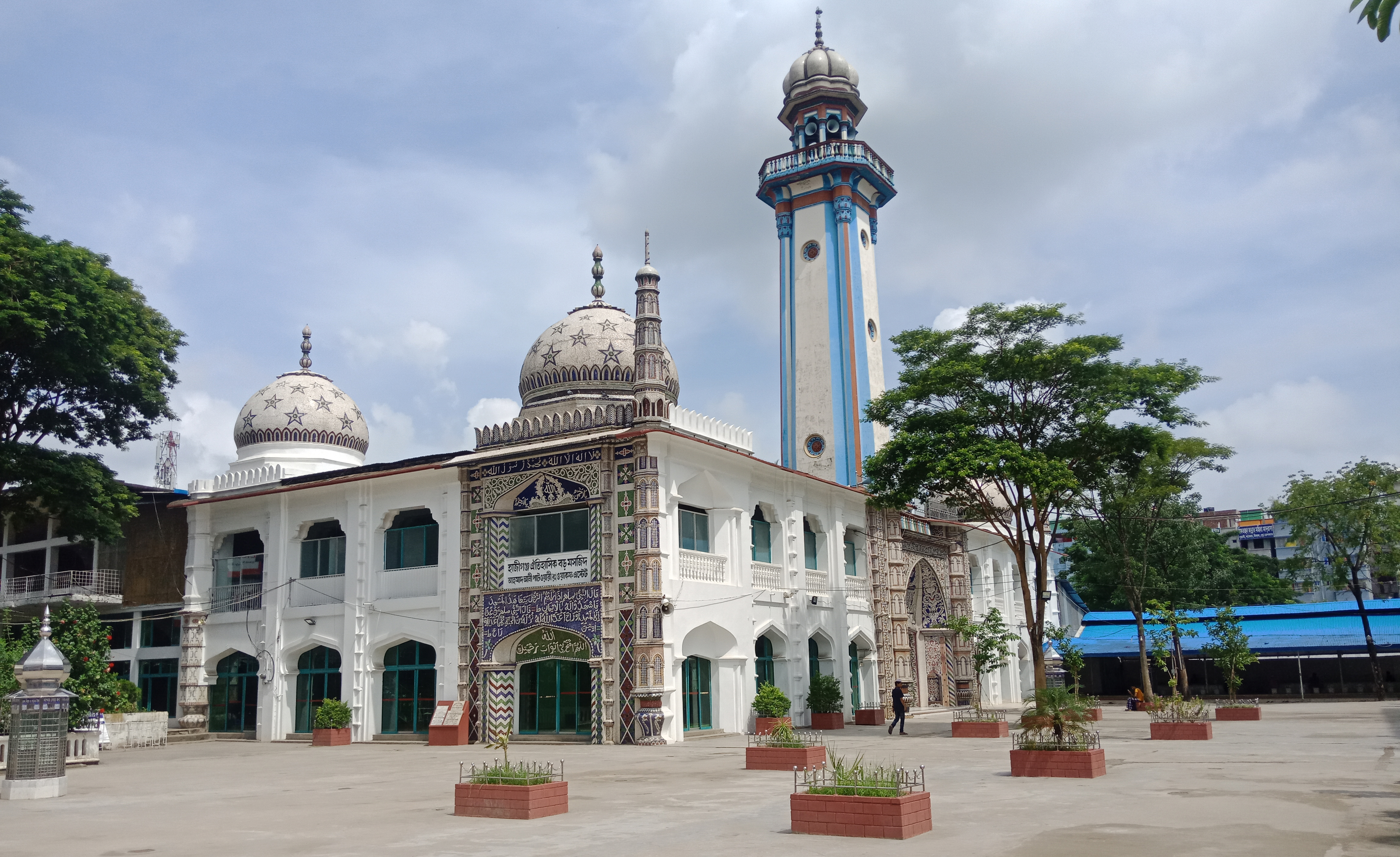
- Hajiganj Boro Masjid

- Coordinates: 23°15′N 90°51′E
- Country: Bangladesh
- Division: Chittagong
- District: Chandpur
- Headquarters: Hajiganj

Area
  - Total: 189.9 km^{2} (73.3 sq mi)

Population (2022)
  - Total: 360,367
  - Density: 1,898/km^{2} (4,915/sq mi)
- Time zone: UTC+6 (BST)
- Postal code: 3610
- Area code: 08424
- Website: hajiganj.chandpur.gov.bd

Haziganj (Bengali: হাজীগঞ্জ) or Hajiganj is an upazila of Chandpur District in Chittagong Division, Bangladesh.

== Geography ==
Haziganj is located at 23.2500°N 90.8500°E. Hajiganj upazila (Chandpur district) has a total area of 189.90 km^{2}, located in between 23°12' and 23°20' north latitudes and in between 90°45' and 90°55' east longitudes. It is bounded by Kachua and Matlab Dakshin upazilas on the north, Faridganj and Ramganj upazilas on the south, Shahrasti upazila on the east, Matlab Dakshin and Chandpur Sadar upazilas on the west.

== Demographics ==
Religions in Hajiganj Upazila (2022)
Religion	Percent
Islam	94.17%
Hinduism	5.82%
Other or not stated	0.01%

According to the 2022 Bangladeshi census, Hajiganj Upazila had 84,061 households and a population of 360,367. 10.70% of the population were under 5 years of age. Hajiganj had a literacy rate (age 7 and over) of 80.46%: 80.17% for males and 80.71% for females, and a sex ratio of 86.57 males for every 100 females. 102,304 (28.39%) lived in urban areas.

According to the 2011 Census of Bangladesh, Hajiganj Upazila had 65,697 households and a population of 330,477. 79,699 (24.12%) were under 10 years of age. Hajiganj had a literacy rate (age 7 and over) of 60.59%, compared to the national average of 51.8%, and a sex ratio of 1106 females per 1000 males. 69,434 (21.01%) lived in urban areas.

== Economy ==
Main exports are Jute, Jute made products.

== Administration ==
Haziganj Upazila is divided into Haziganj Municipality and 12 union parishads: Bakila (Dakshin Rajargaon), Dakshin Gandharbapur, Dakshin Kalocho, Hajiganj, Hatila Paschim, Hatila Purba, Paschim Barkur, Purba Barkur, Uttar Gandharabpur, Uttar Kalocho, Uttar Rajgaon and Daddoshgram Union. The union parishads are subdivided into 120 mauzas and 149 villages.

Haziganj Municipality is subdivided into 12 wards and 18 mahallas.

== Infrastructure ==
There are 49 clinics, 1 diabetic hospital, 1 eye hospital, 9 private hospitals, 8 government union medical facilities.

== Religious Center ==
Great Mosque of Hajiganj is a historical mosque at Chandpur. The first choice of many leisure travelers is the various archeological and ancient traditional installations. Haziganj Bara Masjid is a significant sight for these people. Hajiganj Bara Masjid is located in the middle of Hajiganj Bazar in Chandpur district upazila. Hajiganj is one of the largest mosques in the subcontinent.

== See also ==
- Upazilas of Bangladesh
- Districts of Bangladesh
- Divisions of Bangladesh
- Administrative geography of Bangladesh
