= Birgonj National Park =

National park of Bangladesh

- IUCN category IV (habitat/species management area)
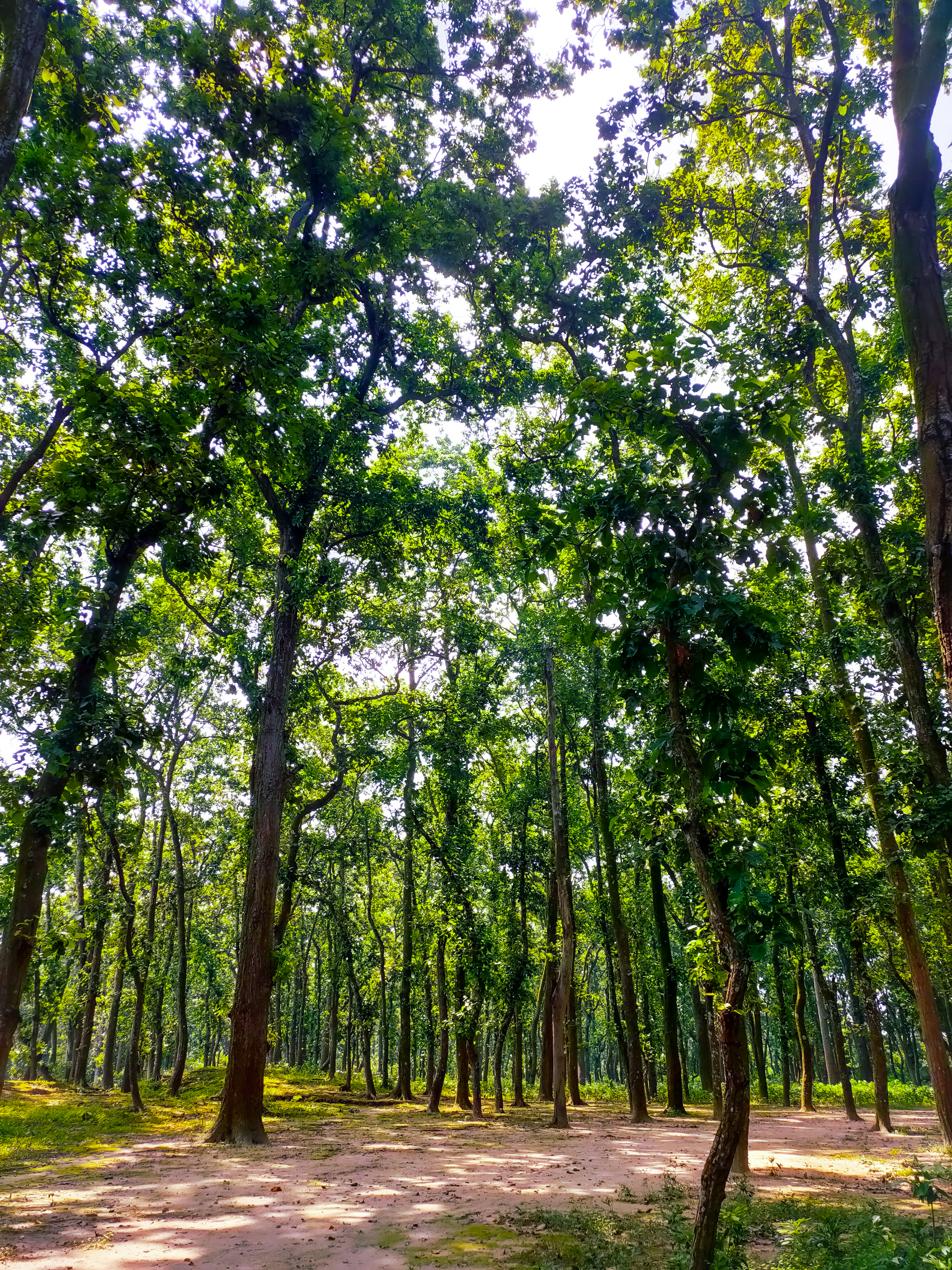
- Interactive map of Birgonj National Park
- Location: Dinajpur, Bangladesh
- Coordinates: 25.849129°N 88.662552°E
- Area: 168.56 ha (417 acres)
- Established: 14 December 2011; 14 years ago

Birgonj National Park (Bengali: বীরগঞ্জ জাতীয় উদ্যান) is an IUCN Category IV national park and nature reserve in Bangladesh. The park is located at Birganj Upazila in Dinajpur near the Dhaka-Rangpur Highway. It is under the jurisdiction of Birgonj forest beat, Thakurgaon Forest Range of Bangladesh Forest Department.

The park was officially declared as a national park by the government of Bangladesh on 14 December 201. Dominated by sal trees, the forest covers an area of 168.56 ha (417 acres).
