= History of Rangpur =

The Rangpur region predominantly includes the northern Bangladeshi districts of Rangpur, Dinajpur, Panchagarh, Gaibandha, Kurigram, Thakurgaon, Lalmonirhat and Nilphamari. Since 2010, Rangpur City has been the headquarters of the Rangpur Division of Bangladesh.

== Etymology ==
The name Rangpur comes from the word Rango Pur(রঙ্গপুর). The word Ranggo means charm, happiness and Pur means a place, area. So the word Ranggopur means The city of Happiness There was a king in Kamrup Empire. His name was Bhagadatta. He built a Ranggamahal by the side of the river named Ghagat. Ranggamahal means the ancient kings of Bengal area spent their time by enjoying dance or some kind of other recreation. From then, the place was known Ranggapur. And in the flow of time it has changed to Rangpur.

== Mughal Empire ==
Man Singh I, a military commander of Emperor Akbar, conquered parts of Rangpur in 1575. Rangpur came completely under the Mughal empire in 1686. Mughalbasa and Mughalhat of Kurigram District still bear marks of the Mughal rule in the region. The Mughals made a Criminal Headquarter in Rangpur. Northern parts of Rangpur were made a part of the Sarkar of Pinjarah, and southern Rangpur was a part of the Ghoraghat Sarkar.

== British Period ==
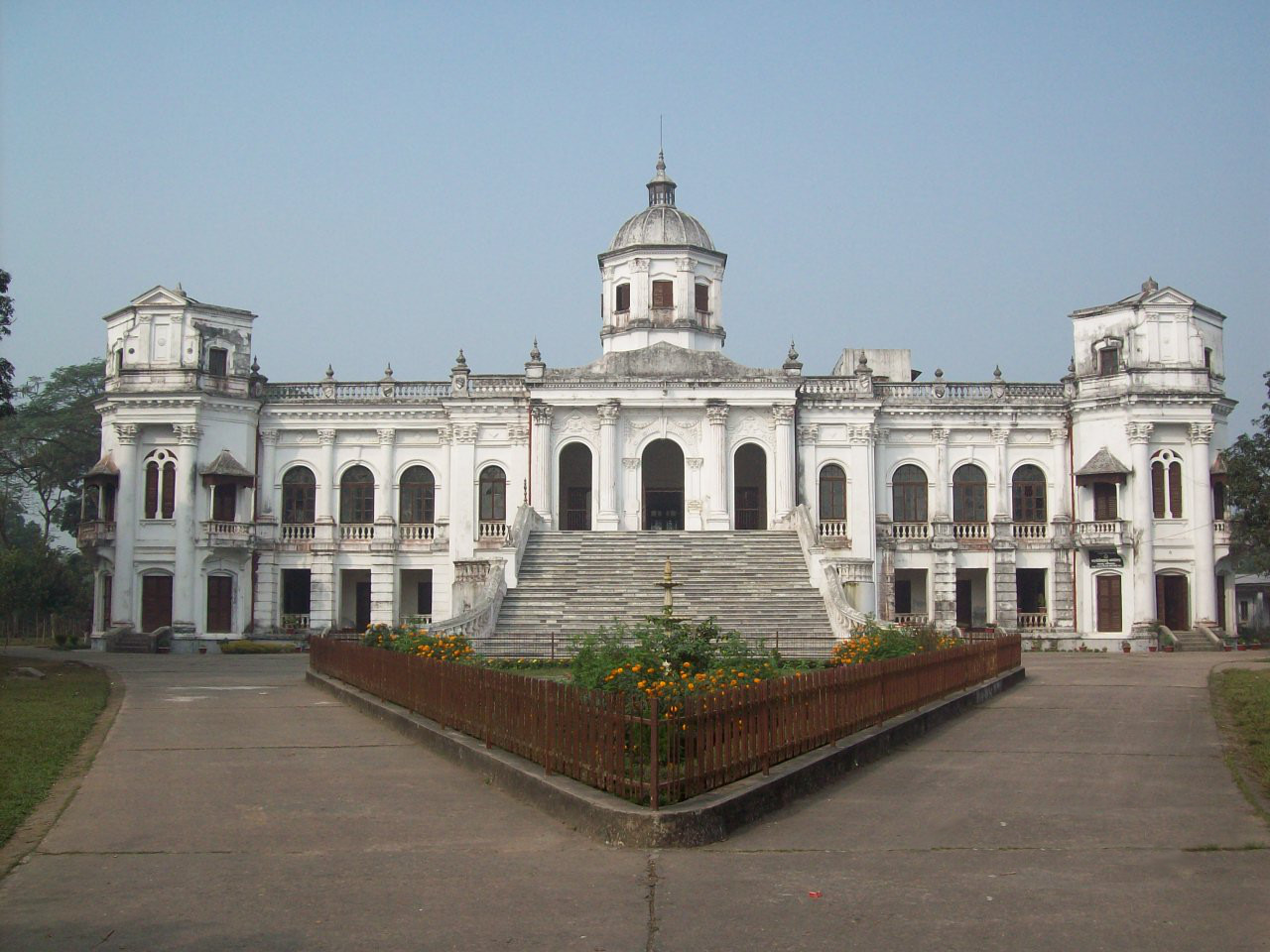
Tajhat Palace was built by Maharaja Kumar Gopal Lal Roy in the beginning of the 20th century

After several rulers, finally Rangpur came under British East India company in 1765. Rangpur was declared a district headquarters on December 16, 1769, and established as a municipality in 1869, making it one of the oldest municipalities in Bangladesh. The municipal office building was erected in 1892 under the precedence Raja Janaki Ballav, Senior Chairman of the municipality. In 1890, the Shyamasundari canal was excavated for the improvement of the town.

Movements against British rulers started here in 1930. During British colonial rule, they created several educational institutions. Rangpur Zilla School, Carmichael College etc. During the early period of the company rule, the Fakir-Sannyasi rebellion and other peasant rebellions were held in Rangpur.

== Pre Independence Period (1947-1971) ==
During that period, several institution were founded. Rangpur Medical College was started its journey in 1970. Munaim Khan selected the area of this college in 1969.

== Post Independence Period (1947-now) ==
From a district of Rajshahi division, Rangpur became a division in 2010, and the Rangpur Municipality was turned into a City Corporation with Sharfuddin Ahmed Jhantu becoming its first mayor.
