= Mirkadim Municipality =

Municipality in Munshiganj, Bangladesh

Coordinates: 23.5710°N 90.4941°E

Mirkadim Municipality মিরকাদিম পৌরসভা
- Municipality
- Interactive map of Mirkadim Municipality

Mirkadim Municipality (Bengali: মিরকাদিম পৌরসভা, lit. 'Mirkadim Municipality') is a municipality in Munshiganj, Bangladesh.
