= Katiadi =

Municipality in Bangladesh

Katiadi Municipality কটিয়াদি পৌরসভা
- Municipality
- Interactive map of Katiadi Municipality

Area
  - Total: 17.50 km^{2} (6.76 sq mi)

Population
  - Total: 50,800

Katiadi Municipality mahallah geocode map

Katiadi Municipality (Bengali: কটিয়াদি পৌরসভা, lit. 'Katiadi Municipality') is a municipality in Katiadi, Dhaka, Bangladesh, it covers an area of 17.50 square kilometers.

== Administration ==
There are 9 wards and 21 mahallas under Katiadi and there are also 9 male councils and 3 female councils.

== Education ==
Katiadi has 2 degree colleges, 4 high schools, 10 government primary schools, 5 kindergartens, 1 textile institute.
