= Monohardi =

Municipality in Narsingdi, Bangladesh

Monohardi Municipality মনোহরদী পৌরসভা
- Municipality

Area
  - Total: 6.66 km^{2} (2.57 sq mi)

Population
  - Total: 20,717

Monohardi Municipality (Bengali: মনোহরদী পৌরসভা, lit. 'Monohardi Municipality') is a municipality in Monohardi, Narsingdi, Dhaka, Bangladesh.

== History ==
Monohardi Municipality was established on 16 June 2002.
