= Mundumala =

- Town and Municipality
- Interactive map of Mundumala
- Coordinates: 24.6081°N 88.4728°E
- Country: Bangladesh
- Division: Rajshahi Division
- District: Rajshahi District
- Upazila: Tanore Upazila

Area
  - Total: 10 km^{2} (3.9 sq mi)

Population (2011 census)
  - Total: 21,940
  - Density: 2,200/km^{2} (5,700/sq mi)
- Time zone: UTC+6 (BST)

Mundumala Municipality mahallah geocode map

Mundumala (Bengali: মুণ্ডুমালা) is a town and municipality in western Tanore Upazila, Rajshahi District, Bangladesh. The major village of Tanore is in Rajshahi Division.

== Geography ==
Mundumala's municipality is Old Badhar Union. It is bounded by Badhar Union to the north and north-east, Kolma Union to the east, Pakri to the south and Amnura to the west.

=== Rivers ===
There are no rivers in this municipality, but a large canal goes into it.

== Economy ==
Apart from the usual agricultural products of Bangladesh, such as rice, potatoes and lentils, Mundumala and its neighboring village are specially suited from various crops such as watermelons, sugarcane, mangoes and jackfruits. Main economical products in Mundumala is paddy. Before 1995, farmers cultivated one time in season but since then they cultivate three times a season.

== Points of interest ==
- Old Mosjid Mundumala Dokkhin para
- Big banyan tree In Mainpur.

== Administration ==
The town is governed by Mundumala municipality. Wards of Mundumala municipality are:

- Mundumala Ward
- Sadipur Ward
- Pachondor Ward
- Moinpur Ward
- Ayra Ward
- Jagdishpur, Talukpara, Tetna ward
- Kamalpur Ward
- Hasnapara Ward
- Chuniapara Ward

== Education ==
Mundumala Kamil Madrasah is another institution of Tanore Thana. Fazor Ali Molla College is another starting point of students. Mundumala is also an important educational center and termed as 'education village' of Tanore. Major educational institutes include:

- Mundumala Kamil Madrasah
- Moyenpur Alitola Dakhil Madrasah
- Mundumala Kawmi Madrasa
- Mundumala Dakhil Mohila Madrasa
- Mundumala Primary School
- Mundumala Govt. High School
- Mundumala Girls School
- Mundumala Kindergarten School
- Mundumala Mohila College
- Mundumala Fazor Ali Degree College
