= Maheshkhali =

Municipality in Chittagong, Bangladesh

Coordinates: 21°31′N 91°58′E

Maheshkhali Municipality মহেশখালী পৌরসভা
- Municipality
- Interactive map of Maheshkhali Municipality

Area
  - Total: 7.68 km^{2} (2.97 sq mi)

Population
  - Total: 35,000

Maheshkhali Municipality (Bengali: মহেশখালী পৌরসভা, lit. 'Maheshkhali Municipality') is a municipality in Maheshkhali, Cox's Bazar, Chittagong, Bangladesh.

== Geography ==
Maheshkhali municipality borders the Bay of Bengal in the north, south and west and Chakaria in the east.

== Education ==
Maheshkhali municipality consists of 3 government primary schools, 1 high school, 8 madrasahs and 2 colleges.

== Religion ==
Maheshkhali municipality consists of 16 mosques, 9 Hindu temples and 2 Buddhist sites.

== Healthcare ==
Maheshkhali municipality consists of 1 government hospital and several institutions.
