= Municipalities of Bangladesh =

Urban local government bodies in Bangladesh

Pourashovas of Bangladesh বাংলাদেশের পৌরসভা (Bengali)
- Also known as: Paurashava
- Category: Pourashova
- Location: Bangladesh
- Found in: Upazila / District
- Created: 1864
- Number: ~330 (as of mid-2020s)
- Government: Mayor – Council Government
- Subdivisions: Wards, Mahallas

Pourashovas of Bangladesh (Bengali: বাংলাদেশের পৌরসভা), officially known as Pourashova, are urban local government institutions in Bangladesh. They are established to govern towns and smaller urban centres or cities and function under the Local Government Division of the Ministry of Local Government, Rural Development and Co-operatives.

Municipalities are one of the principal forms of urban local government in Bangladesh. They serve urban areas that are smaller than those administered by City Corporations, while rural areas are governed by Union Parishads.

As of the mid-2020s, there are about 330 Pourashovas across the country, distributed among all 8 administrative Divisions. The number has changed over time as some municipalities have been upgraded to city corporations and new municipalities have been established.

== History ==
Pourashova (Municipal) governance in Bangladesh dates back to the British colonial period. The Bengal Municipal Act of 1864 introduced formal municipal institutions in urban areas of undivided Bengal, including major towns such as Dhaka, Chittagong, and Jessore.

After the partition of India in 1947, municipalities continued to function under East Pakistan administration. Following the independence of Bangladesh in 1971, the municipal system was retained and gradually reformed through various legal frameworks.

The current governing law is the Local Government (Pourashova) Act, 2009, which defines the structure, functions, and administrative responsibilities of municipalities in Bangladesh.

== Structure and administration ==
Each Pourashova is divided into wards and smaller neighborhoods called mahallas. Pourashova governance follows a Mayor – Council System:

- Mayor – Chief executive and elected head of the municipality
- Councillors – Elected representatives from wards
- Reserved women councillors – Representatives elected from reserved seats for women
- Chief Executive Officer (CEO) – Government-appointed administrative official

Elections are conducted by the Election Commission of Bangladesh for a five-year term.

== Formation criteria ==
Under the Local Government (Pourashova) Act, 2009, an area may be declared a Pourashova if it meets specific urban conditions:

- Majority of the population engaged in non-agricultural occupations
- At least one-third of land used for non-agricultural purposes
- Population density of approximately 2,000 persons per square kilometre or more
- Minimum population of around 50,000 residents

== Geography and distribution ==
A clickable map of Bangladesh exhibiting its divisions.

There are 330 municipalities in Bangladesh. Municipalities are distributed across all eight administrative divisions of Bangladesh and are typically centered around district and upazila headquarters.

| Division | Number of Pourashovas |
|---|---|
| Barishal | 26 |
| Chattogram | 64 |
| Dhaka | 63 |
| Khulna | 36 |
| Mymensingh | 28 |
| Rajshahi | 62 |
| Rangpur | 30 |
| Sylhet | 20 |
| Total | ~330 |

== Classification ==
Pourashovas are classified based on financial capacity and revenue generation:

- Class A – Large Pourashova with higher revenue and infrastructure development
- Class B – Medium-sized Pourashova
- Class C – Smaller or newly established Pourashova

== Functions ==
Pourashovas are responsible for providing civic services and maintaining urban infrastructure within their jurisdictions. Their functions include public health, sanitation, urban planning, infrastructure development, and the regulation of local commercial activities.

Among their principal responsibilities are:

- Supply of drinking water and maintenance of sanitation facilities
- Construction and maintenance of roads, bridges, culverts, footpaths, and street lighting
- Collection and disposal of solid waste, and maintenance of drainage systems
- Preparation and implementation of urban development and land-use plans
- Regulation and approval of building construction within municipal boundaries
- Registration of births and deaths and issuance of various civic certificates
- Issuance and renewal of trade licences and collection of municipal taxes, fees, and rates
- Management of public markets, bus terminals, slaughterhouses, parks, and other municipal properties
- Public health and environmental protection activities, including disease prevention and vector control
- Promotion of educational, cultural, recreational, and community welfare activities

Pourashovas may also undertake development projects relating to housing, environmental improvement, poverty alleviation, and local economic development, subject to the availability of financial and administrative resources.

== Digital services ==
The Government of Bangladesh operates an online service platform known as Pouraseba, which provides selected municipal services such as trade licenses, certificates, and other civic documents through a centralized system.

== Notable Pourashovas ==
Some notable municipalities include:

- Rangamati Pourashova – One of the largest municipalities by geographical area
- Jamalpur Pourashova – Major Class-A municipal center
- Dinajpur Pourashova – Historic urban municipality in northern Bangladesh
- Nabinagar Pourashova – One of the older municipalities in the country

== Urban evolution ==
With increasing urbanization, several municipalities have been upgraded to city corporations to improve administrative efficiency. These include:

- Gazipur City Corporation
- Narayanganj City Corporation
- Cumilla City Corporation
- Mymensingh City Corporation
- Bogra City Corporation

This reflects the ongoing transformation of urban governance in Bangladesh, driven by population growth and economic development.

== See also ==
- Local government in Bangladesh
- List of city corporations in Bangladesh
- List of Pourashovas in Bangladesh
- List of cities and towns in Bangladesh
- Administrative geography of Bangladesh
- Union Parishad
- Upazila
