= Dakatia River =

River in Bangladesh and India

Coordinates: 23.060760°N 91.289177°E

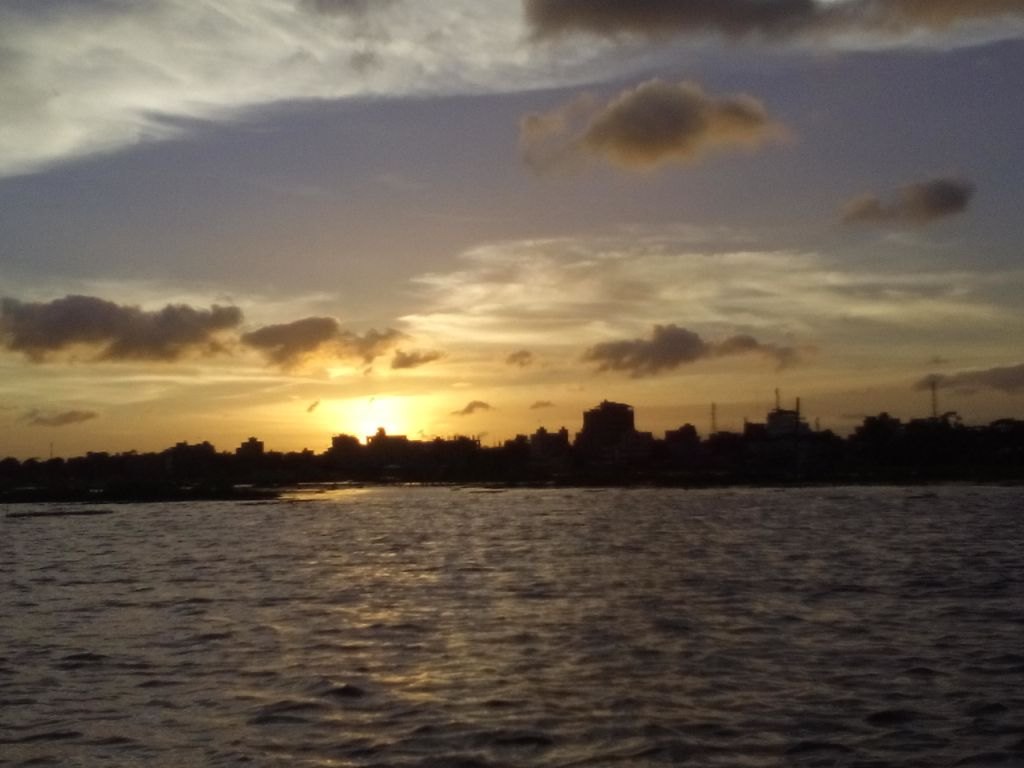

Location
- Countries: Bangladesh and India
- Division: Chattogram
- State: Tripura
- Districts: Cumilla; Chandpur; Sipahijala

Physical characteristics
- Source: Tripura
- Mouth: Meghna River
- Length: 141.2 km (87.7 mi)

The Dakatia is a river of Bangladesh and India. Its length is about 207 kilometres (129 mi). It enters Bangladesh from Tripura. After re-entering India from Cumilla District, it joins the Meghna River at Chandpur Boro Station molehead.

== Geography ==
The Dakatia is the first tributary that the Meghna receives after entering Noakhali. It combines several hill streams, including Sonaichari, Pagli Boaljar, and Kakri, originating from the Tippera Hills. After traveling about 6 miles in the south, it splits at latitude 230.21" and longitude 910.31 '. The left branch follows a sinuous course in the south until it meets little Feni River, while the right branch flows southwest and northwest up to Hajiganj, where Boaljuri river meets it on the right bank. Before taking an abrupt turn to the south about 15 miles further, the river throws off a channel, known as Chandpur Nullah that falls into the Meghna. The river follows a meandering course, dropping into the Meghna at Hazimara.

The Dakatia was formerly an important trade channel. It is still navigable in the lower region during the monsoon. The upper region is navigable throughout the year. The three gauging stations are at Hajiganj, Raipur, and Hazimara.
