= Daganbhuiyan Upazila =

Daganbhuiyan দাগনভূঁইয়া
- Upazila
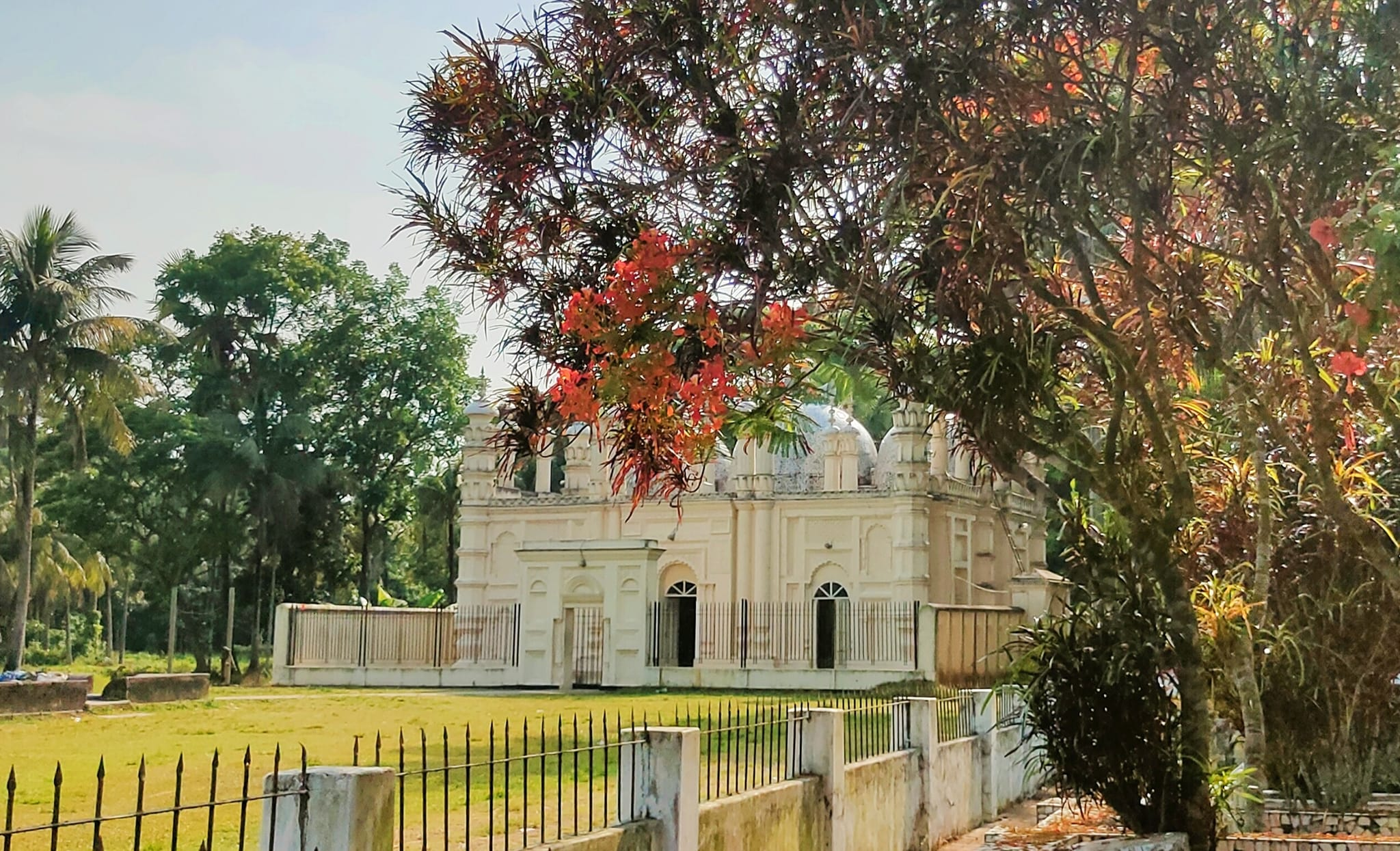
- Ramnagar Chowdhury Bari Jame Mosque, Daganbhuiyan

- Coordinates: 22°56.3′N 91°18.3′E
- Country: Bangladesh
- Division: Chittagong
- District: Feni
- Headquarters: Daganbhuiyan

Area
  - Total: 141.70 km^{2} (54.71 sq mi)

Population (2022)
  - Total: 276,915
  - Density: 1,954.2/km^{2} (5,061.4/sq mi)
- Time zone: UTC+6 (BST)
- Postal code: 3920
- Area code: 0331
- Website: Official Map of Daganbhuiyan

Daganbhuiyan Upazila mauza geocode map

Daganbhuiyan (Bengali: দাগনভূঁইয়া, officially spelled: দাগনভূঞা) is an upazila (sub-district) of Feni District in the division of Chittagong, Bangladesh. It consists of one municipality and eight union parishads.

== Etymology ==
The former name of Daganbhuiyan Upazila was Gopiganj, which was ruled under the Bhulua Kingdom. A review of history shows that the wife of the Zamindar Arun Singh Bahadur was named Gopi Devi who took over the responsibility of her husband's zamindari. From then on, the zamindari became known as Straight Gopiganj after her name. During the Baro-Bhuiyan period, some Bhuiyans settled in this area around a reservoir and from their descendants were the two brothers Dagan Bhuiyan and Matu Bhuiyan. According to the sources of Zamir Ahmed, during the reign of Mughal prince Shah Shuja, many officers and military leaders are known from historical sources to have settled in the Comilla-Noakhali regions. They were granted 'jagirs' (land grants) here in lieu of salaries or pensions. The area from then on came to be known as Daganbhuiyan.

Daganbhuiyan, which was part of the greater Noakhali district formed in 1876 for the administrative needs of the British Raj, was established as Daganbhuiyan Thana in 1979. Feni subdivision was converted into a district in March 1984, and later in 1983, Daganbhuiyan Thana was elevated to Daganbhuiyan Upazila. It was named after the town of Daganbhuiyan located on the Feni River.

== Geography ==
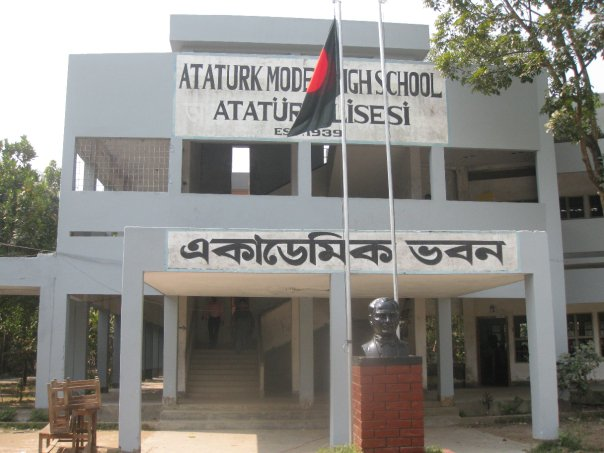
Atatürk Government Model High School

Daganbhuiyan is located at 22.9375°N 91.3042°E. It has a total area of 165.84 km^{2}.

== Demographics ==
Religions in Daganbhuiyan Upazila (2022)
Religion	Percent
Islam	94.37%
Hinduism	5.61%
Other or not stated	0.02%

According to the 2022 Bangladeshi census, Daganbhuiyan Upazila had 62,206 households and a population of 276,915. 9.74% of the population were under 5 years of age. Daganbhuiyan had a literacy rate (age 7 and over) of 80.10%: 81.40% for males and 79.03% for females, and a sex ratio of 84.56 males for every 100 females. 55,545 (20.06%) lived in urban areas.

As of the 2011 Census of Bangladesh, Daganbhuiyan had 49,038 households and a population of 254,402. 59,755 (23.49%) were under 10 years of age. Daganbhuiyan had an average literacy rate of 58.76%, compared to the national average of 51.8%, and a sex ratio of 1142 females per 1000 males. 33,574 (13.20%) of the population lived in urban areas.

== Administration ==
UNO: Nibedita Chakma.

Daganbhuiyan Upazila is divided into Daganbhuiyan Municipality and eight union parishads: Daganbhuiyan, Jayloskor, Matubhuiyan, Purba Chandrapur, Rajapur, Ramnagar, Sindurpur, and Yeakubpur. The union parishads are subdivided into 101 mauzas and 119 villages. Daganbhuiyan Municipality is subdivided into 9 wards and 20 mahallas.

== Public representative ==
Parliamentary Seats

Parliamentary Seats	National Constituency	Member of Parliament	Political Party
267 Feni-3	Daganbhuiyan Upazila and Sonagazi Upazila	Masud Uddin Chowdhury	Jatiya Party (Ershad)

Upazila Parishad and administration

Sr. No.	Designation	Name
01	Upazila Chairman	Didarul Kabir Ratan
03	Vice-Chairman	Jainal Abedin Mamun
04	Female Vice-Chairman	Roksana Akter

== Notable people ==
- Abdus Salam, martyr of the Bengali language movement
- Rahimullah Choudhury, industrialist and politician
- Zahur Hossain Chowdhury, journalist and politician
- Abdul Awal Mintoo, industrialist

== See also ==
- Upazilas of Bangladesh
- Districts of Bangladesh
- Divisions of Bangladesh
