= Rahimullah =

Rahimullah may refer to:

== People ==
- Shahid Rahimullah (died 1861), Bengali revolutionary
- Rahimullah Choudhury, East Pakistani politician
- Rahimullah Yusufzai (1954-2021), Pakistani journalist
- Rahim Ullah (born 1958), Bangladeshi politician
- Rahimullah Sahak (born 1999), Afghan cricketer

== See also ==
- Rahimahullah, Arabic phrase
- Rahimtulla M. Sayani, Indian politician
- Rahimtulla Tower, building in Kenya
