= Mosharraf Hossain (Bangladesh politician, died 2014) =

Bangladeshi politician

Md. Mosharraf Hossain
- মুহাম্মদ মোশাররফ হোসেন

Member of Parliament
- In office 15 February 1996 – 9 January 2014
- Preceded by: Mahbubul Alam Tara
- Succeeded by: Rahim Ullah
- Constituency: Feni-3

Personal details
- Born: 22 January 1940 Ahammadpur, Feni, Bengal Presidency
- Died: 18 August 2014 (aged 74) Dhaka, Bangladesh
- Party: Bangladesh Nationalist Party
- Spouse: Farida Hossain (m. 1966)

Muhammad Mosharraf Hossain (Bengali: মুহাম্মদ মোশাররফ হোসেন; 22 January 1940 – 18 August 2014) was a Bangladesh Nationalist Party politician and a Jatiya Sangsad member from Feni-3 constituency in the 1996, 2001, and 2008 elections. He is the sponsor Director of Islami Bank Bangladesh Limited.

== Early life and family ==
Hossain was born on 22 January 1940 to a Bengali family of Muslim Mukhtars in the village of Ahammadpur in Sonagazi, Feni, then part of the Noakhali district of the Bengal Presidency. He is the eldest son of Belayet Hossain Mukhtar, who was Feni's first advocate. Hossain graduated from the University of Dacca with a Bachelor of Arts in commerce.

== Career ==
Hossain served as the minister of Chittagong Hill Tracts affairs, minister of information, and minister of labour. He served as the president of Bangladesh Association of International Recruiting Agencies.

== Death ==
Hossain died on 18 August 2014 in United Hospital, Dhaka at the age of 75. He was buried in Banani Graveyard.
