= Atatürk Government Model High School =

Government secondary school in Bangladesh

- আতাতুর্ক সরকারি আদর্শ উচ্চ বিদ্যালয়
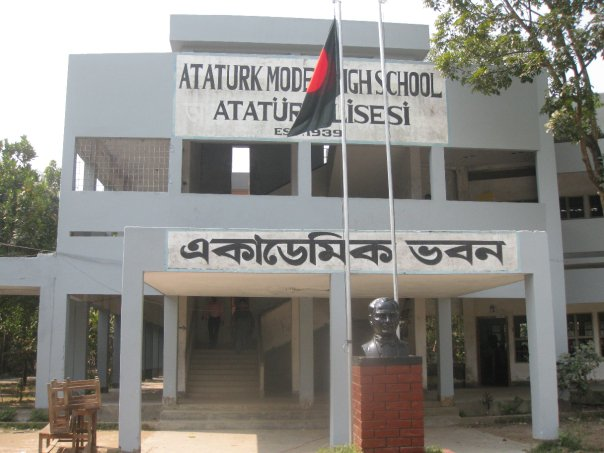
- Academic building of the school with a bust of Mustafa Kemal Atatürk

Location
- Daganbhuiyan, Feni District; Bangladesh
- Coordinates: 22.938687°N 91.303074°E

Information
- Former name: Middle English School
- School type: Secondary
- Established: 6 January 1939
- Headmaster: Muhammad Enayet Ullah
- Grades: 6–10
- Enrollment: 1365
- Campus size: 8 acres
- Website: ataturkschool.edu.bd

Atatürk Government Model High School is a secondary school located in Feni District of Bangladesh. It is one of the oldest schools in the district. The school built on 8 acres of land is named after Mustafa Kemal Atatürk, the father of the nation and the first president of Turkey.

== History ==
Mizanur Rahman, the then subdivisional officer of Feni, established this school on 6 January 1939 with the help of some local people. At the time of establishment it was named "Middle English School". After the establishment of the school, Jalaluddin Ahmad served as its headmaster until 1951. In 1981, Turkish foreign minister İlter Türkmen and the then Turkish ambassador to Bangladesh, Metin Serman, and on 24 December 1982, the Turkish president, Kenan Evren, visited the school. Later a technical team sent to Bangladesh made recommendations to the president. Based on that recommendation, the government of Turkey donated ৳20 million for the construction of the school's new building. On 21 January 2016, Sheikh Hasina promised as the prime minister of the country that her ministry will ensure government-funded educational institution for every districts and upazilas. Subsequently, the Atatürk Model High School was ordered to be nationalised through a notification issued on 11 April 2018.

== Controversy ==
In 2017, Mubarak Hossain, the headmaster, was formally charged with the executive officer of Daganbhuiyan Upazila by the guardian of a student accusing him of admission trading. According to a report of Hazarika Pratidin, there are accusations of arbitrariness in the school administration against him. On 18 January 2021, in a human chain and protest program held by local residents in Daganbhuiyan, the protesters raised various allegations against him and demanded his resignation and called on the school administration to solve various problems of the school.

== Notable alumni ==
- Abdul Awal Mintoo
- Abdus Salam
