= Joy Narayanpur =

- Village
- Location in Bangladesh
- Coordinates: 23°0′9″N 91°17′21″E
- Country: Bangladesh
- Division: Chittagong Division
- District: Feni District
- Upazila: Daganbhuiyan Upazila

Area
  - Land: 1.244 sq mi (3.221 km^{2})

Population (2022)
  - Total: 7,554
  - Density: 6,074.1/sq mi (2,345.23/km^{2})
- Time zone: UTC+6 (Bangladesh Time)

Joy Narayanpur is a village at Daganbhuiyan Upazila in Feni District in the Chittagong Division of Bangladesh. The total land area of the village is 796 acres. According to the 2022 Bangladeshi census, the village has a population of 7554.
