= Mahbubul Alam Tara =

Bangladeshi politician

- মাহাবুবুল আলম তারা
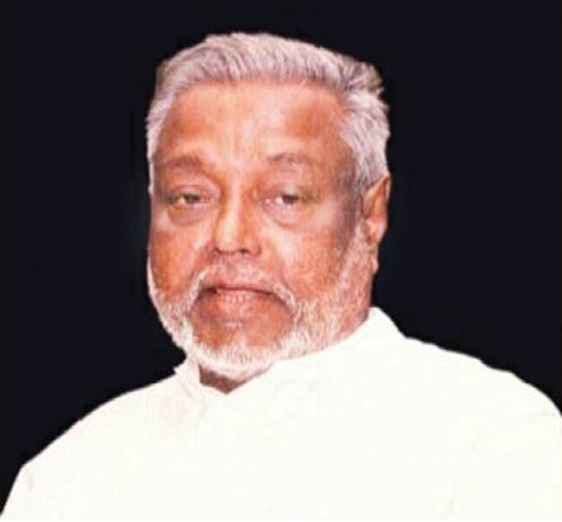

Member of the Bangladesh Parliament for Feni-3
- In office 5 April 1991 – 15 February 1996
- Preceded by: Majibul Haque Chowdhury
- Succeeded by: Mosharraf Hossain

Personal details
- Born: 1939 Farhadnagar, Feni, Bengal Presidency
- Died: 2014 (aged 74–75) Singapore
- Party: Bangladesh Nationalist Party

Mahbubul Alam (Bengali: মাহাবুবুল আলম; 1939–2014), popularly known by his daak naam Tara Miah (Bengali: তারা মিঞা), was a Bangladeshi entrepreneur, politician, and member of parliament.

== Early life ==
Tara was born in 1939 to a Bengali Muslim family in the village of Farhadnagar in Sonagazi, Feni, then part of the Noakhali district of the Bengal Presidency. He studied at the Khaiyara School in Farhadnagar, and Chittagong Collegiate School. Tara started his political career while studying at Chittagong College. He was elected VP of the student council in 1962–63. He organized student movements against the then autocratic ruler. He Studied in the Department of Economics of University of Dhaka.

== Career ==
Tara was involved in the 1969 mass movement in East Pakistan and actively supported the Mukti Bahini during Bangladesh Liberation War.

Tara was the member of parliament for constituency Feni-3 from 1991 to 1996. He was elected as a candidate of the Bangladesh Nationalist Party. He was chief whip in the parliament of Bangladesh. In 1998, he was the president of Bangladesh Jatiyatabadi Krishak Dal.

Tara was popularly known as 'Tara Mia'. He was also the pioneer of the packaging industry in Bangladesh. He, along with his friends, established National Credit and Commerce Bank Limited (NCC Bank). He was chairman of NCC Bank twice. He established Mahbubul Huq High School in his village Faradnagar.

== Death ==
Tara died at National University Hospital at Singapore on 3 June 2014; he was suffering from lung problems.
