= Shah Jahan on Horseback =

17th-century Mughal painting by Payag

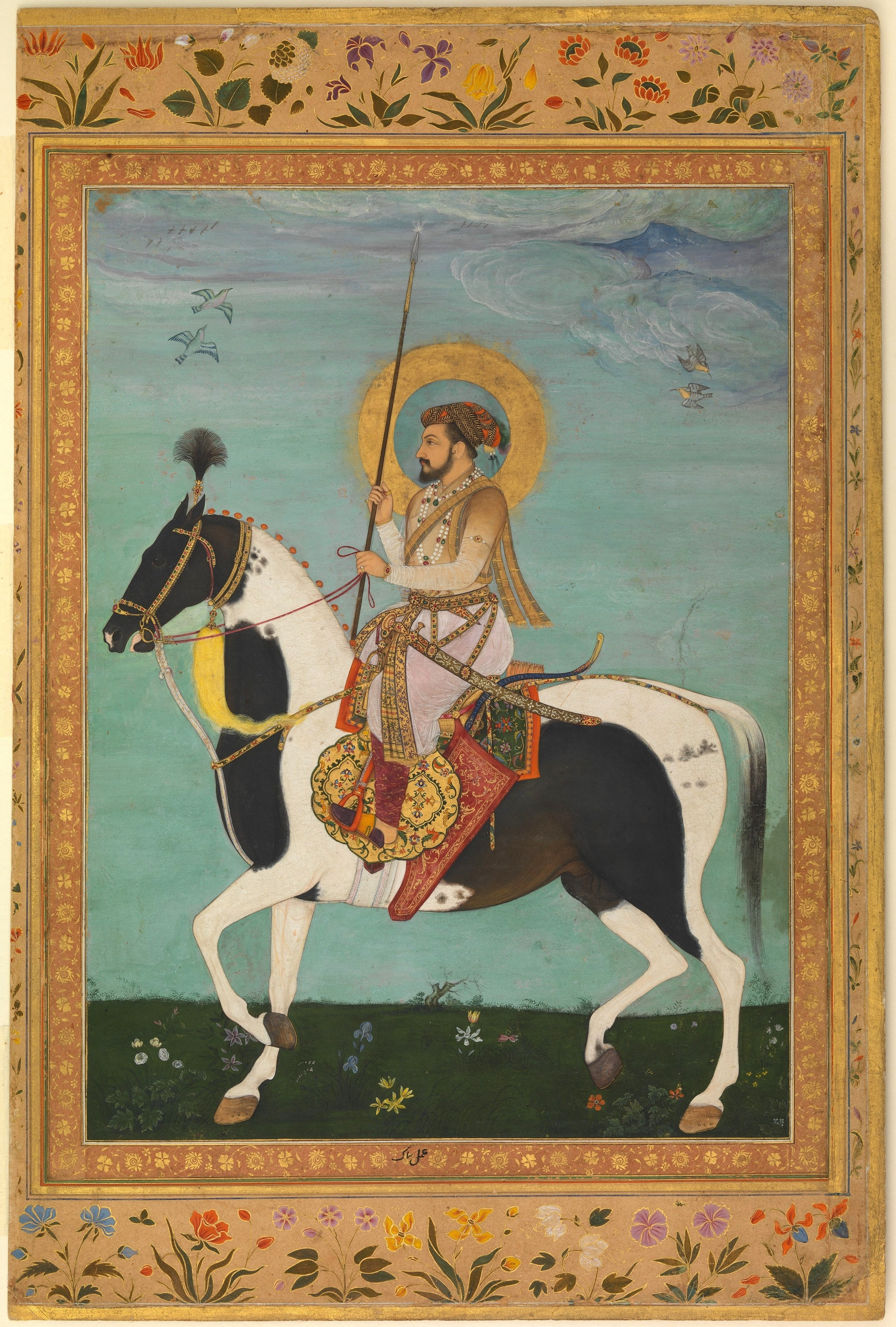
- Artist: Payag
- Movement: Mughal painting
- Location: Metropolitan Museum of Art, New York City

Shah Jahan on Horseback is a 17th-century Mughal painting, executed by the artist Payag. Commissioned by the emperor Shah Jahan shortly after his accession, this work depicts the lavishly dressed emperor riding upon a stallion. It is now in the Metropolitan Museum of Art in New York.

== Description ==
The painting depicts the Mughal emperor Shah Jahan riding a stallion. The black-bearded emperor is depicted with a golden halo around his head. He is depicted in profile as painting the emperor head-on was viewed as disrespectful. He is wearing a translucent white jama, a golden sash, and embroidered pants. Around his neck are necklaces featuring pearls, emeralds, and rubies. In one hand, he is carrying a spear. In the other, he is holding the reins of the steed, and this hand features a diamond ring. He possesses a sword and a bow, both weapons encrusted with jewels. The golden straps worn by his horse are also adorned with jewels. A yak-tail is attached to the horse's neck.

The background is a blue-green sky, with the colors achieved using malachite, among other pigments. sky features two flying pairs of birds—pigeons on the left and hoopoes on the right.

The painting is framed by two borders. The outer border features colorful plants, while the inner border consists of golden flowers on a pink background. On the inner border, a Persian inscription in the Nastaliq script, executed in black ink by Shah Jahan himself reads, "Work of Payag", identifying the artist.

== Analysis ==
This idealized depiction of the emperor exemplifies the style of Mughal imperial portraiture that developed after the accession of Shah Jahan. During the reigns of his predecessors Jahangir and Akbar, portraits were painted to be actual likenesses of the subjects. However, the portraits patronized by Shah Jahan are idealized, with all signs of aging and weakness removed. This trend corresponds with the rise in orthodoxy and strict court etiquette during Shah Jahan's reign. Stuary Cary Welch, in his analysis of the work, writes, "In his supremely imperial portraits, every jewel, sash end, and whisker are as perfect as his smile. Payag’s equestrian image conforms to this rubric—even the horse is idealized".

Navina Najat Haidar notes that the image, copied numerous times up until the 19th century, became emblematic of the idea of the "Grand Mughal".
