= Matubhuiyan Union =

Matubhuiyan Union মাতুভূঁইয়া ইউনিয়ন
- Union
- Location in Bangladesh
- Coordinates: 22.954°N 91.332°E
- Country: Bangladesh
- Division: Chittagong
- District: Feni
- Upazila: Daganbhuiyan
- Time zone: UTC+6 (BST)
- Website: matubhuiyanup.feni.gov.bd

Matubhuiyan (Bengali: মাতুভূঁইয়া ইউনিয়ন) is a union parishad under Daganbhuiyan Upazila, Feni District, Chittagong Division, Bangladesh. It was established in 1959.

Matubhuiyan Union has a total area of 2,702 acres (1,093 ha). The Chotta Feni River flows south through the union. Matubhuiyan Union is divided into 10 mauzas: Ashrafpur, Dakshin Dharmmapur, Dakshin Lalpur, Krishna Rampur, Maheshpur, Mamarizpur, Paschim Hirapur, Ramanandapur, Salamnagar (Lakhanpur), and Uttar Alipur.

== Notable residents ==
- Abdus Salam, a martyr of the Bengali language movement, was born in Lakhanpur village in 1925.
