= Daganbhuiyan =

Town in Feni District, Chittagong Division

- Location of Daganbhuiyan town in Bangladesh
- Coordinates: 22.912745°N 91.318096°E
- Country: Bangladesh
- Division: Chittagong Division
- District: Feni District
- Upazila: Daganbhuiyan Upazila

Government
  - Type: Mayor–Council
  - Body: Daganbhuiyan Municipality

Area
  - Total: 14.4 km^{2} (5.6 sq mi)

Population (2011)
  - Total: 33,574
  - Density: 2,330/km^{2} (6,040/sq mi)
- Time zone: UTC+6 (Bangladesh Time)
- National Dialing Code: +880

Daganbhuiyan Municipality mahallah geocode map

Daganbhuiyan (Bengali: দাগনভূঁইয়া) is a town and paurashava (municipality) in Feni district of Chittagong Division, Bangladesh. The town is the headquarter and urban centre of Daganbhuiyan Upazila.
