= Islam Khan II =

Grand Vizier of the Mughal Empire from 1639 to 1645

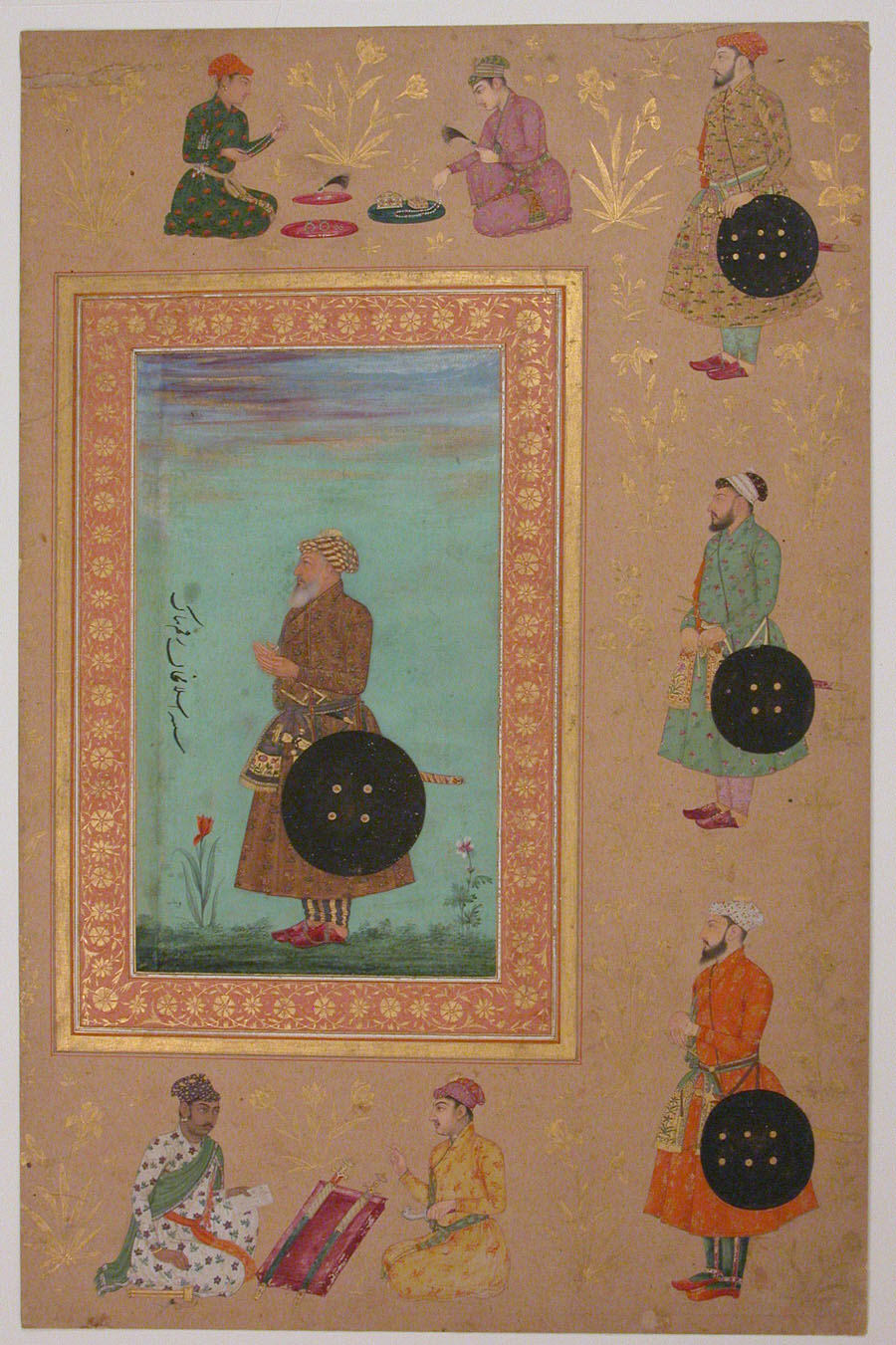
- Portrait of Islam Khan II Mashadi by artist Payag.

21st Subahdar of Bengal
- In office 3 May 1635 – 12 March 1639
- Preceded by: Azam Khan II
- Succeeded by: Shah Shuja

Grand Vizier of the Mughal Empire
- In office 1639–1645
- Preceded by: Afzal Khan Shirazi
- Succeeded by: Sa'adullah Khan

Personal details
- Born: Mir Abdus Salam Tabriz, Safavid Empire
- Died: 3 August 1656 Kabul, Mughal Empire

Islam Khan Mashadi (fl. 3 May 1635 – c. 3 August 1656) was the Mughal Subahdar of Bengal and later Grand Vizier during the period 1639–1645. His original name was Mir Abdus Salam. He was also served high service in Viceroy of Kabul from 1647 till his death in 1656.

== History ==
In 1639, soon after the Ahom-Mughal and Arakan-Mughal battles, Islam Khan Mashhadi was recalled to Delhi to assume the post of Wazir (Prime Minister). Prince Shah Shuja succeeded him as the new governor of Bengal. Islam Khan II then became the governor of the Deccan provinces in the year 1646-1647. Islam Khan's success in fighting the Assam impressed the emperor, and he invited Islam Khan back to the capital and made him grand vizier. Afterwards, Shah Jahan wanted to make Saad Ullah Khan the vizier. Islam Khan understood and volunteered himself for the viceroyalty of the Deccan, which Shah Jahan approved. Islam Khan fell ill on his way to the Deccan, and died in 1656. In his will, he divided his property among his sons and brothers, and sent 25 lakhs to the emperor. While the imperial policy was to confiscate all of the property of the jagirdars, on account of his loyalty Shah Jahan chose to overlook this.

== Family ==
Islam Khan Mashadi had six surviving sons at the time of his death.

- Ashraf Khan, who served as a general in Sulaiman Shikoh's army and then briefly as governor of Kashmir, died without any sons in 1686;
- Safi Khan, who distinguished himself fighting against Dara Shikoh, served successively as Governor of Orissa, Governor of Delhi and Governor of Agra. His son, also named Mir Abdus Salam after his grandfather, entitled Islata Khan, was a high official in Agra during Farrukhsiyar's reign, and was involved in a conspiracy to replace Farrukhsiyar with Nekusiyar, a grandson of Aurangzeb. Safi Khan had another son who was also named Islam Khan- his grandson, Mian Kheesa who was also given the title of Islam Khan V by Bahadur Shah I, was the quarter-master general of the emperor. He in turn had two sons- Barkhurdar Khan and Ghulam Muhammad, and the latter was killed in the Battle of Buxar in 1764.
- Mir Muhammad Sharif, who served as the Bakhshi of Agra;
- Mir Muhammad Ghiyas, who served as the Bakhshi of Aurangbad during Aurangzeb's reign and died in 1680;
- Abdur Rahim Khan, who was the superintendent of the pages during Shah Jahan's reign, died in 1681;
- Mir Abdur Rahman, who served as the superintendent of the revenue department of Aurangbad.

Preceded by Azam Khan	Subahdar of Bengal; 3 May 1635 – 12 March 1639	Succeeded by Prince Shah Shuja

== See also ==
- List of rulers of Bengal
- History of Bengal
- History of India
