= Feni-3 =

Constituency of Bangladesh's Jatiya Sangsad

Coordinates: 22.94°N 91.30°E

- Constituency for the Jatiya Sangsad
- District: Feni District
- Division: Chittagong Division
- Electorate: 508,194 (2026)

Current constituency
- Created: 1984
- Party: Bangladesh Nationalist Party
- Member: Abdul Awal Mintoo
- ← 266 Feni-2 268 Noakhali-1 →

Feni-3 is a constituency represented in the Jatiya Sangsad (National Parliament) of Bangladesh since 2026 by Abdul Awal Mintoo of the Bangladesh Nationalist Party.

== Boundaries ==
The constituency encompasses Daganbhuiyan and Sonagazi upazilas.

== History ==
The constituency was created in 1984 from the Noakhali-3 constituency when the former Noakhali District was split into three districts: Feni, Noakhali, and Lakshmipur.

Ahead of the 2008 general election, the Election Commission redrew constituency boundaries to reflect population changes revealed by the 2001 Bangladesh census. The 2008 redistricting altered the boundaries of the constituency.

== Members of Parliament ==
Election	Member	Party
1986	Majibul Haque Chowdhury	Jatiya Party
1991	Mahbubul Alam Tara	Bangladesh Nationalist Party
Jun 1996	Md. Mosharaf Hossain	Bangladesh Nationalist Party
2001	Md. Mosharaf Hossain	Bangladesh Nationalist Party
2008	Md. Mosharaf Hossain	Bangladesh Nationalist Party
2014	Rahim Ullah	Independent
2018	Masud Uddin Chowdhury	Jatiya Party (Ershad)
2024	Masud Uddin Chowdhury	Jatiya Party (Ershad)
2026	Abdul Awal Mintoo	Bangladesh Nationalist Party

== Elections ==
=== Elections in the 2020s ===
General election 2026: Feni-3
Party	Candidate	Votes	%	±%
BNP	Abdul Awal Mintu			
Jamaat	Mohammad Fakhruddin	108,160		
Majority				
Turnout				
Registered electors		508,194		
BNP gain from JP(E)				

=== Elections in the 2010s ===
General Election 2014: Feni-3
Party	Candidate	Votes	%	±%
Independent	Rahim Ullah	57,615	79.0	N/A
JP(E)	Anowarul Kabir	15,341	21.0	N/A
Majority		42,274	57.9	+40.4
Turnout		72,956	22.0	−61.7
Independent gain from BNP				

=== Elections in the 2000s ===
General Election 2008: Feni-3
Party	Candidate	Votes	%	±%
BNP	Md. Mosharraf Hossain	134,939	57.1	−11.3
AL	Abul Bashar	93,630	39.6	+9.0
Independent	Sayeed Hossain Chowdhury	3,105	1.3	N/A
NAP	Jahirul Hoque	2,906	1.2	N/A
IAB	Abdur Razzak	1,343	0.6	N/A
BSD	Abdul Malek Monsur	325	0.1	N/A
Majority		41,309	17.5	−20.3
Turnout		236,248	83.7	+16.5
BNP hold				

General Election 2001: Feni-3
Party	Candidate	Votes	%	±%
BNP	Md. Mosharraf Hossain	94,321	68.4	+16.3
AL	Mahbubul Alam Tara	42,212	30.6	−7.0
IJOF	Maulana Ataur Rahman Arefi	721	0.5	N/A
JSD	Abdur Rahim	209	0.2	N/A
Independent	Mizanur Rahman	192	0.1	N/A
Independent	Md. Kabir Ahammad	178	0.1	N/A
Jatiya Party (M)	Md. Israfil	69	0.1	N/A
Independent	Mohi Uddin Ahmed	50	0.0	N/A
Majority		52,109	37.8	+23.3
Turnout		137,952	67.2	−0.1
BNP hold				

=== Elections in the 1990s ===
General Election June 1996: Feni-3
Party	Candidate	Votes	%	±%
BNP	Md. Mosharaf Hossain	58,439	52.1	+7.0
AL	Joynal Abedin Hazari	42,182	37.6	−0.9
Jamaat	A. B. M. Samsuddin	8,403	7.5	−5.8
JP(E)	Majibul Haque Chowdhury	1,578	1.4	−0.9
IOJ	Ataur Rahman	842	0.8	N/A
Social Democratic	Dil Afraj	389	0.3	N/A
Zaker Party	Md. Sirajul Islam	206	0.2	0.0
Jatiya Samajtantrik Dal-JSD	Abdur Rahim	145	0.1	−0.2
NAP (Bhashani)	Rafiq Uddin Ahmed Intu Mian	48	0.0	−0.2
Majority		16,257	14.5	+7.9
Turnout		112232	67.3	+24.7
BNP hold				

General Election 1991: Feni-3
Party	Candidate	Votes	%	±%
BNP	Mahbubul Alam Tara	40,406	45.1	
AL	A B M Taleb Ali	34,467	38.5	
Jamaat	Md. Mostafa	11,868	13.3	
JP(E)	Abdur Rasul	2,049	2.3	
Jatiya Samajtantrik Dal-JSD	Nurul Absar	288	0.3	
Zaker Party	Mau. Khurshid Alam	164	0.2	
NAP (Bhashani)	Rafiq Uddin	163	0.2	
NAP (Muzaffar)	Halimullah Khaddar	111	0.1	
Majority		5,939	6.6	
Turnout		89,516	42.6	
BNP gain from JP(E)				
