= Abdus Salam (activist) =

Bengali Language Movement protester (1925–1952)

- আব্দুস সালাম
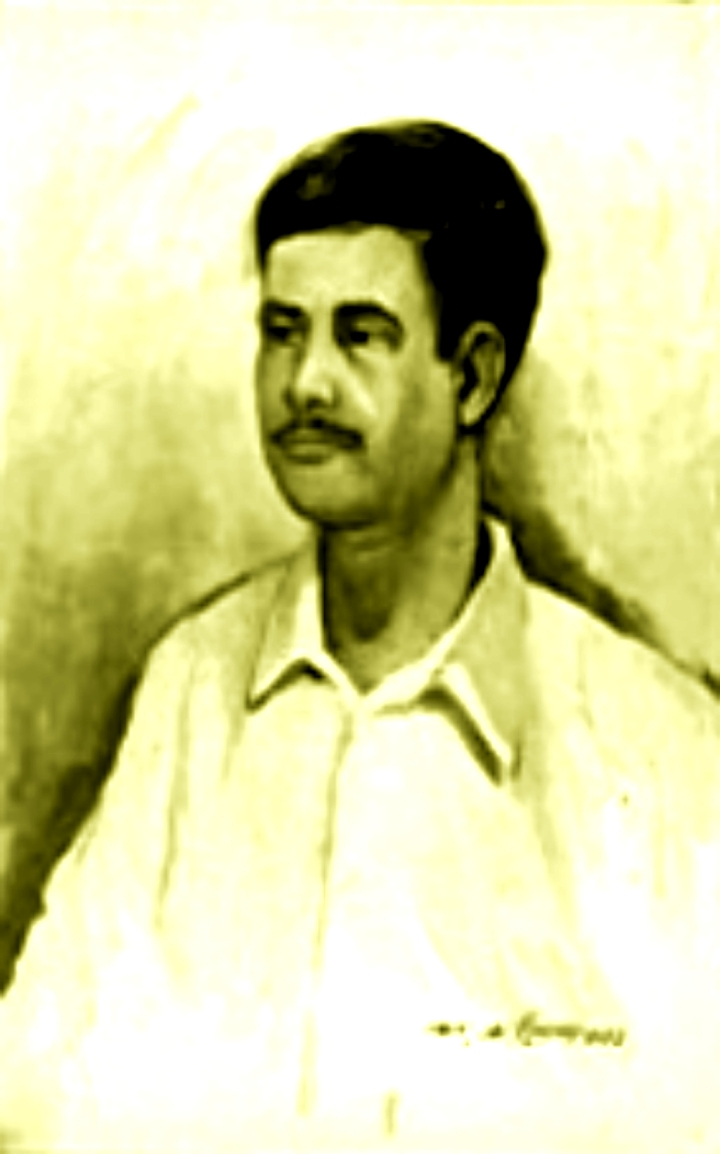
- Language martyr, Abdus Salam
- Born: 27 November 1925; Matubhuiyan, Bengal Presidency, British India
- Died: 7 April 1952 (aged 26); Dacca, East Bengal, Pakistan
- Known for: Bengali language movement

Abdus Salam (27 November 1925 — 7 April 1952) was a demonstrator who died during the Bengali language movement demonstrations which took place in the erstwhile East Bengal (currently Bangladesh), Pakistan in 1952. He is considered a martyr in Bangladesh.

== Early life ==
Abdus Salam was born on 27 November 1925 in Laxmanpur (renamed 'Salam Nagar'), Matubhuiyan, Daganbhuiyan, Feni, East Bengal, British Raj. He studied in Krishnarampur Primary School, then at Matubhuiyan Kalimullah Minor School. He then joined the Daganbhuiyan Kemal Atatürk High School but dropped out at class 10 because of financial constraints.

== Career ==
Abdus Salam went to Kolkata where he stayed with his cousin and her husband who worked in the Port of Kolkata. Abdus Salam was able to get a job in the port. In 1947 he moved to Dhaka and got a job at the department of industries as cleric record keeper. He received a place to stay in the government housing Palasi Barrack at Azimpur.

== Bengali language movement ==
On 21 February 1952, the students in Dhaka defied Section 144 (curfew) and bought out rallies in support of making Bengali a state language of Pakistan. The processions was joined by other members of public beside students. The police fired on the procession killing a number of protesters and wounding others. Abdus Salam was in the procession and was shot. He was admitted to Dhaka Medical College Hospital where he died from his injuries on 7 April 1952. He was buried in Azimpur graveyard. The location of his grave has since been lost.

== Legacy ==
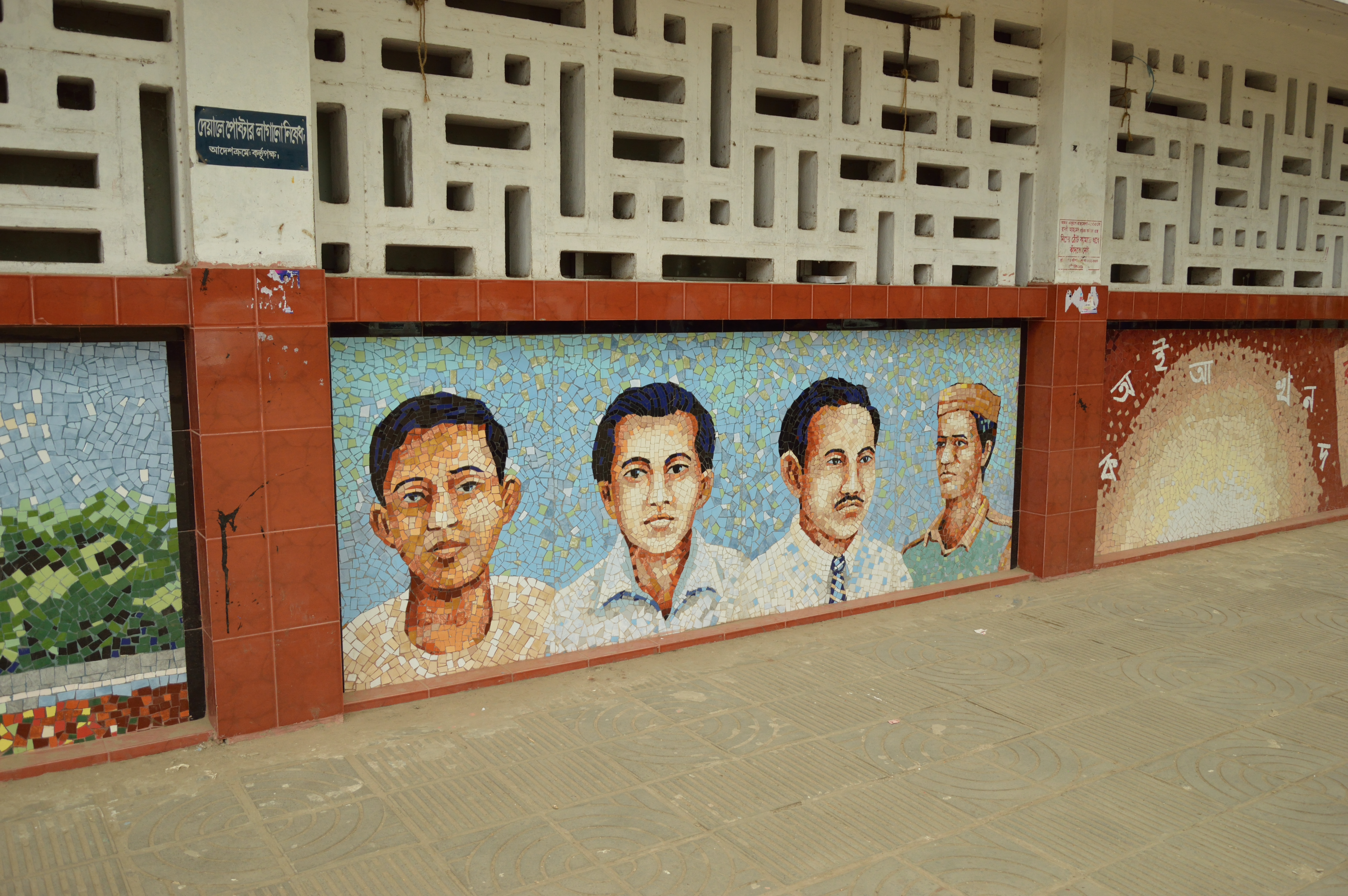
Mural of Abul Barkat, Rafiq Uddin Ahmed, Abdus Salam, Abdul Jabbar titled Bengali Language Movement 1952 Martyrs at Teacher-Student Center in University of Dhaka

Abdus Salam was awarded Ekushey Padak in 2000 by the government of Bangladesh. The organisation Bhasha-Shahid Abdus Salam Smriti Parishad was formed to preserve his memory. His village, Laxmanpur, was renamed Salam Nagar by the villagers in 2000. The government of Bangladesh officially recognised the name in 2009. Language Martyr Salam Auditorium was built in Daganbhuiyan. The Feni District Stadium was renamed Language Martyr Salam Stadium. Language Martyr Salam Community Centre was built in Feni. In 2008 government of Bangladesh built Language Martyr Abdus Salam Library and Memorial Museum near his village school. He has been immortalised in poetry of Shamsur Rahman, Sufia Kamal, and Belal Mohammad etc. He was awarded the Independence Day Award in 2016.
