= Sonagazi Upazila =

Upazila in Chittagong Division, Bangladesh

Sonagazi সোনাগাজী
- Upazila
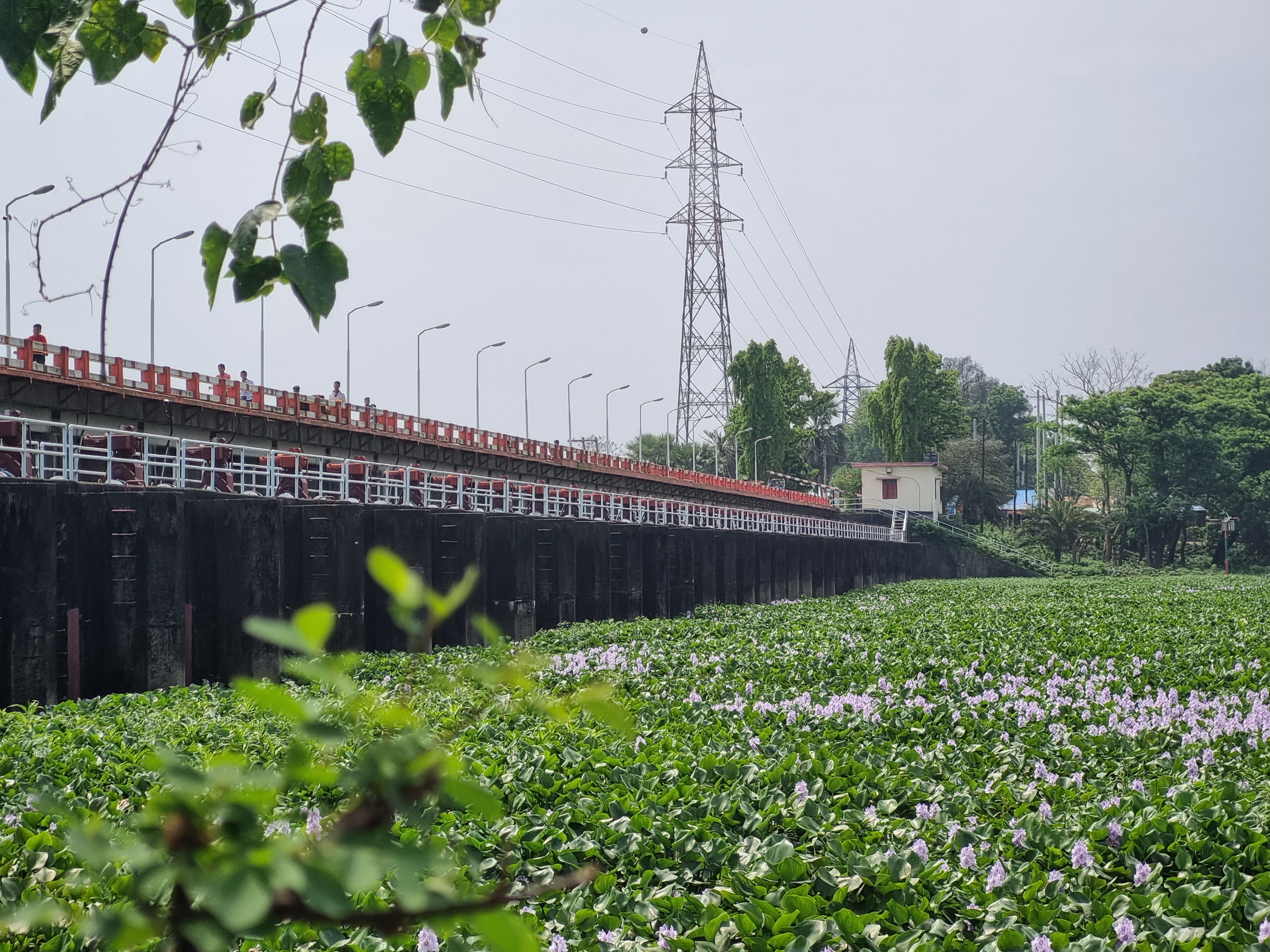
- Feni river closure dam

- Coordinates (Sonagazi upazila parishad): 22°51′27.44683″N 91°23′44.02031″E
- Country: Bangladesh
- Division: Chittagong
- District: Feni
- Seat: Sonagazi

Government
  - Upazila parishad chairman: Jahir Uddin Mahmud ( AL)
  - Upazila Nirbahi Officer: Kamrul Hasan

Area
  - Total: 284.9 km^{2} (110.0 sq mi)

Population (2022)
  - Total: 290,667
  - Density: 1,020/km^{2} (2,642/sq mi)
- Time zone: UTC+6 (Bangladesh Standard Time)
- Postal code: 3930
- Area code: 0331
- Website: Official Website of Sonagazi Upazila

Sonagazi Upazila mauza geocode map

Sonagazi (Bengali: সোনাগাজী) is an upazila (sub-district) of Feni District in Chittagong Division, Bangladesh, located on the coast of the Bay of Bengal.

At the 2022 census, its population was 290,000, making it the second most populous upazila in Feni District. The upazila comprises one municipality and nine union councils.

== History ==
=== Etymology ===
There is no single accepted etymology. Legend has it that Sona Ghazi Bhuyan, a notable figure from the Ghazi family of landowners belonging to the Baro-Bhuyan confederacy, played a pivotal role in developing a market for salt trade in the coastal area. The name Sonagazi was selected for the thana established with the market at its center. The official upazila website states that the area was named after Sona Ghazi, a descendant of the wealthy Baro-Bhuyan zamindar Fazl Ghazi. A competing account mentions that after the Battle of Plassey, c. 1780–1800, a preacher named Nayan Ghazi came from the western subcontinent; one of his sons, named Sona Ghazi, became wealthy and influential locally. An opinion piece published in a popular Bangla-language newspaper quotes a local verse about folk-figure Gunai Gazi, listing his companions as Mongazi, Changazi, Shuagazi, Sonagazi, Fulgazi — several of which are now upazila/bazaar names in this region.

=== Bhulua and the Mughal frontier ===
Present-day Sonagazi fell within the old kingdom of Bhulua, a strategically placed tributary state—at times ruled from Tripura—commanding the route to Chittagong. The Mughals conquered Bhulua and deposed its king Ananta Manikya in 1611, under Subahdar Islam Khan.

To hold the new frontier the Mughals established a thana at the mouth of the Feni River at Jugidiya (Jagdia), whose jurisdiction covered significant parts of present-day Sonagazi and Companiganj. Upon his accession to the throne, Mughal Emperor Shah Jahan appointed his son, Shah Shuja, as the subahdar (governor) of Bengal. Upon assuming this role, Shuja swiftly took action to safeguard the coastal areas from Arakanese naval attacks by constructing a fort in Sonagazi among various strategic initiatives. The area surrounding the fort continues to be known as Sujapur in his honor.

=== Colonial era ===
The coastal area was dominated with European activity by the Portuguese, Dutch, French and the English. In 1756, a cloth factory was established by the East India Company at Jugidiya, near the mouth of the Feni river, producing cotton cloth (hafta). Salt and textiles were exported through the port of Jugidiya.

Jugidiya was the last pargana in the district to be settled under the Permanent Settlement, in 1797. Its assessment had fallen by more than 70 percent since 1728, as riverbank erosion destroyed much of its land.

When the Mughal era-established thanas (police jurisdictions) of Jugidiya and Amirgaon were submerged by the Feni River, a new thana named Sonagazi was established in 1886 to reinstate law enforcement measures in the southern region of Feni. Around this period, the governor of Feni mahakuma, Nabinchandra Sen, undertook the construction and improvement of the Feni–Sonagazi road to accommodate bullock carts.

The 1911 gazetteer of Noakhali District lists Sonagazi among the district's chief marts, with timber, rice, linseed and chillies as its principal trade goods. The gazetteer also describes a 17-mile (27 km) road to Chittagong that branched from the Feni–Noakhali road about 6 miles (9.7 km) from Noakhali and ran through the south of the district, past Companiganj, to the Lalganj ferry on the Big Feni. Between the ferry over the Little Feni and "Sonagazi Chaprasi's Hat", where there was a rest-house, it records that the road had been washed away.

=== Liberation war–present day ===
Around the time of the Bangladesh Liberation War, Sonagazi was one of the four thanas within the Feni mahakuma, alongside Feni Sadar, Chhagalnaiya, and Parshuram. During the conflict, guerrilla warfare-trained freedom fighters were dispatched to various areas of Sonagazi, where they carried out numerous operations targeting the residences of collaborators of the invading forces and local razakar militias in locations such as Nababpur, Ahammadpur, Majlishpur, Bogadana, Char Darbesh, Char Chandia, and Motiganj.

On 28 July 1971, during a confrontation between freedom fighters and the Pakistani army at Nababpur, an enemy military commander was killed. On 15 August, approximately 50 Pakistani soldiers were killed when mines planted by the freedom fighters exploded near the Satbaria Bridge. In retaliation, agitated Pakistani soldiers killed five innocent individuals from Boks Ali and Sujapur Dasgram villages. Additionally, the Pakistani army engaged in looting and set fire to numerous houses in the area.

Following the war, mass graves were uncovered in areas like the Kazir Haat sluice gate, indicating the burial of hundreds of individuals who had been subjected to torture, and memorial monuments were erected at eight locations within the upazila.

In 1983, Sonagazi Thana was upgraded to the status of an upazila, one year before Feni was established as a district.

== Geography ==
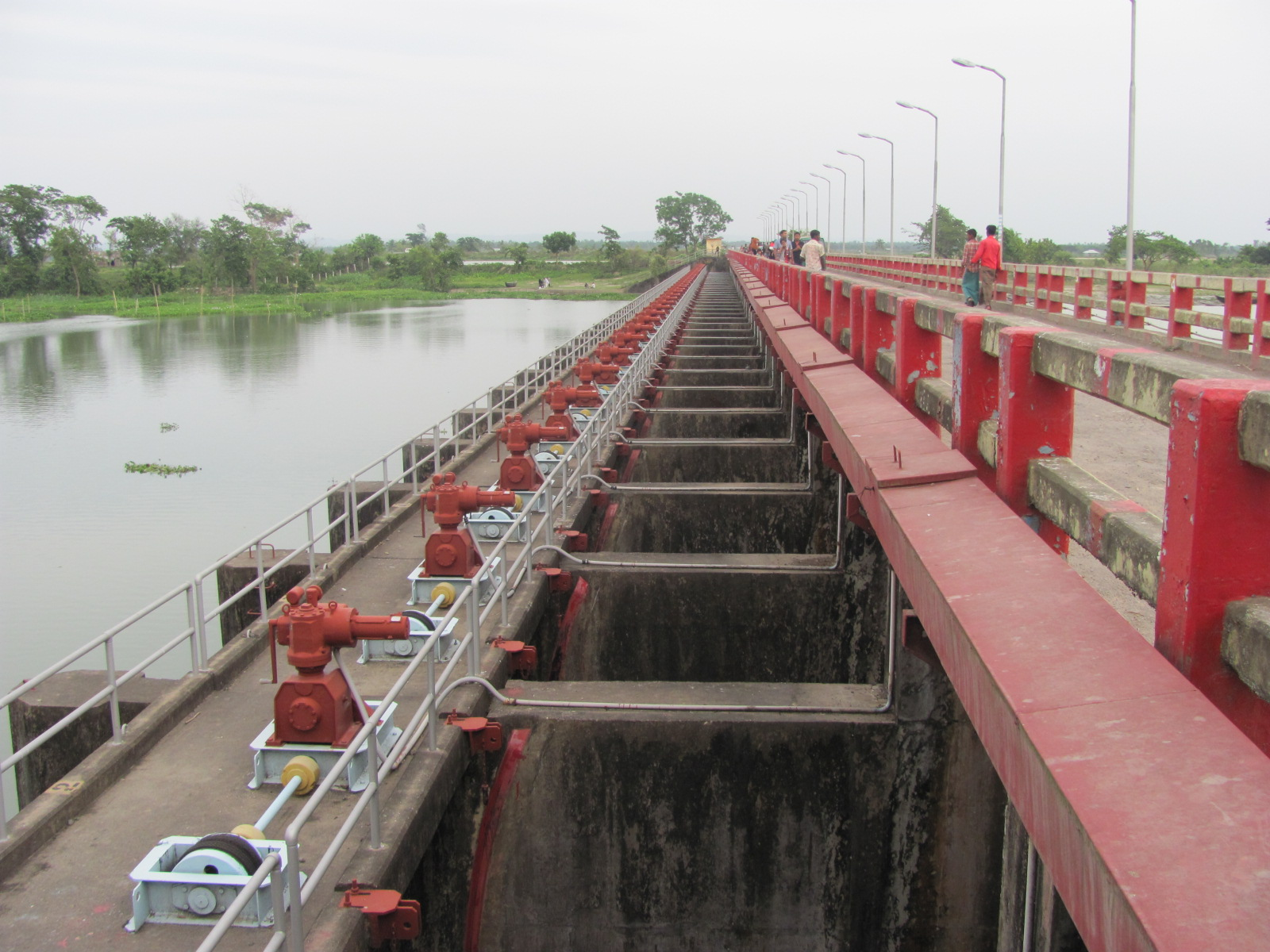
Sonagazi Muhuri Irrigation Project, Feni

Sonagazi Upazila is bounded by Feni Sadar and Daganbhuiyan upazilas on the north, Bay of Bengal on the south, Mirsharai Upazila on the east, and Companiganj Upazila of Noakhali District and Daganbhuiyan Upazila on the west. Situated in the southern part of the district, Sonagazi is the only upazila in Feni District with a coastline along the Bay of Bengal. It covers a total area of 284.89 square kilometres (110.00 sq mi), making it the largest upazila in Feni District, accounting for almost 28.77% of the district's total area.

=== Physical geography ===
The Feni River flows to the east of Sonagazi, while the Little Feni River flows to the west. The estuaries of both rivers converge in the Bay of Bengal, south of Sonagazi.

Extensive alluvial lands, known locally as "char," have formed due to the erosion caused by the Feni and Muhuri rivers, resulting in the displacement of numerous settlements. Examples of such areas include Char Chandia, Char Khondkar, and Char Narayan. Char formation has been documented since the colonial period. The Settlement Report in 1919 documents new chars forming on the same coast (Char Magni, Char Jogini, the growth of Bamni island) by 1791. Around 2012 after the Feni river straightening project, almost 40,000 acres of new char lands emerged in southern Sonagazi, as reported by The Daily Sangram.

== Governance and politics ==
Jahir Uddin Mahmud is the presently elected upazila council (upazila parishad) chairman of Sonagazi Upazila and Kamrul Hasan the appointed upazila executive officer (upazila nirbahi officer or UNO). The upazila is encompassed by the Feni-3 constituency of the Jatiya Sangsad (national parliament).

=== Unions ===
Sonagazi Upazila comprises nine unions, each administered by its respective union council (union parishads), which includes a chairman and 12 elected ward councillors. The general councillors represent their nine respective wards, with three additional reserved seats for women on the council. Cumulatively, the unions comprise a total of 94 mauzas and 95 villages.

List of union councils in Sonagazi Upazila
Number	Name	Area (in acres)	Area (in km^{2})	Population (2022)
1	Char Majlishpur	4,331 acres	17.53 km^{2}	30,265
2	Bogadana	3,337 acres	13.50 km^{2}	25,964
3	Mangalkandi	3,156 acres	12.77 km^{2}	24,476
4	Motigonj	3,364 acres	13.61 km^{2}	28,843
5	Char Dorbesh	12,171 acres	49.25 km^{2}	37,899
6	Char Chandia	14,271 acres	57.75 km^{2}	45,215
7	Sonagazi	11,008 acres	44.55 km^{2}	22,640
8	Amirabad	10,921 acres	44.20 km^{2}	30,805
9	Nababpur	6,523 acres	26.40 km^{2}	19,754

Char Chandia is the largest and most populous union, whereas Mangalkandi is the smallest in size. Nonetheless, Nababpur Union has the smallest population.

=== Municipality ===
Sonagazi Upazila contains one municipality, Sonagazi Municipality (also Sonagazi Paurashava, Bengali: সোনাগাজী পৌরসভা), established in 2002 and spanning an area of 5.04 square kilometres (1.95 sq mi). At the 2022 census, it had a population of 24,808 residents. The municipality is bordered by Motigonj Union to the north, Sonagazi Union to the east, and Char Chandia Union to the west and south. It comprises nine numbered wards, encompassing six villages, seven mauzas and 14 mahallas. Rafiqul Islam Khokan serves as the municipal mayor, elected in the 2021 municipal elections. Each ward is represented by a councillor, with an additional three seats allocated for female councillors.

== Demographics ==
According to the 2022 Bangladeshi census, Sonagazi Upazila had 67,309 households and a population of 290,667. 10.48% of the population were under 5 years of age. Sonagazi had a literacy rate (age 7 and over) of 75.84%: 77.83% for males and 74.18% for females, and a sex ratio of 86.33 males for every 100 females. 40,759 (14.02%) lived in urban areas.

Sonagazi Municipality has a total population of 24,808 and a literacy rate of 81.11%.

=== Religion ===
Religions in Sonagazi Upazila (2022)
Religion	Percent
Islam	94.65%
Hinduism	5.29%
Other or not stated	0.06%

According to the 2022 census, the population of followers of different religions in Sonagazi Upazila is as follows:

- Islam (275,116)
- Hinduism (15,382)
- Christianity (15)
- Buddhism (146)
- Other (8)

Since the 2011 census, the populations of Muslims and Buddhists have increased, whereas the numbers for other religious groups have decreased.

=== Language ===
The language spoken in Sonagazi Upazila shares core characteristics with other upazilas in Bangladesh, but some variations exist. Notably, aspirated consonants are less prevalent in spoken language, suggesting a trend towards linguistic simplification. The regional dialect of Sonagazi Upazila shows similarities to languages spoken in Feni, Noakhali, and Mirsarai. Experts attribute these linguistic features to the geographical influence of the Little Feni and Feni rivers, as well as the coastal environment of Sonagazi.

== Economy ==
Agriculture constitutes a significant portion of the sources of income for Sonagazi, contributing approximately 36.40% to the economy. The primary crop cultivated in the upazila is rice (paddy).

Other major sources of income include commerce (12.67%), services (15.62%), rent and remittance (14.04%), and various other activities such as non-agricultural labor (3.35%), industry (1.58%), transport and communication (4.40%), construction (2.11%), and religious services (0.56%).

=== Agriculture, fishing and trade ===
Fish farming in the Muhuri area developed after the government built a 50-kilometre (31 mi) embankment in 1984. In the coastal "char" areas surrounding the expansive Feni River, agriculture, fish farming, and harvesting marine fish from the river constitute the primary livelihood sources for the local populace. Additionally, residents engage in raising cattle, buffaloes, and sheep in the grazing lands. Buffalo milk and cow's milk from these areas are distributed to other regions. The grazing lands are renowned for the production of buffalo milk and yogurt. Residents of the grazing lands typically reside in tin houses. However, their daily lives are often disrupted by raids and attacks by pirates, posing risks to fishermen and livestock keepers alike. Law enforcement agencies conduct periodic raids in response to these incidents.

Some important marketplaces in Sonagazi include Kuthirhaat, Boktarmunshi Bazar, Mongolkandi, Olama Bazar, Saudagar Haat, Bhairab Chowdhury Bazar, Mongazi Bazar, Sonagazi Bazar, Amirabad Bazar, Nababpur, Bhorbazar, Kazir Haat, Naar Miar Haat, Bagher Haat, Koramia Haat, Motiganj Bazar, Kashmir Bazar etc.

Due to its heavy reliance on agriculture, Sonagazi Upazila has witnessed the emergence of artisans specializing in crafting tools from bamboo and canes for agricultural and household needs. These artisans produce a variety of baskets in different sizes and shapes, suitable for carrying items ranging from fish and crops to laundry. In numerous villages, young women engage in crafting woven handicrafts using jute leaves and jute fiber, employing skills inherited through generations. These handcrafted items are then sold in nearby markets.

=== Remittances ===
In the 2022 census, 125,270 households in Feni District, or 33.85 percent, received foreign remittances. The share was 36.7 percent in rural areas and 26.92 percent in urban areas.

=== Solar power and economic zone land ===
The state-owned Electricity Generation Company of Bangladesh (EGCB) operates a 75 MW solar plant at Purba Bardhali in Char Chandia union, financed by the World Bank's International Development Association and the government. The plant has 187,410 modules and was reported to have cost ৳8.75 billion (equivalent to ৳9.7 billion or US$79 million in 2024). EGCB lists 1 April 2024 as its commercial operation date. EGCB has acquired 999.65 acres (4.0454 km^{2}) in Sonagazi, of which about 285 acres (1.15 km^{2}) are used by the plant. This land lies beside the sea and currently grows no crops because of salinity.

On 1 December 2025 the Executive Committee of the National Economic Council approved a second plant of 220 MW on 634 acres (2.57 km^{2}) of the same land. The project budget is ৳18.88 billion (US$150 million), including a US$143.28 million loan from the Islamic Development Bank.

Some char land in the upazila has also been earmarked for an economic zone. In November 2020 the Dhaka Tribune reported allegations that char land set aside for the zone was being occupied and excavated, and that local officials said drives to protect it would continue.

=== Floods and livelihoods ===
A survey of 855 adults in Sonagazi, Chhagalnaiya and Fulgazi upazilas, conducted in February 2025 and published in Scientific Reports, found that 99.3 percent of respondents said the August 2024 flood had affected their livelihoods. Living in Sonagazi was associated with higher odds of livelihood disruption than living in Chhagalnaiya.

== Infrastructure ==
Sonagazi is renowned for its sluice gate referred to as Muhuri Irrigation Project. Constructed in the late 1980s, this infrastructure serves the purpose of regulating the water flow of the Feni River and irrigating nearby farmland. Later in 2005, a now-defunct 900-kilowatt wind power plant consisting of four wind turbines was constructed near the river. The area has garnered attention as a notable tourist destination in the region.

Sonagazi currently hosts a solar farm generating 75 megawatts of power, with additional plans underway to establish more. Additionally, there are proposals for the constructions of several more wind and combined-cycle power stations to meet the rising energy demand of the nearby Bangabandhu Sheikh Mujib Shilpa Nagar economic zone.

In 2018, a highly anticipated 478-metre-long (1,568 ft) bridge spanning the Little Feni River was inaugurated with the aim of improving connectivity with Noakhali and Lakshmipur districts.

=== Muhuri Irrigation Project ===
The Muhuri Irrigation Project completed in 1986 stands as the nation's second-largest irrigation venture. Its primary objectives include regulating flooding during the monsoon season and provide supplementary irrigation for rice cultivation in most of Feni District including Sonagazi Upazila. The project features a closure dam located in Sonagazi Upazila tasked with regulating the combined flow of the Feni, Muhuri, and Kalidas-Pahalia rivers.

Over the years, Muhuri Irrigation Project area has emerged as a popular recreation and picnic spot. During the winter season, tourists from various parts of the country visit the area. The dam is surrounded by an artificial water body enclosed by embankments, afforestation, bird-watching spots, and fish sanctuaries. During boat rides on the river, visitors can observe various species of ducks and thousands of birds belonging to various species.

=== Transportation and communication ===
Sonagazi is located 26 kilometres (16 mi) from Feni District headquarters. CNG-powered auto-rickshaws, electric rickshaws, and minibuses constitute the primary modes of transportation. As of 2011, Sonagazi Upazila had two bus stops and a network of roads spanning a total distance of 520 kilometres (320 mi).

== Schools and colleges ==
- Al-Helal Academy Sonagazi
- Sonagazi Government College
- Sonagazi Girls' Pilot High School
- Bakter Munshi High School
- Sonagazi Islamia Fazil Degree Madrasah
- Khadijatul Kobra Mohila Madrasah
- Sonagazi Md saber Gov't pilot high school
- Mongazi Fatema Karim School & College

== Notable people ==
- Haque family
  - Abu Belal Shafiul Haque (born 1958), former Chief of Bangladesh Army
  - Annisul Huq (1952–2017), former Mayor of North Dhaka
- Zahir Raihan, filmmaker, was born at Majupur village in 1935.
- Shahidullah Kaiser, writer, was born at Majupur village in 1927.
- Selim Al Deen, playwright, was born at Shenerkhil village in 1949.
- Lt. Gen. Masud Uddin Chowdhury, ndc, psc, MP and Diplomat
- Shomi Kaiser, actress
- Rokeya Prachy, actress
- Mahbubul Alam Tara was the Member of Parliament from constituency Feni-3 from 1991 until 1996.

== See also ==
- Upazilas of Bangladesh
- Districts of Bangladesh
- Divisions of Bangladesh
