= Payag =

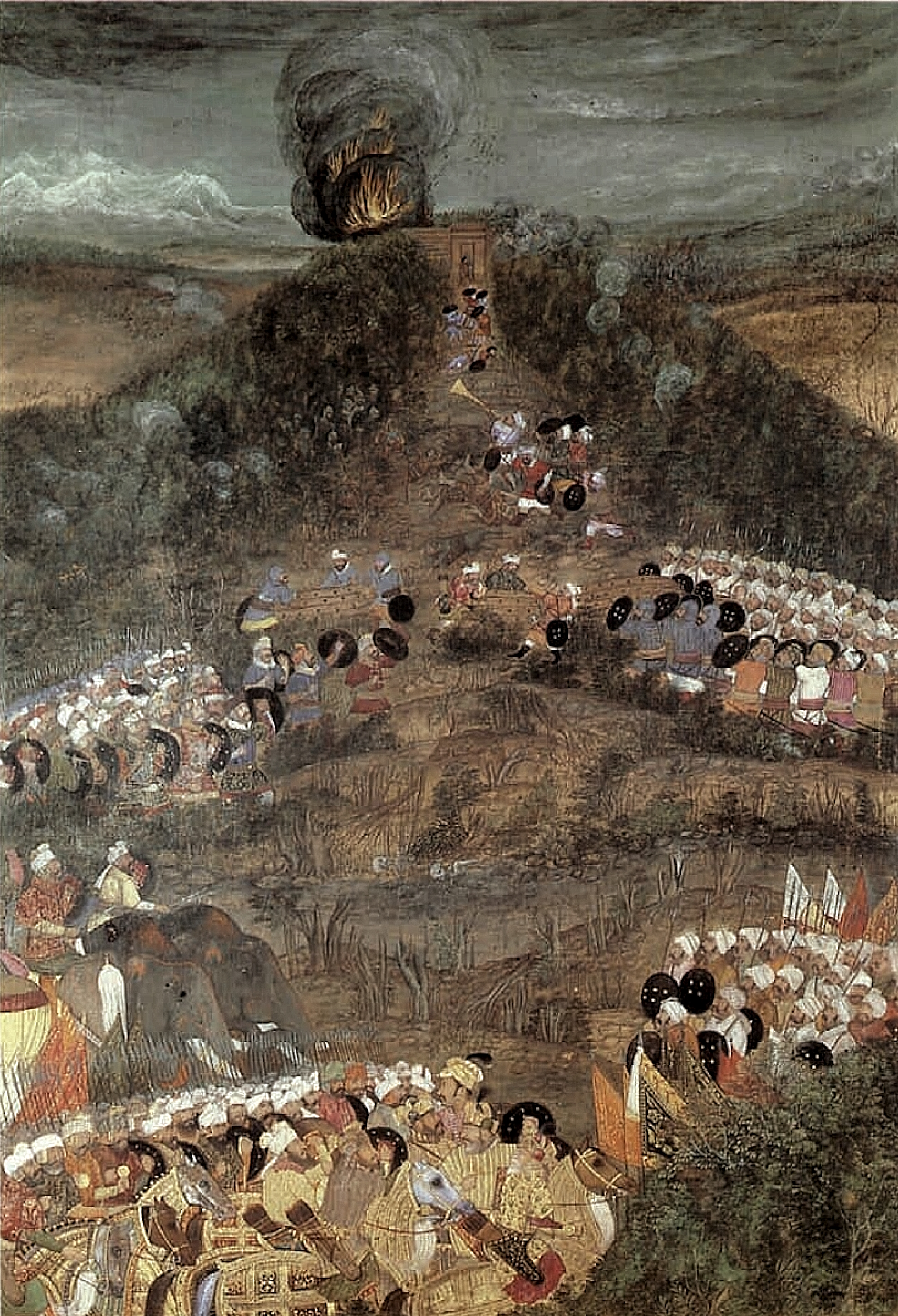
The failed Mughal siege of Kandahar in 1649. Attributed to Payag. Mughal, mid-17th century. Opaque watercolor on paper. The Knellington Collection, Courtesy Harvard University Art Museums, Cambridge, Massachusetts.

Payag was a major Indian Hindu artist of Mughal painting, in the 17th century. He was noted for the dark realism of his paintings, including portraits of holy men and wounded soldiers, describing the horrors of war.

Payag worked for several Mughal rulers, including emperors Akbar, Jahangir, and Shah Jahan. His career lasted about 70 years. He had a brother named Balchand, also a talented painter.

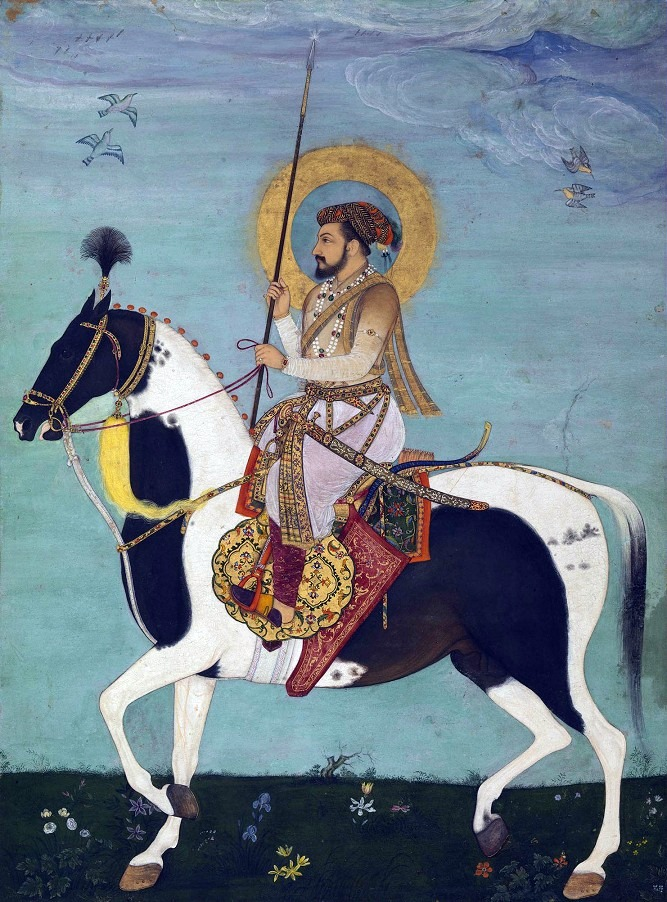
Shah Jahan on Horseback by Payag.

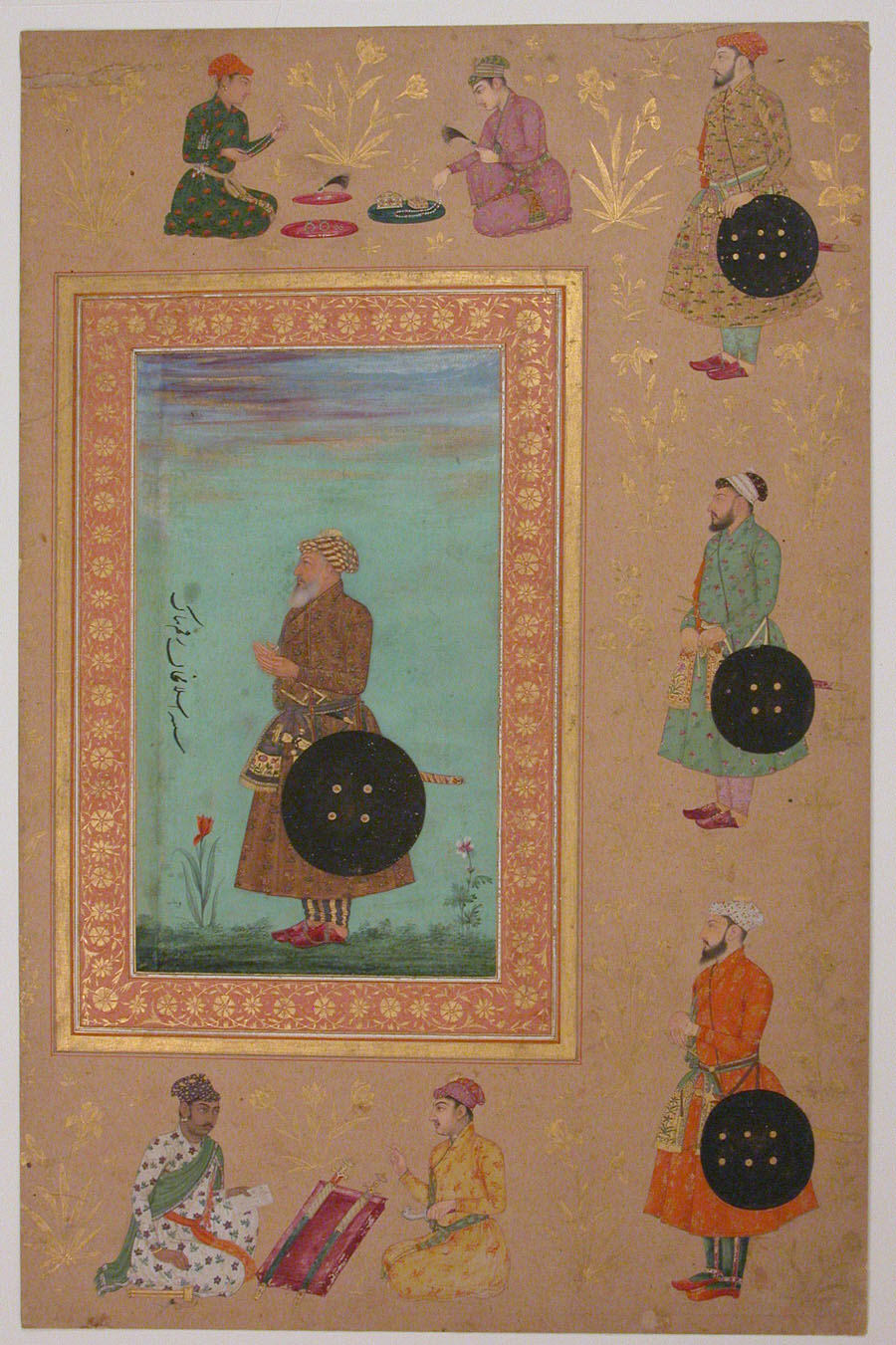
Portrait of Islam Khan II Mashadi by Payag

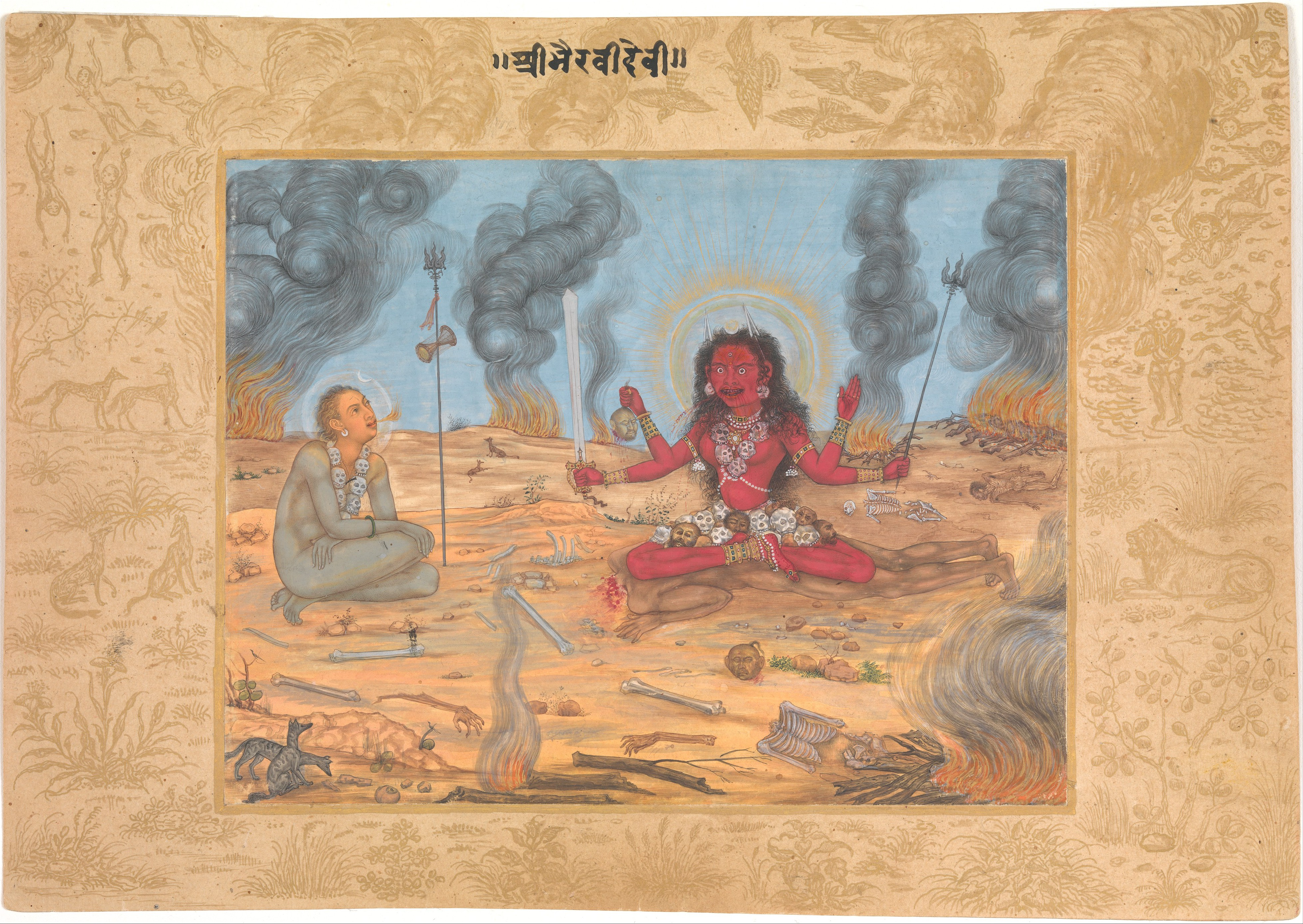
The Goddess Bhairavi Devi with Shiva, by Payag
