= Shah Shuja (Mughal prince) =

Mughal prince and Subahdar of Bengal (1616–1661)

Mirza Shah Shuja
- Timur II; Alexandar III; Shah Shuja Bahadur Ghazi; Abul Fauz Nasir-ud-din Muhammad; Shahzada of the Mughal Empire; Mirza
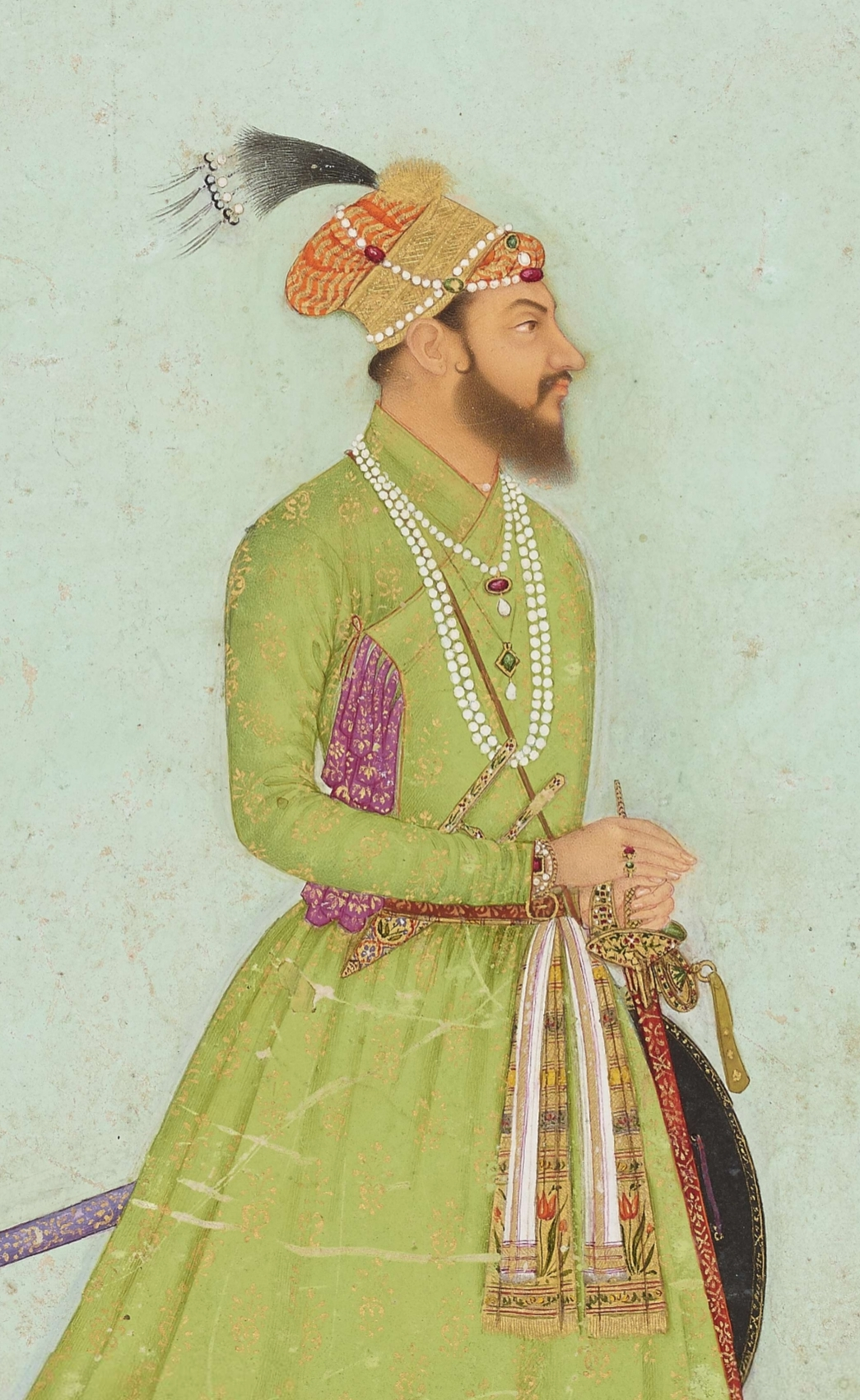
- Shah Shuja by Lalchand c. 1652

22nd Subahdar of Bengal
- Reign: 1 January 1641 – 12 April 1660
- Predecessor: Islam Khan II
- Successor: Mir Jumla II
- Badshah: Shah Jahan; Aurangazeb
- Born: 23 June 1616; Ajmer, Ajmer, Mughal Empire
- Died: 7 February 1661 (aged 44); Mrauk U, Kingdom of Mrauk U
- Spouse: Bilqis Banu Begum (m. 1633; died 1634); Piari Banu Begum; Daughter of Raja Tamsen of Kishtwar
- Issue: Dilpazir Banu Begum; Zain-ud-Din Mirza; Zain-ul-Abidin Mirza; Buland Akhtar Mirza; Gulrukh Banu Begum; Roshan Ara Begum; Amina Banu Begum; Mah Khanum
- House: Mughal dynasty
- Dynasty: Timurid dynasty
- Father: Shah Jahan
- Mother: Mumtaz Mahal
- Religion: Sunni Islam (Hanafi)

Mirza Shah Shuja Persian: مرزا شاه شجاع; 23 June 1616 – 7 February 1661) was the second son of the Mughal Emperor Shah Jahan and Empress Mumtaz Mahal. He was the governor of Bengal and Odisha and had his capital at Dhaka, in present day Bangladesh.

== Early life and family ==
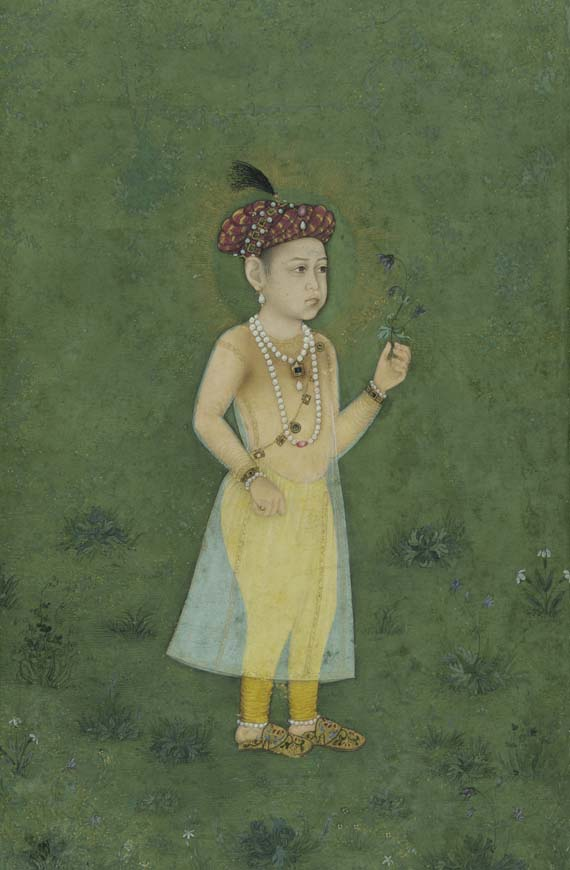
Shah Shuja in his childhood, 1620

Shah Shuja was born on 23 June 1616, in Ajmer. He was the second son and fourth child of the Mughal emperor Shah Jahan and his queen Mumtaz Mahal. Shah Jahan's step-mother and Mumtaz Mahal's aunt, empress Nur Jahan adopted Prince Shah Shuja upon his birth. This new responsibility was given to her due to her high rank, political clout and Jahangir's affection for her. It was also an honour for the empress as Shuja was a special favourite of his grandfather, emperor Jahangir.

Shuja's siblings included his eldest sister Jahanara Begum, Dara Shikoh, Roshanara Begum, Aurangzeb, Murad Baksh, and Gauhara Begum.

== Personal life ==
Shah Shuja first married Bilqis Banu Begum, the daughter of Rustam Mirza Safavi (a descendant of Shah Ismail I of Safavid Empire), on the night of Saturday, 5 March 1633. The marriage was arranged by Princess Jahanara Begum. Rupees 1,60,000 in cash and goods worth one lakh were sent as sachak to the mansion of Rustam Mirza. On 23 February 1633, the wedding presents worth Rupees one million were displayed by Jahanara Begum and Sati-un-nissa Khanum. The following year, she gave birth to a daughter and died in childbirth. She was buried in a separate mausoleum named Kharbuza Mahal, at Burhanpur. Her daughter was named Dilpazir Banu Begum by Shah Jahan, who died as an infant.

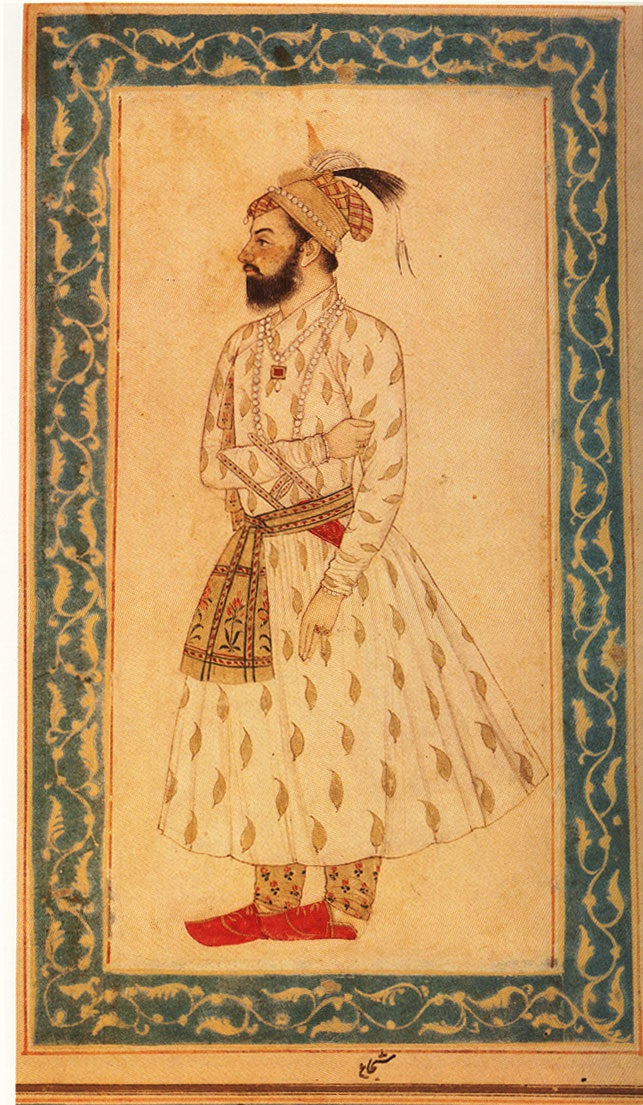
Shuja, Mughal prince

On the death of his first wife, he married Piari Banu Begum, daughter of Azam Khan, the second governor of Bengal during Shah Jahan's reign. She was the mother of two sons and three daughters, namely, Prince Zain-ud-din Mirza, born on 28 October 1639; Prince Zain-ul-Abidin Mirza, born on 20 December 1645; Gulrukh Banu Begum (wife of Prince Muhammad Sultan), Roshan Ara Begum and Amina Banu Begum. In 1660, she fled to Arakan with her husband, sons and daughters. Shuja was murdered in 1661. His sons were put to death. Piari Banu Begum and two of her daughters committed suicide. The remaining daughter, Amina Banu Begum, was brought to the palace, where, from grief, she died an early death. Another daughter, Mah Khanum, married King Sanda Thudhamma. A year later, he scented a plot and starved all of them to death, while his wife was in an advanced stage of pregnancy with his child.

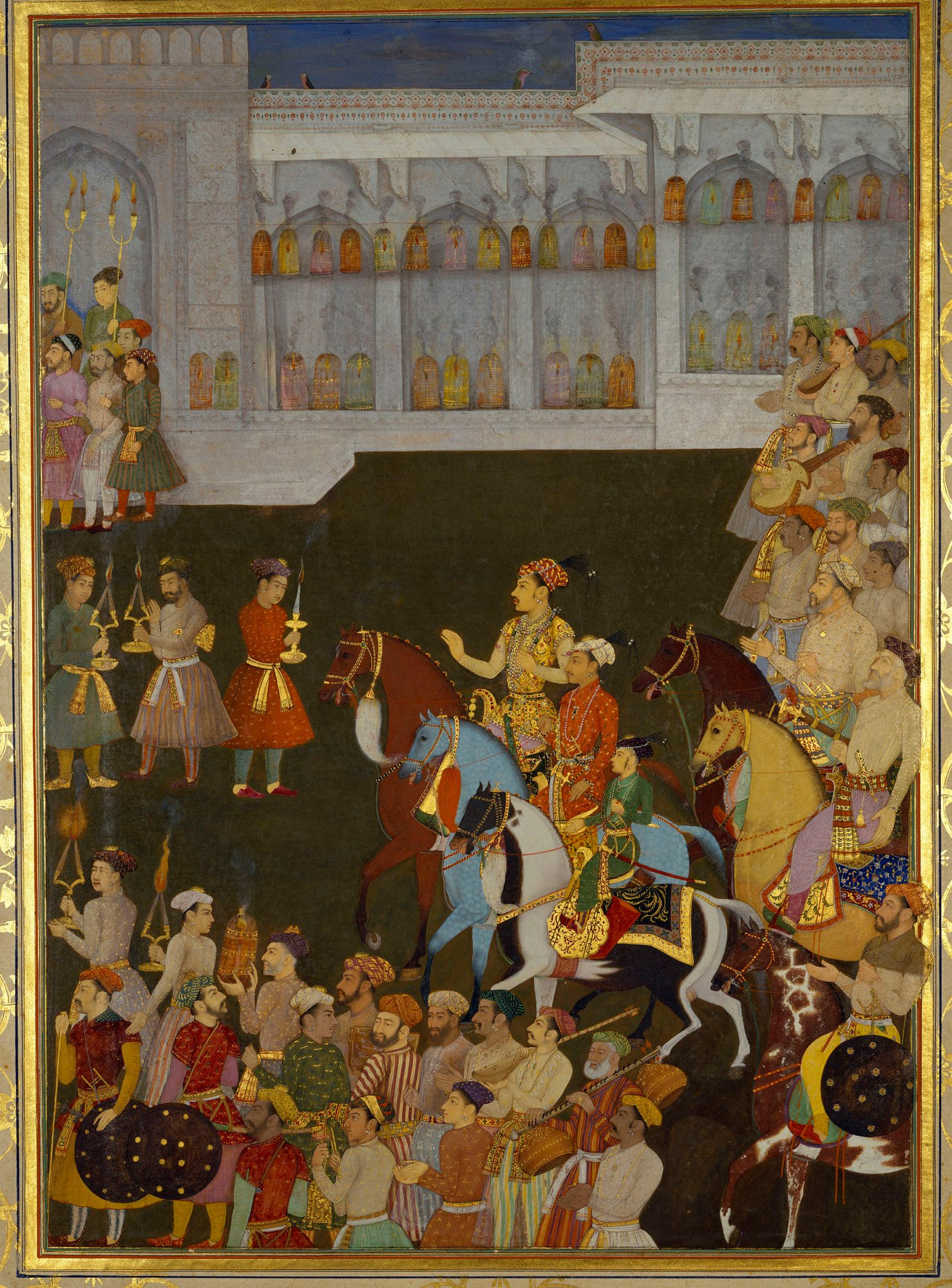
Prince Shah-Shuja’s barat wedding procession arriving at the Agra Fort on 4 March 1633. He is accompanied by his brothers princes Aurangzeb and Murad Baksh.

His third wife was the daughter of Raja Tamsen of Kishtwar. She was the mother of Shahzada Buland Akhtar, who was born in August 1645.

== Governor of Bengal ==
Shazada Muhammad Shah Shuja was appointed by Shah Jahan as the Subahdar of Bengal and Bihar from 1641 and of Orissa from 25 July 1648 until 1661. His father, Shah Jahan, appointed as his deputy, the Rajput prince of Nagpur, Kunwar Raghav Singh (1616-1671). During his governorship, he built the official residence, Bara Katra, in the capital Dhaka.

After the illness of Shah Jahan in September 1657, a power crisis occurred among the brothers. Shah Shuja proclaimed himself as Emperor, but Aurangzeb ascended the throne of Dehli and sent Mir Jumla to subjugate Shuja. Shuja was defeated in the Battle of Khajwa on 5 January 1659. He retreated, first to Tanda and then to Dhaka, on 12 April 1660. He left Dhaka on 6 May and boarded ships near present-day Bhulua on 12 May heading to Arakan. Mir Jumla reached Dhaka on 9 May 1660 and was then appointed by Aurangzeb as the next Subahdar of Bengal.

=== Construction projects in Dhaka ===
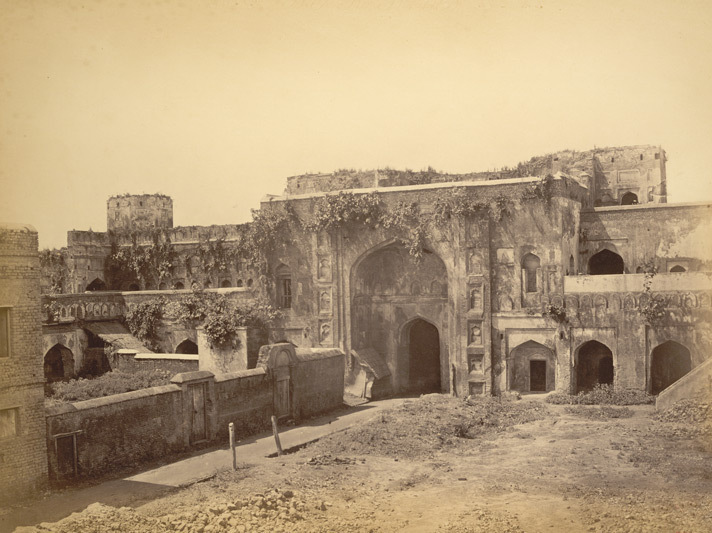
Bara Katra

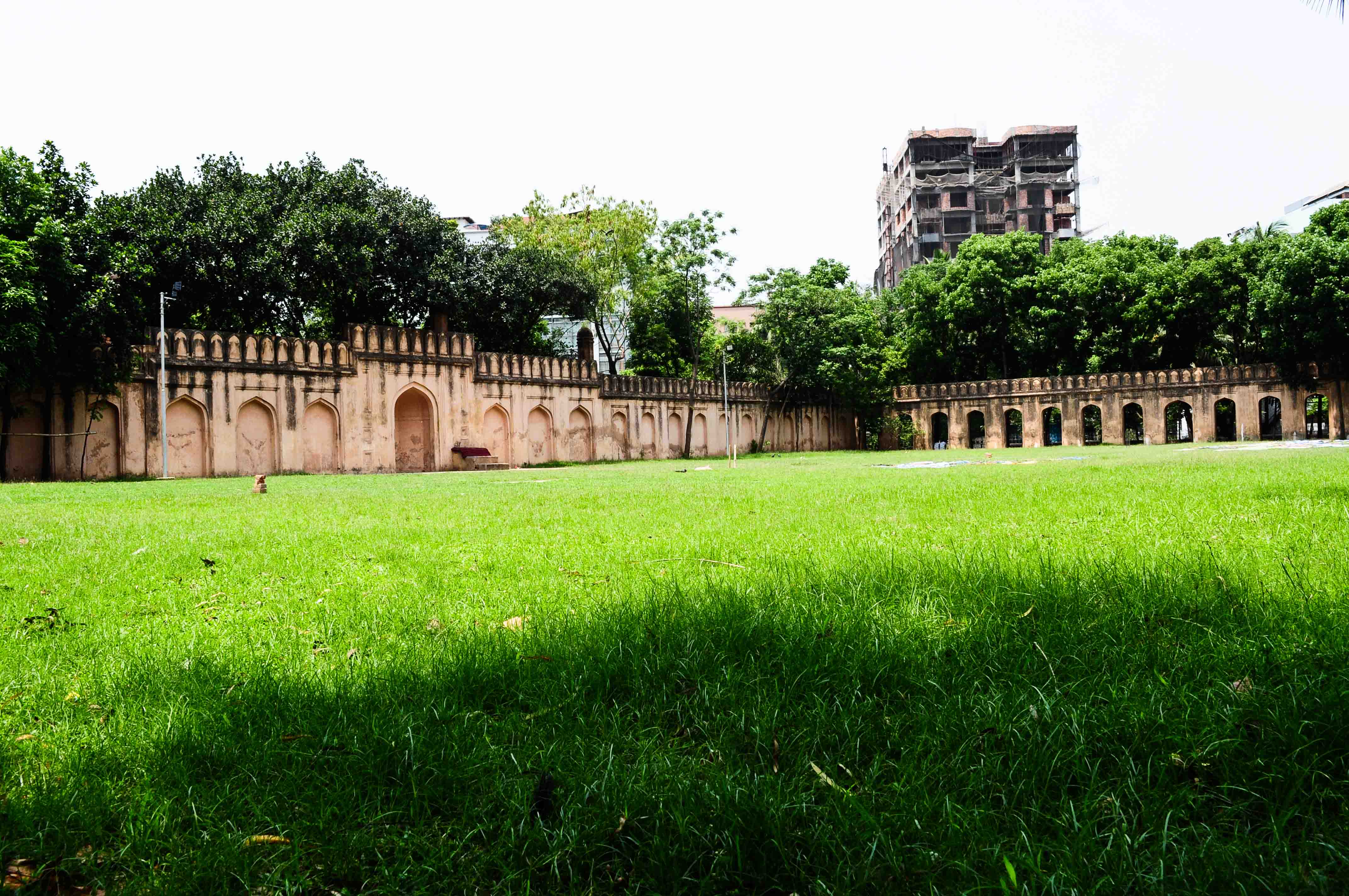
Dhanmondi Eidgah

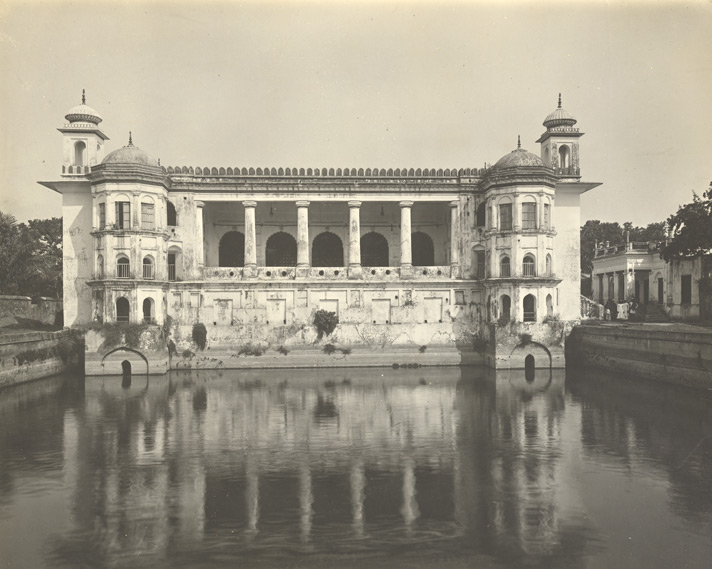
Hussaini Dalan

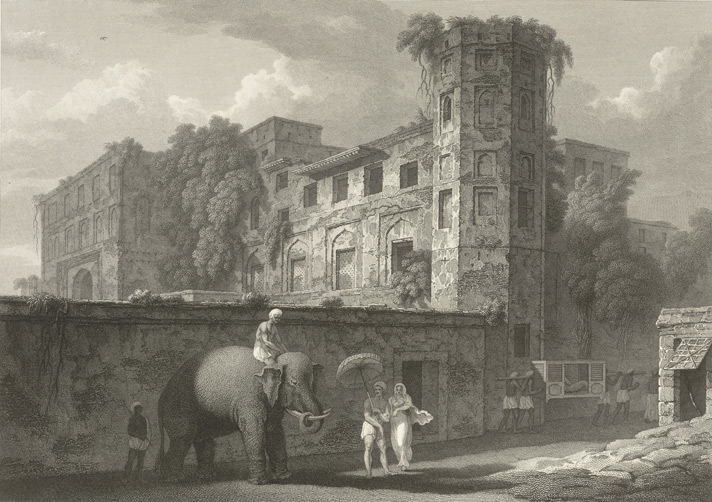
An etching of Bara Katra by Sir Charles D'Oyly in 1823

== Mughal war of succession ==
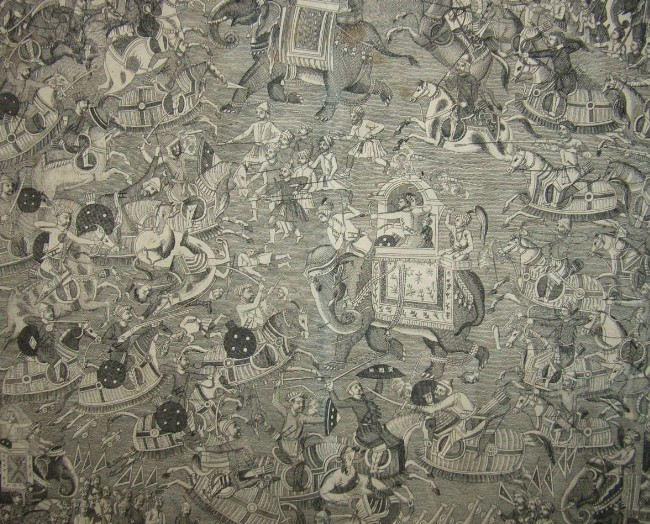
The Mughal armies of Aurangzeb and Shah Shuja confront each other.

When Shah Jahan fell ill, a struggle for the throne started among his four sons - Dara Shikoh, Shah Shuja, Aurangzeb and Murad Baksh. Shuja immediately crowned himself the emperor and took the imperial titles in November 1657. Out of the 22 nobles in the service of the prince Shah Shuja, 10 were Barha Sayyids. Indian Shi'as were his staunchest adherents. His coronation included adoption of the grandiose titles Abul Fauz Nasir-ud-din Muhammad, Timur II, Alexander III, Shah Shuja Bahadur Ghazi.

He marched with a large army, backed by a good number of war-boats in the river Ganges. However, he was beaten by Dara's army in the hotly contested Battle of Bahadurpur, near Banares (in modern Uttar Pradesh, India). Shuja turned back to Rajmahal to make further preparations. He signed a treaty with his elder brother, Dara, which left him in control of Bengal, Orissa and a large part of Bihar, on 17 May 1658.

In the meantime, Aurangzeb defeated Dara twice (at Dharmat and Samugarh), caught him, executed him on a charge of heresy and ascended the throne. Shuja marched to the capital again, this time against Aurangzeb. A battle took place on 5 January 1659 at the Battle of Khajwa (Fatehpur district, Uttar Pradesh, India), where Shuja was defeated.

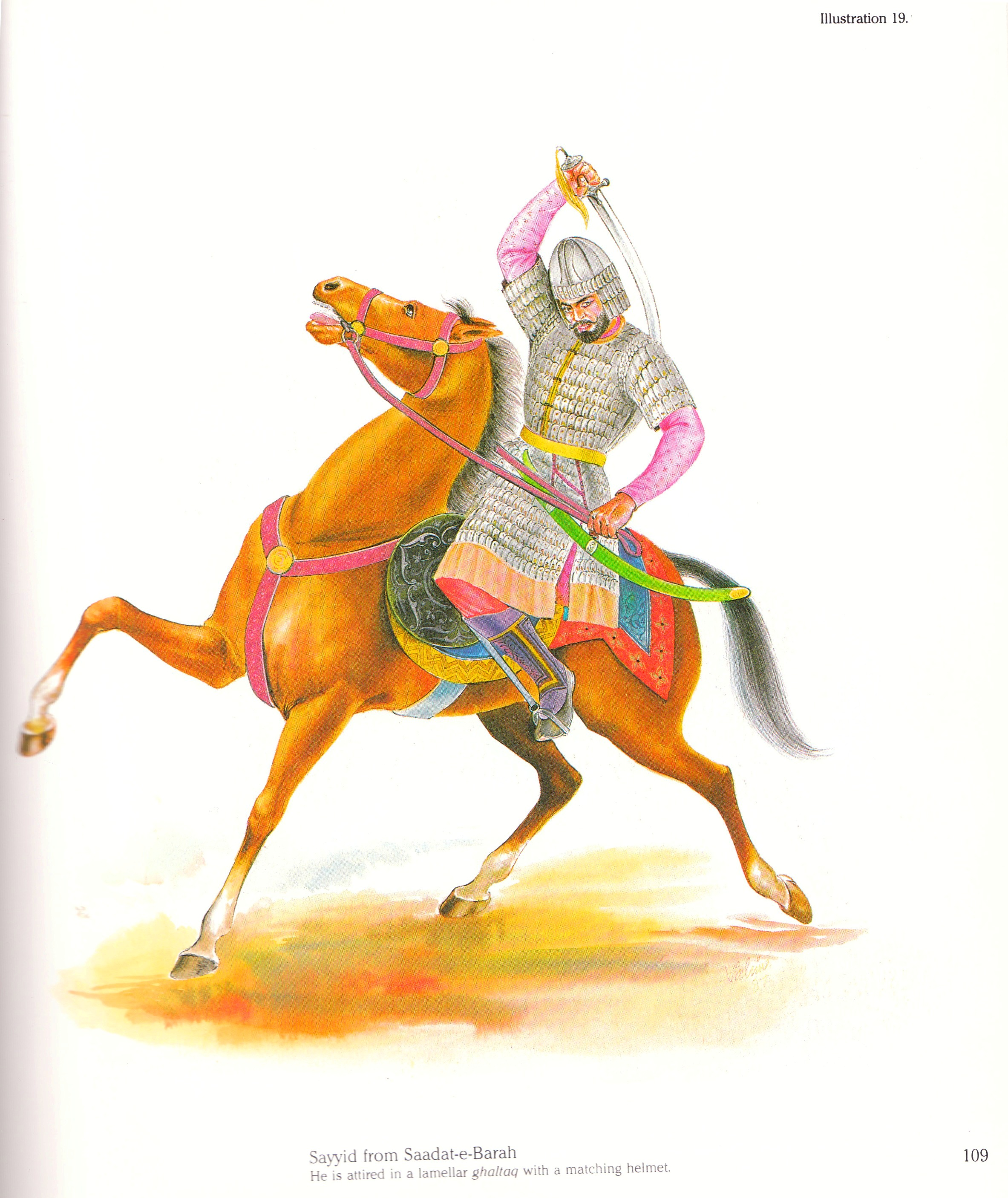
Sayyid from Saadat-e Barah

After his defeat, Shuja retreated towards Bengal. He was pursued by the imperial army under Mir Jumla. Shuja put up a good fight against them. However, he was finally defeated in the last battle in April 1660. After each defeat, he had to face desertions in his own army, but he did not lose heart. Rather, he reorganised the army with renewed vigor. But when he was surrounded at Tanda and found that reorganisation of the army was no longer possible, he decided to leave Bengal for good and take shelter in Arakan.

== Asylum in Arakan ==
=== En route to Arakan ===
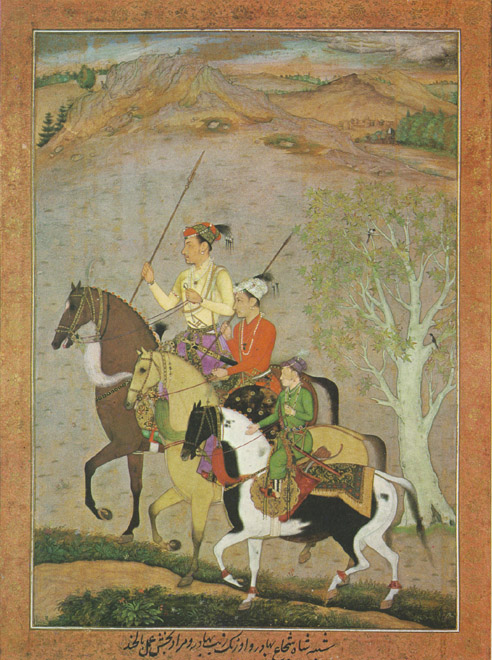
A painting from circa 1637 shows the brothers (left to right) Shuja, Aurangzeb and Murad Baksh in their younger years

Shuja left Tanda with his family and retinue in the afternoon of 6 April 1660 and reached Dhaka on 12 April. After staying for a month, they departed from the city and boarded Arakanese ships on 12 May at Bhulua (near present-day Noakhali, Bangladesh). The party first arrived at Chittagong and remained for some time. From here, they took the land route to Arakan, which is still called Shuja Road. Thousands of palanquins were used to carry Shuja's harem and he performed Eid prayers at an Eidgah in Dulahzara.

=== Death and aftermath ===
Shuja and his entourage arrived in Arakan on 26 August 1660, and were greeted at the capital, Mrauk U, with courtesy. The Arakanese king, the powerful Sanda Thudhamma, had previously agreed to provide ships for Shuja and his family to travel to Mecca, where the prince had planned to spend the remainder of his life. The half dozen camel-loads of gold and jewels that the Mughal royals had brought with them was beyond anything that had previously been seen in Arakan.

After eight months and numerous excuses, Sanda Thudhamma's promise of ships did not materialise. Finally, the latter demanded the hand of Shuja's daughter in marriage, which the prince refused. Sanda Thudhamma responded by ordering the Mughals to leave within three days. Unable to move and being refused provisions at the bazaars, Shuja resolved to attempt to overthrow the king. The prince had two hundred soldiers with him, as well as the support of the local Muslims, giving him a good chance at success. However, Sanda Thudhamma was forewarned of the coup attempt. Shuja was, therefore, forced to set fire to the city, hoping to cut his way out in the confusion. Much of his entourage was captured and though he himself initially escaped into the jungle, he was later captured and executed.

Shuja's wealth was taken and melted down by Sanda Thudhamma, who took the Mughal princesses into his harem. He married the eldest, an event that was subsequently celebrated in song and poetry. The following year however, suspicious of another coup, Sanda Thudhamma had Shuja's sons decapitated and his daughters (including the pregnant eldest) starved to death. Aurangzeb, angered by the deaths, ordered a campaign against the kingdom. After an intensive siege, the Mughals captured Chittagong and thousands of Arakanese were taken into slavery. Arakan was unable to return to its previous dominance and Sanda Thudhamma's eventual death was followed by a century of chaos.

== Ancestry ==
Ancestors of Shah Shuja (Mughal prince)

8. Jalal-ud-din Muhammad Akbar, Mughal Emperor
4. Nur-ud-din Muhammad Jahangir, Mughal Emperor
9. Mariam-uz-Zamani
2. Shahab-ud-din Muhammad Shah Jahan I, Mughal Emperor
10. Udai Singh, Raja of Marwar
5. Jagat Gosain
11. Manrang Devi of Gwalior
1. Shah Shuja
12. I'timad-ud-Daulah
6. Abu'l-Hasan Asaf Khan
13. Asmat Begam
3. Mumtaz Mahal
14. Ghias ud-din ‘Ali Asaf Khan
7. Diwanji Begum

== See also ==
- Battle of Khajwa
- History of Bengal
- Mughal Empire

== Bibliography ==
- Sarkar, Jadunath, ed. (1943). The History of Bengal. Vol. II: Muslim Period. Delhi: B.R. Publishing Corporation. ISBN 81-7646-239-X.
