= Azam Khan (Subahdar) =

Mughal grand vizier in 1628

Grand Vizier
- In office 1628–1628
- Monarch: Shah Jahan
- Preceded by: Wazir Khan
- Succeeded by: Afzal Khan Shirazi

20th Subahdar of Bengal
- In office 1632–1635
- Preceded by: Qasim Khan
- Succeeded by: Islam Khan II

Personal details
- Born: Missing required parameter 1=month! 1573 Sava, Iraq
- Died: 1649 (aged 75–76) Jaunpur

Mir Muhammad Baqir Iradat Khan (1573–1649), also known by his title Azam Khan, was a Mughal official who served as Subahdar of Bengal Subah from 1632 to 1635.

Azam Khan's real name was Mir Muhammad Baqir. He was originally from Iraq and came to Indian subcontinent during the reign of Jahangir. Jahangir appointed him as "Khan-i-Saman". Then, he was appointed as Subahdar of Kashmir. Later, he was appointed as Mir Bakhxi too. Shahjahan honoured him with the title "Azam Khan", and appointed him as Grand Wazir in 1628.

When Azam Khan was the ruler of Bengal, the English had warm relation with the authority. During his tenure, Bengal faced chaotic administrative and military situation, because Assamese King Pratap Singh made sporadic raids in Kamarupa. For this, he was removed from his post and Islam Khan II appointed as Subahdar of Bengal.

Azam Khan was then made the governor of Gujarat, and in 1641 marched against the zamindar of Jam who did not, like the other landholders, submit to his authority. He arrived at Nawanagar, the zamindar's seat. The Jam presented 100 Cutch horses and three lacs of mahmüdis and destroyed his mint where mahmudîs used to be coined,and waited upon him. He returned from there to Ahmadabad. After that he was made fief-holder of Mathura and built a serai and quarter there. After that he was made governor of Bihar, and in 1648 he was summoned to take charge of Kashmir. However, Azam represented that he could not stand the cold of that region, and he was appointed to Jaunpur in succession to Mirza Hasan Şafavi. In 1649, Azam Khan died at the age of 76. He was buried in a garden which he had constructed beforehand on the bank of the Gumti.

== Family ==
Azam Khan's daughter was married to Prince Shuja, and they had a son: Zainul Abedin, thus tying Azam Khan to the Mughal dynasty. Azam had three known sons: Multafat Khan, Mir Khalil Khan Zaman and Mir Ishaq Iradat Khan. All three brothers supported Aurangzeb in the Mughal war of succession of 1657–1658, and upon Aurangzeb's ascension were rewarded amply by the emperor. Multafat Khan, who had been the diwan of Bengal, was made Diwan of the Mughal empire, but died before taking his office. He was a son-in-law of Asad Ullah Khan Mamuri, Bakhshi of the Deccan, and had a son: Hoshdar Khan, who was the best shot of gun of his age, was made the governor of Delhi by Aurangzeb in 1663. He died leaving two sons: Kamgar and Jafar in 1673. Kamgar, who was renowned for being athletic and wrestling a crocodile in Chunar, died childless in Malwa while serving as the governor of Rai'sin fort.

His second son, Mir Khalil Khan Zaman, was a son-in-law of Asaf Khan, father of Empress Mumtaz Begum. He was reportedly the favorite son of his father. He was given Narnol as his faujdari, where he dug a tank called Khalil Sagar. Later he was made the governor of Dharar during Aurangzeb's viceroyalty of the deccan, and he was considered an honest officer by Aurangzeb. Khan Zaman was later made the governor of Burhanpur after Sambhaji's invasion, and died there in 1684. His sons did not achieve any high offices.

Iradat Khan, the third son of Azam Khan, had two wives: the first was the grandniece of Asaf Khan, father of Mumtaz Begum, thus a cousin of Aurangzeb; and the second was the daughter of Zahid Khan Koka, by whom he had two sons: Muhammad Jafar and Mir Mubarak Ullah, the faujdar of Konkan in Maharashtra. Mir Mubarak Ullah died during the reign of Farrukhsiyar, and was succeeded by his son, Mir Hidayat Ullah, entitled Hushiyar Khan. Hushiyar Khan changed his allegiance to the Nizams of Hyederabad, and was in return made governor of Gulbarga, and later, Diwan of the Hyederabad State. He also fought in the Trichinopally expedition by Asaf Jah II, and died in 1744. He was said to be "addicted to women" and had many children, and his son Hafiz Khan was serving as the governor of Gulbarga under the Nizams in 1775. Thus, Azam Khan's descendants became a part of the Hyederabadi nobility.
