= Majibul Haque Chowdhury =

Bangladeshi politician

Member of Bangladesh Parliament

Personal details
- Party: Jatiya Party (Ershad)

Majibul Haque Chowdhury is a Jatiya Party (Ershad) politician and a former member of parliament for Feni-3.

== Career ==
Chowdhury was elected to parliament from Feni-3 as a Jatiya Party (Ershad) candidate in 1986 and 1988.
