= Abdul Awal Mintoo =

Bangladeshi businessman and politician (born 1949)

- আবদুল আউয়াল মিন্টু
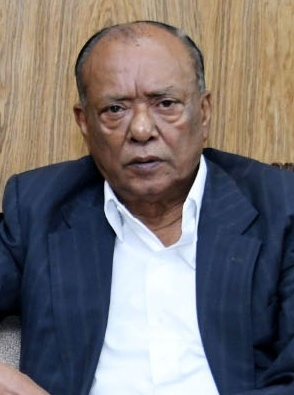
- Mintoo in 2026

Minister of Environment, Forest and Climate Change
- Incumbent
- Assumed office 17 February 2026
- Prime Minister: Tarique Rahman
- Preceded by: Syeda Rizwana Hasan

Member of Parliament
- Incumbent
- Assumed office 17 February 2026
- Preceded by: Masud Uddin Chowdhury
- Constituency: Feni-3

Personal details
- Born: 22 February 1949 (age 77) Feni District, East Bengal, Dominion of Pakistan
- Party: Bangladesh Nationalist Party
- Spouse: Nasreen Fatema Awal
- Children: 3 including Tabith Awal
- Education: Bangladesh Marine Academy,State University of New York Maritime College
- Occupation: Businessman, politician

Abdul Awal Mintoo (born 22 February 1949) is a Bangladeshi businessman and politician. He is the incumbent minister of environment, forest and climate change. He is the incumbent Jatiya Sangsad member representing the Feni-3 constituency since February 2026.

== Background and education ==
Mintoo was born in a village named Aleyarpur in Feni District. He passed SSC from Feni Government Pilot High School in 1964 and HSC from Comilla Victoria College in 1966. In 1968, he obtained a diploma in nautical science from Pakistan Marine Academy (now Bangladesh Marine Academy). He then earned a bachelor's degree in marine transportation science from the State University of New York Maritime College, following it up with a master's degree in transportation management and advance chartering problems and arbitration.

== Business career ==
Mintoo has been a director of National Bank Limited and General Insurance, the largest private general insurance company in the Bangladesh. He is the chairman of the marketing and sole distribution of Johnson & Johnson products in Bangladesh.

Mintoo was elected president of the Federation of Bangladesh Chambers of Commerce and Industry (FBCCI), the apex trade body of Bangladesh, in 2003.

Within the Bangladeshi manufacturing sector, Mintoo has been director of the Chittagong Cement Clinker Grinding Co. Ltd. (Heidelberg Cement) and an advisor to Dulamia Cotton Spinning Mills Ltd. He is also active in agricultural-based industries, having served as Chairman of OP and Hybrid Vegetable seeds production, processing and research and has also been active in the following organisations:

- Bangladesh India Chamber of Commerce and Industry (BICCI) Chairman
- Bangladesh Association of Banks (BAB) Member, Executive Committee
- Bangladesh Seed Merchants Association Adviser
- Bangladesh Seed Dealers Association Chief Adviser
- Bangladesh Employer's Federation President (1997–1999)
- Bangladesh Ocean Going Ship Owners Association chairman (1988–2000)
- Bangladesh Marine Fisheries Association EC Member (1992–1995)
- Bangladesh Textile Mills Association EC Member (1995–1996)
- Islamic Ship Owners Association (Jeddah) EC Member (1988–2000)
- Bangladesh Garments Manufacturers & Exporters Association (BGMEA) Member, Council of Adviser

Mintoo has also been active in hotel groups in Bangladesh and has been a member of the Board of Governors, Academy for Planning and Development, Ministry of Planning, the Dhaka Stock Exchange (DSE) and the Bangladesh Olympic Association. He is a member of the National Bank Foundation and founded several colleges in Bangladesh including Iqbal Memorial College, Bodarernessa High School and Alhaj Safiullah High School. He is also a member of the Board of Governors, at Bangladesh Open University (BOU) and at the Bangladesh Institute of Management.

== Political career ==
Mintoo is a senior leader of the Bangladesh Nationalist Party (BNP), one of the major political parties in Bangladesh. He has served as Vice Chairman of the party and has been involved in national political activities and policy advocacy.

On 12 February 2026, Mintoo won the 2026 Bangladeshi general election contesting at the Feni-3 constituency securing 1,57,425 votes while his nearest opponent Bangladesh Jamaat-e-Islami candidate Mohammad Fakhruddin received 1,08,160 votes.

== Personal life ==
Mintoo is married to Nasreen Fatema Awal. Nasreen is the founding president of the Women Entrepreneurs Association of Bangladesh (WEAB) and has been serving as the honorary consul general of Mongolia to Bangladesh since November 2024. They have three sons, Tabith Awal, Tafsir Awal and Tajwar Awal. 2017 Paradise Papers named all the family members.
