= Rahim Ullah =

Bangladeshi politician

Member of Parliament

Member of the Bangladesh Parliament for Feni-3
- In office 5 January 2014 – 7 January 2019
- Preceded by: Mosharraf Hossain Fulgazia
- Succeeded by: Masud Uddin Chowdhury

Personal details
- Born: 1 March 1958 (age 68) Feni, Noakhali District, East Pakistan
- Party: Awami League

Rahim Ullah (Bengali: রহিম উল্লাহ; born 1 March 1958) is a Bangladeshi politician and the former member of parliament from Feni-3 constituency.

== Early life ==
Rahim Ullah was born on 1 March 1958, to a Bengali Muslim family in Feni, Noakhali District, East Pakistan.

== Career ==
Ullah was elected to Parliament from Feni-3 in 2014 Bangladesh General Election. He beat Anwarul Karim of the Jatiya Party in the election. He is the president of Bangladesh Awami League unit of Jeddah. He is a political rival of Nizam Hazari, fellow Bangladesh Awami League politician and member of parliament from Feni. On 7 February 2016 his motorcarade was attacked in Feni by Bangladesh Jubo League and Bangladesh Chhatra League. The attack was believed to be a fallout from his rivalry with Nizam Hazari.

Following the fall of the Sheikh Hasina-led Awami League government, Ullah was detained from Dhanmondi in October 2024. His home in Feni was attacked, looted, and burned down on 19 November 2026.
