= Rahimullah Choudhury =

Bengali industrialist and politician

- রহিমুল্লাহ চৌধুরী

Member of the National Assembly of Pakistan
- In office 1965–1969
- President: Ayub Khan, Yahya Khan
- Preceded by: Muhammad Shehabulah
- Constituency: Noakhali-I

Personal details
- Born: Daganbhuiyan, Feni, Noakhali District, Bengal Presidency

Rahimullah Choudhury (Bengali: রহিমুল্লাহ চৌধুরী) was a Bengali industrialist and politician. He was a member of the 4th National Assembly of Pakistan as a representative of East Pakistan.

== Early life ==
Choudhury was born into a Bengali Muslim family of Choudhuries in Daganbhuiyan, Feni, which was then part of the Bengal Presidency's Noakhali District. The Chowdhuries of the area were related to each other, including Hamidul Huq Chowdhury, Foreign Minister of Pakistan, and Saber Hossain Chowdhury, an Awami League politician

== Career ==
Choudhury was a member of the 4th National Assembly of Pakistan as an independent , from the Noakhali-I constituency.
