= Masud Uddin Chowdhury =

Bangladeshi politician

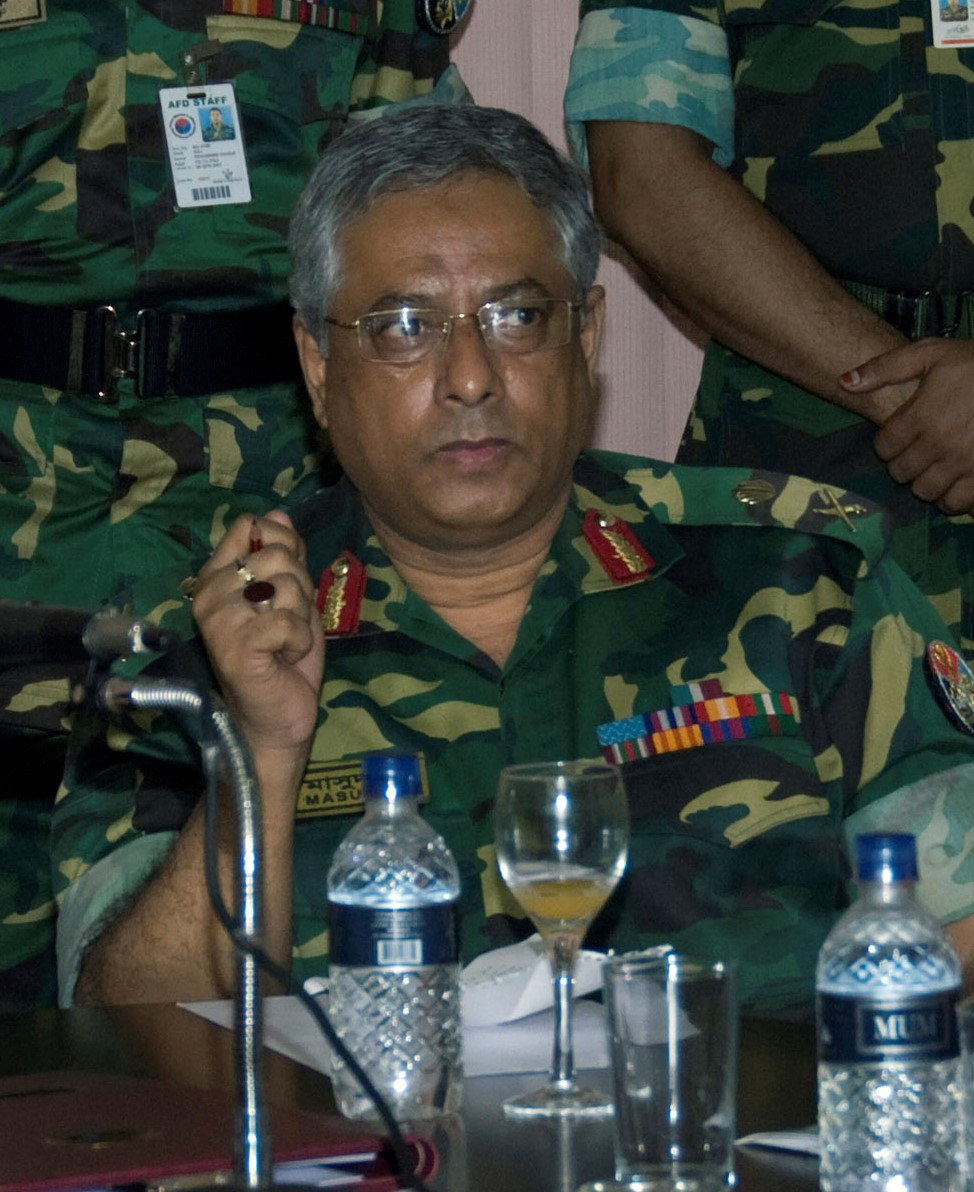
- Chowdhury in 2007

Member of the Bangladesh Parliament for Feni-3
- In office 30 January 2019 – 6 August 2024
- Preceded by: Rahim Ullah

Principal Staff Officer of Armed Forces Division
- In office 5 June 2007 – 2 June 2008
- President: Iajuddin Ahmed
- Prime Minister: Fakhruddin Ahmed (acting)
- Preceded by: Jahangir Alam Chowdhury
- Succeeded by: Abdul Mubeen

Chief Coordinator Of the National Coordination Committee Against Corruption and Crime
- In office 2007–2008

Personal details
- Born: 30 June 1954 (age 71) Sonagazi, East Bengal, Pakistan
- Spouse: Jasmin Masud
- Relatives: Sayeed Iskander (brother-in-law)
- Education: M.D.S (NU), Postgraduation

Military service
- Allegiance: Bangladesh
- Branch/service: Bangladesh Army; Jatiya Rakkhi Bahini
- Years of service: 1972–2008
- Rank: Lieutenant General
- Commands: GOC of 9th Infantry Division; GOC of 33rd Infantry Division; PSO of Armed Force Division
- Battles/wars: Bangladesh Liberation War

Masud Uddin Chowdhury (Bengali: মাসুদ উদ্দিন চৌধুরী; born 30 June 1954) is a retired three star general of the Bangladesh Army and a politician of the Jatiya Party. A former National Defence Force operative, Chowdhury served as former chief coordinator of the National Coordination Committee on Combating Corruption and Crime during the second Hasina ministry.

== Early life ==
Chowdhury was born on 30 June 1954 to a Bengali family of Muslim Chowdhuries in the village of Sulakhali in Sonagazi, Feni, then part of the Noakhali district of East Bengal.

== Career ==
Chowdhury was an officer of the Jatiya Rakkhi Bahini and was made a Bangladesh Army officer after the Jatiya Rakhi Bahini was absorbed into the army.

Chowdhury was appointed as chief of counter intelligence bureau of the Directorate General of Forces Intelligence in 2003 by the Bangladesh Nationalist Party government.

Chowdhury served as a principal staff officer of the Bangladesh Armed Forces Division. He also served as the general officer commanding (GOC) of 9 Infantry Division and area commander of the Savar area and GOC 33 Infantry Division and area commander of the Comilla area. In 2007, he was the chief coordinator of the National Coordination Committee on Combating Corruption and Crime during the caretaker government rule during the 2006–2008 Bangladeshi political crisis. He attended the 10th Annual Asia-Pacific Chiefs of Defence conference in the United States. Tarique Rahman, son of former prime minister Khaleda Zia, told United States diplomat Geeta Pasi that he was tortured on the orders of Chowdhury in military custody. Pasi reported it was surprising, as Chowdhury was believed to have been close to Zia's Bangladesh Nationalist Party.

In June 2007, Chowdhury was promoted to lieutenant general and appointed as the principal staff officer of the Armed Forces Division. Later he served at the National Defence College. Chowdhury was the high commissioner for Bangladesh to Australia from June 2008 to 2014. He founded the Picasso restaurant in Dhaka.

In 2017, Chowdhury filed a case under section-57 of the Information and Communication Technology Act, 2006 against Afsan Chowdhury.

Chowdhury became the member of parliament for Feni-3 in 2018 and again in 2024 by Jatiya Party ticket with the support of Awami League.

Chowdhury is the president of Baridhara Cosmopolitan Club Limited. He was re-elected president of the club in 2018.

Following the fall of the Sheikh Hasina-led Awami League government, Chowdhury's home in Feni was burned down and vandalized in February 2025.

== Arrest ==
On 24 March 2026, Chowdhury was detained by police detectives in a late-night raid on his home in Dhaka led by Detective Branch Chief Shafiqul Islam.

== Personal life ==
Chowdhury's brother-in-law, Sayeed Iskander, was the brother of a former prime minister, Khaleda Zia.
