= Rice production in Bangladesh =

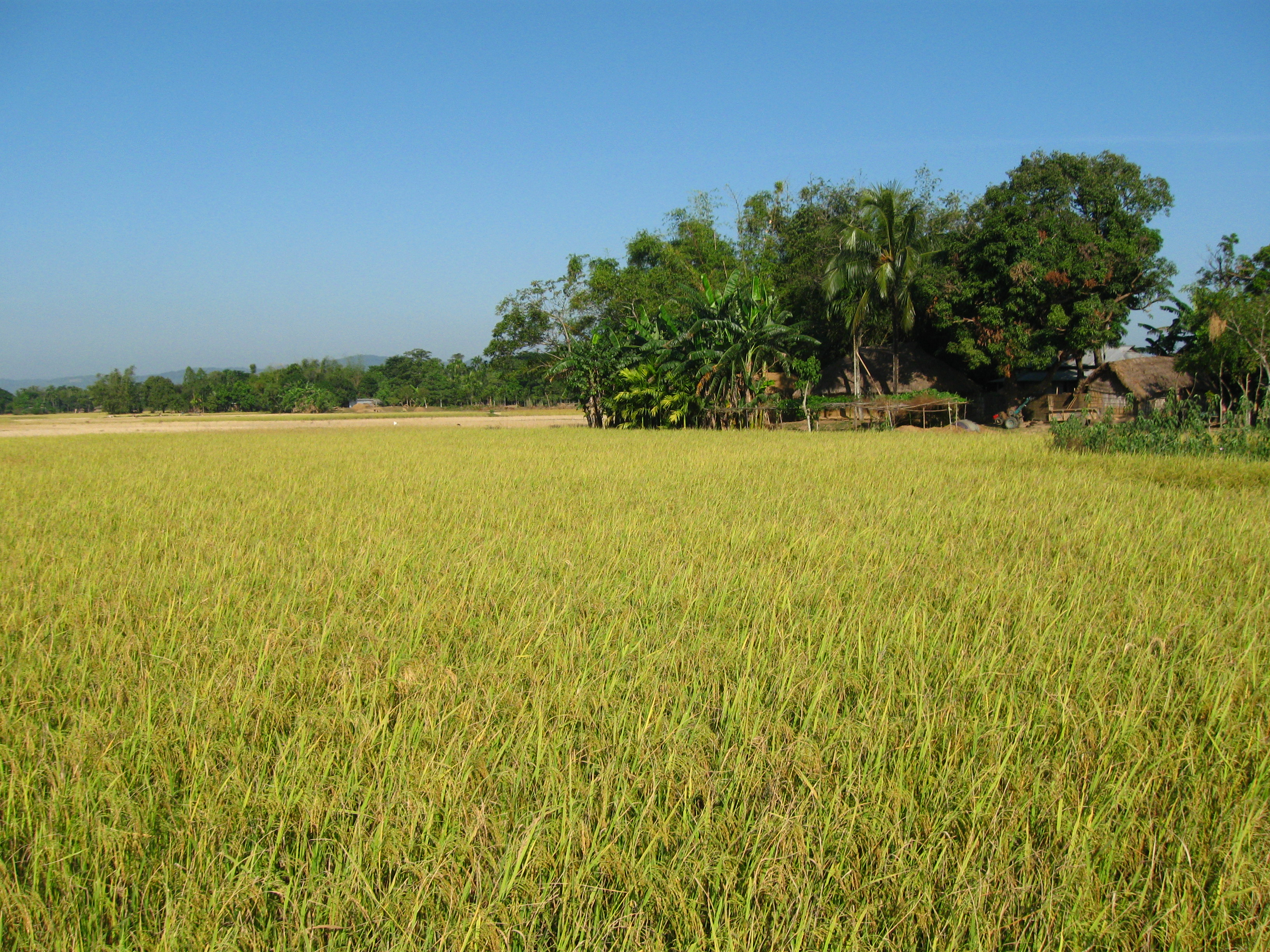
Paddy field in rural Bangladesh

Rice production in Bangladesh plays a critical role in the nation's economy, affecting various sectors and socioeconomic factors. As the primary crop and staple food, rice is central to agricultural production, employment, and nutritional needs. It is a major contributor to Bangladesh’s national income. With a production of approximately 39.1 million tonnes in 2023, Bangladesh is the third-largest rice producer globally.

Rice is cultivated in three seasons in Bangladesh: aman, aush, and boro. Boro is the leading paddy production crop, heavily reliant on irrigation and fertilisers, followed by aman and aush. Limited mechanisation and climate change hamper the productivity of rice production compared to neighbouring countries. However, the government has been undertaking efforts to increase productivity by developing new high-yielding rice varieties.

== History ==
Domesticated rice cultivation in the Bengal region traces back approximately 4,000 years. Through a process of "artificial selection," ancient farmers developed numerous rice landraces, finely tuned to local environmental conditions. Most of these varieties, classified as Indica group (O. sativa), were cultivated in eastern India and Bangladesh. Additionally, a smaller quantity of Japonica rice was grown, particularly in deep-water regions. While the precise count of rice varieties before the Green Revolution remains uncertain, it's estimated that around 15,000 folk landraces thrived in Bengal during the 1940s.

The Green Revolution of the 1960s was a pivotal era for Bangladesh's agriculture, significantly enhancing rice production using high-yield varieties. This period was marked by a notable increase in rice output. In the following decade, the Bangladesh Rice Research Institute (BRRI) was established, releasing its first variety, BR1, and laying the groundwork for future advancements in rice breeding. Later, it introduced a high-yielding rice variety known as BR3, which quickly proliferated nationwide, becoming the staple crop across all three cropping seasons of Aus, Aman, and Boro, hence earning the moniker "BR-revolution." Subsequent iterations of rice varieties replaced earlier ones in the following decades, with more than 7,000 traditional rice varieties being replaced by modern, high-yielding counterparts, leading to significant improvements in rice production nationwide. Presently, data suggests that just over 700 rice varieties are actively cultivated in Bangladesh.

Bangladesh's rice production demonstrated a generally increasing trajectory during the 1980s, with the exception of fiscal year 1981. However, the yearly production increases were modest, barely keeping pace with population growth. A milestone was achieved in fiscal year 1986 when rice output surpassed 15 million tonnes for the first time. Despite being the fourth largest global rice producer in the mid-1980s, Bangladesh's rice productivity was low compared to other Asian countries, such as Malaysia and Indonesia, during that period.

By the end of the 20th century, the BRRI had expanded its repertoire to include varieties tailored to the nation's distinct rice-growing seasons, particularly Aman and Boro, further solidifying rice's status in the agricultural sector. From 2001 onwards, the BRRI's extensive trials across various locations have been instrumental in gauging both genetic improvements and environmental influences on rice yields. By 2020, the integration of both traditional and modern rice varieties had led to rice becoming the preeminent crop, dominating a substantial portion of Bangladesh's agricultural landscape. Around the same time, researchers at the BRRI have achieved early success in developing some of the country's first gene-edited rice lines. These lines are anticipated to exhibit effective resistance against diseases such as blast disease, insect pests like the brown planthopper (BPH), and abiotic stresses resulting from high soil salinity. The development of these gene-edited rice varieties represents a biotechnological advancement aimed at enhancing the resilience and productivity of rice cultivation in Bangladesh. Facing the ongoing challenges of climate change, urbanisation, and a burgeoning population, Bangladesh continues to prioritize the advancement of rice breeding to maintain food security and agricultural sustainability.

=== Exporting ===
In the fiscal year 2009–10, Bangladesh commenced exporting aromatic rice, with shipments amounting to 663 tonnes. Over subsequent years, the volume of exports increased significantly, reaching 10,879 tonnes in fiscal year 2019–20.

Efforts were made in 2012 to commence the export of non-aromatic rice due to surplus but failed as the rice was deemed unfit for export. Later, in 2014, Bangladesh initiated the export of 50,000 tonnes of non-fragrant coarse rice to Sri Lanka for the first time under a government-to-government deal, priced at $450 per tonne, driven by strong output and ample government stocks. However, further export initiatives were not pursued due to significant rice imports in that and the preceding year.

In 2022, the government imposed restrictions on rice exports, including various varieties of aromatic rice, due to concerns about the country's food situation.

== Significance ==
Rice is synonymous with food security in Bangladesh, serving as the primary crop and the main staple food for its population. It accounts for 97 percent of total food grain production and is crucial for the nation's nutrition, providing around 60 percent of total calories and 50 percent of protein intake for adults.

The crop's significance extends beyond nutrition, as nearly 48 percent of rural workers are involved in rice production, contributing approximately 16 percent to the overall gross domestic product (GDP) of the country and about 70 percent to agricultural GDP. Its significance in the economy is immense, both at the macro and micro levels, considering factors such as production volume, employment, trade, processing, food security, and nutrition. Additionally, its substantial weight in the consumer price index (CPI) can have significant effects on prices, inflation, and poverty.

Rice cultivation occupies about 76 percent of the total cropped area, spanning approximately 10,500,000 hectares (105,000 km^{2}) of land over 13 million farms. This illustrates rice's central role in Bangladesh's economy, agriculture, and food security.

As of 2023, Bangladesh ranks as the third-largest producer of rice globally, trailing behind China and India. According to the Bangladesh Bureau of Statistics, rice production in Bangladesh reached about 39.1 million tonnes in the fiscal year 2022–23 (FY23), while rice imports were around 1.05 million tonnes, a notable decline from 2.65 million tonnes in 2021.

== Cropping seasons ==
There are two rainy season rice crops, called Aman and Aush, and one dry-season crop called Boro.

=== Aman ===
Aman (Bengali: আমন) paddy is the second-largest cereal crop cultivated in Bangladesh, following Boro paddy. It is typically planted between July and August and harvested between November and December. Aman paddy relies entirely on rainfall and covers the largest acreage among rice crops.

Aman paddy is primarily grown in two ways. Some Aman rice is sown in spring using the broadcast method (Bengali: বোনা আমন, romanized: bona aman, lit. 'broadcast Aman'), maturing during the summer rains and being harvested in autumn. Another, more productive method involves starting the seeds in special beds and transplanting them during the summer monsoon season (Bengali: রোপা আমন, romanized: ropa aman, lit. 'transplanted Aman'). Broadcast Aman rice is predominantly grown in the southern and southeastern regions of the country.

=== Aush ===
The second harvest, known as Aush or Aus (Bengali: আউশ), typically involves traditional strains of rice but increasingly includes high-yielding, dwarf varieties. Rice for the Aus harvest is sown in March or April, benefiting from the April and May rains, maturing during the summer rainfall, and being harvested during the summer season.

=== Boro ===
With the increasing use of irrigation, there has been a growing emphasis on another rice-growing season extending into the dry season. This season, known as Boro (Bengali: বোরো), involves planting rice from mid-November to February and harvesting it from April to June. There are three types of Boro rice: Local Boro, High Yielding Variety (HYV) Boro, and Hybrid Boro. Currently, Boro rice is the leading paddy production crop. The cost of producing HYV Boro rice is relatively high due to the intensive use of expensive inputs such as irrigation and fertiliser. However, following the green revolution, it has gained significance due to its higher yields.

== Challenges and shortcomings ==
=== Pests ===
Annual rice production in Bangladesh suffers significant losses, ranging from 4 percent to 14 percent, due to various insect pests. Two prominent diseases have emerged as severe threats to rice crops: bacterial leaf blight (BLB) and ufra disease caused by the nematode D. angustus. Despite the severity of these diseases, the availability of technologies conferring resistance against pests and diseases remains limited, making rice production vulnerable to weather and pest outbreaks.

=== Market manipulation ===
In 2021, Bangladesh faced soaring rice prices despite abundant production and increased imports. However, prices remained high as some major market players hoarded rice, driving up prices. This situation particularly impacted farmers and the working class. In response, the government imported 1.35 million tonnes of rice in the 2020–21 financial year at reduced tariffs to stabilize prices. Unfortunately, this strategy has yet to effectively lower retail prices due to ongoing market distortions.

=== Poor supply chain planning ===
Bangladesh continues to import rice through public and private enterprises despite having a significant surplus, even when accounting for non-human consumption factors such as livestock feed, seed, milling loss, warehouse damages, and pre- and post-harvest losses. Experts attribute this issue to the lack of reliable data, criticizing government agencies for inconsistencies. This discrepancy has created a gap between actual demand and supply, often exploited by actors within the supply chain.

=== Environmental issues ===
Research indicates that in 2018, Bangladesh was ranked 7th among the top 20 rice-producing countries in terms of methane (CH_{4}) emissions from rice cultivation. In the context of total greenhouse gas (GHG) emissions from rice cultivation, Bangladesh was ranked 6th among the top 20 rice-producing countries, with total GHG emissions measured at 9903.03 kg CO_{2} equivalent per hectare. This ranking specifically pertains to the overall GHG emissions, which include not only methane (CH_{4}) but potentially other gases such as nitrous oxide (N_{2}O) from fertiliser use and carbon dioxide (CO_{2}) from various agricultural practices.

The delayed onset of monsoon rains and occasional heatwaves during the Aus season in certain years exacerbate productivity losses further. Reports indicate that farmers' profits from rice cultivation are dwindling due to rising input costs, including seeds, fertilisers, herbicides, and pesticides. Additionally, the high cost of labour and increased supplemental irrigation use due to delayed rainfall contribute to the challenges faced by farmers.

=== Limited mechanisation ===
Experts point out that while Bangladesh has made remarkable progress in rice production, there remains a considerable gap in productivity, with the growth rate stagnating at around 1%, compared to higher rates in neighbouring countries. Climate change poses a significant challenge, leading to large swaths of arable land remaining uncultivated. Scientists say that the agriculture sector must embark on a transformation, involving the mechanisation of the rice production process. The absence of domestically manufactured high-quality agricultural machinery poses a notable obstacle in the agricultural sector. This challenge is particularly evident in the limitations faced in fully producing larger machines such as threshers, planters, and combine harvesters. Furthermore, access to financial opportunities for farmers adds to the complexity of addressing these limitations.

Future challenges facing the agriculture sector include increased humidity causing new diseases, changing climate patterns with decreased rainfall and prolonged winters, rising temperatures, higher sea levels, and growing salinity, all contributing to the productivity lag.

== See also ==
- Bangladesh Rice Research Institute
- Agriculture in Bangladesh
