= D. africanus =

D. africanus may refer to:

- Dimorphognathus africanus, a frog species
- Ditylenchus africanus, the peanut pod nematode, a plant pathogenic species

== See also ==
- Africanus (disambiguation)
