= Climate change in Bangladesh =

Emissions, effects and responses of Bangladesh related to climate change

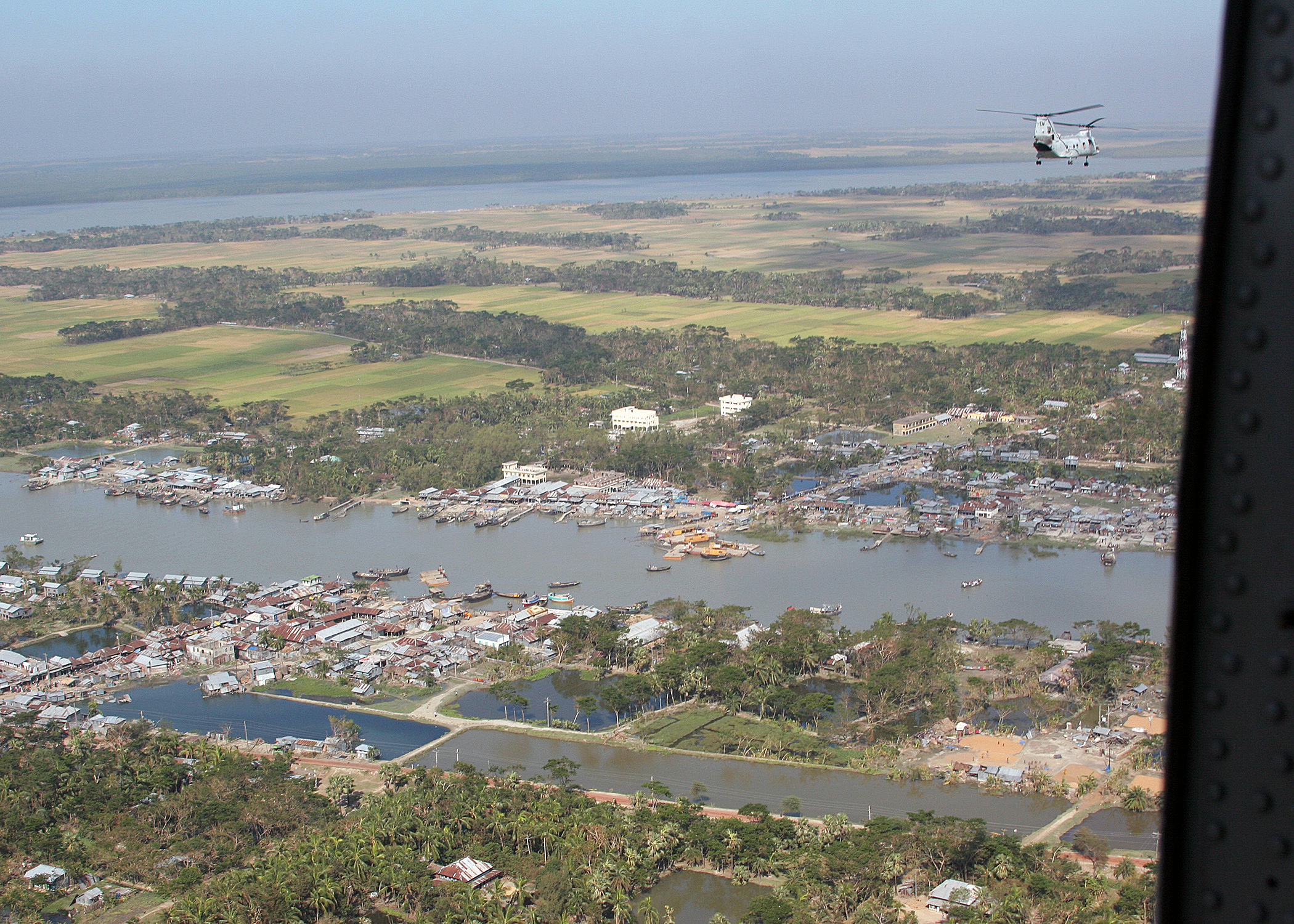
An aerial view of damage to villages and infrastructure following Cyclone Sidr, which swept into southern Bangladesh in 2007.

Climate change is a critical issue in Bangladesh. The country is one of the most vulnerable to the effects of climate change. In the 2020 edition of Germanwatch's Climate Risk Index, it ranked seventh in the list of countries most affected by climate calamities during the period 1999–2018. Bangladesh's vulnerability to the effects of climate change is due to a combination of geographical factors, such as its flat, low-lying, and delta-exposed topography and socio-economic factors, including its high population density, levels of poverty, and dependence on agriculture. The impacts and potential threats include sea level rise, temperature rise, food crisis, droughts, floods, and cyclones. Bangladesh has established a set of actions for climate mitigation and adaptation that includes reducing greenhouse gas emissions, supporting renewable energy projects, increasing forest cover, and planning response to disaster risks (p. 9).

Natural hazards that come from increased rainfall, rising sea levels, and tropical cyclones are expected to increase as the climate changes, each seriously affecting agriculture, water and food security, human health, and shelter.

Sea levels in Bangladesh are predicted to rise by up to 0.30 metres by 2050, resulting in the displacement of 0.9 million people, and by up to 0.74 metres by 2100, resulting in the displacement of 2.1 million people.

To address the sea level rise threat in Bangladesh, the Bangladesh Delta Plan 2100 was launched in 2018. The Government of Bangladesh is working on a range of specific climate change adaptation strategies, which play a crucial role in fostering the country's development. As of 2020, it was seen falling short of most of its initial targets, still leaving 80 million people at risk of flooding where it should have been reduced to 60 million people. The progress is being monitored.

== Greenhouse gas emissions ==
As a Least developed country (LDC), Bangladesh has not been subject to binding greenhouse gas (GHG) emission reduction commitments under earlier international climate agreements because of its development status. Nevertheless, rapid economic growth, industrialization, urbanization, and increasing energy demand have contributed to rising GHG emissions in recent decades, prompting the government to adopt mitigation measures alongside its adaptation policies.

== Effects on the natural environment ==
Bangladesh is known for its vulnerability to climate change and more specifically to natural disasters. It is important to mention the fact that the location of the country is vulnerable for the presence for three powerful rivers, Asian rivers, Brahmaputra, Ganges and the Meghna along with their numerous tributaries that could result massive floods. Bangladesh is prone to flooding and waterlogging because of its location as a river delta.

=== Temperature and weather changes ===
Köppen climate classification map for Bangladesh for 1980–2016

2071–2100 map under the most intense climate change scenario. Mid-range scenarios are currently considered more likely

=== Extreme weather events and natural disasters ===
From a prehistoric age, Bangladesh has faced numerous natural disasters in every decade but due to climate change, the intensity and extremity of disasters has increased. The country experiences small to medium scale floods, cyclones, flash floods, and landslides almost every year. Between 1980 and 2008, it experienced 219 natural disasters. Flood is the most common form of disaster in Bangladesh. The country was affected by six major floods in the 19th century and 18 floods in the 20th century. Among them, 1987, 1985 and 1998 were the most catastrophic. Major cyclones that occurred in the 20th century were in the years 1960, 1961, 1963, 1970, 1985, 1986, 1988, 1991, 1995. The cyclone in 1991 killed an estimated 140,000 people and 10 million people lost their homes. In the recent past, the country faced two major cyclones in 2007 and 2009. Coastal embankments were damaged and washed away during Cyclone Amphan in 2020, allowing the storm surge to flood up to 15 km inland and forcing 500,000 families from their home.

The geographic location of Bangladesh makes it highly prone to natural disasters. Situated in between the intersection of Himalayan mountains in the North and the Bay of Bengal in the South, the country experiences 2 completely different environmental conditions leading to long monsoons and catastrophic natural disasters. With new phenomena like climate change and the rise of sea levels, the situation is getting even worse. The country is also very low and flat, having only 10% of its land more than a meter above sea level. Being crisscrossed by hundreds of rivers, and having one of the largest river systems in the whole world (the estuarial region of Padma, Meghna and Brahmaputra rivers), Bangladesh frequently experiences gigantic cyclones and floods.

The Bangladesh Coastal Zone (BCZ) is highly vulnerable to tropical cyclones and subsequent storm surges, which are projected to increase in frequency and intensity in Bangladesh due to climate change. The area covers 47,201 km^{2} with 19 districts and was home to approximately 37.2 million in 2011 and 43.8 million at present (2022). The BCZ lags behind other parts of the country in socioeconomic development and struggles to cope with natural disasters and the gradual deterioration of the environment.

Floods have a destructive power over the whole state of the country and it is directly related to the effects of climate change. As estimated by UNICEF more than 19 million children in Bangladesh will be threatened by this situation.

Modelling work in 2022 showed only a very small poverty exposure bias (which is when poorer populations may suffer disproportionately from disasters) of potentially flooded households when compared to non-flooded households in the coastal zones. This is in contrast to some of the literature in Bangladesh that did find an exposure bias for river flooding. This could be explained from the random nature of cyclones which makes the occurrence of an exposure bias less likely, as it less dependent on long-term structural conditions that might determine the location of a household (e.g. land prices).

There was a heatwave in 2024.

=== Sea level rise ===
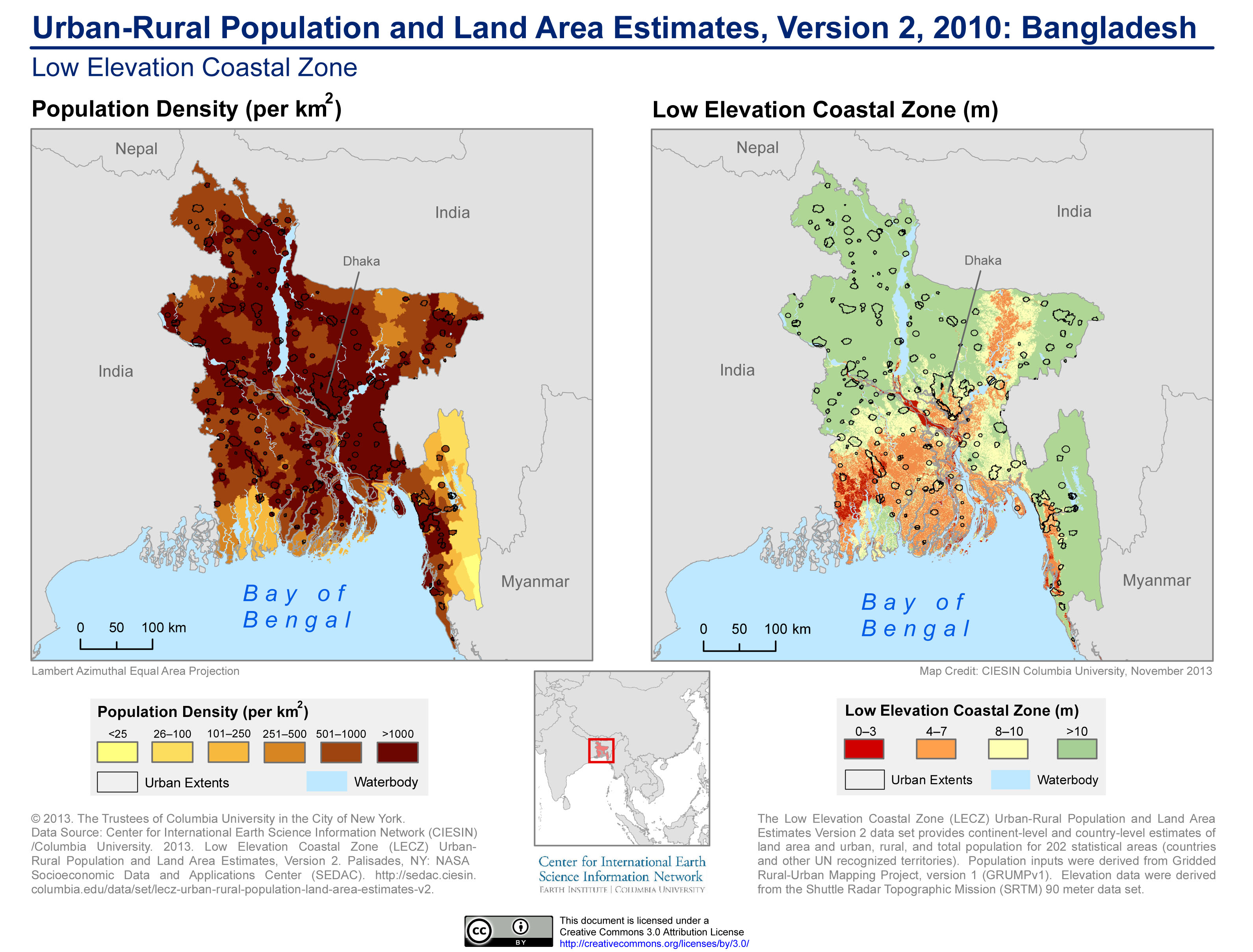
Population density and height above sea level in Bangladesh (2010)

Low-lying coastal regions, such as Bangladesh, are vulnerable to sea level rise (SLR) and the increased occurrence of intense, extreme weather conditions such as the cyclones of 2007–2009, as well as the melting of polar ice. To address SLR in Bangladesh, the Bangladesh Delta Plan 2100 launched in 2018.

Challenges in the Bangladesh Coastal Zone are likely to be exacerbated by the effects of climate change and associated sea-level rise, with 62 percent of coastal lands less than 3 m above sea level.

== Impact on people ==
Topographic map of Bangladesh

Bangladesh is one of the most populated countries in the world and the high population density of the country makes it vulnerable to any kind of natural disasters. In recent past, the country has reduced poverty yet 24% people live under poverty line. Moreover, the country is experiencing a rapid and unplanned urbanisation without ensuring the adequate infrastructure and basic social services. The unsustainable process of urbanisation makes the city dweller vulnerable to climate change as well.

Bangladesh has a critical environmental state by its nature. The fact that it has inland huge rivers makes it subject to constant floods especially due to severe climate change. Around 163 million living in Bangladesh have almost no escape from these natural phenomena due to their closeness to the rivers passing through and around the country.

=== Economic Impact ===
There are serious consequences from the impact of climate change on different sectors of the economy in the country, mainly but not exclusively concentrated in the agriculture sector, including fisheries (p. 27) and livestock (p. 30). A 2024 World Bank report notes even under lower carbon emissions scenarios, Bangladesh is vulnerable to extreme river flows that "without adaptation action are expected to increase the risk of extreme fluvial flood events and disproportionately impact informal urban developments" (p. 31). Rising sea levels threaten coastal zones; a "sea level rise of 0.5 meters would nearly double exposed assets in coastal areas and contribute to millions of internal migrants by midcentury". Historical data from the World Bank shows that a 500-year flood will lead to damage of 12% of exposed assets (p. 52). Additionally, the frequency of cyclones has led to average annual losses of US$1 billion that "disproportionately affect lower-income households in the southern divisions" (p. 25).

Areas and sectors vulnerable to climate change in Bangladesh
Climate & related elements	Critical vulnerable areas	Most impacted sectors
Temperature Rise and Drought	North West	Agriculture (crops, livestock, fisheries), water, electricity supply, health
Sea Level Rise and Salinity Intrusion	Coastal Areas, Islands	Agriculture (crop, fisheries, livestock), water (water logging, drinking water), human settlements, electricity supply, health
Floods	Central Region, North East Region, Char Land	Agriculture (crops, fisheries, livestock), water (urban, industry), infrastructure, human settlement, health, energy
Cyclone and Storm Surge	Coastal and Marine Zone	Marine fishing, infrastructure, human settlement, life and property
Drainage Congestion	Coastal Area, South West, Urban	Water (navigation), agriculture (crops)

=== Impact on migration ===
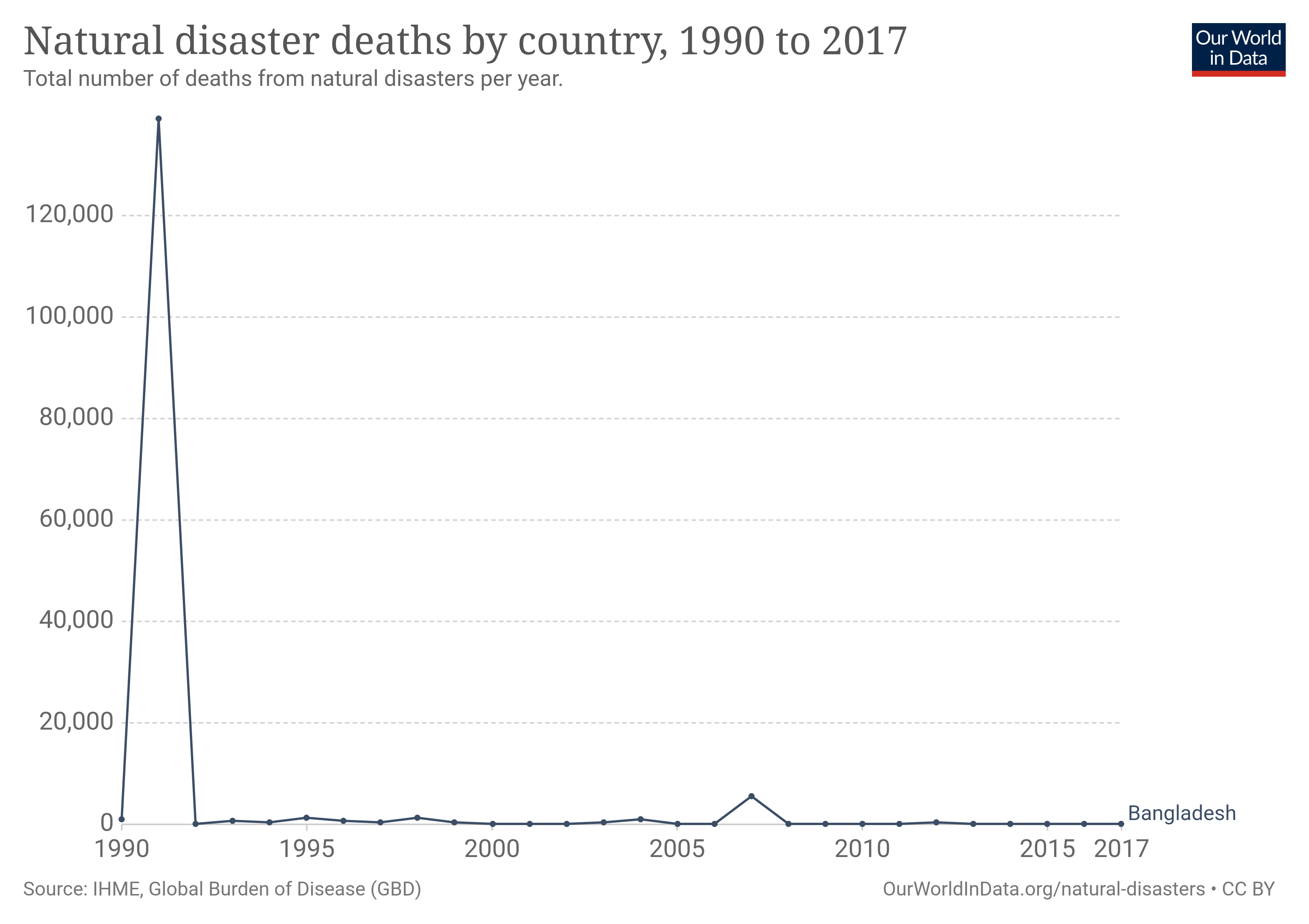
Deaths cause by Natural disaster in Bangladesh from 1990 to 2017

Climate change has caused many citizens of Bangladesh to migrate and by 2013 already 6.5 million people had been displaced. Poor and other vulnerable population groups have been affected disproportionately. Dhaka as well as local urban centers are mostly the destination of migration caused by climate change. This leads to an increased pressure on urban infrastructure and services, especially around health and education and creates a heightened risk of conflicts.

An increased number of floods, due to reduced river gradients, higher rainfall in the Ganges-Meghna-Brahmaputra river basins, and the melting of glaciers in the Himalayas, is considered the major reason for migration in the context of climate change in Bangladesh over all. These floods not only lead to the erosion of arable land, but also impact negatively the other income opportunities and often disrupt the livelihood patterns of whole families. In the northern regions of Bangladesh drought plays a major role in displacement of persons, in the South rising sea levels and cyclones are reasons for migration.

=== Agriculture ===
Bangladeshi farmers have been adapting to rising water levels by making creative floating gardens which mesh water hyacinth plants with bamboo and fertilizer to provide a sturdy floating platform for agriculture, according to climate researcher Alizé Carrère.

As an agrarian society, the people of Bangladesh are greatly dependent on various forms of agriculture. It is the main source of rural jobs in the country with over 87% of people related to the agri-based economy. In 2016, according to the World Bank, agriculture contributed to 14.77% of the country's GDP. Alongside a steady increase in agricultural production with the use of modern equipment and scientific methods, agriculture has been a key driver to eradicate rural poverty in Bangladesh. The risk of sea level rise and global warming is the biggest challenge not only to the country's agricultural improvement, but also to the success of poverty reduction efforts.

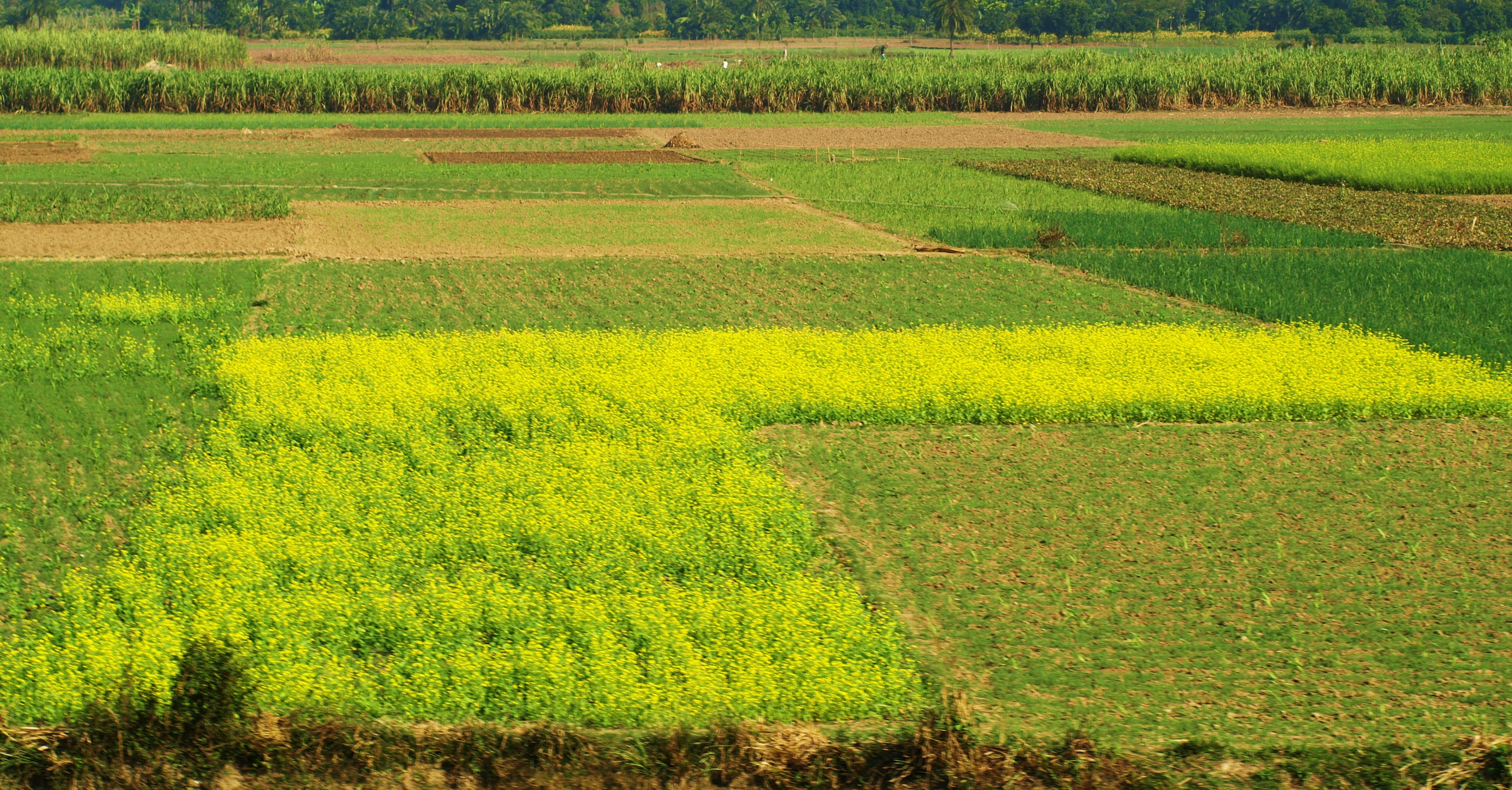
Agriculture in Bangladesh

As agricultural production is heavily related with temperature and rainfall, the current change in weather conditions is creating negative impact on crop yielding and the total area of arable land has been decreased. According to a report published by the Ministry of Environment and Forests - GoB, 1 degree Celsius increase in maximum temperature at vegetative, reproductive and ripening stages there was a decrease in Aman rice production by 2.94, 53.06 and 17.28 tons respectively. Another major threat deriving from this factor is water salinity which directly affects rice production especially in the coastal part of Bangladesh. The same report state that, the country will lose 12-16% of its land if the sea level rises by 1 meter. These challenges lead to food scarcity and insecurity for the huge populace of the country. There are several adaptation measures which are practised to help cope with abnormal climactic conditions, such as resilient varieties of crops, diversification, change in cropping pattern, mixed cropping, improved irrigation facilities, adopting soil conservation, agroforestry and so on.

A number of these measures have already been adapted by the government of Bangladesh and well practised throughout the country. The Bangladesh Rice Research Institute has introduced a varieties of saline tolerant rices like BR-11, BR-23, BRRI rice -28, BRRI rice -41, BRRI rice -47, BRRI rice -53 and BRRI rice -54. In the drought prone areas, BR-11, BR-23, BRRI rice -28, BRRI rice -41, BRRI rice -47, BRRI rice -53 and BRRI rice -54 are used which take short time to cultivate. To make the best and efficient utilization of water the Department of Agricultural Extension has introduced 'Alternate Wetting and Drying (AWD). The government also provide financial support to the affected farmers from different disasters and hazards

=== Food security ===
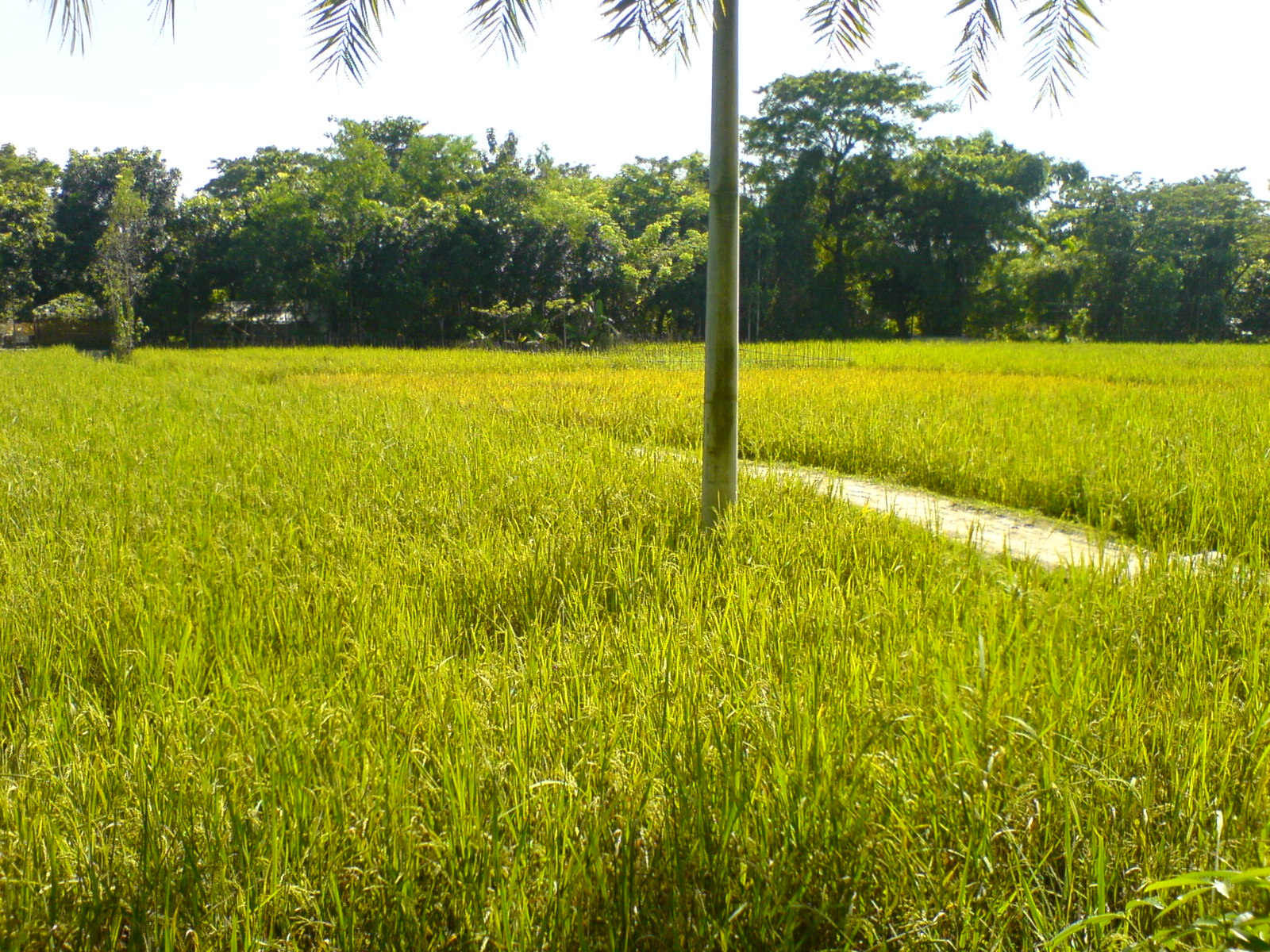
Rice growing at the village, Bangladesh.

With a larger population facing losses in arable lands, climate change poses an acute risk to the already malnourished population of Bangladesh. Although the country has managed to increase its production of rice since the nation's birth—from 10 million metric tons (MT) to over 30 MT—around 15.2 percent of the population is undernourished. In March and April 2017, pre-monsoon flash floods damaged 575,308 acres of Boro rice land across six districts in northeastern Bangladesh, representing about 32% of the total cultivated Boro rice area in those districts.Rice imports increased to three million tonnes from less than 100,000 tonnes the year before. A December 2018 study published by the American Meteorological Society found that climate change doubled the likelihood of the extreme pre-monsoon rainfall.

== Adaptation ==
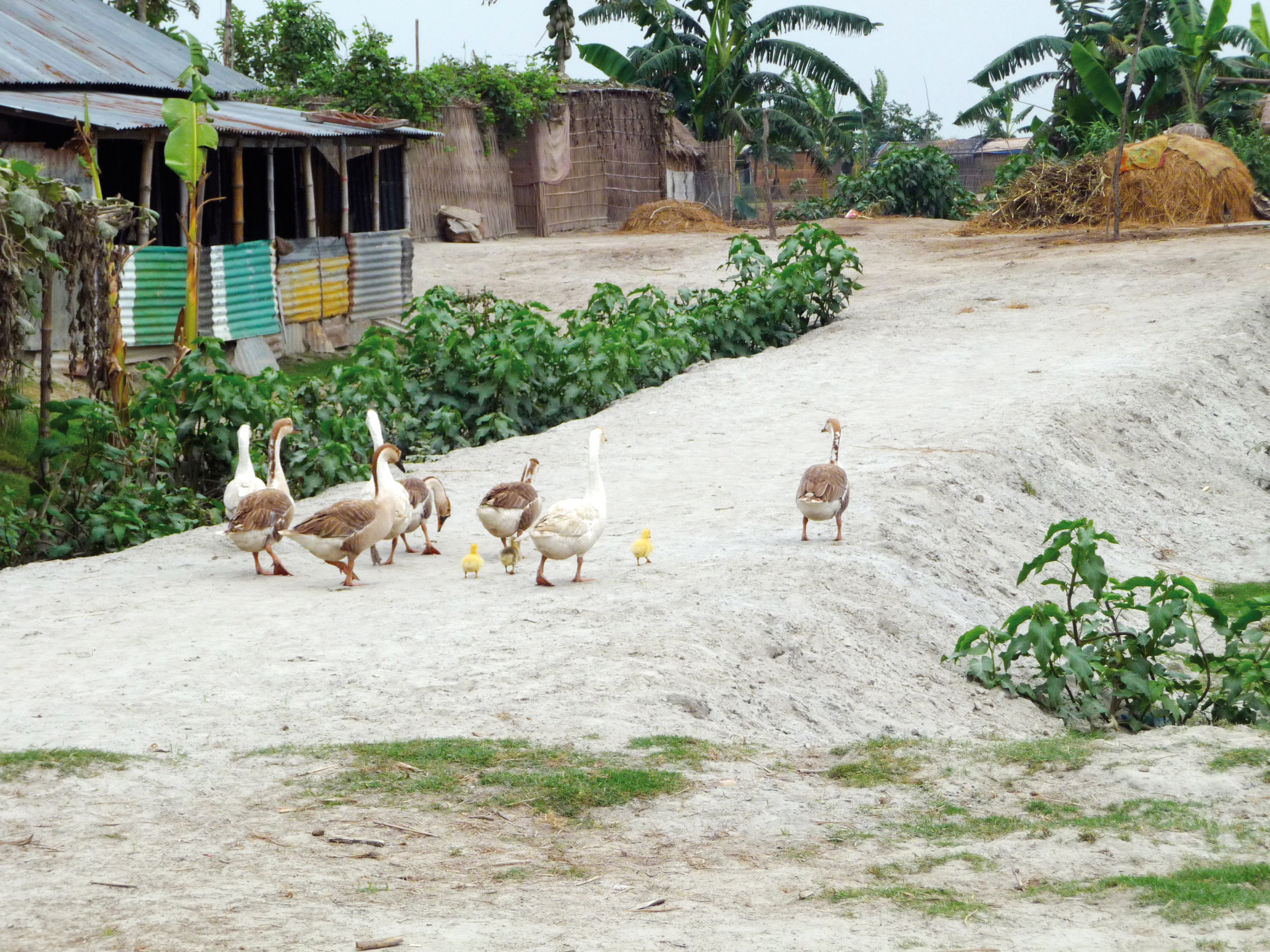
A disaster resilient village in Bangladesh

Climate change adaptation and disaster risk reduction may seem two different fields but both are similar in their objectives which is to build resilience in the face of hazards. The relation between the two field in one study is explained as 'Climate change adaptation requires the re-shaping and re-designing of development, social and economic practices to respond effectively to new or anticipated environmental changes. Likewise Disaster Risk Reduction seeks to influence development decision-making and protect development aspirations from environment related risks. The effectiveness of both adaptation and DRR are limited if they are not viewed within the broader context of sustainable development.

Bangladesh has shown important results on disaster risk mitigation and is in fact, one of the world leaders in disaster management. It has been made possible as the country changed its disaster programs from prevention to risk reduction. The deaths and damages by natural catastrophes has been drastically reduced in comparison to 1970. Once highly dependent on international aid for providing relief to the affected communities through ad-hoc relief supports, the country soon realized the importance of establishing a culture of resilience to mitigate the risk occurred from the catastrophes.

With a mission 'to achieve a paradigm shift in disaster management from conventional response and relief to a more comprehensive risk reduction culture, and to promote food security as an important factor in ensuring the resilience of communities to hazards' the government of Bangladesh in collaboration with multilateral partners and civil society organizations working on a direction to achieve 3 goals which are i. Saving lives, ii. Protecting investments iii. Effective recovery and building.

Bangladesh allocates about $3 billion annually for adaptation and disaster management, with 75 percent of this funding sourced domestically.

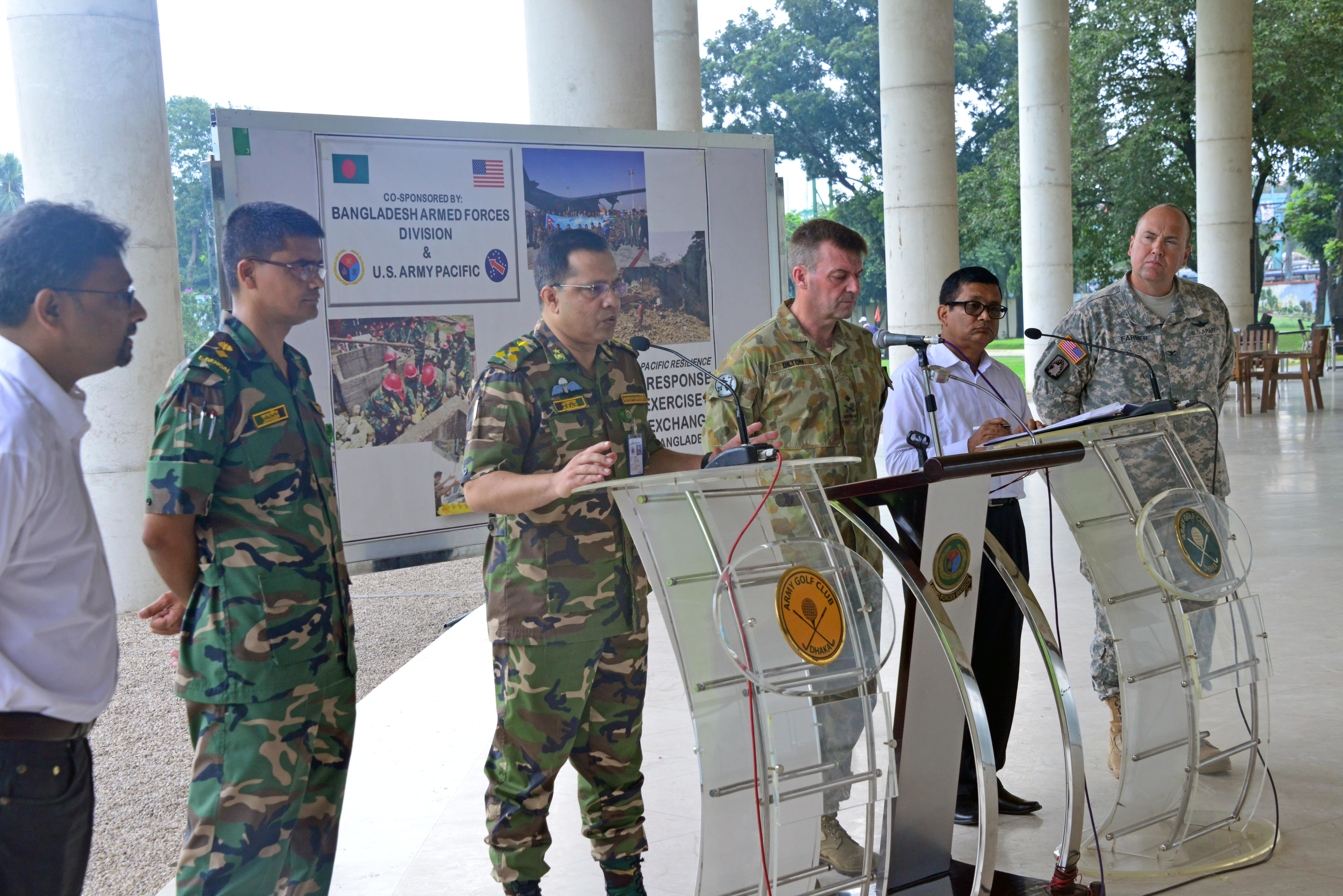
Bangladesh kick off the 2015 Pacific Resilience exercise

One of the major successes of Bangladesh on adaptation of climate change is a strong institutional setup. The Ministry of Disaster Management and Relief (MoDMR) has a wide range of programs on DRR. It has recently drafted a 'National Plan for Disaster Management (2016–2020)' with a detail institutional framework on disaster management. According to the NPDM, disaster management policy and activities is guided by several drivers including, a) Disaster Management Act 2012; b) Standing Orders on Disasters (SOD) first introduced in 1997 and then revised in 2010; (SOD) first introduced in 1997 and then revised in 2010; c) National Plan for Disaster Management 2010–2015; d) Disaster Policy Act 2015; e) SAARC Framework for Action (SFA) 2006–2015; f) Sendai Framework for Disaster Risk Reduction (SFDRR) 2016–2030; g) Asian Regional Plan for Disaster Risk Reduction (ARPDRR); and the Sustainable Development Goals (SDGs).

A better baseline understanding of where populations live exactly in the coastal zones, and their poverty incidence or socioeconomic vulnerability, could help inform decision-making concerning large-scale adaptation options. Possible options include embankments and cyclone shelters, or softer adaptation solutions like cash transfers and social safety nets. Research work on high-resolution synthetic population mapping can help target such interventions more accurately for the benefit of poorer population segments.

=== Action plans ===
The Bangladesh National Adaptation Programme Action - NAPA in its action plan have collected, structured and ranked a series of climate adaptation needs and vulnerabilities, as well as sector-specific costs and benefits. These proposed actions have considered poverty reduction and security of livelihoods with a gender perspective as the most important set of criteria for prioritization of adaptation needs and activities.

Bangladesh is also supported by different international organizations such as United Nations, World Bank, and so on. With help from the United Nations Development Program (UNDP), Bangladesh developed a flood action plan initiating a culture of disaster management and risk reduction. UNDP also supported Bangladesh to establish the Disaster Management Bureau.

Bangladesh has ratified the Paris Agreement and set climate mitigation targets to reduce greenhouse gas emissions by 6.73% by 2030 (p. 9). The country is working to reduce road traffic congestion and shift to a rail transport system, to reduce agricultural emissions, and increase forest cover by 150,000 hectares (p. 9).

== Society and culture ==
=== Women ===
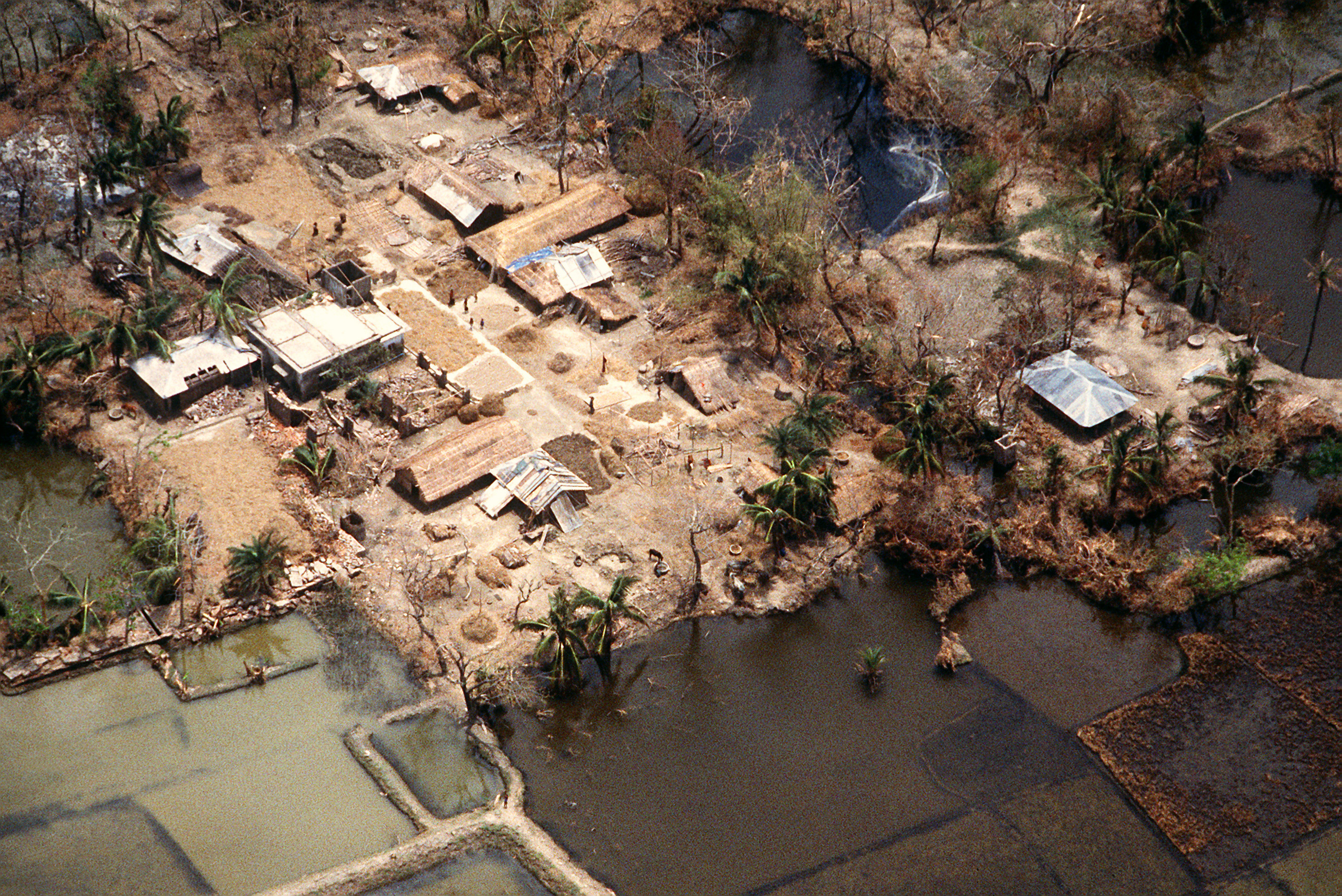
Flooded village after 1991 cyclone

In 2012, it was labeled a Least Developed Country by the United Nations, with high rates of poverty and weak government, meaning it is especially vulnerable to natural disasters. It is densely populated and about 63 percent of its population was working in the agriculture, forestry, or fishing sectors in 2010. Slightly less than half of Bangladesh's population is women and, in 2001, 80 percent of women lived in rural areas. Bangladeshi women are particularly vulnerable to climate change because they have limited mobility and power in society. Research shows that, after the cyclone and flooding of 1991, Bangladeshi women aged 20–44 had a much higher death rate than men of the same age: 71 per 1000, compared to 15 per 1000 for men. Even if a cyclone warning is issued, many women die because they must wait at home for their relatives to return before they can seek shelter.

As climate change progresses, access to and salinization of water sources are becoming problems in Bangladesh. When there is a lack of drinking water, women are responsible for procuring it regardless of the distance they must travel or the terrain they must cover. During natural disasters, male unemployment rises. When men become unemployed, women's responsibilities increase because they must secure and manage income and resources on top of feeding the family and caring for children and the elderly. As the number of men at home without income or occupation rises, more women report mental and physical abuse by their male relatives. To cope with climatic change, women store matches, food for the family, fodder for the livestock, medicine, and fuel sources in safe places in case of disaster. They also teach their children skills such as swimming to prepare them for crisis. The global relief agency CARE believes that climate-resilient jobs such as duck rearing can help increase Bangladeshi women's resilience to climate change.

Since the disasters of 1991, Bangladeshi women are more involved in disaster response decision-making, through local committees and community organizations established by the government and NGOs. As part of the United Nations Framework Convention on Climate Change's National Adaptation Programme of Action (NAPA), Bangladesh published a Poverty Reduction Strategy paper in 2005 that incorporated gender mainstreaming into its climate change adaptation plan, but as of 2008 those goals and policies were not fully implemented.

=== Media ===
In 2018, the New York WILD film festival gave the "Best Short Film" award to a 12-minute documentary, titled Adaptation Bangladesh: Sea Level Rise. The film explores the way in which Bangladeshi farmers are preventing their farms from flooding by building floating gardens made of water hyacinth and bamboo.

=== Civil society ===
Bangladesh also has a large network of NGOs all through the country who are highly active in supporting the people vulnerable from climate change.

Various CSOs and NGOs have been helping the Bangladeshi government in policy formulations. Bangladesh Centre for Advanced Studies (BCAS), SUSHILON, Forum of Environmental Journalists of Bangladesh (FEJB) are some of the CSOs and NGOs that have been actively coordinating the government of Bangladesh in recent years in formulating climate change policies.

== See also ==
- Environment of Bangladesh
- Energy policy of Bangladesh
- Renewable energy in Bangladesh
