= 2024 Bangladesh heatwave =

Natural disaster

Meteorological history
- Date: April 1, 2024
- Heat event
- Max temp: 43.8 °C (110.8 °F)

Overall effects
- Fatalities: 15+
- Areas affected: Bangladesh

The 2024 Bangladesh heatwave was a significant weather event affecting the South Asian nation of Bangladesh. The heatwave was characterized by extremely high temperatures that reached up to 43.8 °C (110.8 °F), 16 degrees more than the annual average. It led to nationwide school closures, impacting an estimated 33 million children's education. The heatwave, which swept over several northern and southern districts of Bangladesh, is considered one of the most intense since records began in 1948. The event has been attributed by World Weather Attribution to climate change. It has also been linked to other man-made causes, including rapid urbanisation, forest clearance, shrinking water bodies, and increased usage of air conditioning. This heatwave marks the second consecutive year that Bangladesh has been forced to close schools due to extreme heat.

== History ==
The 2024 Bangladesh heatwave represents a continuation of a disturbing climatic trend in the region. Historical data indicates an increasing frequency and intensity of heatwaves in Bangladesh over the past few decades. The 2023 Asia heat wave, which led to nationwide school closures, was the first of such severity in the country's recorded history. The 2024 heatwave surpassed its predecessor in intensity, underscoring the escalating climate crisis in the region. The repeated occurrence of such extreme weather events has prompted scientists to investigate their correlation with global warming and local environmental changes. The 2024 heatwave was not an isolated incident but part of a broader pattern of increasing temperatures and extreme weather events that have been affecting Bangladesh and the larger South Asian region.

=== School closure ===
The government extended the Eid holiday break to April 27 because of the heatwave. The Supreme Court of Bangladesh ordered schools to shut down on Thursday, May 2. Education Minister Mohibul Hasan Chowdhury instructed secondary schools to re-open on Saturday, May 4. The decision to hold classes on the weekend was criticized by teachers.

=== Ending ===
During the last weeks of the heatwave, it rained a couple of times, and the temperature started to return to normal.
