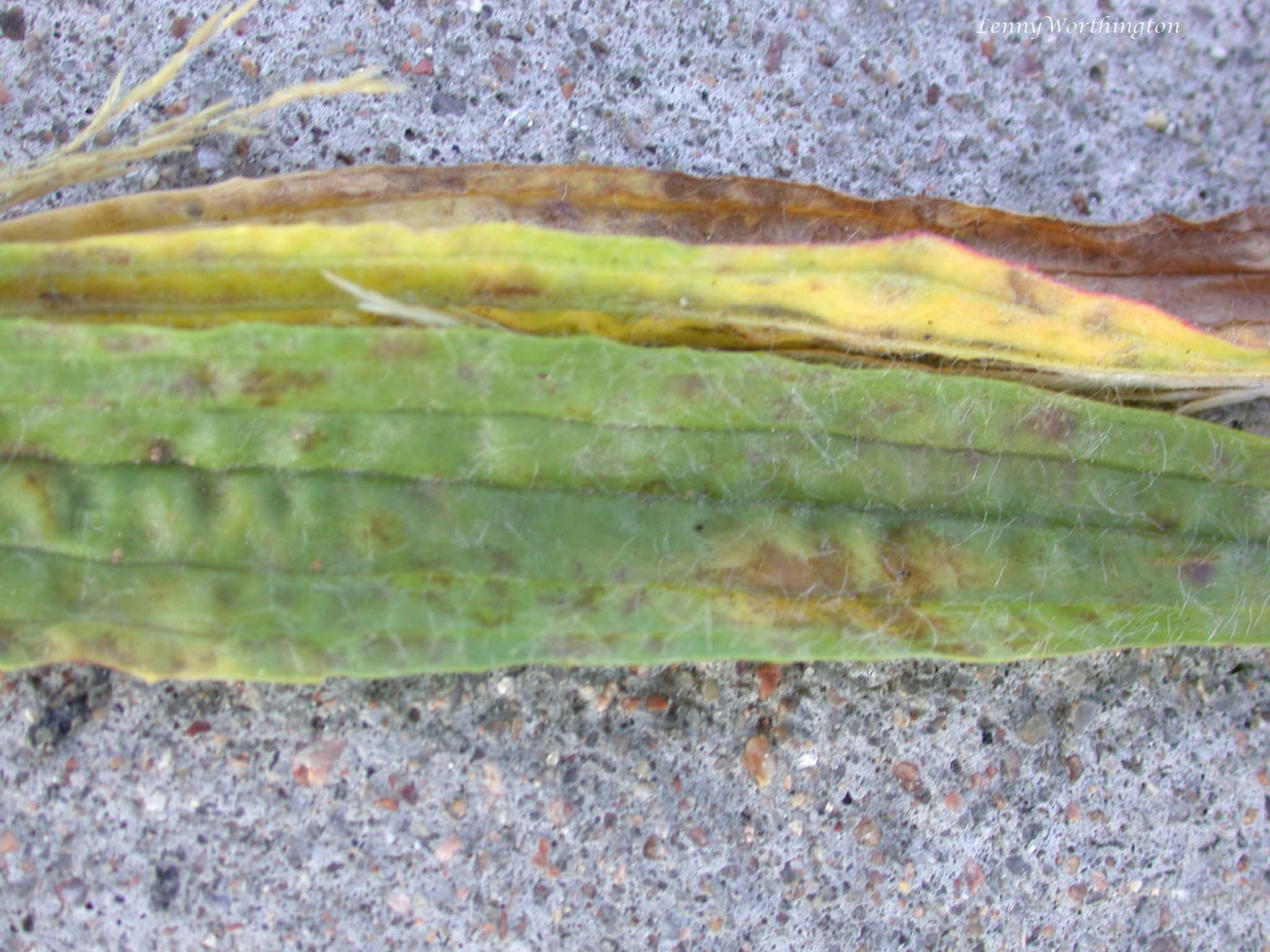
- Ditylenchus dipsaci on ribwort plantain (Plantago lanceolata)

Scientific classification
- Kingdom: Animalia
- Phylum: Nematoda
- Class: Secernentea
- Order: Tylenchida
- Family: Anguinidae
- Genus: Ditylenchus
- Species: D. dipsaci

Binomial name
- Ditylenchus dipsaci (Kuhn, 1857)

Synonyms
- Anguillula dipsaci Kuhn, 1857

= Ditylenchus dipsaci =

Stem and bulb nematode

Species of nematode known to infect plants of the onion family

Ditylenchus dipsaci is a plant pathogenic nematode that primarily infects onion and garlic. It is commonly known as the stem nematode, the stem and bulb eelworm, or onion bloat (in the United Kingdom). Symptoms of infection include stunted growth, discoloration of bulbs, and swollen stems. D. dipsaci is a migratory endoparasite that has a five-stage lifecycle and the ability to enter into a dormancy stage. D. dipsaci enters through stomata or plant wounds and creates galls or malformations in plant growth. This allows for the entrance of secondary pathogens such as fungi and bacteria. Management of disease is maintained through seed sanitation, heat treatment, crop rotation, and fumigation of fields. D. dipsaci is economically detrimental because infected crops are unmarketable.

== Morphology and biology ==
D. dipsaci is a microscopic worm about 1.5 mm long. It penetrates plants from either the soil or infested planting material and occasionally from seeds. They live between the cells of onion or garlic leaves and between the scales of the bulbs where they feed on cell sap and multiply. The female lays 250 eggs during a season and six generations may develop under optimum conditions when the temperature is in the range 15–20 °C. As the number of nematodes increases, symptoms become visible. Onion leaves start to curl, garlic leaves become yellow and die, bulb scales are loosened, and bulb necks become cracked. Development continues in infested bulbs during storage. D. dipsaci is not restricted to onions and garlic. Its other plant hosts include peas, beetroot, vegetable marrow, pumpkin, rhubarb, and ornamental bulbs. Some weeds also act as hosts, including Stellaria media, Linaria vulgaris, Polygonum aviculare, Fallopia convolvulus, and Galium aparine.

== Lifecycle ==
Stem and bulb nematodes are migratory endoparasites. Their lifecycle occurs in five stages with the first molt occurring in the egg and the second and third molt occurring in the soil. By the fourth stage, juveniles have entered the plant through young tissue and/or seedlings. The fourth molt then occurs inside the plant. The adult female must mate with a male to reproduce and lay eggs. A complete reproductive lifecycle of the stem and bulb nematode is 19–25 days (egg to egg). Reproduction takes place in succulent, rapidly growing tissues or in storage organs and continues throughout. A female can lay 200–500 eggs in her lifespan. However, if conditions are unfavorable, the nematodes can halt their lifecycle. The lifespan of stem and bulb nematodes is about 70 days. Most generations are passed inside bulbs, stems, and leaves. Eggs and larvae overwinter in dried infected host material. They are also found in weed hosts and seeds of composite. Stem and bulb nematodes can survive up to two years in freezing or extremely dry environments in the soil. D. dipsaci can survive on or in plant tissue by entering cryptobiosis and survive for 3–5 years in this stage. During dormancy, D. dipsaci shows no sign of life and the metabolic activity is almost at a standstill.

== Distribution and environment ==
D. dipsaci is one of the most devastating plant parasitic nematodes in the world. Its races are very diverse and found in most temperate areas of the world, including Europe and the Mediterranean region, North and South America, northern and southern Africa, Asia, and Oceania, but are not usually found in tropical regions. If an infestation occurs, it can commonly kill 60–80% of the crop. The suitable environment is between 15 and 20 °C and moisture is required for movement.

== Disease cycle ==
Stem and bulb nematodes are migratory endoparasites and can be spread through irrigation water, tools, and animals. When the plants are covered in a film of moisture, D. dipsaci can move upwards to new leaves and stems. They enter through stomata or wounds. D. dipsaci feeds on the parenchymatous cells of the cortex once inside the plant. They release an enzyme, pectinase, that dissolves the cell walls. Once D. dipsaci begins to feed on the plant, cells near the head of the nematode lose all or a portion of their contents. The cells surrounding these begin to divide and enlarge. This develops into a gall or malformation of the seedling. This opening allows secondary pathogens to enter such as bacteria and fungi. Favorable entry of young seedlings into the soil occurs through the root cap or from inside the seed. The plant cells become enlarged due to the disappearance of chloroplasts and an increase of intracellular spaces in parenchyma tissue. Once the bulbs enlarge, D. dipsaci migrates down the stem. This causes the stem to become puffy and soft due to cavities, which can lead to collapse. D. dipsaci only enters the soil again if conditions become unfavorable.

== Hosts and symptoms ==
D. dipsaci has an extensive host range. Major damage occurs in garlic, onion, carrot, fava bean, alfalfa, oats, and strawberry. Ornamental plants can also be infected including hyacinth and tulip. It is estimated that this pathogen infects 400–500 plant species worldwide.

In Allium species (onions, garlic, and leeks), infected plants show characteristic symptoms including stunted growth, yellow spots, leaf curl, and foliage lesions. Stems often have swollen regions called "pickles". As adult nematodes migrate into the scales of the bulb, the scales become soft, grey, and loosely packed. Highly infected bulbs can also split apart or show malformed bloating. The leaves of the plant become flaccid and may collapse. This can lead to defoliated plants. Garlic shows similar symptoms of leaf yellowing and stunted bulbs. When harvested, the infected garlic may be missing portions of the root system.

In fava beans (Vicia faba), symptoms of infection include reddish-brown stem lesions that can turn black. Young bean pods are dark-brown. Infected seeds are smaller and distorted compared to healthy beans. Speckles and spots are also commonly seen on infected fava beans.

Up to 30 biological races occur within D. dipsaci that are mostly distinguished by their host preferences. Very few morphological differences are seen between the races which makes diagnosis difficult. Seed material samples from infected plants can be dissected and viewed under a microscope to confirm the correct race.

== Management ==
Several different methods are currently used to reduce the presence and destruction of D. dipsaci. Infection can be prevented by ensuring that only clean seeds and bulbs are planted. Bulbs and seeds can be disinfected by hot-water treatments. Soaking them in 110 to 115 °F water with formalin, a formaldehyde solution, for two to three hours can successfully kill nematodes.

Proper sanitation in fields and of tools is essential in preventing and controlling the spread of D. dipsaci because they can survive and reproduce in infected plants and residues. The fourth-stage juvenile is the most resilient and can survive repeated desiccation or drying and recover upon rehydration. All infected tissues should be removed from growing sites and destroyed to control populations, and all farm tools and equipment should be cleaned of potentially contaminated soil before moving them to a new location.

Races of D. dipsaci are highly host-specific, so employing a three-year crop rotation can deprive the nematodes of a suitable host and starve the population. Because some weeds serve as hosts for nematodes, controlling weeds in fields decreases the number of susceptible hosts and the ability of the nematodes to survive and spread.

The time a susceptible host crop is planted also increases the severity of nematode damage. Cooler temperatures and lower humidity can suppress the reproduction and infestation rates of D. dipsaci. Growers should avoid planting susceptible bulbs, seeds, or seedlings during seasons of peak nematode infection. Soil fumigation in fields during fall can control nematodes on a susceptible crop in the spring. A nematicide fumigant that is specific to the genus Ditylenchus should be used. Selectively fumigate only the regions of the fields that are infected to ensure that the high cost of fumigating does not mitigate the economic gain from saving crops from nematode damage. Fumigants are usually applied before planting and subsequently after emergence.

== Importance ==
Nearly 450 different plant species are susceptible to D. dipsaci due to the vast number of races. Many of these plants are economically valuable food crops and ornamentals and cannot be sold if they are infected or damaged by stem and bulb nematodes. D. dipsaci is especially important economically because the damage it can cause renders the plants unmarketable. Crops such as onions and carrots cannot be sold because the products are infected and damaged. Other crops such as alfalfa, oats, and tulips that are not used primarily for their roots still suffer necrosis and stunting that slowly destroys the plant. Seeds, bulbs, or saplings infected with nematodes often do not survive to maturity and are worthless.
