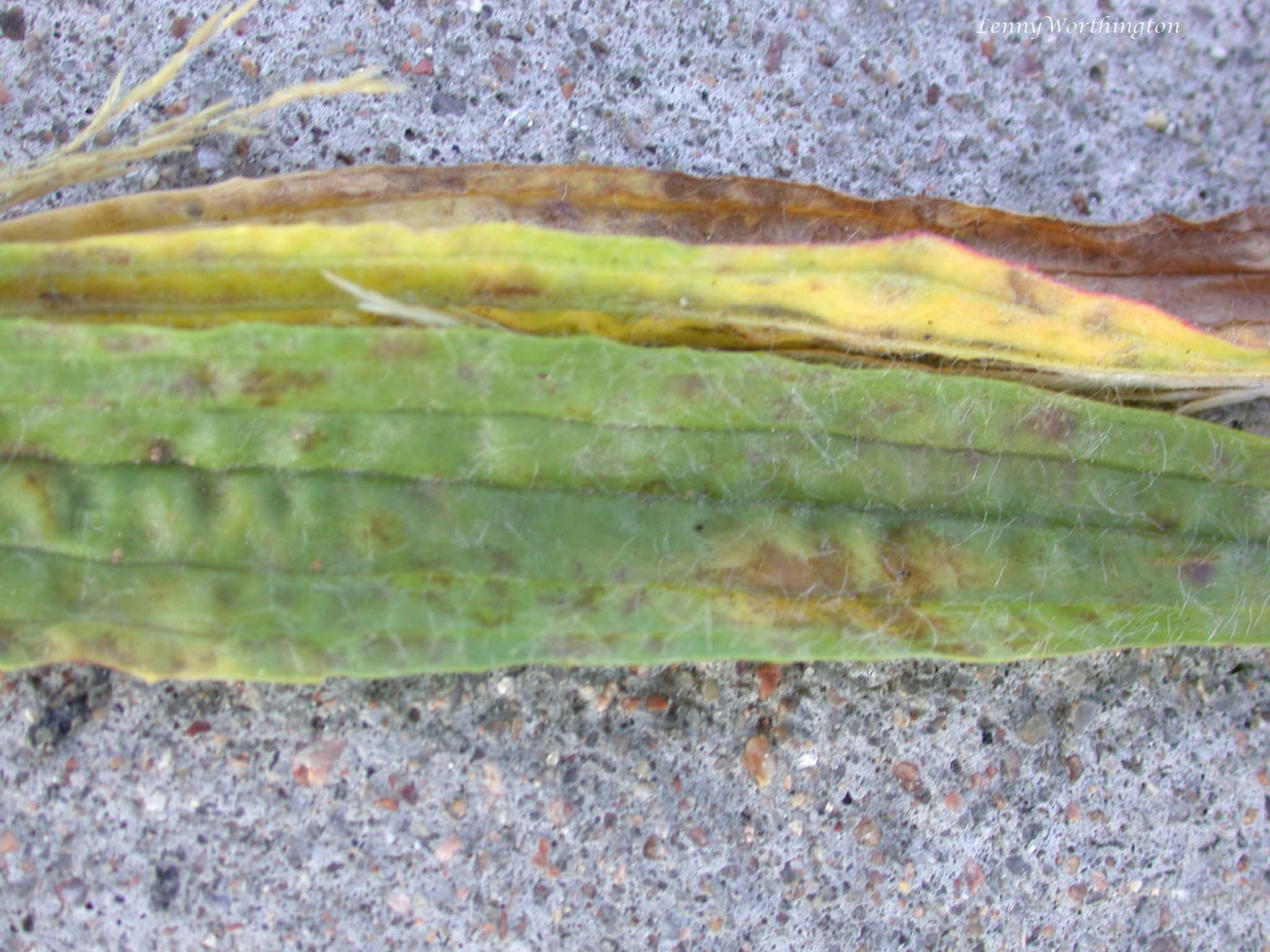
- Ditylenchus dipsaci on ribwort plantain (Plantago lanceolata)

Scientific classification
- Kingdom: Animalia
- Phylum: Nematoda
- Class: Secernentea
- Order: Tylenchida
- Family: Anguinidae
- Genus: Ditylenchus; Filipjev, 1936

Species
- Ditylenchus africanus; Ditylenchus angustus; Ditylenchus destructor; Ditylenchus dipsaci; Ditylenchus myceliophagous; Ditylenchus phyllobia

Synonyms
- Anguillulina (Filip'ev, 1936); Nothotylenchus (Thorne, 1941); Boleodoroides (Mathur, Khan and Prasad, 1966); Diptenchus (Khan, Chawla and Seshadri, 1969); Safianema (Siddiqi, 1980); Orrina (Brzeski, 1981)

= Ditylenchus =

Peanut pod nematode

Genus of roundworms

Ditylenchus is a genus of plant pathogenic nematodes.
