= Agriculture in Bangladesh =

Development of agricultural output of Bangladesh in 2019 US$ since 1961

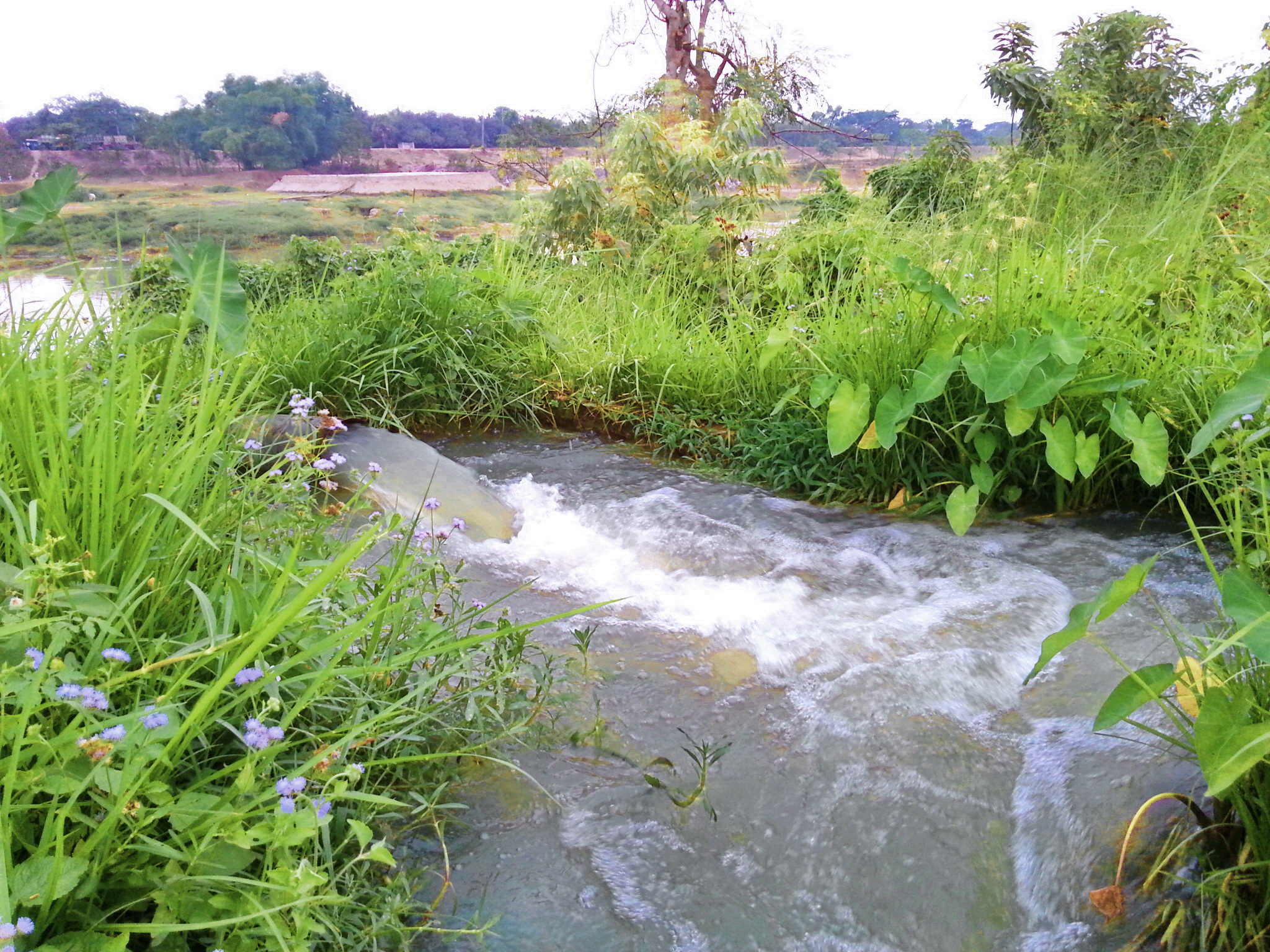
As watercourses such as canals, both natural and manmade, and rivers contribute as the vital source of irrigation, their spread across the country is attributed as a key factor for the economic and geographic extent of agriculture in Bangladesh. Photographed is a process of irrigation underway in Comilla, enabled by a pump that is extracting water from the Gumti seen in the background.

Agriculture is the largest employment sector in Bangladesh, making up 14.2 percent of Bangladesh's GDP in 2017 and employing about 42.7 percent of the workforce. As of the financial year 2022 to 2023, the agricultural sector contributed to more than 12% of GDP. The performance of this sector has an overwhelming impact on major macroeconomic objectives like employment generation, poverty alleviation, human resources development, food security, and other economic and social forces. A plurality of Bangladeshis earn their living from agriculture. Due to a number of factors, Bangladesh's labour-intensive agriculture has achieved steady increases in food grain production despite the often unfavorable weather conditions. These include better flood control and irrigation, a generally more efficient use of fertilisers, as well as the establishment of better distribution and rural credit networks.

Although rice and jute are the primary crops, maize and vegetables are assuming greater importance. Due to the expansion of irrigation networks, some wheat producers have switched to cultivation of maize which is used mostly as poultry feed. Tea is grown in the northeast. There are 166 tea estates in Bangladesh, covering almost 280,000 acres of land. Bangladesh is the 9th largest Tea producer, producing around 2% of the world’s Tea production. Because of Bangladesh's fertile soil and normally ample water supply, rice can be grown and harvested three times a year in many areas. The country is among the top producers of rice (third), potatoes (seventh), tropical fruits (sixth), jute (second), and farmed fish (fifth). With 35.8 million metric tons produced in 2000, rice is Bangladesh's principal crop. As of 2024, it is expected that rice production in Bangladesh will exceed 37.7 million metric tons, an increase of nearly 700000 tons from last year. Bangladesh produces almost 5 metric tons of rice per hectare, making the country self sufficient in rice production. In comparison to rice, wheat output in 1999 was 1.9 million tonnes (1,900,000 long tons; 2,100,000 short tons).

Population pressure continues to place a severe burden on productive capacity, sometimes creating a food deficit, especially of wheat. Foreign assistance and commercial imports fill the gap. Underemployment remains a serious problem, and a growing concern for Bangladesh's agricultural sector will be its ability to absorb additional manpower. Finding alternative sources of employment will continue to be a daunting problem for future governments, particularly with the increasing numbers of landless peasants who already account for about half the rural labour force. Other challenges facing the sector include environmental issues: insecticides, water management challenges, pollution, and land degradation all effect the agricultural system in Bangladesh. Bangladesh is particularly vulnerable to climate change, with extreme weather and temperature changes significantly changing the conditions for growing food. Adaptation of the agricultural sector is a major concern for policy addressing climate change in Bangladesh.

== Food crops ==
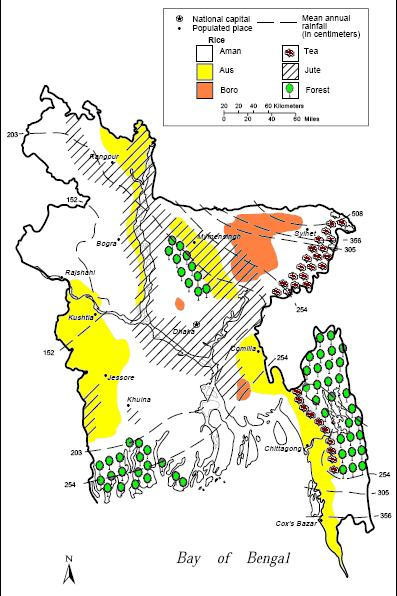
Map showing the growing areas of major agricultural products.

Although rice, wheat, mango and jute are the primary crops, rice and wheat are mostly the main crops or food crops in the country. Due to the expansion of irrigation networks, some wheat producers have switched to cultivation of maize which is used mostly as poultry feed. Tea is grown in the northeast. Because of Bangladesh's fertile soil and normally ample water supply, rice can be grown and harvested three times a year in many areas. Due to a number of factors, Bangladesh's labour-intensive agriculture has achieved steady increases in food grain production despite the often unfavorable weather conditions. These include better flood control and irrigation, a generally more efficient use of fertilizers, and the establishment of better distribution and rural credit networks. With 28.8 million metric tons produced in 2005–2006 (July–June), rice is Bangladesh's principal crop. By comparison, wheat output in 2005–2006 was 9 million metric tons. Population pressure continues to place a severe burden on productive capacity, creating a food deficit, especially of wheat. Foreign assistance and commercial imports fill the gap. Underemployment remains a serious problem, and a growing concern for Bangladesh's agricultural sector will be its ability to absorb additional manpower.

Food grains are cultivated primarily for subsistence. Only a small percentage of total production makes its way into commercial channels. Other Bangladeshi food crops, however, are grown chiefly for the domestic market. They include potatoes and sweet potatoes, with a combined record production of 1.9 million tons in FY 1984. In 2023, Bangladesh produced more than 10 million tons of potatoes with an estimated yield of nearly 9 tons per acre. oilseeds, with an annual average production of 250,000 tons; and fruits such as bananas, jackfruit, mangoes, and pineapples. Estimates of sugarcane production put annual production at more than 7 million tons per year, most of it processed into a coarse, unrefined sugar known as gur, and sold domestically.

=== Rice ===
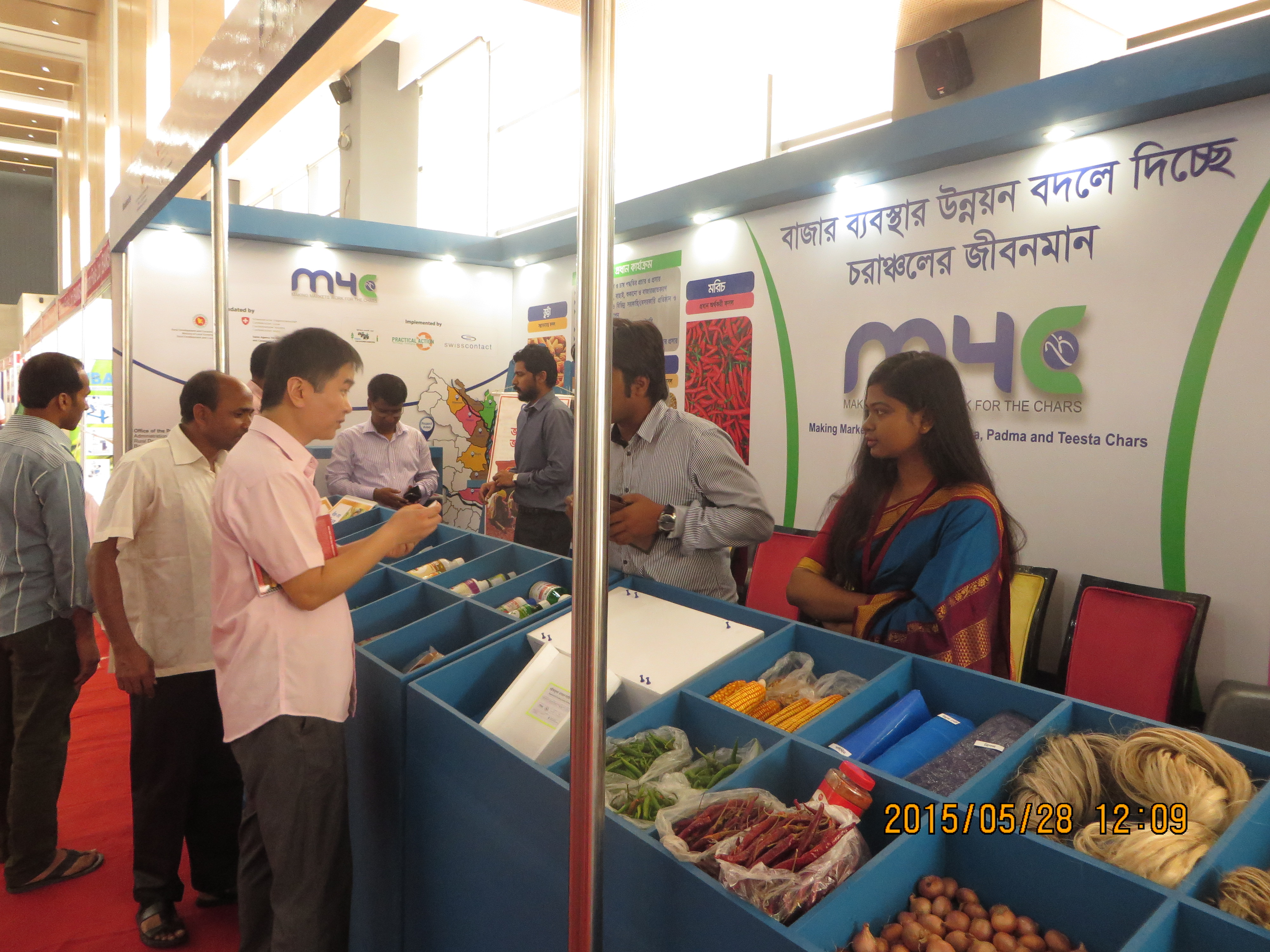
Visitor in Agro Tech fair in Dhaka

Rice is Bangladesh's primary crop and staple food, dominating agricultural production, employment, nutritional intake, and contributing substantially to national income. Since 2019, Bangladesh ranked as the third-largest producer of rice globally, reaching about 39.1 million tonnes in 2023. Rice is cultivated in three distinct seasons, with the Bangladesh Rice Research Institute playing a significant role in researching and developing methods to improve its production.

=== Wheat ===
Wheat is the second major food grain of Bangladesh. While historically not a major crop in Bangladesh, domestic wheat production hit a record high of 1.5 million tonnes in 1985, although still accounting for only 7 to 9 percent of total food grain production. Since then, wheat production in Bangladesh has remained stagnant, with annual production of about 1 million tonnes, falling significantly short of the demand of 7 million tonnes. The shortfall is met through imports, which have exceeded 6 million tonnes, amounting to $1.4–$2 billion in imports annually. Wheat imports constitute the majority of imported food grains in the country. About half of Bangladesh's wheat is grown on irrigated land.

=== Potato ===
Potato is overproduced in the country compared to the demand. As a result, potatoes are frequently sold at below production cost or dumped.

== Animal husbandry ==
Animal husbandry contributes about 2.9% of the national GDP, with an annual growth rate of 5.5%.

=== Bovine ===
Bovines are raised for dairy, leather, meat and in previous years to cultivate land, fuel from manure and transportation.

==== Dairy ====
Dairy industry is an important industry for the rural community in Bangladesh. Production of local cheese is increasing to supplant importation. Other products include ghee (a local type of high fat butter), labang (a fermented dairy milk) and mattha (special type of buttermilk) is also increasing. Bangladesh imported $150 million of cheese vs. $17k export of cheese in 2023, which it is eager to close. The pandemic caused major loss and disruption to the industry.

=== Poultry ===
Poultry farming in Bangladesh is the process of keeping various types of birds for meat, egg, feather, or sale. In Bangladesh, poultry birds are primarily used for meat and egg consumption.

The weather in Bangladesh is perfect for raising poultry, with several types of poultry birds having been domesticated for many years. As of 2017, about 300 billion taka was invested in the poultry industry, with an estimated 150,000 poultry farms in Bangladesh. From 2 to 4 March 2017, Poultry Science Association Bangladeshi branch held the tenth International Poultry Show and Seminar in Bashundhara Convention centre, Dhaka, Bangladesh. By 2019, significant further investments were noted in the sector. The farms produce 570 million tonnes of meat and 7.34 billion eggs annually. Poultry feed is primarily made from imported soybean and soy meal. The per capita consumption of meat and egg in Bangladesh remains below the level recommended by the Food and Agriculture Organization. The impact of Avian Influenza in 2007 and the COVID-19 pandemic has been detrimental to the poultry and associated feed industry in Bangladesh. The outbreak in 2007 resulted in the closure of two-thirds of all farms in Bangladesh. In March 2023, poultry farmers urged the government to set chicken and egg prices for the local market, highlighting the industry's significance in the country's economy Notable figures in the poultry sector include Late Syed Hedayetullah and Phanindra Nath Saha, who developed the poultry sector with Aftab Bahumukhi Farms.

=== Shrimp ===
As of the end of 1987, prevailing methods for culturing shrimp in Bangladesh were still relatively unsophisticated, and average yields per hectare were low. In the late 1980s, almost all inland shrimping was done by capture rather than by intensive aquaculture. Farmers relied primarily on wild postlarval and juvenile shrimp as their sources of stock, acquired either by trapping in ponds during tidal water exchange or by gathering from local estuaries and stocking directly in the ponds. Despite the seemingly low level of technology applied to shrimp aquaculture, it became an increasingly important part of the frozen seafood industry in the mid-1980s. The shrimp farming industry in Bangladesh has been handicapped by low-quality and low prices.

The World Bank and the Asian Development Bank financed projects to develop shrimp aquaculture in the 1980s. Much of the emphasis was on construction of modern hatcheries. Private investors were also initiating similar projects to increase capacity and to introduce modern technology that would increase average yields. The Food and Agriculture Organization of the United Nations (FAO) has provided assistance to the shrimp and fishing industry in meeting fish safety and quality control standards based on the Hazard Analysis Critical Control Point (HACCP) approach.

Shrimp in the wild are associated with mangroves. Mangrove estuaries such as those found in the Sundarbans of southwestern Bangladesh are especially rich productive ecosystems and provide the spawning grounds for shrimp and fish. Intensive shrimp farming often involves conversion of mangrove stands to brine ponds where shrimp are grown.

=== Other ===
Other animals raised for various purposes include: goat, cattle, sheep, duck, horses, silkworm, various birds and fishes. Beekeeping in floriculture region is becoming popular too.

Livestock population estimation (2021):
| Species | Count (in millions) |
|---|---|
| Cattle | 25.7 |
| Buffalo | 0.83 |
| Goat | 14.8 |
| Ship | 1.9 |
| Chicken | 118.7 |
| Duck | 34.1 |

== Commodity crops ==
=== Tea ===
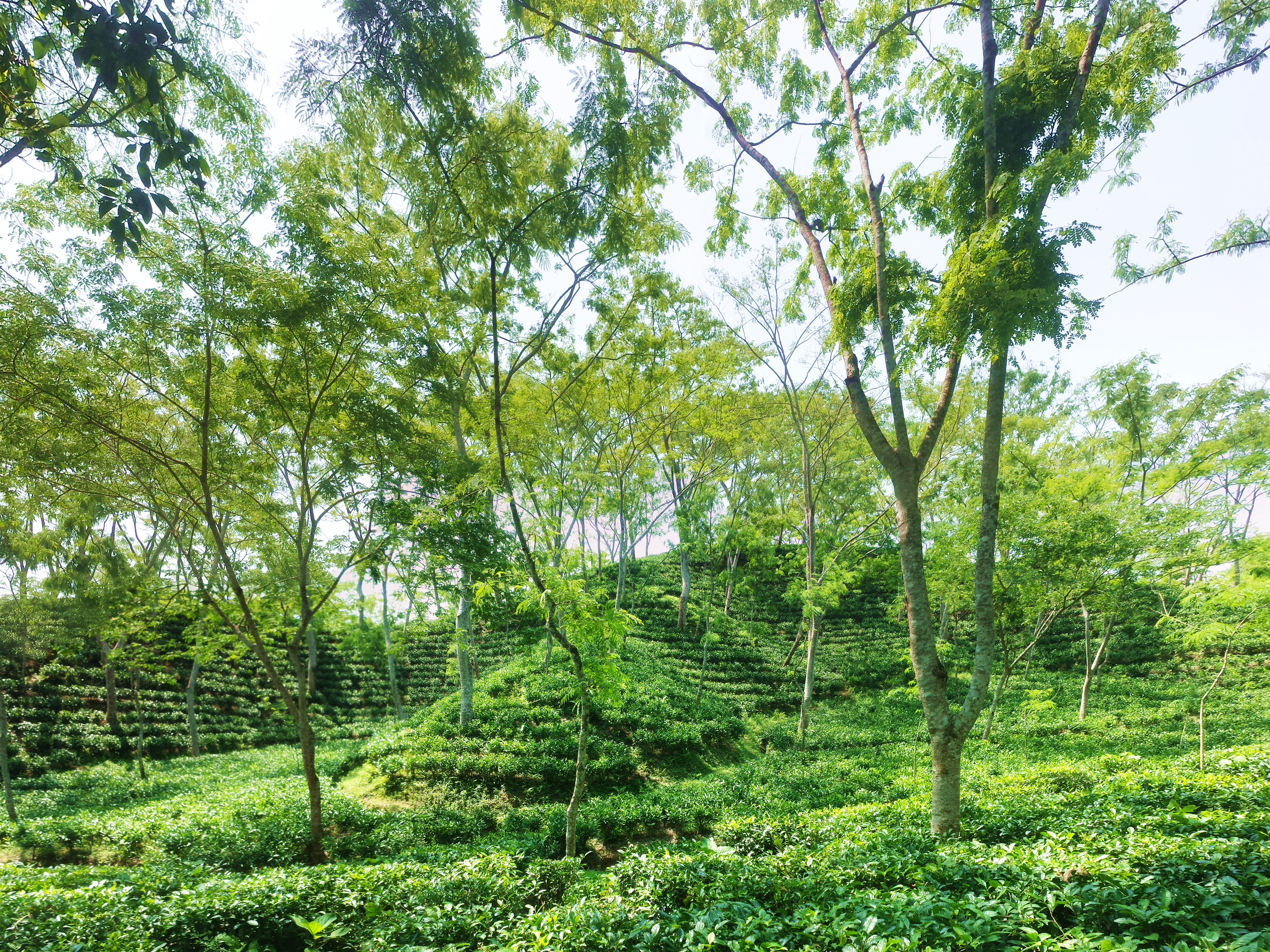
Tea garden in Sreemangal

Bangladesh is an important tea-producing country. It is the 9th largest tea producer in the world, producing a total of 97.08 million kgs in 2019. Its tea industry dates back to British rule, when the East India Company initiated the tea trade in the hills of the Sylhet region. In addition to that, tea cultivation was introduced to Greater Chittagong in 1840. Today, the country has 166 commercial tea estates, including many of the world's largest working plantations. The industry accounts for 3% of global tea production, and employs more than 4 million people.

The tea is grown in the northern and eastern districts of Bangladesh, such as in Sylhet, Panchagarh, Lalmonirhat, Thakurgaon, Dinajpur and Bandarban. The highlands, temperate climate, humidity and heavy rainfall within these districts provide a favourable ground for the production of high quality tea.

=== Coffee ===
Bangladesh currently cultivates two varieties of coffee, namely Robusta and Arabica, in large scale in the hilly districts: Bandarban, Khagrachhari, Rangamati, and Moulvibazar, while experimental cultivation takes place in Tangail, Rangpur, and Nilphamari, which feature flat terrain.

Despite meeting 95 percent of its coffee demand through imports, the country produced 55.75 tonnes of coffee on 118.3 hectares (1.183 km^{2}) of land in the fiscal year 2019–2020, with approximately 2,000 farmers engaged in coffee farming across seven districts of the country as of 2023. The government has initiated projects aimed at promoting commercial coffee cultivation by providing training to interested farmers and establishing workshops and research centres in this regard.

Coffee cultivation in independent Bangladesh, considered an emerging industry, commenced in the 1990s when the government distributed a limited number of coffee saplings to farmers in the Chittagong Hill Tracts region for experimental purposes. Subsequently, private initiatives were undertaken to commercialise coffee production. In the early 19th century, British entrepreneurs established a coffee company in Chittagong, which flourished alongside tea plantations, but faced opposition from tea-focused investors and local resistance, ultimately leading to its decline and the loss of Chittagong's coffee cultivation legacy.

=== Cashew ===
Cashew nut cultivation primarily occurs in hilly areas of Bangladesh, with ongoing efforts aimed at expanding production to plains, including areas such as Jessore District. The country produces approximately 1,500 tonnes of cashew fruits annually, engaging over 2,000 farmers in its cultivation. To encourage cashew production, the government has initiated projects and distributes free saplings among farmers.

As of 2021, there are 12 factories across the country processing approximately 300 tonnes of cashew nuts each year. According to government officials, Bangladesh imports about 5,000 tonnes of raw cashew nuts. Additionally, 700 tonnes of processed cashew nuts are brought in annually, with plans to import raw nuts in large quantities and re-export after processing.

== Edible Oil ==
Mustard oil production in Bangladesh rose by 3.35 lakh tones to 11.52 lakh tones this year, according to the agriculture ministry. Mustard oil output worth BDT 30 billion in Bangladesh.

Sunflower, soyabean, palm production is gaining popularity through pilot programs and research programs.

== Environmental issues ==
=== Insecticides ===
National sales of the classes of insecticide used on rice, including granular carbofuran, synthetic pyrethroids, and malathion exceeded 13,000 tons of formulated product in 2003. Insecticides not only represent an environmental threat, but are a significant expenditure to poor rice farmers. The Bangladesh Rice Research Institute is working with various NGOs and international organisations to reduce insecticide use in rice.

=== Climate change ===
Bangladeshi farmers have been adapting to rising water levels by making creative floating gardens which mesh water hyacinth plants with bamboo and fertilizer to provide a sturdy floating platform for agriculture, according to climate researcher Alizé Carrère.

As an agrarian society, the people of Bangladesh are greatly dependent on various forms of agriculture. It is the main source of rural jobs in the country with over 87% of people related to the agri-based economy. In 2016, according to the World Bank, agriculture contributed to 14.77% of the country's GDP. Alongside a steady increase in agricultural production with the use of modern equipment and scientific methods, agriculture has been a key driver to eradicate rural poverty in Bangladesh. The risk of sea level rise and global warming is the biggest challenge not only to the country's agricultural improvement, but also to the success of poverty reduction efforts.

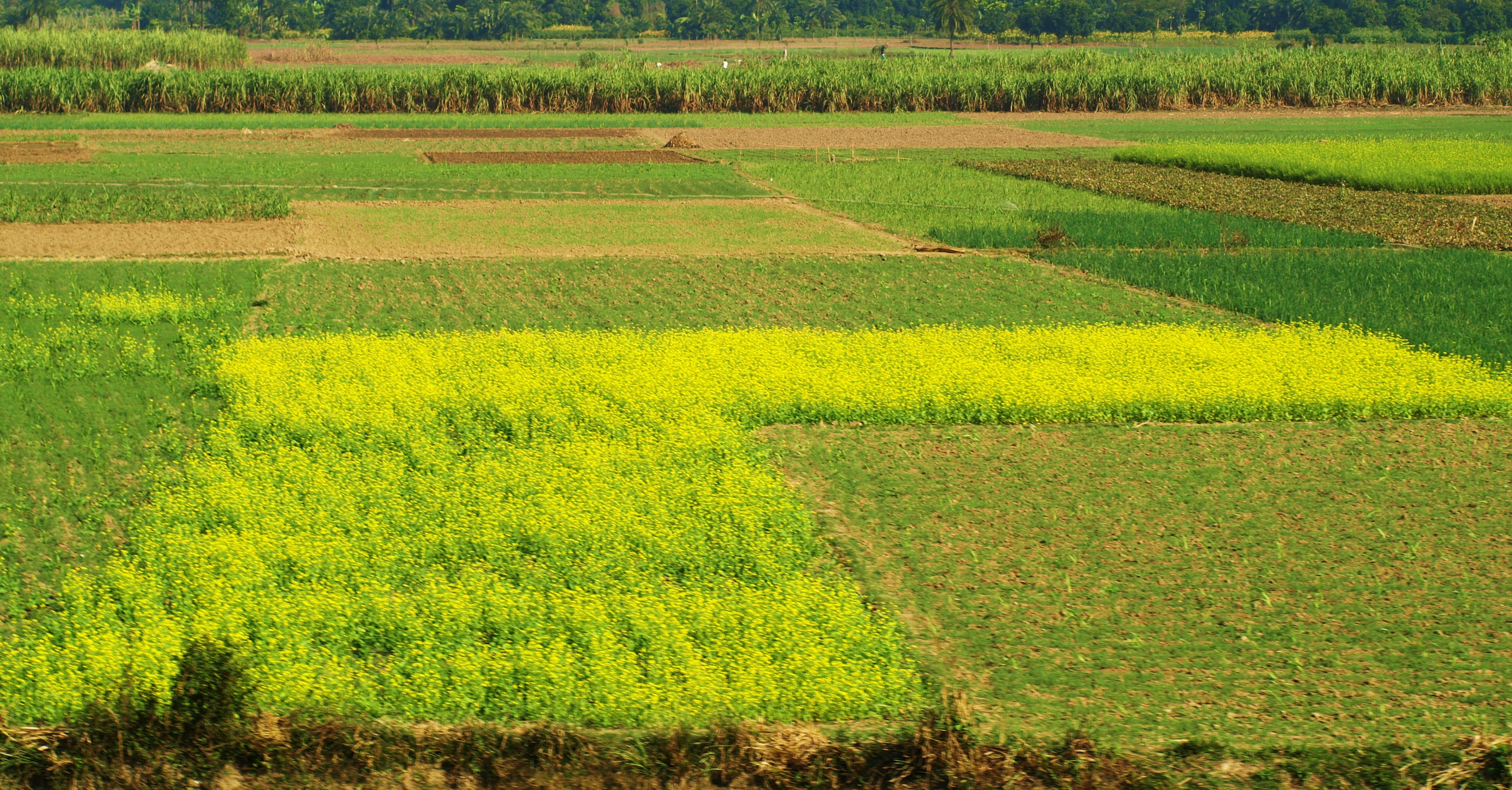
Agriculture in Bangladesh

As agricultural production is heavily related with temperature and rainfall, the current change in weather conditions is creating negative impact on crop yielding and the total area of arable land has been decreased. According to a report published by the Ministry of Environment and Forests - GoB, 1 degree Celsius increase in maximum temperature at vegetative, reproductive and ripening stages there was a decrease in Aman rice production by 2.94, 53.06 and 17.28 tons respectively. Another major threat deriving from this factor is water salinity which directly affects rice production especially in the coastal part of Bangladesh. The same report state that, the country will lose 12-16% of its land if the sea level rises by 1 meter. These challenges lead to food scarcity and insecurity for the huge populace of the country. There are several adaptation measures which are practised to help cope with abnormal climactic conditions, such as resilient varieties of crops, diversification, change in cropping pattern, mixed cropping, improved irrigation facilities, adopting soil conservation, agroforestry and so on.

A number of these measures have already been adapted by the government of Bangladesh and well practised throughout the country. The Bangladesh Rice Research Institute has introduced a varieties of saline tolerant rices like BR-11, BR-23, BRRI rice -28, BRRI rice -41, BRRI rice -47, BRRI rice -53 and BRRI rice -54. In the drought prone areas, BR-11, BR-23, BRRI rice -28, BRRI rice -41, BRRI rice -47, BRRI rice -53 and BRRI rice -54 are used which take short time to cultivate. To make the best and efficient utilization of water the Department of Agricultural Extension has introduced 'Alternate Wetting and Drying (AWD). The government also provide financial support to the affected farmers from different disasters and hazards

== Government ==
=== Ministry of Agriculture ===
The Ministry of Agriculture (Bengali: কৃষি মন্ত্রণালয়; Kr̥ṣi Mantraṇālaẏa) is a ministry of the Government of Bangladesh. It is the principal government body responsible for the formulation, implementation, and administration of policies, laws, rules, and regulations relating to Agriculture in Bangladesh.

The ministry plays a central role in ensuring food security, agricultural development, and sustainable use of agricultural resources in the country. Its functions include crop production, agricultural research and extension services, seed development, fertilizer management, irrigation coordination, pest control, and the promotion of modern farming technologies. The Ministry of Agriculture works in coordination with various attached departments, autonomous bodies, research institutions, and field-level offices to enhance agricultural productivity, support farmers’ livelihoods, and contribute to national economic growth and rural development.

== See also ==
- Poultry farming In Bangladesh
- Forestry in Bangladesh
- Fishing in Bangladesh
- Economy of Bangladesh
