= Ditylenchus destructor =

Scientific classification
- Kingdom: Animalia
- Phylum: Nematoda
- Class: Secernentea
- Order: Tylenchida
- Family: Anguinidae
- Genus: Ditylenchus
- Species: D. destructor

Binomial name
- Ditylenchus destructor Thorne, 1945

Species of roundworm

Ditylenchus destructor is a plant pathogenic nematode commonly known as the potato rot nematode. Other common names include the iris nematode, the potato tuber eelworm and the potato tuber nematode. It is an endoparasitic, migratory nematode commonly found in areas such as the United States, Europe, central Asia and Southern Africa.

== Disease cycle ==
Potato rot nematodes are microscopic worms approximately 1.4 millimeters long. Their life cycle takes place inside potato tubers where they eat starch grains. This causes the affected tissues to become brown and powdery, and the surface of the tuber becomes covered with dark patches with dry cracking skin. The nematodes live inside the living tissue where they aggregate rapidly as the fecund females each produce up to 250 eggs. They survive in stored tubers during the winter and can infect the stolons of planting material. After infection, the nematodes move throughout the plant tissue producing a pectinase enzyme, which causes cell degeneration and is the main causal agent of the rot observed. The soil plays only a secondary role in the transfer of this nematode.

The life cycle of Ditylenchus destructor lasts approximately 6 days. As Ditylenchus destructor is an endoparasite, a majority of the life cycle occurs inside the host tissue. There are four molting periods and juvenile stages of development for Ditylenchus destructor with the first juvenile stage occurring within the egg. Females deposit eggs inside the tuber from their ovaries at which point the embryos begin undergo a cleavage process, beginning the first juvenile stage. Two and a half hours later the juvenile nematode can be seen through the egg wall, and 48 hours later the first larval stage has completed and hatching occurs. Hatching marks the molting into the second juvenile stage, and development continues until the next molting. In the third juvenile stage the sexual structures begin to develop and become visible. This development of additional structures causes large amounts of growth and elongation is seen in the nematode (especially in females who have more development occur). It is in the fourth stage where the sexual structures fully develop: vaginal development in females and testes development in males. At this point the nematodes undergo their final molting and enter the final, adult stage in their life cycle. After feeding on a host for some time, the females lay eggs inside the tuber, the eggs are fertilized by a male, and the cycle repeats.

As a migratory endoparasite, Ditylenchus destructor females lay eggs throughout the plant tissue while moving from cell to cell. Once they have hatched, the juvenile nematodes will either move throughout the surrounding plant tissue or out of the plant from which they hatched to a nearby, healthy host. Ditylenchus destructor is not very mobile through soil though, so dispersal primarily occurs during harvest or transportation of the host when healthy tubers are in the immediate vicinity. If the nematodes exit the initial host, they most commonly infect the tubers of a new host; however, it is sometimes possible for them to infect the above ground parts of the plant and migrate to the tubers through the plant cells.

== Environment ==
Unlike other nematodes, Ditylenchus destructor does not have a resting form, so environmental conditions have a large impact on the habits of the organism. The most optimal conditions for the nematodes are soils that are around 28 °C. Temperatures above or below this range will inhibit the movement and life cycle of the nematode; therefore, the 28 °C range provides optimal growth conditions. Moist soils are also especially favorable for the development of the nematode as well as its movement through the soil. Given these conditions, the most opportune locations for Ditylenchus destructor are in midwestern and southern North America as well as central parts of Europe and Asia. In these areas, agricultural practices also largely influence the spread of the pathogen. When harvesting and transporting tubers, moving them in large piles allows the nematodes to move from an infected tuber to surrounding healthy ones, encouraging the spread of disease.

== Hosts and symptoms ==
In addition to potatoes, potato rot nematodes have a wide range of over 100 species of hosts from numerous families. Some of these include alfalfa, beets, carrots, garlic, hops, mint, parsnips, peanuts, rhubarb, tomatoes, and flowering plants such as irises and tulips. The nematodes only attack the below ground, non-aerial tissues of plants such as the roots, bulbs, rhizomes, and tubers.

The main symptoms of Ditylenchus destructor, common to potatoes and its other hosts, are the rotting and discoloration of subterranean plant tissue. In potatoes, early infection can be detected by small white spots underneath the potato's skin. As the disease progresses, these spots become larger and darker with a spongy or hollow appearance. Tubers develop sunken areas and the skin becomes dry, cracked, and detached from the underlying flesh. There is further discoloration at this stage that is often due to secondary invasions of fungi, bacteria, and free-living nematodes. Above ground symptoms are usually not seen, although heavily infected plants are often weaker, smaller and can have curled or discolored leaves.

Symptoms of Ditylenchus destructor on the bulbs of flowering plants such as irises and tulips are similar to those of potatoes, except infection usually occurs at the bulb's base and moves upwards. The fleshy scales develop discolored yellow to black lesions, the roots become blackened, and leaves can develop yellow tips. Potato rot nematodes in groundnuts, such as peanuts, develop blackened hulls, shrunken kernels, and embryos with a brown discoloration.

Potato rot nematodes are identified and diagnosed by various morphological and molecular methods. The morphological methods are the primary means of diagnosis, with molecular methods being used for when there is a low level of infestation or when only juveniles are present. Nematodes are extracted from infected plant tissue and examined microscopically for distinguishing characteristics such as body and stylet, and tail morphology. Molecular methods for identifying Ditylenchus destructor (especially in distinguishing from other Ditylenchus species) include PCRs (polymerase chain reactions) to find restriction patterns of DNA to identify specific species.

== Management ==
Management of Ditylenchus destructor can be achieved through various methods of preventative and chemical control. Once the nematodes have been established, they are very difficult to eradicate because of the wide range of other hosts on which they can survive. Therefore, preventative measures are generally the first means of control for potato rot nematodes. Planting materials and locations free of these nematodes is crucial, so the soil, seeds, and farm machinery must all be carefully controlled. This is done by disinfecting machinery and removing all potentially infected plant debris from farm equipment when transferring from field to field. Seeds certified to be free of Ditylenchus destructor should be planted. Crop rotation as a form of control is difficult due to the nematodes' wide host range; therefore, non-host crops must be selected carefully to use for rotation each season. Weeds must also be eradicated, as they often act as alternative hosts for potato rot nematodes.

Chemical control of Ditylenchus destructor can be achieved with soil-applied nematicides such as carbofuran, ethylene dibromide, VAPAM HL, and TELONE. Fumigation with these nematicides is often paired with mechanical measures to attain optimal control. For example, Wisconsin has eradicated these nematodes from potatoes by repeated use of ethylene dibromide and restricting the movement of infected tubers. Another management method was demonstrated by the control of potato rot nematodes in garlic. The seeds were coated with thiram or benomyl wettable powder before being planted, resulting in very good control of the disease.

== Importance ==
Ditylenchus destructor can reproduce at high rates and cause large amounts of damage to hosts and so can be very damaging to a cash crop. One of the most important impacts of Ditylenchus destructor is in South Africa, where it caused major disease amongst the peanut plantations in the early 1990s. In fields where the nematodes have been found, between 40% and 60% of the peanuts had large amounts of symptoms which heavily damaged the production levels. Similarly, the same issues were observed in Sweden in the 1970s when Ditylenchus destructor was found in their potato fields. In this instance it caused disease in between 40% and 70% of the potatoes being grown in the field where the pathogen was found. Finally, one of the more severe cases of the disease was found in Estonia in the 1960s. In this case the nematodes were only found on about 6% of the potato farms but on these farms between 70% and 90% of the potatoes exhibited severe symptoms. This high rate of disease caused immense damage to the fields that were infected and a large amount of crops were lost.

There have also been instances where the nematodes have affected areas within the United States as well. Since 1953, Wisconsin has had to quarantine multiple areas after finding Ditylenchus destructor in local potato fields. The pathogen has also been seen in Idaho where it was a major concern initially, as potatoes are a major state crop. Other states that have had Ditylenchus destructor issues include Arkansas, California, Hawaii, Indiana, New Jersey, North Carolina, Oregon, South Carolina, Virginia, Washington and West Virginia. Fortunately, the United States has used very stringent control laws to avoid any widespread or major damage similar to that seen in the past.

The complete list of countries that have been affected by Ditylenchus destructor include Azerbaijan, Bangladesh, China, India, Iran, Japan, Kazakhstan, Korea, Kyrgyzstan, Malaysia, Pakistan, Saudi Arabia, Tajikistan, Turkey, Uzbekistan, South Africa, Canada, Mexico, United States, Haiti, Ecuador, Peru, Albania, Austria, Belarus, Belgium, Bulgaria, Czech Republic, Estonia, Finland, France, Germany, Greece, Hungary, Ireland, Italy, Latvia, Lithuania, Luxembourg, Moldova, Netherlands, Norway, Poland, Romania, Russia, Slovakia, Span, Sweden, Switzerland, Ukraine, United Kingdom, Australia, and New Zealand.
