= Poultry farming in Bangladesh =

Poultry farming in Bangladesh is the process of keeping various types of birds for meat, egg, feather, or sale. In Bangladesh, poultry birds are primarily used for meat and egg consumption.

The weather in Bangladesh is perfect for raising poultry, with several types of poultry birds having been domesticated for many years. As of 2017, about 300 billion taka was invested in the poultry industry, with an estimated 150,000 poultry farms in Bangladesh. From 2 to 4 March 2017, Poultry Science Association Bangladeshi branch held the tenth International Poultry Show and Seminar in Bashundhara Convention centre, Dhaka, Bangladesh. By 2019, significant further investments were noted in the sector. The farms produce 570 million tonnes of meat and 7.34 billion eggs annually. Poultry feed is primarily made from imported soybean and soy meal. The per capita consumption of meat and egg in Bangladesh remains below the level recommended by the Food and Agriculture Organization. The impact of Avian Influenza in 2007 and the COVID-19 pandemic has been detrimental to the poultry and associated feed industry in Bangladesh. The outbreak in 2007 resulted in the closure of two-thirds of all farms in Bangladesh. In March 2023, poultry farmers urged the government to set chicken and egg prices for the local market, highlighting the industry's significance in the country's economy Notable figures in the poultry sector include Late Syed Hedayetullah and Phanindra Nath Saha, who developed the poultry sector with Aftab Bahumukhi Farms.

== Present condition ==
The most widely used poultry for meat are Broilers Chicken and for egg are Layers Chicken.

== Domesticated birds ==
The most widely domesticated birds in Bangladesh are:

- Chicken
- Duck
- Goose
- Muskovy
- Pigeon

== Other species ==
Nowadays some birds are added to Bangladesh poultry and their popularity are growing day by day. They are:

- Quail
- Turkey
- Guinea Fowl
- Ostrich
- Emu

== See also ==
- Agriculture in Bangladesh
- Agriculture
