= Energy policy of Bangladesh =

Bangladesh suffers with heavy energy crisis with the gradual expansion of economic activities of the country. The estimations and reserves of energy resources show future potentials but a small fraction of them are being utilized which proved to be insufficient. Moreover, the impact of climate change and environment pollution has also been significantly felt. As a result, the successive governments have aimed at formulating an effective energy policy which would address these concerns. The energy policies have also received extensive criticisms especially on the questions of energy export and methods of extraction.

Bangladesh’s first National Energy Policy (NEP) was formulated in 1996 by the Ministry of Power, Energy and Mineral Resources to promote the efficient exploration, production, distribution, and sustainable use of energy resources to meet the growing demand across various regions, sectors, and consumer groups. With rapid change of global as well as domestic situation, the policy was updated in 2004. The updated policy included additional objectives namely to ensure environmentally sound sustainable energy development programmes causing minimum damage to environment, to encourage public and private sector participation in the development and management of energy sector and to bring the entire country under electrification by the year 2020.

Government-owned companies in Bangladesh produce about half of the electricity generated there. The country produced 5 gigawatts in 2009 to around 25.5 gigawatts in 2022 and plan to produce up to 50 gigawatts by 2041. U.S. companies supply around 55% of Bangladesh's domestic natural gas production and are among the largest investors in power projects. 80% of Bangladesh's installed gas-fired power generation capacity comes from turbines manufactured in the United States.

On 4 October 2022 70-80% of the countries 168 million residence were hit with blackouts and only 45% of residences were restored with power by nightfall. There was a shortage of natural gas because of the 2021–present global energy crisis where 77 natural gas power plants had insufficient fuel to meet demand. The electricity sector in Bangladesh is heavily reliant on natural gas. The government stopped buying spot price Liquefied natural gas in June 2022, they were importing 30% of their LNG on the spot market this year down from 40% last year. They are still importing LNG on futures exchange markets. The Government of Bangladesh subsidized energy and LNG imports of $4.6 billion last fiscal year and plan to spend $9.4 billion this fiscal year, they are putting tariffs on the imports of LNG to try to help subsidize the expensive cost. Since October 2021 they have been importing LNG for between US$30–37 per million Btu which is 10 times the price they were paying May 2020.

== History ==
The first National Energy Policy (NEP) of Bangladesh was formulated in 1996 by the Ministry of Power, Energy and Mineral resources to ensure proper exploration, production, distribution and rational use of energy resources to meet the growing energy demands of different zones, consuming sectors and consumers groups on a sustainable basis. With rapid change of global as well as domestic situation, the policy was updated in 2004. The updated policy included additional objectives namely to ensure environmentally sound sustainable energy development programmes causing minimum damage to environment, to encourage public and private sector participation in the development and management of energy sector and to bring the entire country under electrification by the year 2020.

== Energy resources ==
=== Natural gas ===
Natural gas accounts for about 70% of the country's commercial energy supply. According to a study conducted in 2003 by Hydrocarbon unit of the Energy and Mineral Resources Division and Norwegian Petroleum Directorate, the initial gas reserve of the 22 discovered gas fields of the country amounts to 28.4 trillion cubic feet (TCF) out of which 20.5 TCF is considered recoverable. In 2000, United States Geological Survey conducted a study for undiscovered gas reserve of the country. According this study, there are possibilities to explore another 32 TCF of natural gas. Another study conducted by Hydrocarbon Unit and Norwegian Petroleum Directorate in 2001 concluded that additional 42 TCF of natural gas could be discovered in the country.

In recent years, experts have raised concerns that the existing proven reserves could be extirpated by 2020 and have called for immediate exploration of new gas fields.

=== Coal ===
Bangladesh has a reserve of approximately 3 billion tons of steam grade Bituminous coal as discovered till 2003. These reserves are mainly concentrated into the five large coal fields in the northwestern regions of the country, namely Jamalganj, Barapukuria, Khalashpir, Dighipara and Phulbari.

== Energy conservation ==
The NEP called for conservation measures to be strictly enforced to ensure rational, economic and efficient use of energy. The major means of energy conservation have been pointed out as energy audit, reduction of wastage, demand management and efficient use. Experts have suggested to initiate the energy conservation act, which would significantly reduce the energy demand of the country.
