= Ditylenchus africanus =

Peanut pod nematode

Scientific classification
- Domain: Eukaryota
- Kingdom: Animalia
- Phylum: Nematoda
- Class: Secernentea
- Order: Tylenchida
- Family: Anguinidae
- Genus: Ditylenchus
- Species: D. africanus

Binomial name
- Ditylenchus africanus Wendt, Swart, Vrain & Webster, 1995

Species of roundworm

Ditylenchus africanus (Peanut pod nematode) is a plant pathogenic nematode.
