= Ditylenchus angustus =

Rice stem nematode

Scientific classification
- Kingdom: Animalia
- Phylum: Nematoda
- Class: Secernentea
- Order: Tylenchida
- Family: Anguinidae
- Genus: Ditylenchus
- Species: D. angustus

Binomial name
- Ditylenchus angustus (Buther, 1913) Filipjev, 1936

Species of nematode

Ditylenchus angustus, the rice stem nematode, is a plant pathogenic nematode.
