= Bangladesh Rice Research Institute =

Agricultural research institute in Bangladesh

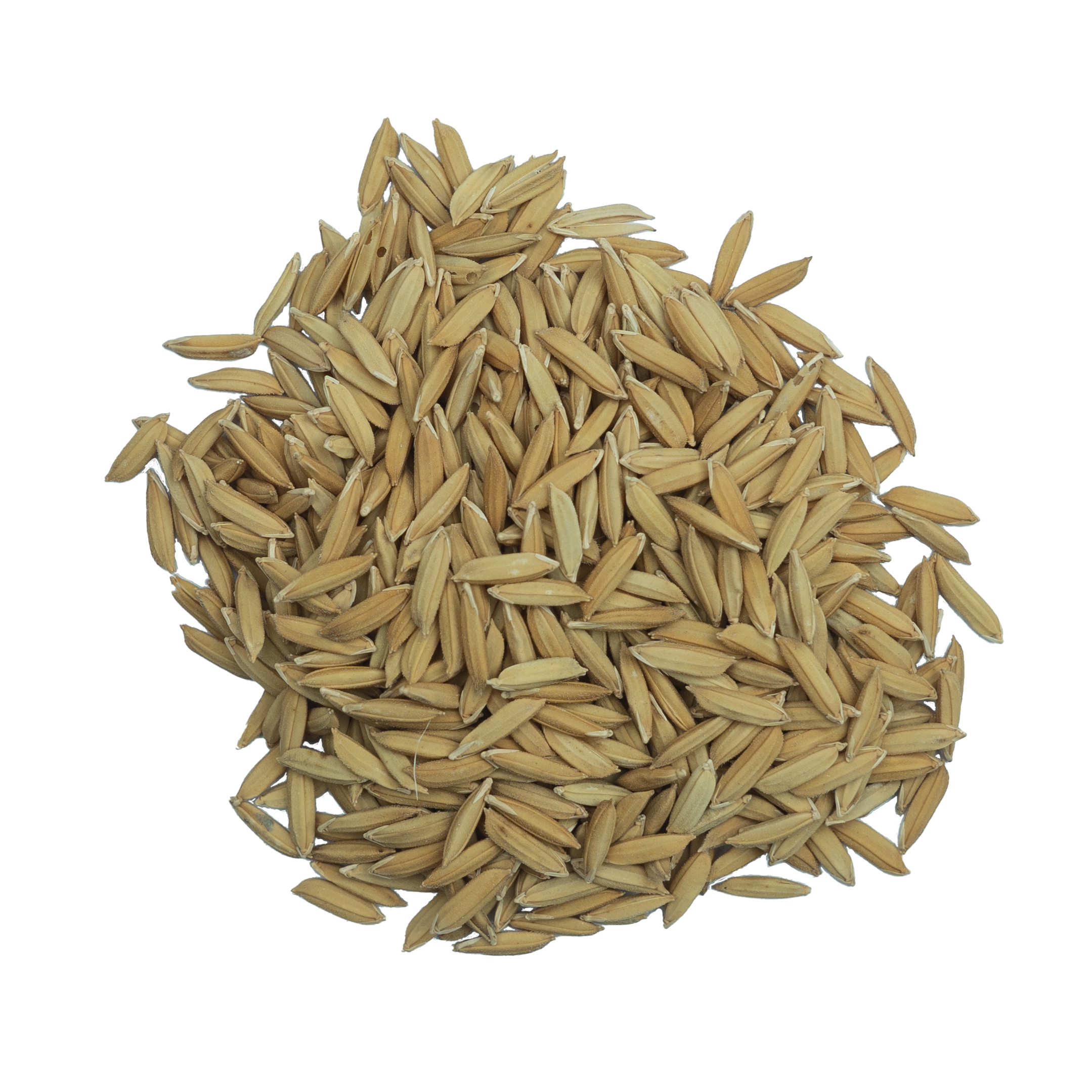
- BRRI Dhan26
- Abbreviation: BRRI
- Formation: 1970
- Type: Autonomous government organisation
- Headquarters: Gazipur
- Coordinates: 23°59′29.3″N 90°24′25.2″E
- Region served: Bangladesh
- Official language: Bengali
- Director General: Dr. Mohammad Khalequzzaman
- Main organ: board
- Parent organization: Ministry of Agriculture, Bangladesh
- Budget: ৳1.1 billion (US$9.0 million) (2022–2023)
- Staff: 786 (2023)
- Website: Bangladesh Rice Research Institute
- Formerly called: East Pakistan Rice Research Institute

Bangladesh Rice Research Institute (BRRI, Bengali: বাংলাদেশ ধান গবেষণা ইনস্টিটিউট) is an agricultural research institute in Bangladesh, headquartered in Gazipur. The organisation focuses on researching and developing methods to improve the production of rice.

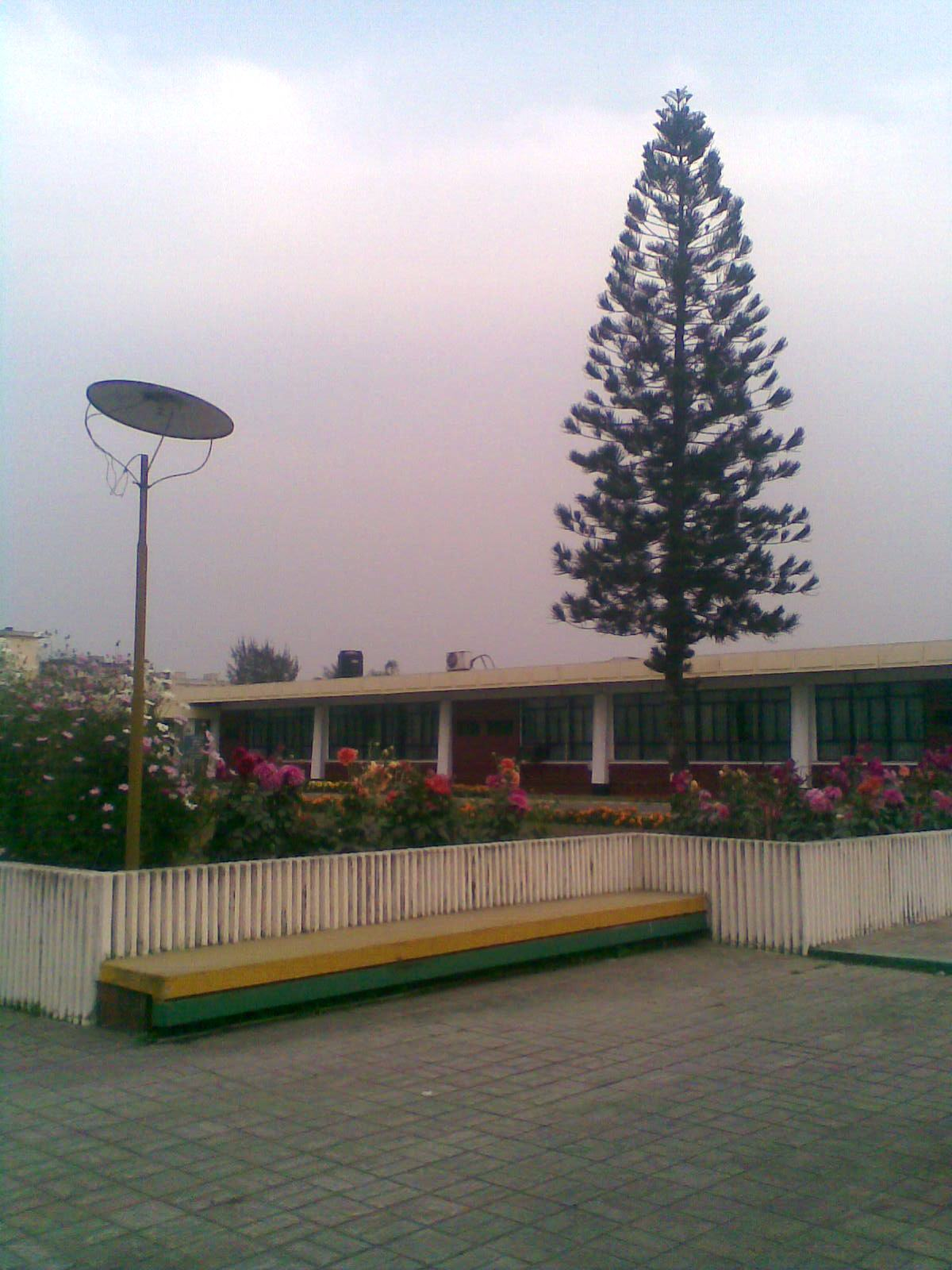
Bangladesh Rice Research Institute

== Origins ==
The East Pakistan Rice Research Institute (EPRRI) was established on 1 October 1970 as an autonomous organisation with the primary objective of conducting research aimed at developing rice varieties with desirable characteristics and their corresponding management technologies tailored to diverse ecosystems. Following the independence of Bangladesh in 1971, the organisation, set up under the Ministry of Agriculture, was renamed the Bangladesh Rice Research Institute (BRRI) through a parliamentary act. Besides the headquarters at Joydebpur in Gazipur, 36 square kilometres (14 sq mi) north of Dhaka, the BRRI has set up 17 regional stations to conduct location-specific research all over the country.

== Structure ==
The BRRI is overseen by a 13-member Board of Management, chaired by the Director General. The Director General is supported by two directors, one responsible for research and the other for administration and finance. As of 2023, the organisation has a total staff of 786 individuals, including 308 scientists. In 2024, Dr. Mohammad Khalequzzaman was appointed the Director General.

== Locations ==
The institute has established 17 regional stations across various agro-ecological zones (AEZ) in Bangladesh. These stations, dedicated to addressing the challenges and opportunities associated with rice production in diverse agro-ecological conditions, are located in the districts of Comilla, Habiganj, Feni (Sonagazi Upazila), Faridpur (Bhanga Upazila), Barisal, Rajshahi, Rangpur, Kushtia, Satkhira, Sirajganj, Gopalganj, Dinajpur, Netrokona, Tangail, Cox's Bazar, Khagrachari and Sunamganj.

== Funding ==
As of the 2022–23 fiscal year, the institute had an allocated budget of approximately ৳1.1 billion (US$9.0 million), up from ৳785 million (US$6.4 million) in 2012–13. Additionally, BRRI receives aid grants, to support its research activities, from various organisations and sources such as the Asian Development Bank (ADB), Bill & Melinda Gates Foundation, International Rice Research Institute, the United Nations, and agencies from countries like Canada, UK, Japan, USA, Korea and Norway.

== Research and development ==
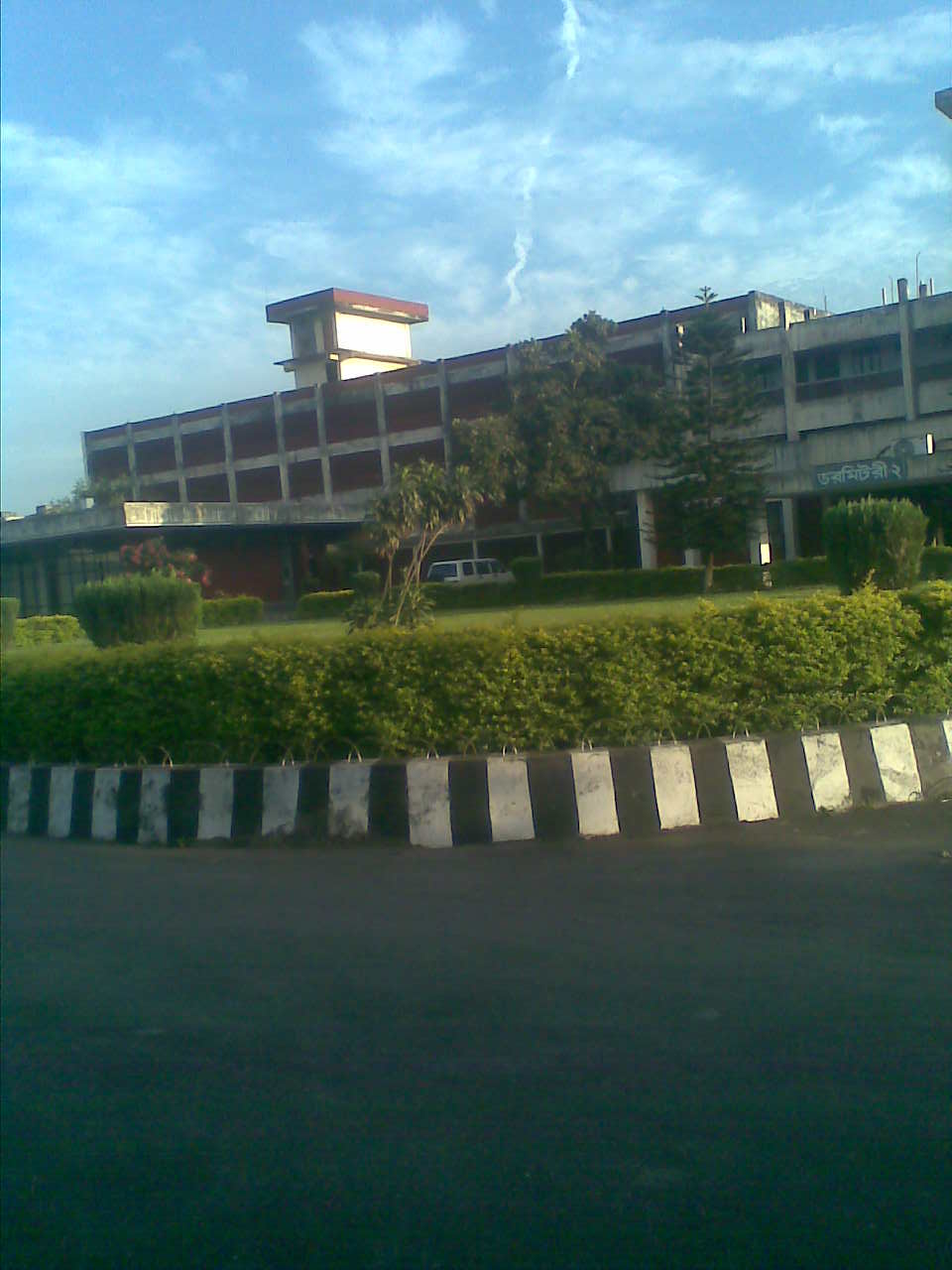
2nd building of the institute

The BRRI comprises 18 research divisions, each dedicated to various disciplines. Research activities are conducted under seven program areas, which encompass varietal development, crop-soil-water management, pest management, rice-based farming systems, farm mechanization, socio-economics and policy, and technology transfer.

During the country's early years, the organisation introduced a high-yielding rice variety known as BR-3. This variety quickly proliferated nationwide, becoming the staple crop across all three cropping seasons of Aus, Aman, and Boro, hence earning the moniker "BR-revolution."

In 2017, the institute developed a bio-organic fertiliser primarily utilising decomposable household vegetable waste. This breakthrough is anticipated to reduce the use of harmful urea and subsidies for fertiliser production, while also promoting environmentally friendly practices.

As of 2021, scientists at the BRRI have made significant progress in developing new types of rice using gene editing. These rice varieties are designed to be more resistant to diseases and insects, as well as better able to tolerate high salinity. They are also working on using gene editing to improve the yield and aroma of hybrid and aromatic rice varieties. BRRI is also collaborating with the Philippine Rice Research Institute and the Indonesian Center for Rice Research to develop golden rice versions of popular rice varieties using these techniques. These new rice types will have the same yield, resistance to pests, and grain quality as existing varieties but will also contain added nutrients.

In 2024, two high-yielding varieties of rice suitable for the Boro season developed by the institute were approved for release.

Since its inception, the organisation has developed 115 rice varieties, including 41 varieties of Aman rice.

== See also ==
- Rice production in Bangladesh
- International Rice Research Institute
- Bangladesh Agricultural Research Institute
