= Ahmed Rafiq =

Bangladeshi writer (1929–2025)

- আহমদ রফিক
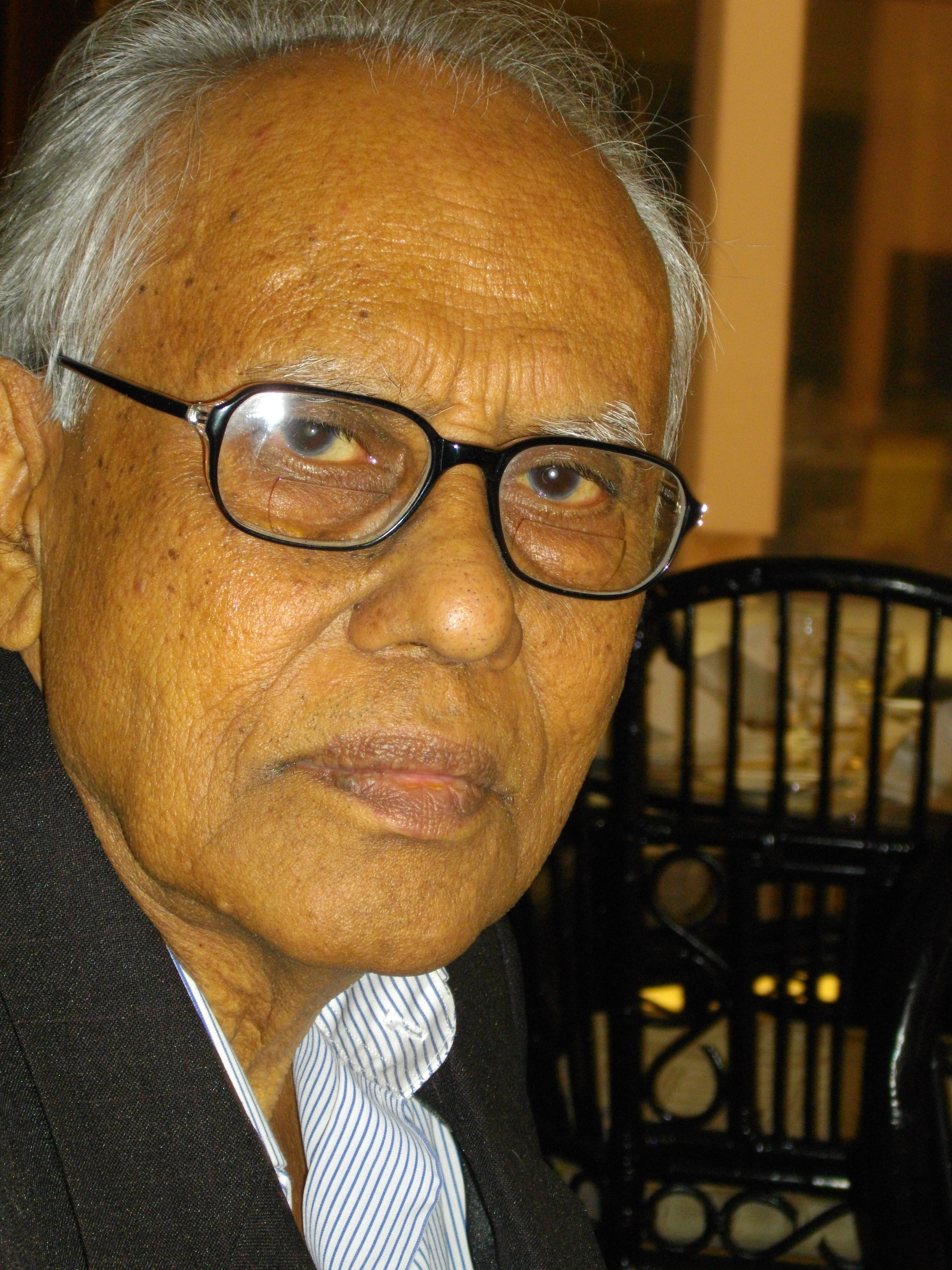
- Rafiq in 2009
- Born: 12 September 1929; Shahbazpur, Sarail, Tipperah District, Bengal Presidency, British India
- Died: 2 October 2025 (aged 96); Dhaka, Bangladesh
- Occupations: Activist, writer, researcher

Ahmed Rafiq (12 September 1929 – 2 October 2025) was a Bangladeshi language movement activist, writer and researcher on Rabindranath Tagore and his literature. He achieved Ekushey Padak in 1995 by the Government of Bangladesh. Tagore Research Institute in Kolkata conferred the Rabindratattacharya title on him in 2011.

== Life and career ==
Rafiq was born on 12 September 1929 to Bengali Muslim parents Abdul Hamid and Rahima Khatun in the village of Shahbazpur in Sarail, then part of the Brahmanbaria subdivision of the Bengal Province's Tipperah District. He completed his MBBS from Dhaka Medical College in 1958. He published his book of poems Nirbashita Nayak (1996) and book of essays Onek Ronger Akash (1966). He became a fellow of Bangla Academy and lifelong member of Asiatic Society of Bangladesh.

== Death ==
Rafiq died in Dhaka on 2 October 2025, at the age of 96.

== Awards ==
- Bangla Academy Literary Award (1979)
- Olokto Literature Award (1992)
- Ekushey Padak (1995)
- Bangla Academy Rabindra Award (2011)
- "Swadesh e Rabindra" from the Tagore Research Institute in Kolkata (2011)

== Works ==
- Shishuder Rabindranath
- Kishorder Rabindranath
- Nirbachita Rabindranath
