= Haripur Barabari =

Palace in Bangladesh

- হরিপুর বড়বাড়ি

General information
- Coordinates: 24°6′21.41″N 91°15′26.34″E
- Completed: 18th Century
- Landlord: Krishna Prasad Roy Choudhury

Haripur Barabari (Bengali: হরিপুর বড়বাড়ি) or Haripur Zamindar Bari (Bengali: হরিপুর জমিদার বাড়ি) is a palace in Horipur Union of Nasirnagar Upazila at Brahmanbaria District, Bangladesh earlier part of former British Bengal. This palace was founded by Jamindar Krishna Prasad Roy Choudhury(1870–1936) in the eighteenth century. This palace stands for the witness of Zamindar system of tax exploitation.

== Location ==
Haripur Barabari stands at the east of the Titas. This is known as Horipur Jamindarbari (Bengali: হরিপুর জমিদারবাড়ি) or Horipur Rajbari (Bengali: হরিপুর রাজবাড়ি). This is at the west of the village and south-east 15 kilometres (9.3 mi) afar from Nasirnagar, on the way to Madhabpur Upazila. Especially in the rainy season water fulfills everywhere then beauty of the palace increases.

== Constriction ==
Haripur Barabari is a multi domed three stored building. Area and stylish architecture implies the historical craft, architecture and structural perfection. This palace boundary acquires nearly 5 acres of high land with 60 chambers including Theater, Darbar Hall, Store house, Cowsheds, Kitchen, Casino, Play ground, Pagoda, Temple, small pond etc. Six stare cases are at six side of the palace for first floor and two stare cases for second floor. Six bedrooms at the north-west, four at the east and four at the west side of the pond. There is a big brick build wharf(Bengali: সান বাঁধানো ঘাট) at the west of the palace that falls on the river and both sides decorated by pagodas of Krishna Prasad Roy Choudhury at the north and Gouri Prasad Roy at the south. People of this area used river route for communication and comfortable journey and most probably wharf kept as the main gate for the same purpose.

== History ==
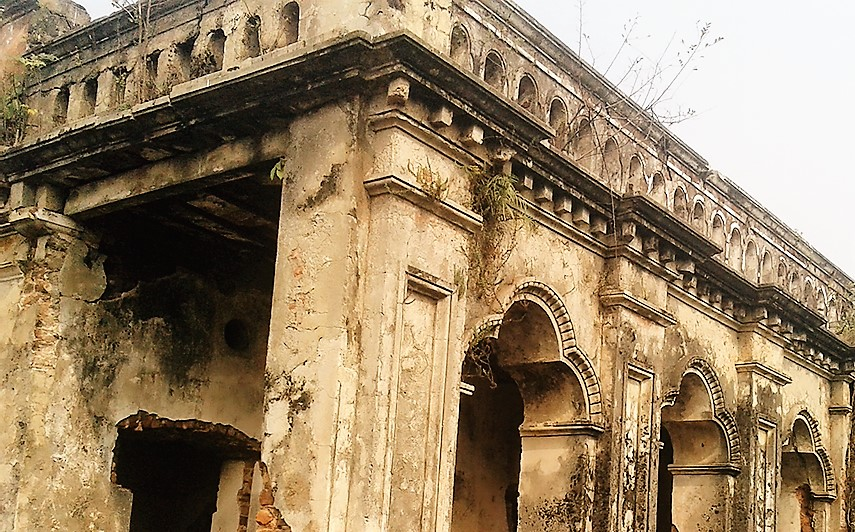
Roof

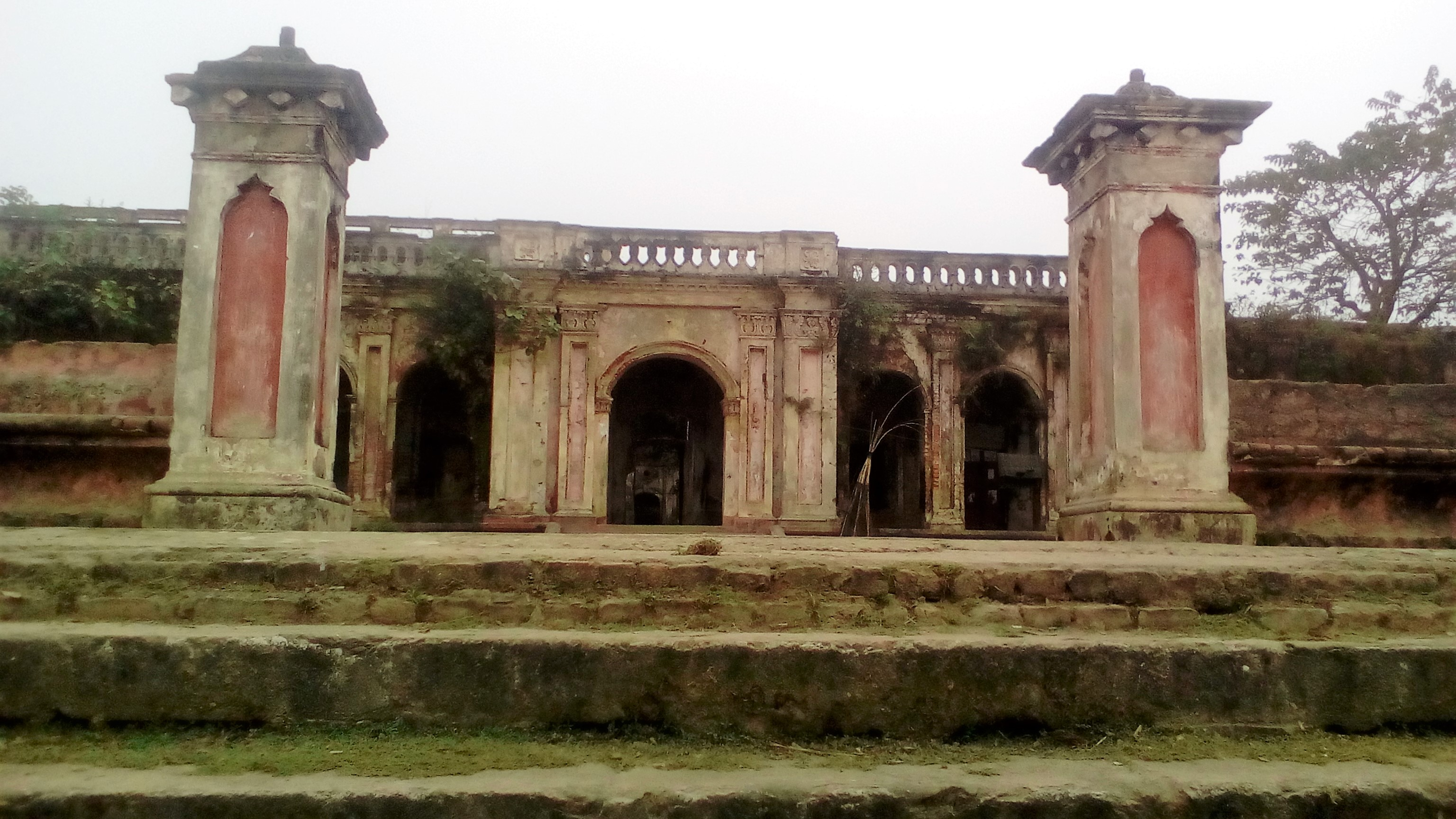
Main gate

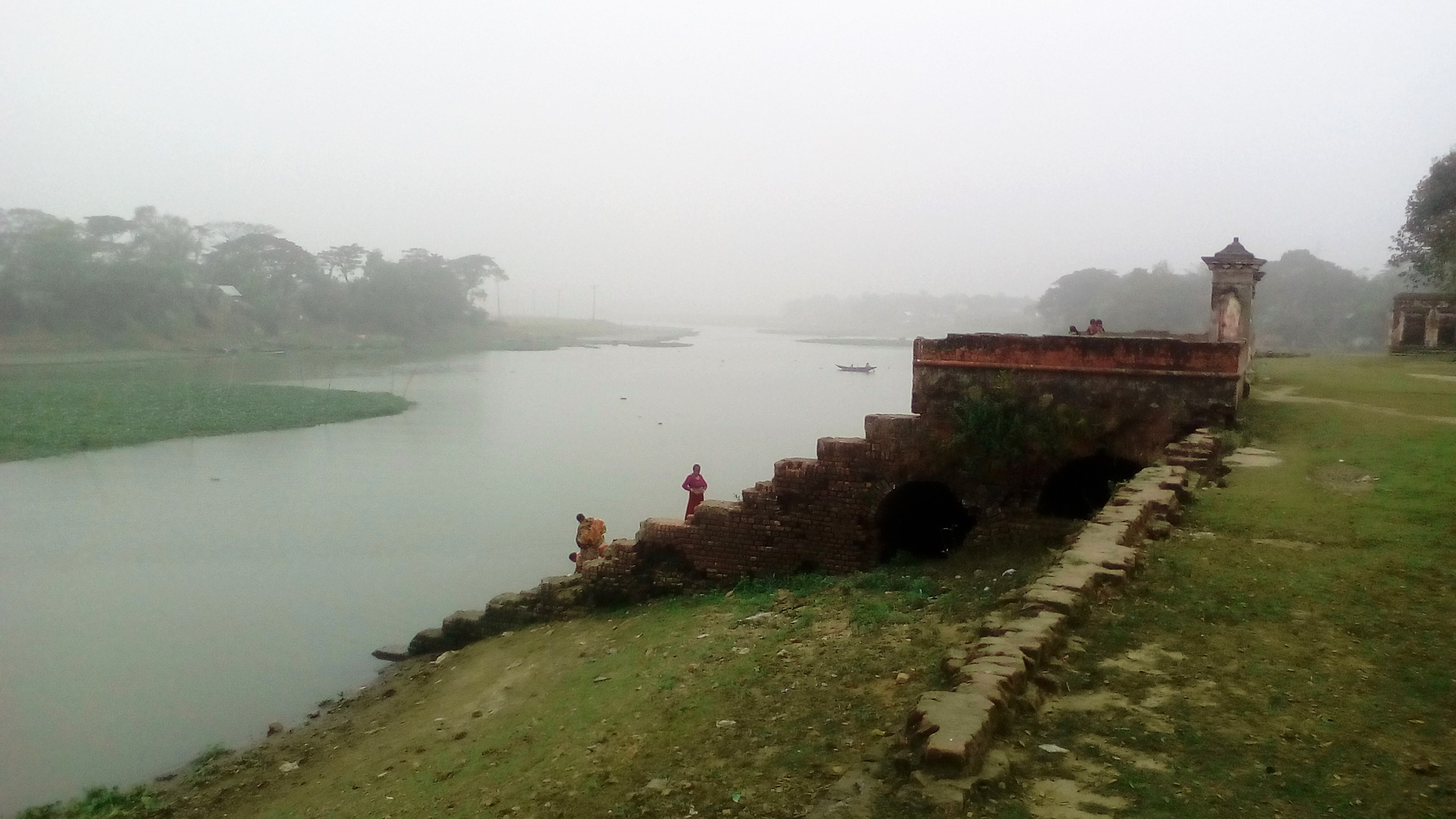
Wharf

Haripur landlords were influential landlords and successors of Tripura district. British Period Hindu Zaminds got the power to collect revenue. Zaminders compete to discover a crucial squishing system to collect tax by their soldiers.

People of Sunamganj(Bengali: সুনামগঞ্জ), Chhatak(Bengali: ছাতক), Dowarabazar(Bengali: দোয়ারাবাজার) and Ajmirigonj(Bengali: আজমিরিগঞ্জ) paid tax to the landlords. They have good relations with landlords of Guniauk another village of Nasirnagar Upazila. After the partition of 1947 the landlords left the palace and went to Kolkata and may have settled in sudden parts of Tripura. Historical boat race started from this place. Many parts of the palace are damaged but still existing a 'Pasha Board' on the second floor used to play Pasha with their mates. Dance floor for entertainment by the Dancers (Bengali: বাইজী, Baijee) performed every night.

Presently, a part of descendant is living only at the ground floor and practices religious culture. Haripur Barabari is now under care of the Department of Archaeology, Bangladesh.

== Shooting spot ==
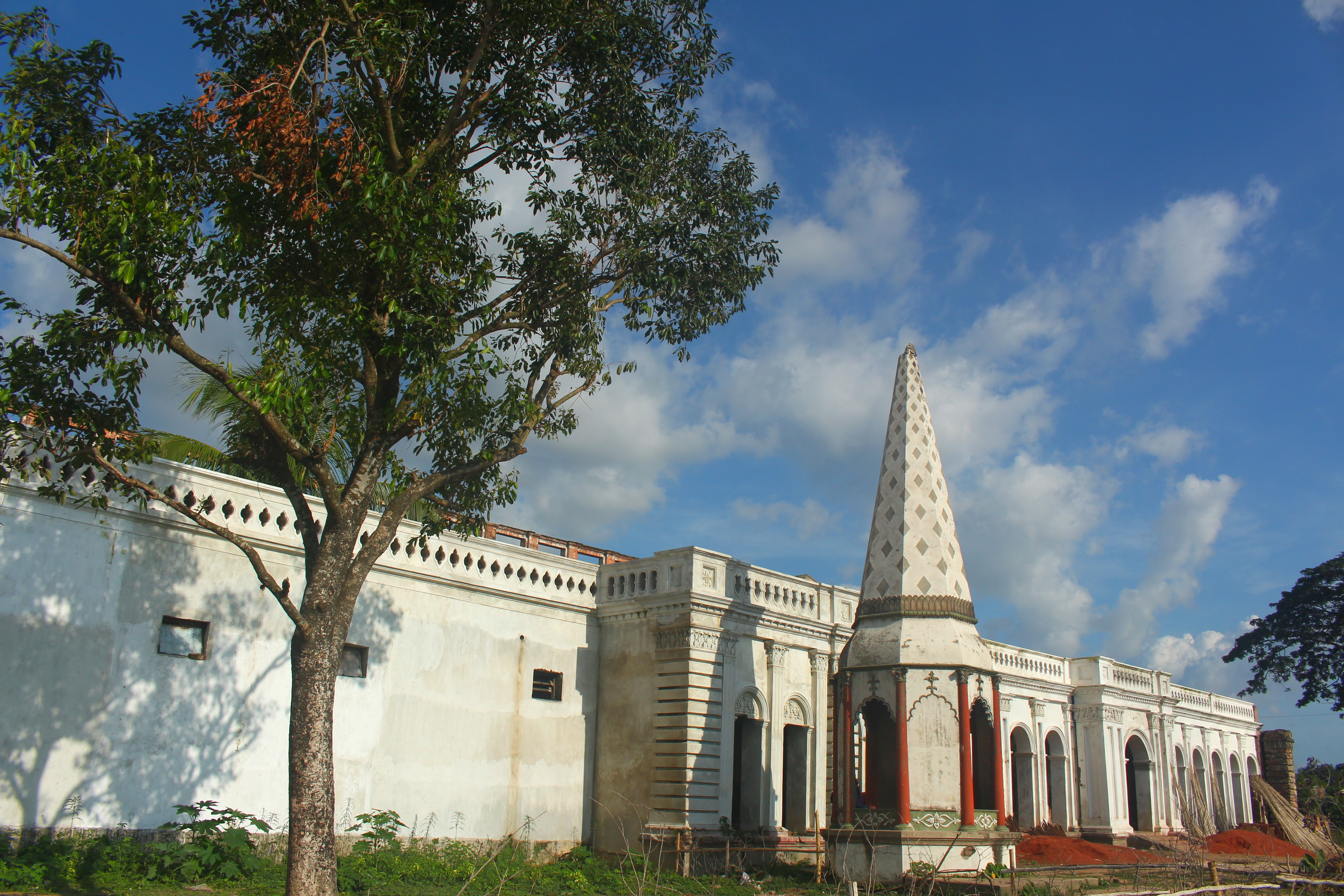
Haripur Zamindar Bari

Natural beauty attracts tourists. Writers come here to see the beauty and complete their script. Producers spotted many Dramas, Movies, and Telefilms in this place. Villagers wormly welcome the travellers. Villagers feel proud to participate willingly in the drama or telefilms.

This area is known for Bengali cultural activists. The greatest attraction of the place is enjoying the sunset. Although this is not the sea people feel the same to see sunset from the bank of the palace. Boatman sings coras with the melodic roar of the blade run through river touching the heart of the tourists.

During filming, the palace was decorated. Toukir Ahmed, Bipasha Hayat, Azizul Hakim, Al-Mamun Al Siyam, Rawshan Ara, Jayanta Chattopadhyay, and Khan Asifur Rahman Agoon, along with other actors and singers, have visited or filmed at the location.

Archeological society can take care of the palace to save it.

Name	Category	Year	Producer
Madhu malati (Bengali: মধু মালতি)	Bengali Full Movie	1999	Narayan Chandra Ghosh, India
Naioree (Bengali: নাইওরী)	Bengali Telefilm	2001	Shakoor Majid, Bangladesh
Ghetuputra Komola (Bengali: ঘেটুপুত্র কমলা)	Bengali Telefilm (by Humayun Ahmed)	2012	Faridur Reza Sagar, Bangladesh
