= Dewan Mahbub Ali =

- দেওয়ান মাহবুব আলী

Member of the East Bengal Legislative Assembly
- In office 1954–1958
- Constituency: Comilla-XI

Personal details
- Born: 1924 Sarail, Bengal Presidency, British India
- Died: 4 June 1971 (aged 46–47) Delhi, India
- Party: BNAP
- Other political affiliations: NAP(W) (1967–1971); NAP (1957–1967); GD (1953–1957)
- Education: University of Dhaka
- Nickname: Qutub Mian

Dewan Mahbub Ali (Bengali: দেওয়ান মাহবুব আলী; 1924–1971) was a lawyer and leftist politician. He was elected to the East Bengal Legislative Assembly for Comilla-XI in 1954 as a Ganatantri Dal candidate.

== Biography ==
=== Early life ===
Dewan Mahbub Ali was born in 1924 in Sarail, Bengal Presidency, British India. He was member of Dewan family. He graduated from the Islamic College of Calcutta in 1944. He completed an M.A. and a B.L. at the University of Dhaka.

In December 1951, Ali was a member of the East Pakistan Youth League, a youth party that had been established earlier that year. The party played a significant role in the Bengali language movement in 1952.

Adamjee Jute Mills started production in 1951 with 300 full-time workers. Wages were low, and living conditions were poor. Trade union organizing was strictly forbidden in the mill area. Nevertheless, around 1952, with several others, Ali formed the Adamjee Jute Workers Union. He was made general secretary. Mill management had preemptively registered an organization with the same name, so the new union shortly changed their name to Adamjee Jute Mill Mazdur Union. It attracted workers and led them out on strike twice in the first year, achieving improved overtime pay.

=== Political career ===
Ali became joint secretary of the Ganatantri Dal, a political party that was established in January 1953.

He lived in Sarail, in that period in Tipperah district, East Bengal, Dominion of Pakistan (now in Brahmanbaria District, Bangladesh). He was elected to the East Bengal Legislative Assembly for Comilla-XI in the 1954 provincial election.

When police in Dhaka went on strike in November 1955 demanding better pay, troops took over policing. Several days into the strike, they arrested Ali, along with over 100 other political activists. They were detained without trial "in the interest of the maintenance of law and order". He had been freed by May 1956.

Ali was a founding member of the left-wing National Awami Party (NAP), which was established in July 1957. On 23 September 1958, he moved a motion of no-confidence against the speaker of the Provincial Assembly of East Pakistan, Abdul Hakeem. The motion carried. This led to a heated debate in the assembly hall. It turned violent; members threw chairs at each other and used anything at hand as a weapon. Shahid Ali, the deputy speaker, was hit in the head and died a few days later.

In the 1965 East Pakistani elections, he stood for the provincial assembly seat of Comilla-I. He finished a distant third.

Ali was part of the pro-Moscow faction within the NAP. In December 1967, they split from the pro-Beijing majority of the party, forming a parallel East Pakistan NAP. He was elected a vice president of the party. In November 1968, he was appointed general secretary of the East Pakistan NAP (pro-Moscow).

By 1968, he had been imprisoned three times during his political career. He was arrested again in connection with the 1969 East Pakistan mass uprising. After being detained for ten days, he was released in February 1969.

In 1970, Ali ran unsuccessfully for the National Assembly of Pakistan seat of Comilla-I. The Awami League (AL) swept East Pakistan. Ali placed third, receiving 58,899 fewer votes than the AL candidate, Taheruddin Thakur.

In April 1971, the Bangladesh government-in-exile in Calcutta sent Ali to Europe. He was one of a team of three, led by special envoy Abdus Samad Azad. They were to rally foreign support for Bangladesh in the Bangladesh Liberation War at the World Peace Conference in Budapest in May.

=== Death and legacy ===
Ali died at Delhi airport on 4 June 1971, on his way back from the World Peace Conference. In June 2025, a mural portrait of Ali was installed at the Sarail Upazila Parishad complex.
