= Ashuganj =

Town in Bangladesh

Coordinates: 24°02′N 91°00′E

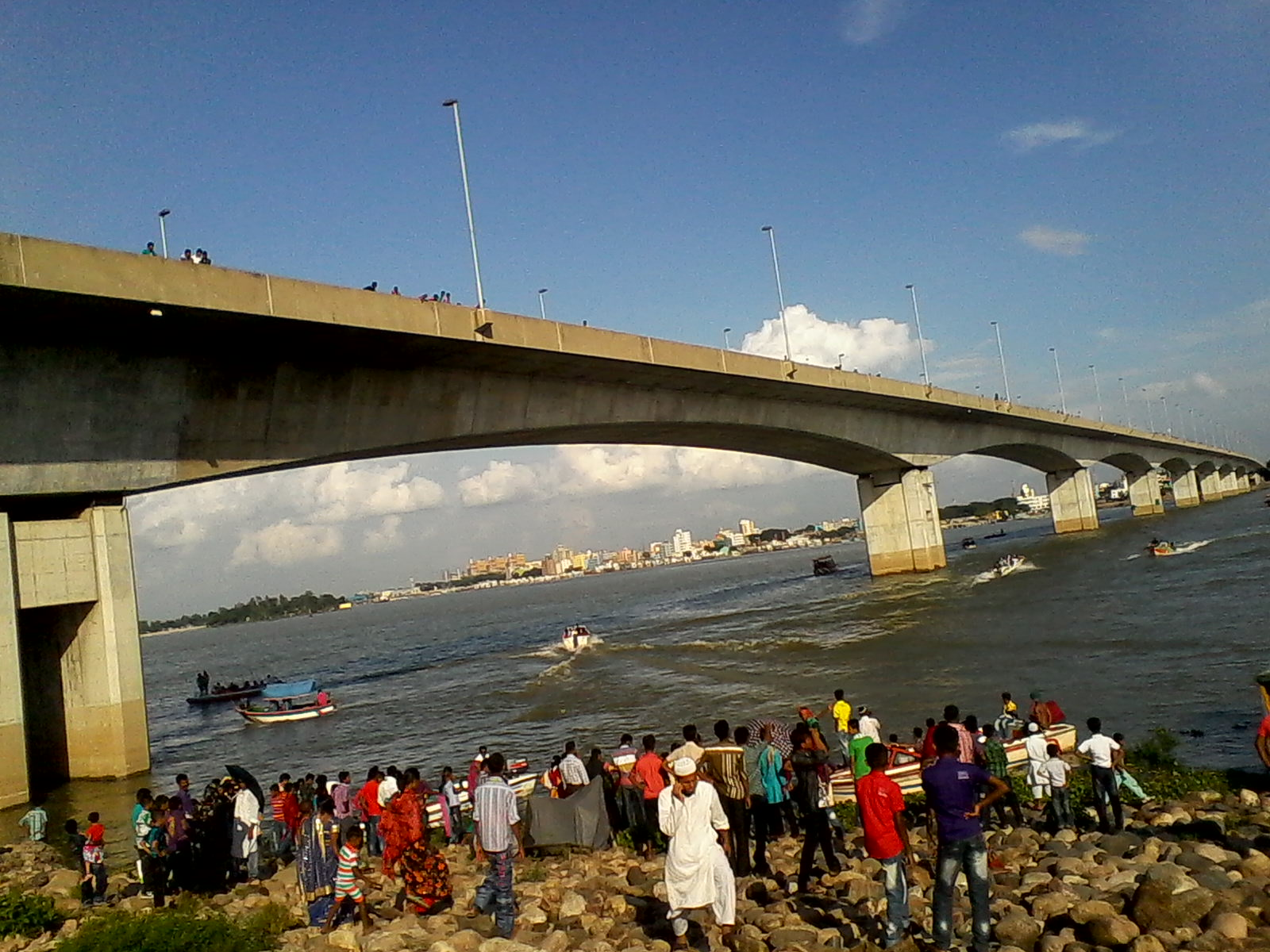

Ashuganj or Ashugonj (Bengali: আশুগঞ্জ) is a town in Brahmanbaria District of Chittagong Division, Bangladesh in Meghna River delta. Its altitude is 10 meters (36 feet).

The city is known for the Port of Ashuganj and for its power plant which generates much of the electricity for the country, especially for the capital city. Almost 25% of Bangladesh's electrical generation is produced in Ashuganj Power Station. Zia Fertilizer Ltd is on the other side of Ashuganj. It produces chemical fertilizer for the country. There are more than 500 rice mills, which means above 40% of the national rice output.

Ashuganj is known also as a commercial hub, with a big river port. There is a Transit Line in Ashugonj which communicates with India. It is also very well known as a layover destination for coach bus routes from Dhaka to Sylhet, and vice versa with hotels such as Hotel Ujan Vati and Hotel Razmoni.

The area has experienced severe power shortages but a revamping project is being planned and implemented under Japanese Debt Relief Grant Aid.

== See also ==
- Meghna Heli Bridge
