= Shahbazpur, Brahmanbaria =

Shahbazpur
- Village
- Location in Bangladesh
- Coordinates: 24°3′11″N 91°10′19″E
- Country: Bangladesh
- Division: Chittagong Division
- District: Brahmanbaria District
- Upazila: Sarail Upazila

Area
  - Total: 12.6 km^{2} (4.9 sq mi)

Population (2022 census)
  - Total: 23,823
  - Density: 1,890/km^{2} (4,900/sq mi)
- Time zone: UTC+6 (BST)

Shahbazpur is a village in Shahbazpur Union, Sarail Upazila, Brahmanbaria District in the Chittagong Division of eastern Bangladesh.

== Geography ==
Shahbazpur is located at 24.0530°N 91.1719°E.

== Demographics ==
According to the 2022 Bangladesh census, Shahbazpur had 4,885 households and a population of 23,823.

== Transport ==
The Dhaka–Sylhet segment of national highway N2 crosses the Titas River at Shahbazpur.
