= Ashuganj Upazila =

Ashuganj আশুগঞ্জ
- Upazila
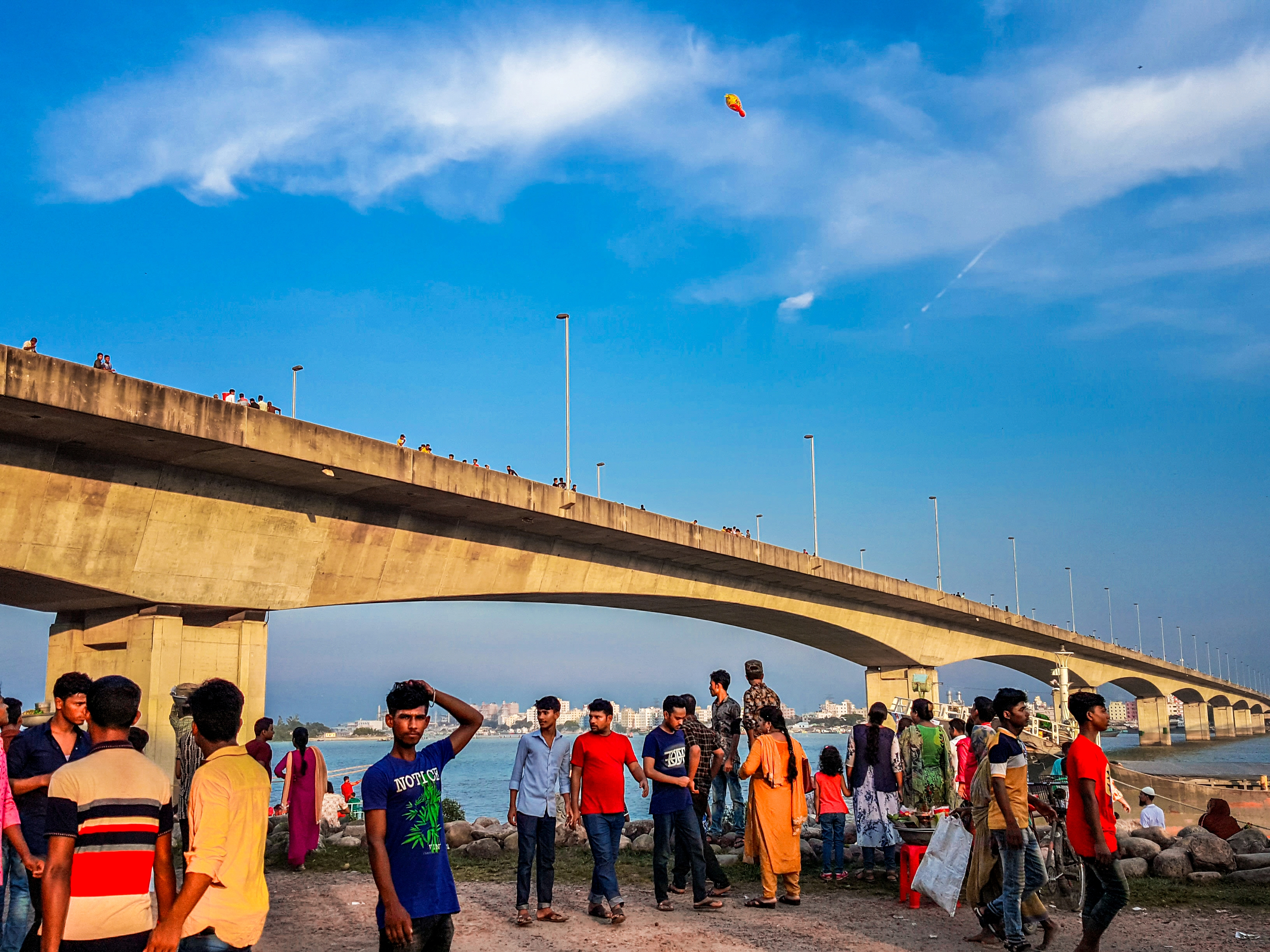
- View of Syed Nazrul Islam Bridge

- Coordinates: 24.0291°N 91.0048°E
- Country: Bangladesh
- Division: Chittagong
- District: Brahmanbaria
- Headquarters: Ashuganj

Area
  - Total: 67.59 km^{2} (26.10 sq mi)

Population (2022)
  - Total: 210,356
  - Density: 2,673/km^{2} (6,920/sq mi)
- Time zone: UTC+6 (BST)
- Postal code: 3402
- Area code: 08528

Ashuganj Upazila mauza geocode map

Ashuganj (Bengali: আশুগঞ্জ) is an upazila of Brahmanbaria District in the Division of Chittagong, Bangladesh. The area is home to the Port of Ashuganj.

== Demographics ==
Religions in Ashuganj Upazila (2022)
Religion	Percent
Islam	95.73%
Hinduism	4.18%
Other or not stated	0.09%

According to the 2022 Bangladeshi census, Ashuganj Upazila had 43,551 households and a population of 210,356. 11.91% of the population were under 5 years of age. Ashuganj had a literacy rate (age 7 and over) of 74.06%: 73.89% for males and 74.21% for females, and a sex ratio of 93.23 males for every 100 females. 39,613 (18.83%) lived in urban areas.

According to the 2011 Census of Bangladesh, Ashuganj Upazila had 33,552 households and a population of 180,654. 54,449 (30.14%) were under 10 years of age. Ashuganj had a literacy rate (age 7 and over) of 51.20%, compared to the national average of 51.8%, and a sex ratio of 1045 females per 1000 males. 36,749 (20.34%) lived in urban areas.

== Economy ==
In Ashugonj, there are more than 500 rice mills which means above 40% rice supply from Ashugonj. Ashugonj Fertilizer is a biggest chemical fertilizer company. There is a Transit in Ashugonj which communicate with India. Ashugonj City is also known as river port. There is also a gas transmission company.

The area has experienced severe power shortages but a revamped project is being planned and implemented under Japanese Debt Relief Grant Aid.

=== Power plant ===
Ashuganj Upazila is known for its power plant which generates much of the electricity for the country especially for the capital city. Ashuganj Fertilizer Ltd is on the other side of Ashuganj. It produces chemical fertilizer for the country. It is especially known as commercial area. Almost 2.5% electricity supply from Ashugonj Power Station.

== Administration ==
Ashuganj Upazila is divided into eight union parishads: Araishidha, Ashuganj, Char Chartala, Durgapur, Lalpur, Paschim Talshahar, Sarifpur, and Tarua. The union parishads are subdivided into 30 mauzas and 41 villages.

== Notable people ==
- Abdul Quadir, poet, essayist and journalist
- Faridul Huda, politician
- Mustafa Jabbar, minister of posts and telecommunications (2018-2023), was born in Char Chartala in 1949.

== See also ==
- Meghna Heli Bridge
