= Bariura Old Bridge =

Bariura Old Bridge বাড়িউড়া প্রাচীন পুল
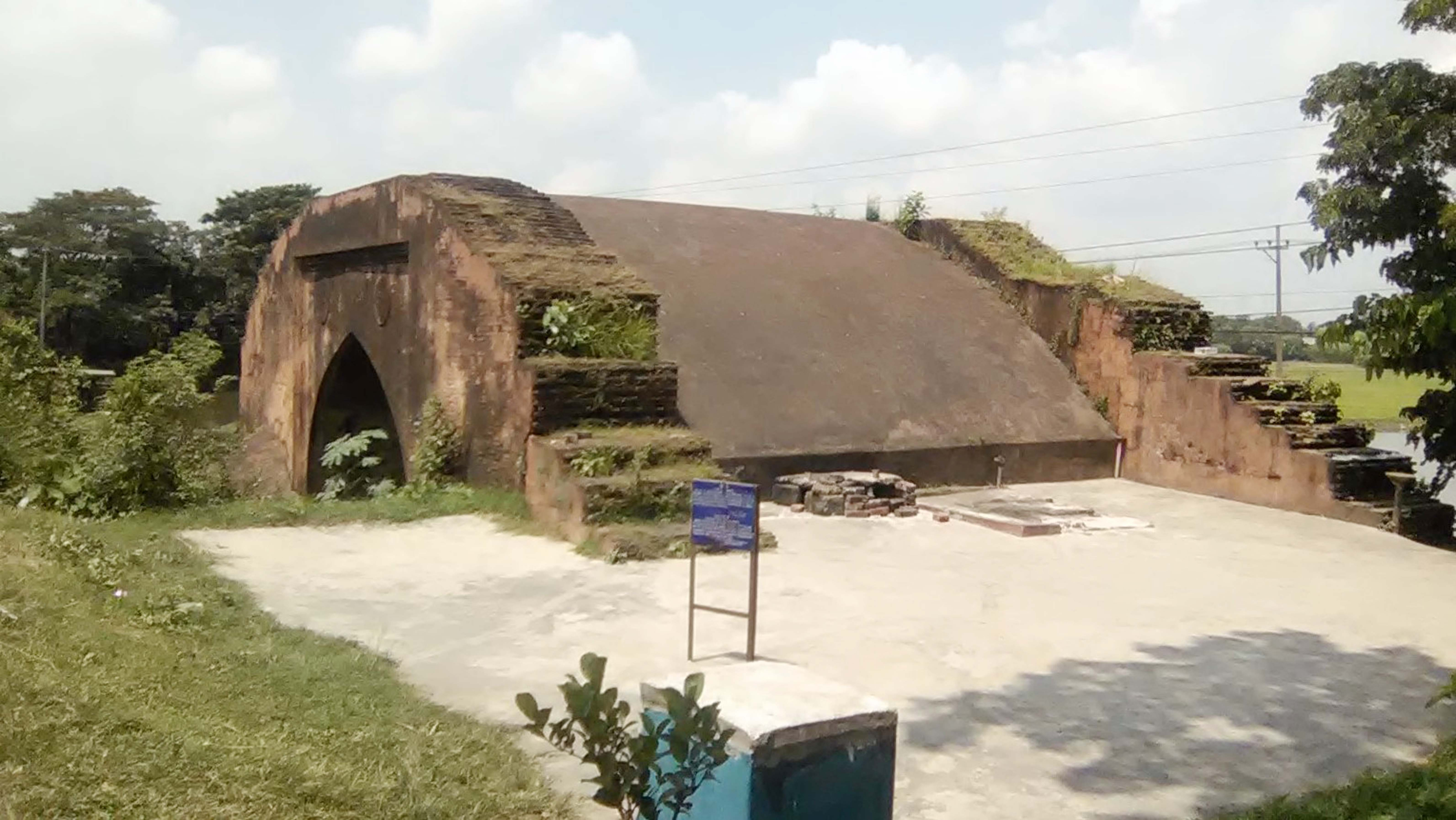
- Mughal Bridge
- Coordinates: 24.05424°N 91.1505998°E
- Locale: Bariura, Sarail Upazila, Brahmanbaria District, Bangladesh
- Official name: Bariura Old Bridge
- Other name(s): Hatirpool (Bengali: হাতিরপুল, lit. 'Elephant's Bridge')

Bariura Old Bridge (Bengali: বাড়িউড়া প্রাচীন পুল) or Hatirpool (Bengali: হাতিরপুল) is one of the ancient bridges in Sarail Upazila of Brahmanbaria District, and is located 15 kilometres (9.3 mi) north of Brahmanbaria.

It was built during Mughal Empire at Bariura, adjacent to the Dhaka-Sylhet highway.

== Construction ==
It was a brick, lime and concrete-based old bridge built in the 16th century to connect Sarail and Shahbajpur areas.

== History ==
The Bariura Bridge was built by Dewan Shahbaz Khan during his time in office in 1650. The bridge was built over the canal mainly for elephants to pass and it was therefore known as "Elephant's Bridge". The Dewans used to travel by the elephant along this road and also took rest near this bridge.

The bridge was deserted for a long time and covered by brush. Today, the canal flow has been changed by Bangladesh Road Transport Corporation (BRTC) in the south to save the bridge by founding a modern bridge near the spot.

The old Bridge is now under care of the Bangladesh Department of Archaeology.

== Gallery ==
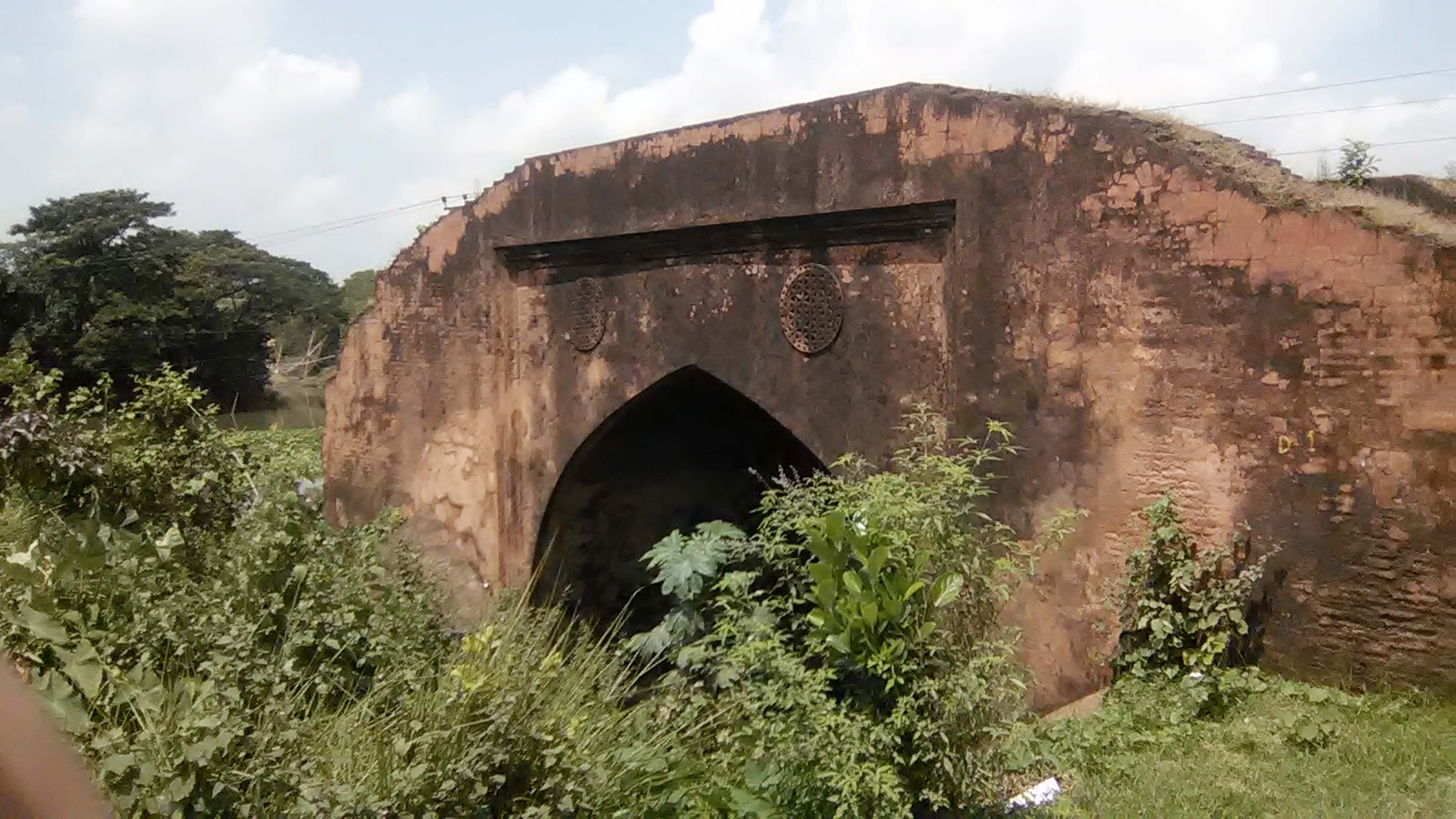

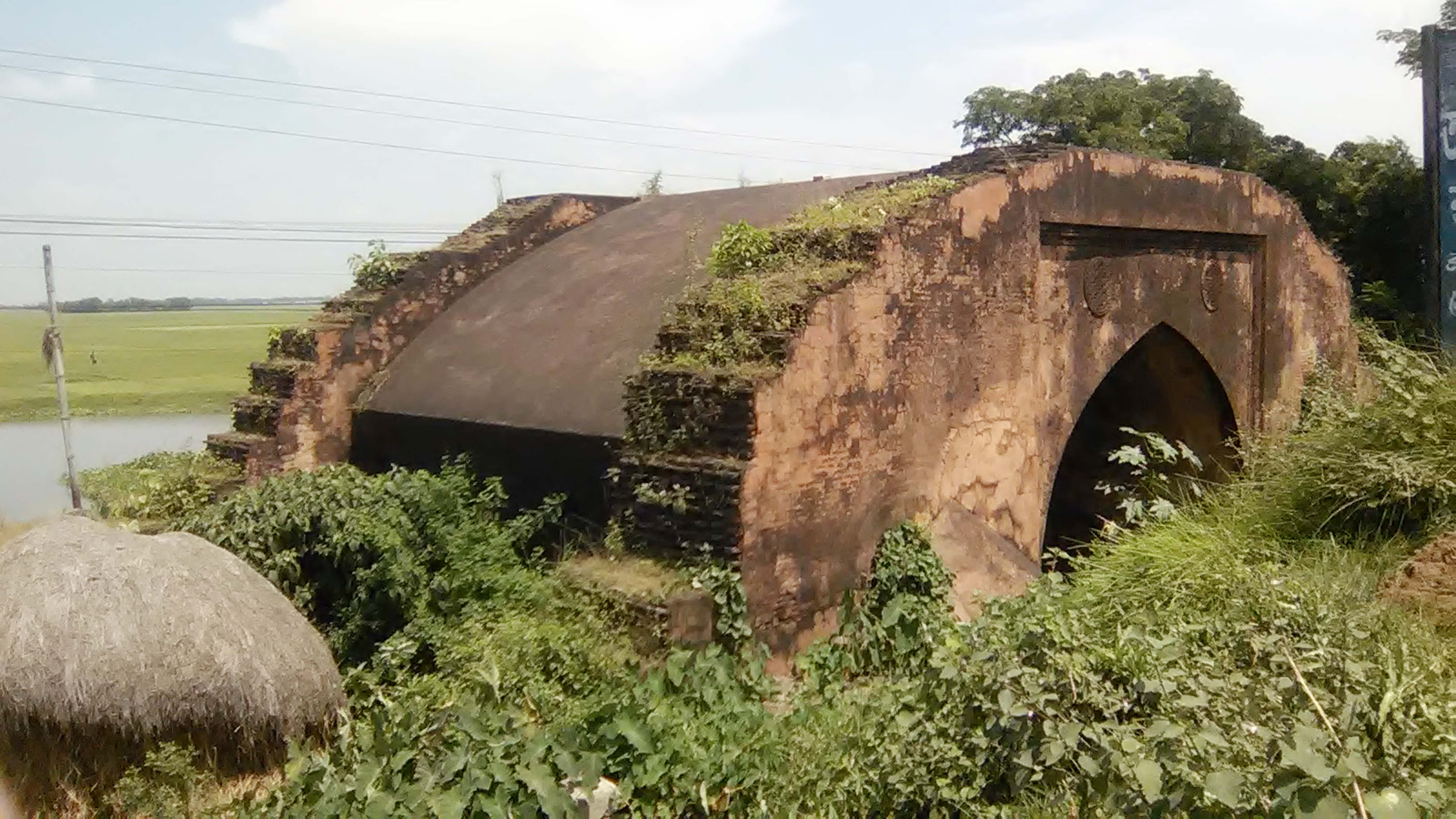

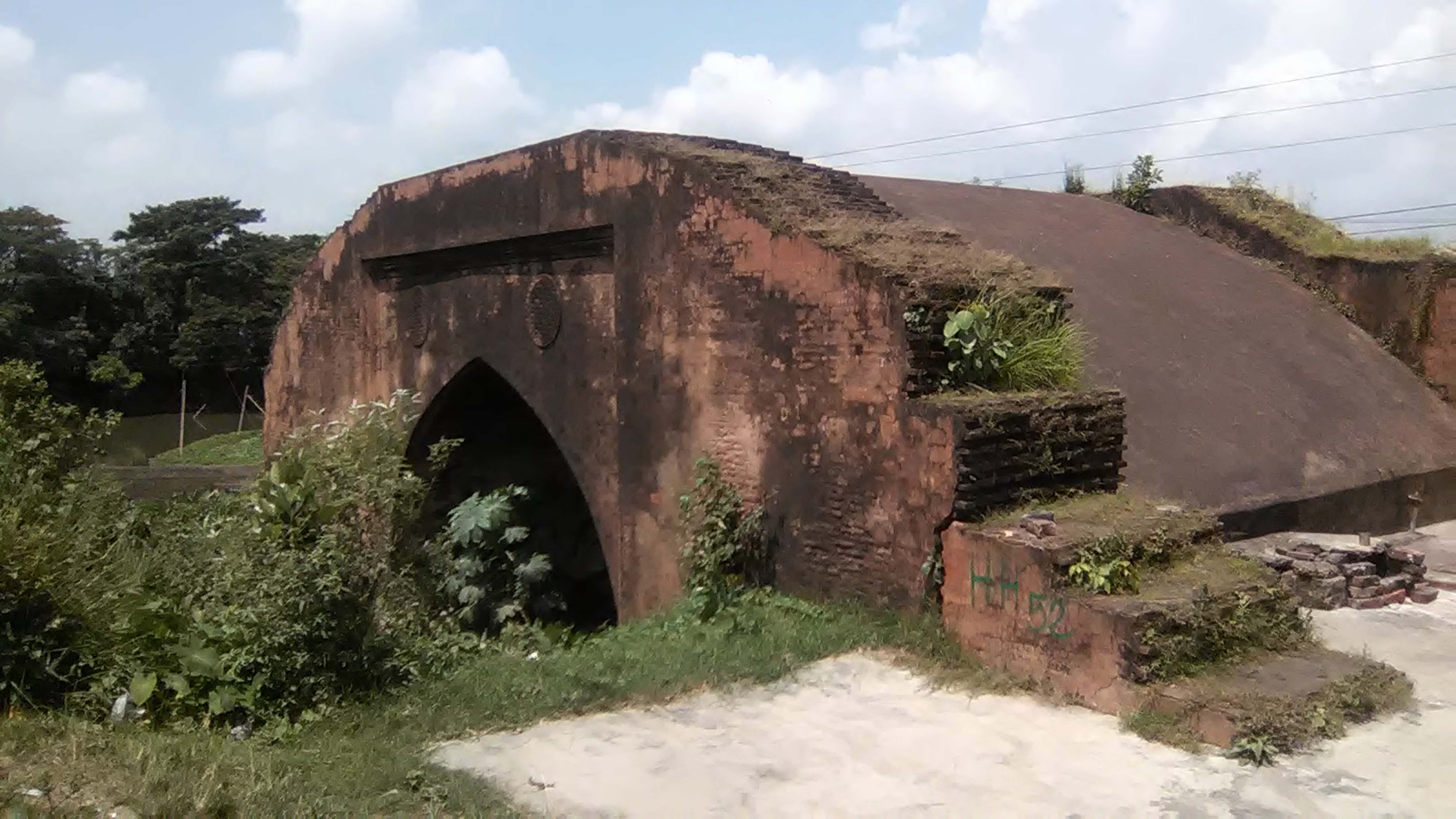

== See also ==
- List of archaeological sites in Bangladesh
