= Shahbazpur Union, Sarail =

Shahbazpur
- Location in Bangladesh
- Coordinates: 24°3.1′N 91°10.4′E
- Country: Bangladesh
- Division: Chittagong Division
- District: Brahmanbaria District
- Upazila: Sarail Upazila

Area
  - Total: 23.2 km^{2} (9.0 sq mi)

Population (2022)
  - Total: 32,772
  - Density: 1,410/km^{2} (3,660/sq mi)
- Time zone: UTC+6 (Bangladesh Time)
- Postal code: 3431

Shahbazpur (Bengali: শাহবাজপুর) is a union parishad under Sarail Upazila of Brahmanbaria District in the Chittagong Division of eastern Bangladesh.

== Geography ==
Shahbazpur Union has a total area of 5,724 acres (2,316 ha).

== Demographics ==
According to the 2011 Bangladesh census, Shahbazpur Union had 5,606 households and a population of 29,757. The literacy rate (age 7 and over) was 47.1%, compared to the national average of 51.8%. 53.8% of the employed population was engaged in agricultural work.

== Administration ==
Shahbazpur Union is divided into 4 mauzas: Bara Dhitpur, Jadabpur, Noagoan, and Sahbazpur.

== Transport ==
Shahbazpur Union is on the N2 national highway connecting Dhaka and Sylhet.

== Education ==
According to Banglapedia, Shahbazpur Multilateral High School, founded in 1907, is a notable secondary school.

== Notable people ==
- Nurul Amin, Former Prime Minister of Pakistan during Bangladesh Liberation War.
