= Arifil Mosque =

Mosque in Brahmanbaria, Bangladesh

- আড়িফাইল মসজিদ
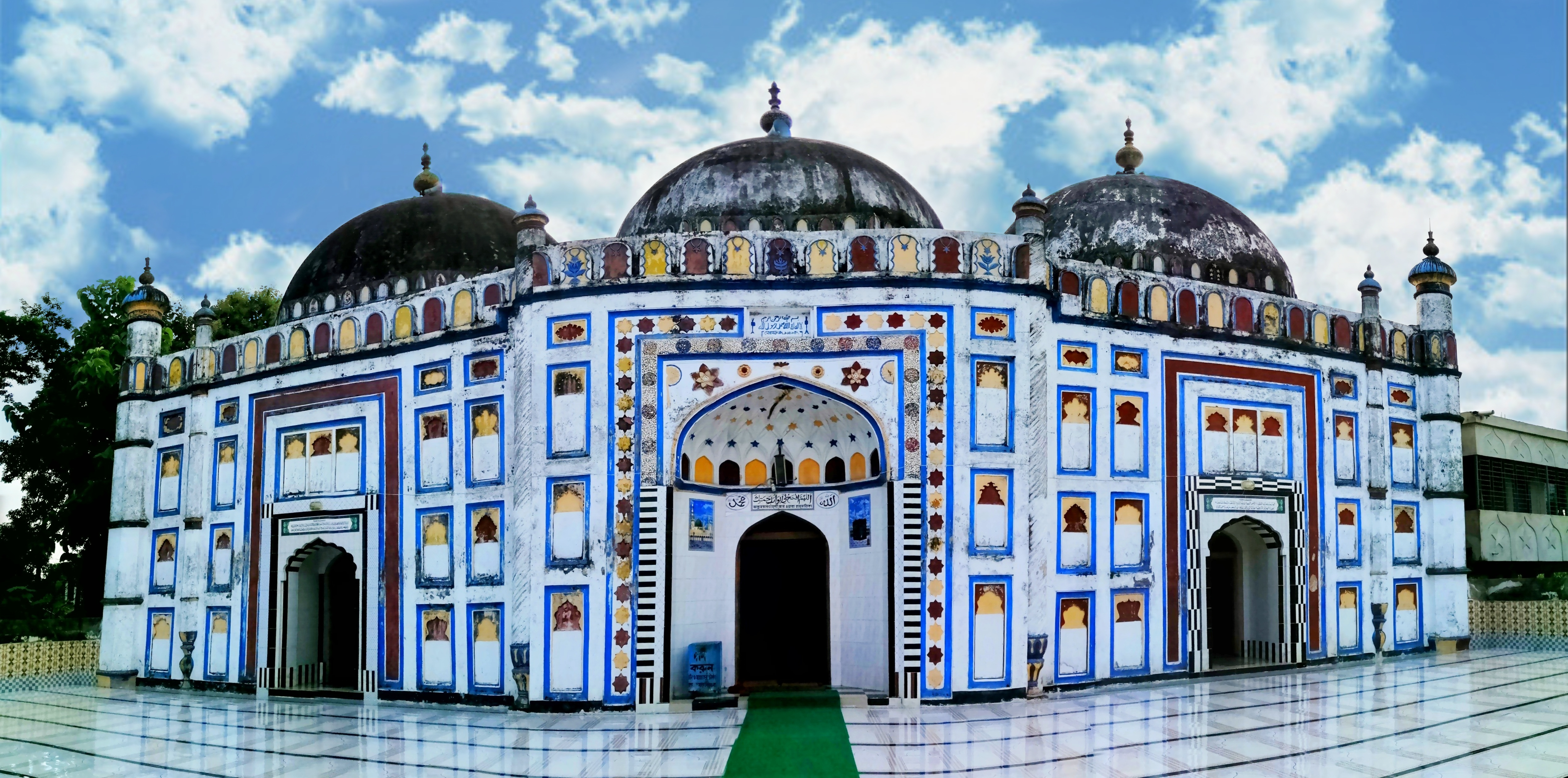

- Location of the mosque in Bangladesh

Religion
- Affiliation: Islam
- Ecclesiastical or organizational status: Mosque
- Status: Active

Location
- Location: Sarail Upazila, Brahmanbaria District
- Country: Bangladesh
- Interactive map of Arifil Mosque
- Administration: Department of Archaeology
- Coordinates: 24°04′12″N 91°06′27″E

Architecture
- Type: Mosque architecture
- Style: Mughal
- Founder: Shah Arif
- Completed: 1662; 364 years ago

Specifications
- Length: 24.38 m (80.0 ft)
- Width: 9.3 m (31 ft)
- Height (max): 8 m (26 ft)
- Dome: Three
- Materials: Brick; concrete

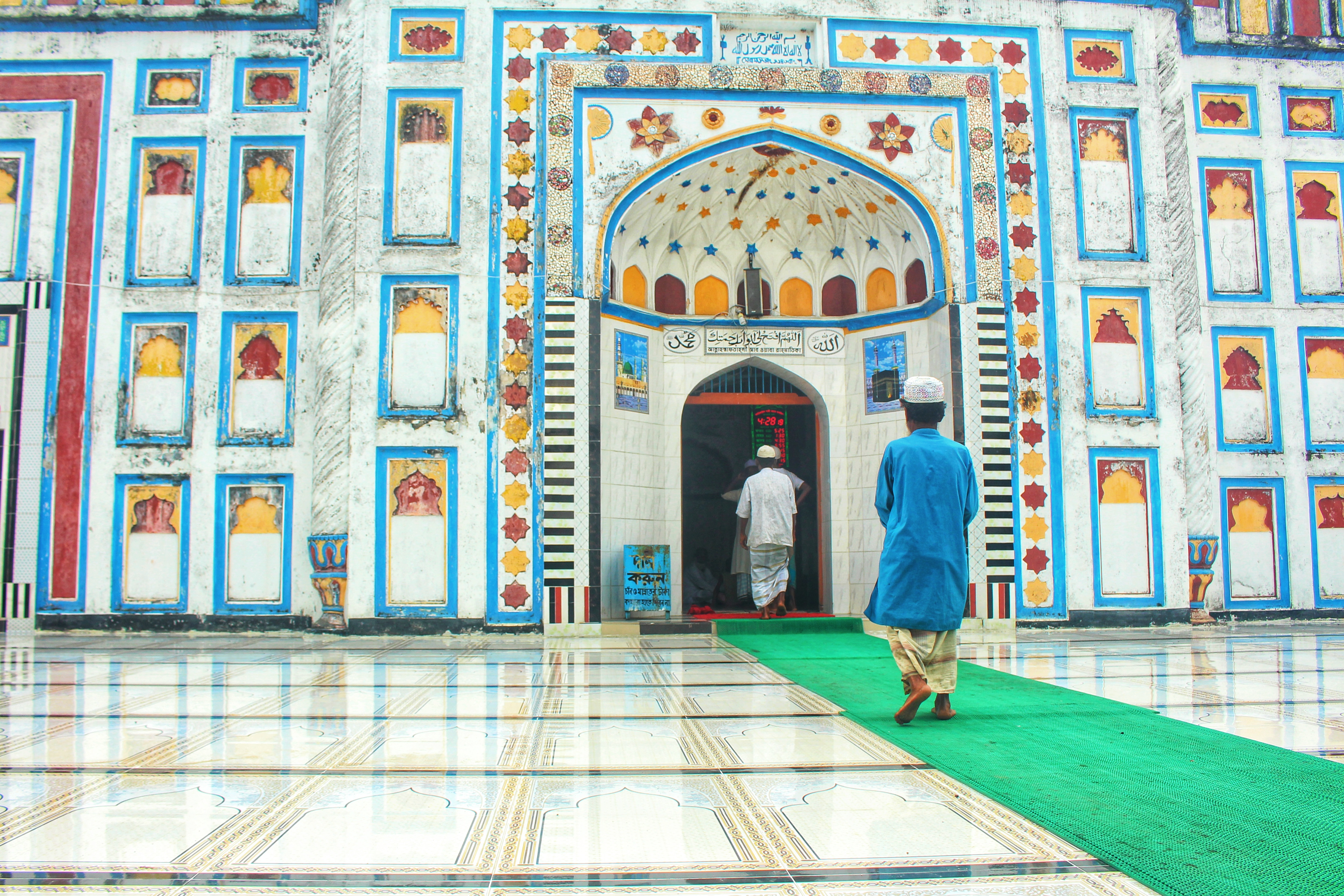
Main gate of the mosque

The Arifil Mosque (Bengali: আড়িফাইল মসজিদ, Arabic: مسجد عارفايل) is located in Sarail Upazila, in the Brahmanbaria District of Bangladesh. Founded in the late 17th century, the name of the mosque was derived from Shah Arif, a saint.

Arifil Mosque is located 15 kilometres (9.3 mi) from Brahmanbaria District and 0.5 kilometres (0.31 mi) northwest from Sarail Upazila.

== Architecture ==
The rectangular mosque prayer hall floor is 24.38 by 9.3 metres (80.0 by 30.5 ft), and is approximately 8 metres (26 ft) high. Each wall is 1.6 metres (5 ft 3 in) wide, bearing the weight of the roof. The courtyard at the front of the mosque boundary has a modern gate, that faces towards the east. Four octagonal pillars strengthen the corners of the mosque and pass through the horizontal parapets those are topped with kalasa finials. Two big domes on the roof sit aside the middle main dome, based on the rectangular supporting structure inside the mosque like half domed vim. Out of five exits three in the east and each one in the north and south side, middle main door is bigger. All mihrabs are similar in size except depth of the middle of the west side. Ancient echo system applied here by smooth polishing of floor, walls, Mahrabs and domes inside to reflect addresses each corner equally.

The Arifil Mosque stands on the south-east of Sagardighi, a large water resort. It was discovered and repaired between 2009 and 2010.

The mosque is designed by friezes of blind merlons spiral scroll on the frames of mihrabs and rectangular frames. Middle, north and south doors are deep arched alcove. Half domed vim and middle mihrab ornamented with muqarnas works in stucco.

This mosque is managed by the Bangladeshi Department of Archaeology.

== See also ==
- Islam in Bangladesh
- List of mosques in Bangladesh
