= Naioree =

2001 film

Naioree (নাইওরী)
- Directed by: Toukir Ahmed
- Written by: Shakoor Majid
- Starring: Toukir Ahmed; Bipasha Hayat
- Cinematography: Rafiqul Bari Chowdhury
- Edited by: Toukir Ahmed
- Music by: Jasimuddin; Radha Ramana; Hosne Ara Jolly
- Distributed by: Protune Entertainment
- Release date: 23 July 2001
- Running time: 95 minutes
- Country: Bangladesh
- Languages: Bengali; English

Naioree (Bengali: নাইওরী, also Naiory, Nā'i'ōrī, new bride who went to her father's home from the bridegroom's home first time after marriage) is a 2001 Bangladeshi telefilm written by Shakoor Majid, directed by Toukir Ahmed and produced by Protune Entertainment.

== Plot ==
The old love story is in a village named Birampur. Some piper plays the flute under the banyan tree. He has no parents. A village leader brings him to his house. His daughter falls in love with him. The villagers come to know this matter and blames his family. He tells the piper to leave his house but he loses his leadership. His daughter is sent to her aunt's house and gets married as a second wife. She shares her love story with her husband. Her husband got married only for a child. When his first wife became expectant then he accepted this matter. Once her mother-in-law asked if she wanted to go back to her father's home, she sent a letter through a beggar to his brother. Her brother came to meet her. He told her that for prestige issues, her parents told to the villagers that their daughter died. Then she refused to go to her parental home. Last she met her lover who become a rural singer.

== Cast ==
- Toukir Ahmed as Ali Ahmed
- Bipasha Hayat as Pearee
- Azizul Hakim as Mana
- Rawshan Ara as mother
- Dilara Zaman as mother-in-law
- Parvin Kana as Ali Ahmed's first wife
- Sumiya Rahman Shimul as Sheuli
- Shovashish Dev Titu as Tanu
- Nazim Uddin Lashkar as Imam
- Bhobotosh Barman as match maker
- Ataur Rahman as Qazi
- Kamrol Ahbab Tipu as beggar
- Anwar Khan
- Nurul Alam
- Ahmed Zahid
- Sweet
- Hannan Sirker
- Nekbar Fakir
- Biplob
- Eti
- Lucky
- Manir Ahmed
- Phool Mia

== Soundtrack ==
The film is scored by Jasim Uddin, Radha Ramana, Hosne Ara Jolly and several artists have rendered the songs.

No.	Title	Artist	Length
1.	"Prano Shoikhire"	Bipasha Hayat
2.	"Bhoromor Koyo Giya"	Bipasha Hayat
3.	"Kare Dekhabo"	Selim Chowdhury
4.	"Hunen Hunen"	Selim Chowdhury
5.	"Shorol Mone Prem Koria"	Khaleque Dewan
