= Sheuly Azad =

Bangladesh politician

Umme Fatema Nazma Begum
- উম্মে ফাতেমা নাজমা বেগম

Member of the Bangladesh Parliament for Reserved women seats-12
- In office 20 February 2019 – 6 August 2024

Personal details
- Born: 2 October 1972 (age 53)
- Party: Bangladesh Awami League
- Spouse: A K M Iqbal Azad
- Education: SSC
- Nickname: Sheuly Azad

Umme Fatema Nazma Begum (Bengali: উম্মে ফাতেমা নাজমা বেগম; born 2 October 1972), better known as Sheuly Azad, is an entrepreneur and politician, holding one of the seats reserved for women in the 11th Jatiya Sangsad, the Bangladeshi parliament.

== Career ==
After the death of her husband, Azad entered politics. The Sarail Upazila Awami League committee was dissolved and Sheuly Azad was elected joint convener-1 of the upazila unit on 10 December 2014. She later was appointed general secretary of the unit.

Azad was appointed reserved seat member of parliament in 2019. She was the first Awami League member of parliament from Sarail Upazila since 1973.

Azad campaigned for Abdus Sattar Bhuiyan, expelled Bangladesh Nationalist Party politician, for by-polls in 2023.

After the fall of the Sheikh Hasina led Awami League government a murder case was filed against Azad regarding the death of Liton Miah, activist of Hefazat-e-Islam Bangladesh, who was killed on 28 March 2021 in a clash with the police. Detective Branch arrested her in the case from Niketan and handed her over to Sarail Police Station.

== Personal life ==
Azad was married to AKM Iqbal Azad, senior vice-president of Sarail Upazila unit of Awami League. In 2012, her husband was killed by his rivals in the Awami League. Four people were sentenced to death in the murder case in July 2024.
