= Port of Ashuganj =

River port in Bangladesh

- Click on the map for a fullscreen view

Location
- Country: Bangladesh
- Location: Ashuganj Upazila, Brahmanbaria District
- Coordinates: 24°02′00″N 91°01′00″E
- UN/LOCODE: BGASJ

Details
- Owned by: Bangladesh Inland Water Transport Authority
- Type of harbour: River port Port of call

Ashuganj port is located in the district of Brahmanbaria in eastern Bangladesh, near the border with Northeast India

The Port of Ashuganj is a notable river port in eastern Bangladesh. It is one of the important industrial ports of the Bengal delta. It is located on the Meghna River. The port is a regional transshipment center in Eastern South Asia.

== Location ==
The port is located 28 km from Brahmanbaria town and 43 km from the Akhaura land border between Bangladesh and India.

== Facilities ==
The port is located in an industrial area in the vicinity of the Ashuganj Power Station, a 1777 megawatt thermal power plant which is one of the largest in Bangladesh. The port is also the terminal for a large fertilizer and chemical plant; as well as smaller power plants. The port hosts several warehouses and shipyards. Its industrial units receive gas supplies from the nearby Titas Gas field.

== Container terminal ==
A container terminal is under-construction in Ashuganj, but as of July 2017, the project has been delayed due to land disputes.

== Transshipment ==
Ashuganj port acts as a port of call for cargo shipments to the nearby Indian state of Tripura. Cargo unloaded in Ashuganj port is transported by road to the Akhaura-Agartala land border; and vice versa. The transshipment route allows access for several Indian states, including Mizoram, Manipur, Nagaland and Lower Assam.

== See also ==
- Port of Chittagong
