= Sarail Upazila =

Sarail সরাইল
- Upazila
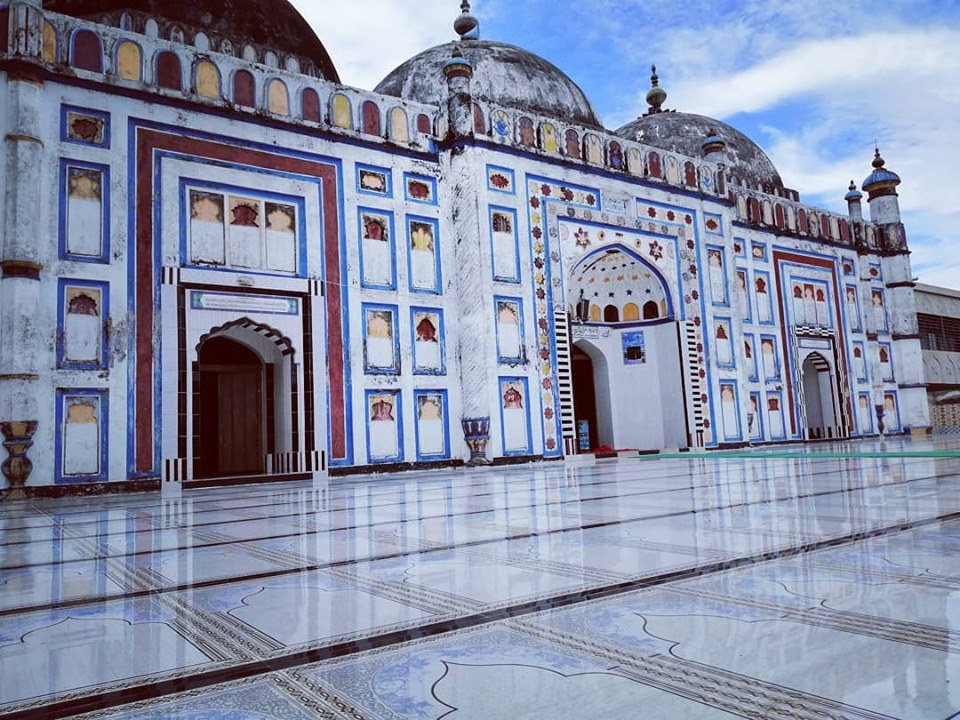
- Arifil Mosque

- Coordinates: 24°7.1′N 91°7.5′E
- Country: Bangladesh
- Division: Chittagong
- District: Brahmanbaria

Area
  - Total: 239.52 km^{2} (92.48 sq mi)

Population (2022)
  - Total: 364,369
  - Density: 1,521.2/km^{2} (3,940.0/sq mi)
- Time zone: UTC+6 (BST)
- Postal code: 3430
- Area code: 08527
- Website: Official Website of Sarail

Sarail Upazila mauza geocode map

Sarail (Bengali: সরাইল, romanized: Shorail) is an upazila of Brahmanbaria District located in the Chittagong Division and near the Dhaka Division, Bangladesh.

== History ==
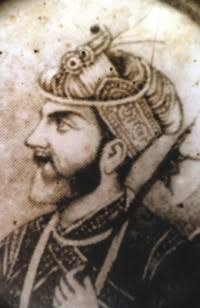
Isa Khan, leader of Bengal's 16th-century Baro-Bhuiyan rebel chieftains, had his capital situated in Sarail.

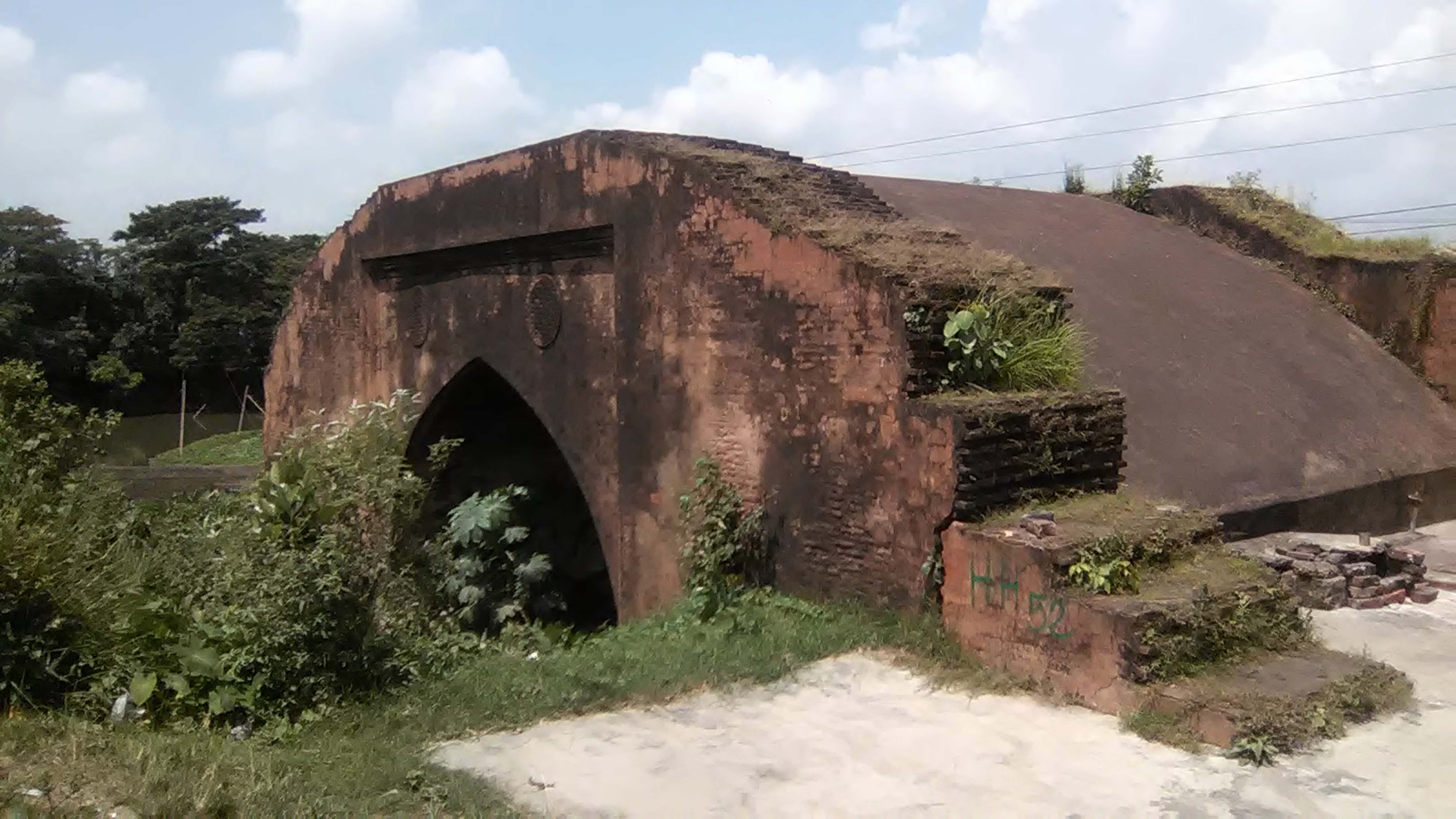
The Hatirpul, a medieval elephant pass built in Bariura.

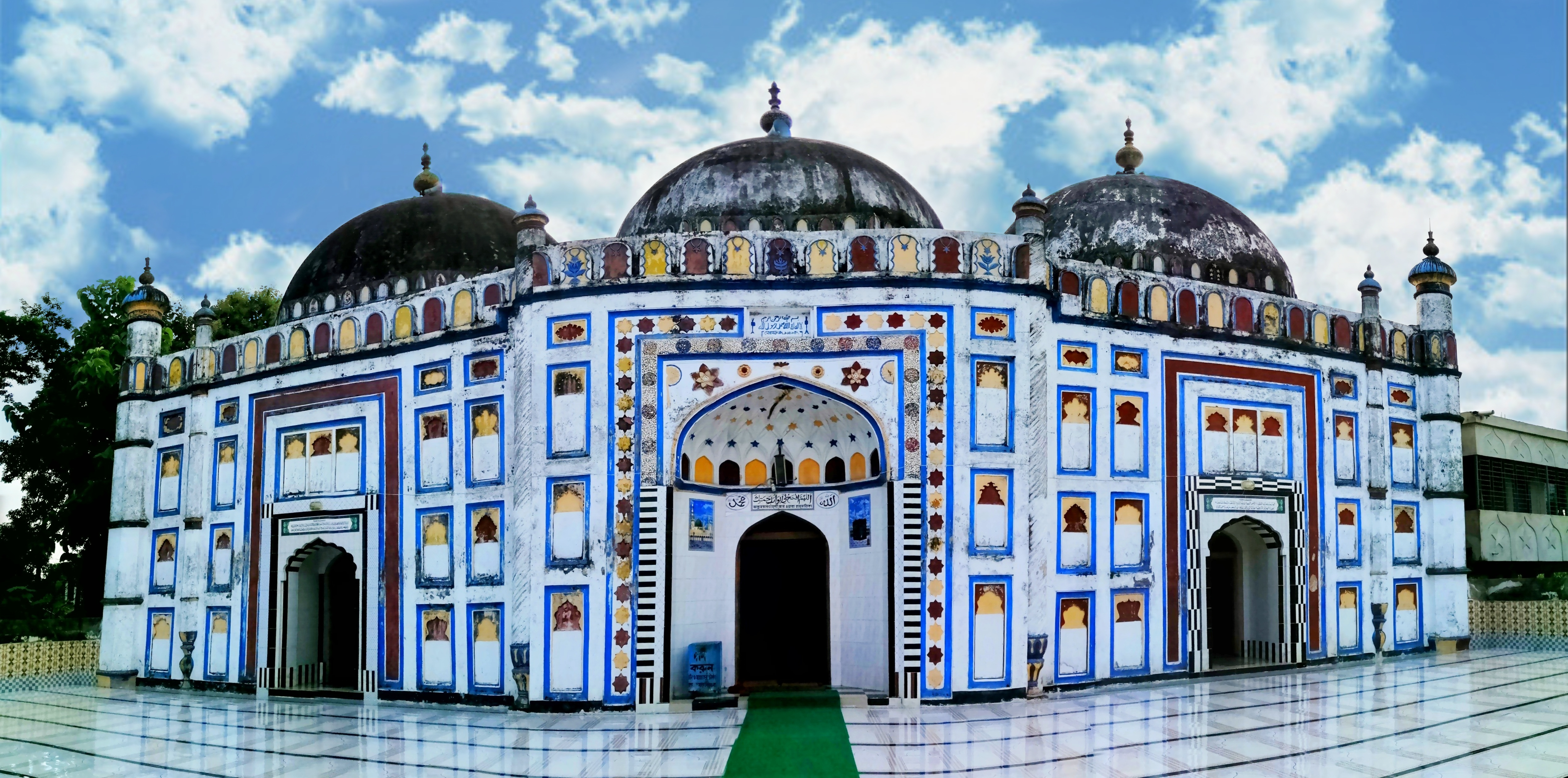
The Arifil Mosque in Sarail.

The leader of the Baro-Bhuiyan zamindars, Isa Khan, had his first and temporary capital situated in Sarail. During the Mughal era, Sarail was a mahallah (district) of the Sylhet Sarkar.

During the dewani of Dewan Shahbaz Khan in 1650, the Hatirpul was constructed. It was a bridge built over the canal mainly for elephant pass. The Mughal dewans used to communicate by the elephant in this road and also took rest near this bridge. In 1662, the Arifil Mosque was constructed by Shah Arif. There are unknown tombs located near the mosque, supposedly belonging to the wives of Isa Khan.

During the Bangladesh Liberation War of 1971, the Pakistani Army killed about 70 innocent people in the Bitghar area. On 5 May, the freedom fighters raided the Pakistani Army's camp in the Shahbazpur area and killed 9 Pakistani soldiers; one freedom fighter was killed during this raid. A number of Pakistani Army officers and the chairman of the Sarail Peace Committee were also killed. The freedom fighters set up a mine bomb north of Kalikaccha Bazar. This exploded and destroyed two military vehicles. Three mass graves remain in Sarail. Memorial monuments were established in the upazila's Bitghar area, the Annada Government High School, the Sarail Degree College and also a monument dedicated to the martyr Sheikh Mesbahuddin Saraili.

In 1990, Sarail was made an upazila of Bangladesh.

== Geography ==
Sarail is located at 24.1183°N 91.125°E. It has a total area of 227.22 km^{2}.

== Demographics ==
Religions in Sarail Upazila (2022)
Religion	Percent
Islam	93.81%
Hinduism	6.18%
Other or not stated	0.01%

According to the 2022 Bangladeshi census, Sarail Upazila had 75,077 households and a population of 364,369. 12.93% of the population were under 5 years of age. Sarail had a literacy rate (age 7 and over) of 67.80%: 66.74% for males and 68.71% for females, and a sex ratio of 87.99 males for every 100 females. 72,776 (19.97%) lived in urban areas.

According to the 2011 Census of Bangladesh, Sarail Upazila had 58,622 households and a population of 315,208. 102,749 (32.60%) were under 10 years of age. Sarail had a literacy rate (age 7 and over) of 40.85%, compared to the national average of 51.8%, and a sex ratio of 1068 females per 1000 males. 46,927 (14.89%) lived in urban areas.

According to the 1991 Bangladesh census, Sarail had a population of 254,481. Males constituted 50.32% of the population, and females 49.68%. The population aged 18 or over was 120,249. Sarail had an average literacy rate of 22.6% (7+ years), against the national average of 32.4%.

== Administration ==
Sarail Upazila is divided into nine union parishads: Auraol, Chunta, Kalikachchha, Noagaon, Pakshimul, Panishor, Sarail, Shahbazpur, and Shahjadapur. The union parishads are subdivided into 67 mauzas and 141 villages.

Upazila Chairman: Md. Sher Alam Mia

== Notable residents ==
- Dewan Mahbub Ali, member of the East Bengal Legislative Assembly, lived in Sarail.
- Nurul Amin, prime minister of Pakistan (December 1970), was born in Shahbazpur in 1893.
- Sheuly Azad, member of parliament (2019-2024), lives in West Kuttapara.
- Abdus Sattar Bhuiyan, member of parliament, was born in Parmanandpur in 1939.
- Ullaskar Dutta, Indian revolutionary, was born in Kalikachha in 1885.
- Isa Khan, first chief of the Baro-Bhuiyan confederacy in Bengal, was the zamindar of Sarail.
- Habibur Rahman Milon, journalist, was born in Uchalia Para in 1935.
- Ahmed Rafiq, Bengali language movement activist, writer, and researcher, was born in Shahbazpur in 1929.
- Taheruddin Thakur, minister of state for information and broadcasting (1975), was from Sarail.

== See also ==
- Upazilas of Bangladesh
- Districts of Bangladesh
- Divisions of Bangladesh
