= Shakoor Majid =

Bangladeshi architect, photographer, writer and filmmaker (born 1965)

- শাকুর মজিদ
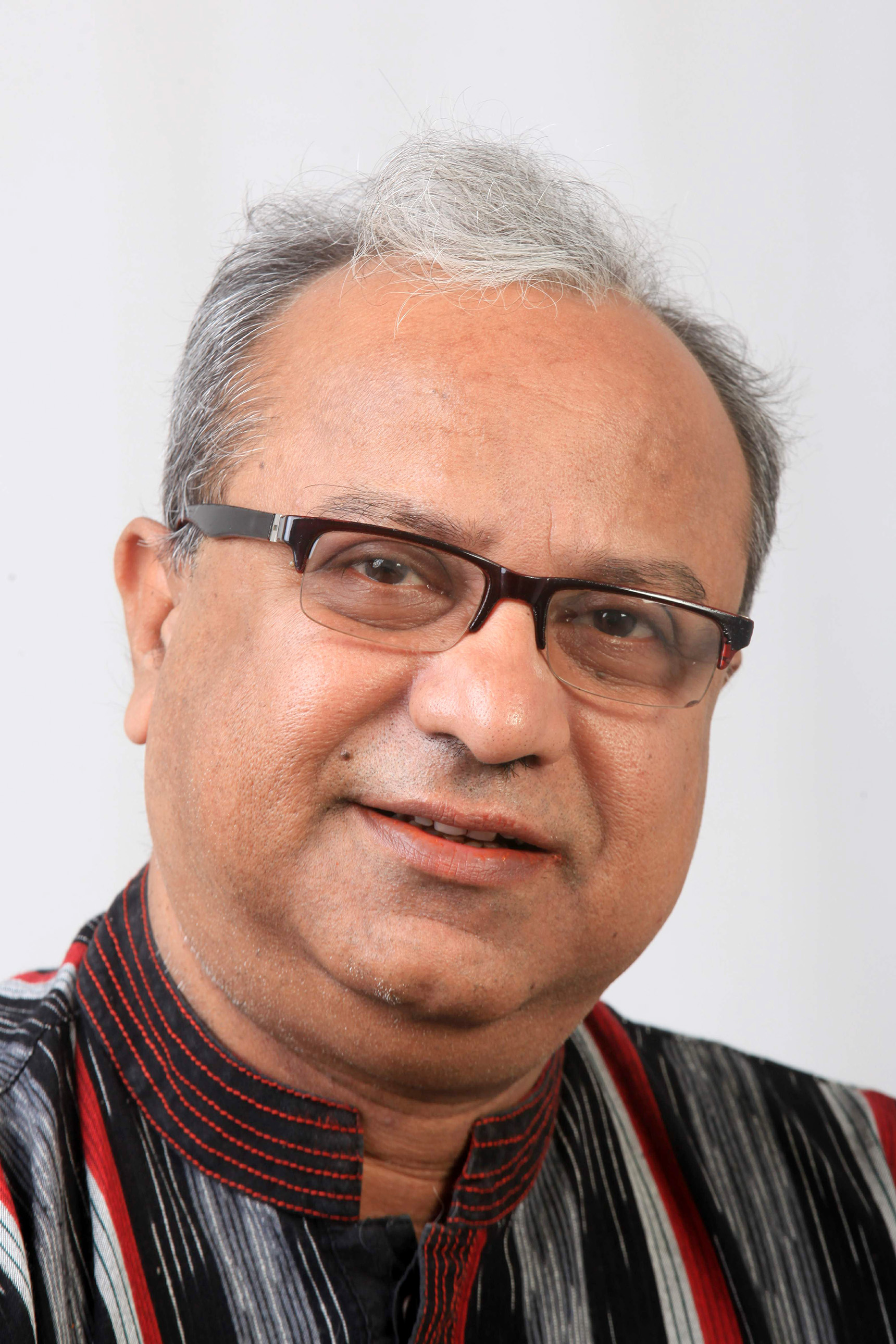
- Majid in 2016
- Born: 22 November 1965 (age 60); Sylhet District, East Pakistan, Pakistan
- Education: BSc in architecture
- Alma mater: Faujdarhat Cadet College; Bangladesh University of Engineering and Technology
- Website: shakoormajid.com

Shakoor Majid (born 22 November 1965) is a Bangladeshi architect, writer, film maker and photographer. He was awarded Bangla Academy Literary Award 2017 in the travelogue category by the Government of Bangladesh.

== Early life and education ==
Majid was born in Mathiura village at Biani Bazar, Sylhet on 22 November 1965 to Abdul Majid and Farida Khatun. He is the eldest of his five brothers and sisters.

Majid had his primary education from Mathiura Model Primary School, SSC (1982) and HSC (1984) from Faujdarhat Cadet College. He was in the merit list in his secondary exam. He graduated in architecture in 1993 from Bangladesh University of Engineering and Technology (BUET). During his student life he worked as journalist in different newspapers.

== Career ==
In 1993, Majid along with two other architects had formed a consulting firm, Triangle Consultants. He is also the managing director or CEO of other organizations. He has been serving as a part-time faculty of Ahsanullah University of Science and Technology since 2004.

== Personal life ==
Majid lives in Dhaka with his wife Hosne Ara Jolly and two sons.

== Selected works ==
=== Books ===
- 10 Sadar Street: Rabindranath's Kolkata – A travel book exploring places associated with Rabindranath Tagore in Kolkata.

=== Stage plays ===
- Mahajoner Nao – A stage play.
- Hason Janer Raja – A stage play based on the life of Hason Raja.

=== Documentary films ===
- Islamer Sthapatyadhara ("Architectural Heritage of Islam") – A 30-episode documentary series on Islamic architecture.
- Bhatibanglar Adhiraj: In Search of the Dispossession of Baul Poet Rashid Uddin – A documentary film on Baul poet Rashid Uddin and issues surrounding the appropriation of his songs.

== Awards ==
- 2016 – Received the IFIC Bank Literature Award for the travelogue Ferauner Gram ("The Pharaoh's Village").
- 2018 – Received the Bangla Academy Literary Award (2017) for contributions to travel literature and biographical writing.
