= Brahmanbaria District =

District of Bangladesh in Chattogram Division

Brahmanbaria District ব্রাহ্মণবাড়িয়া জেলা
- District of Bangladesh
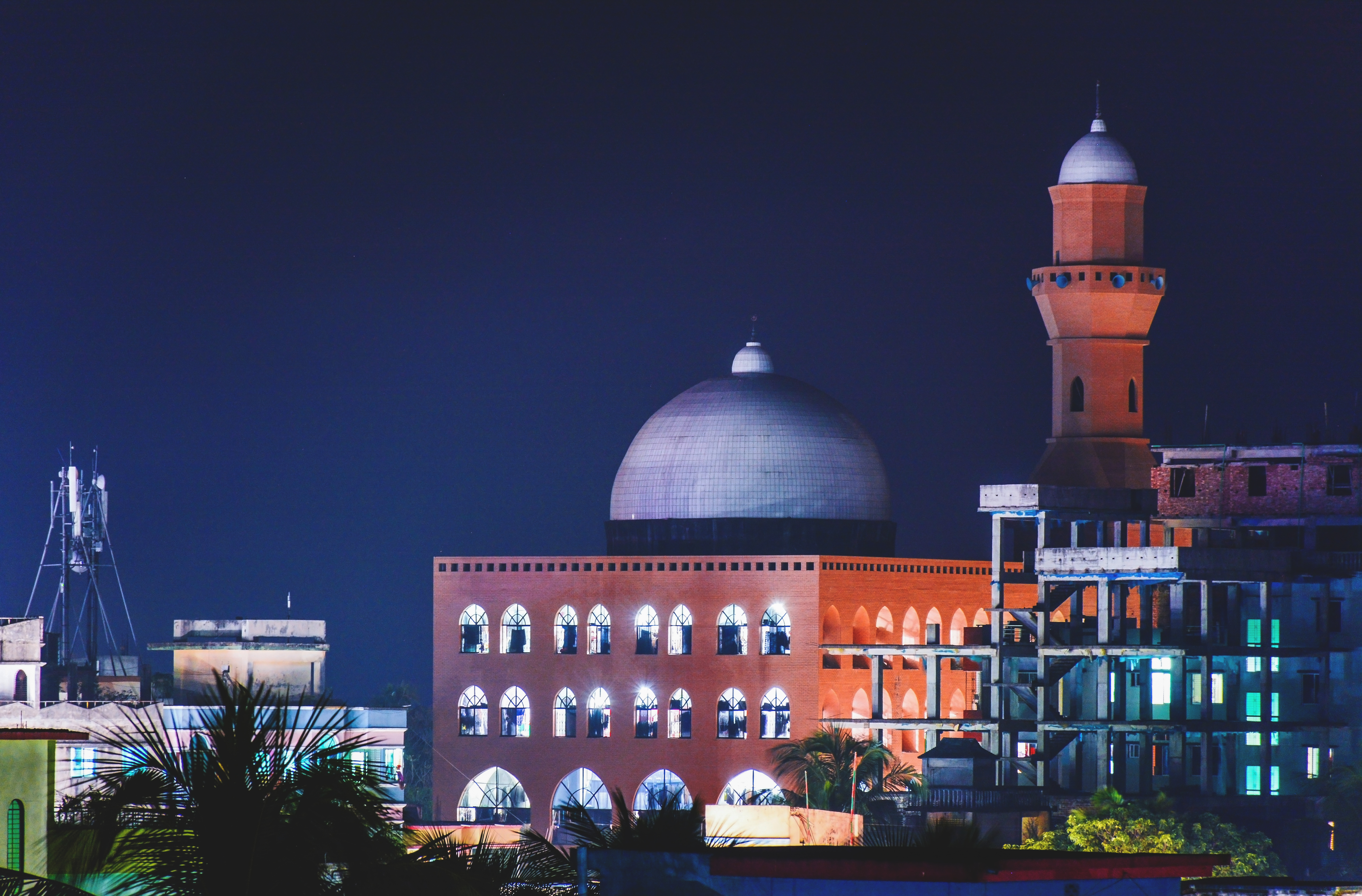
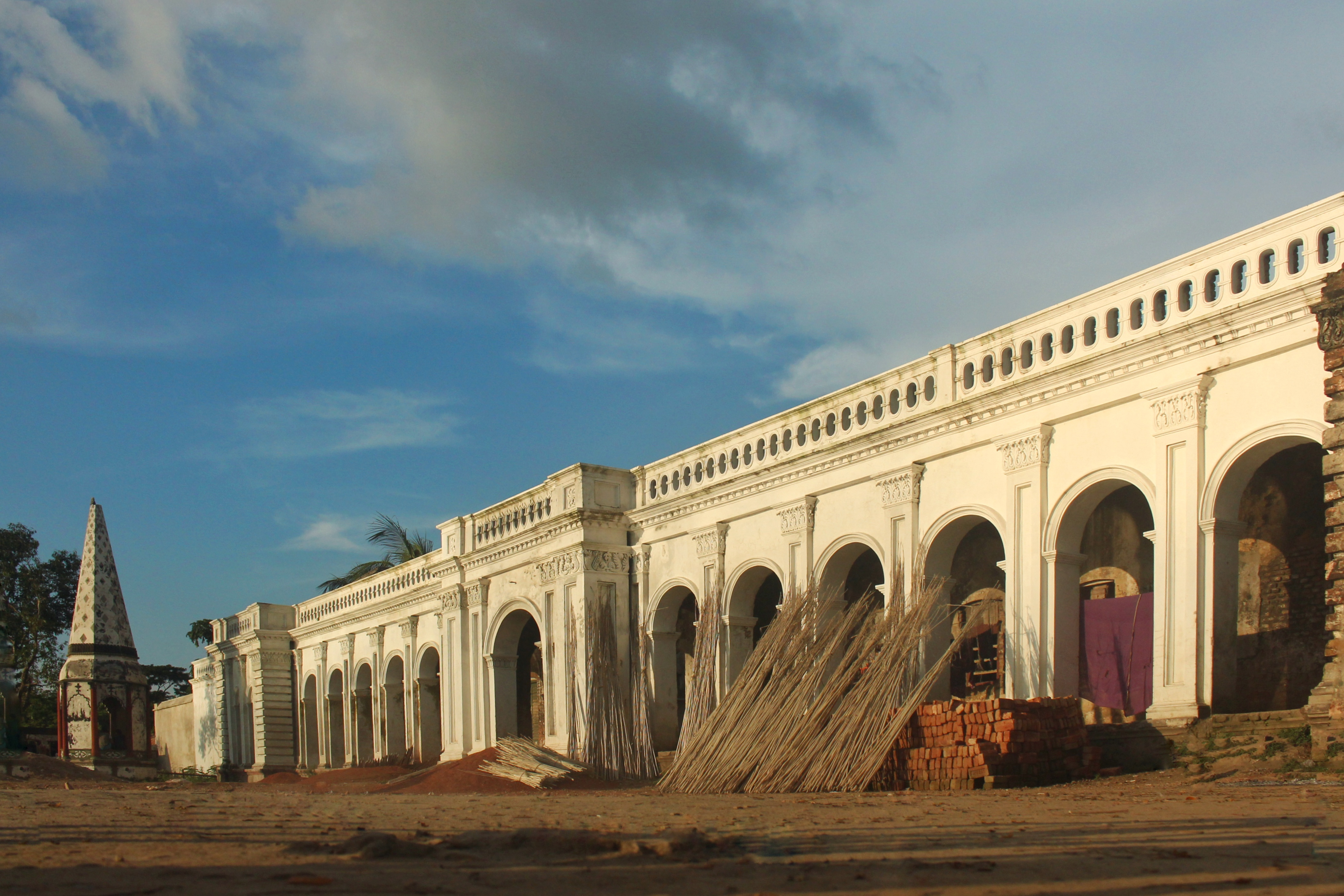
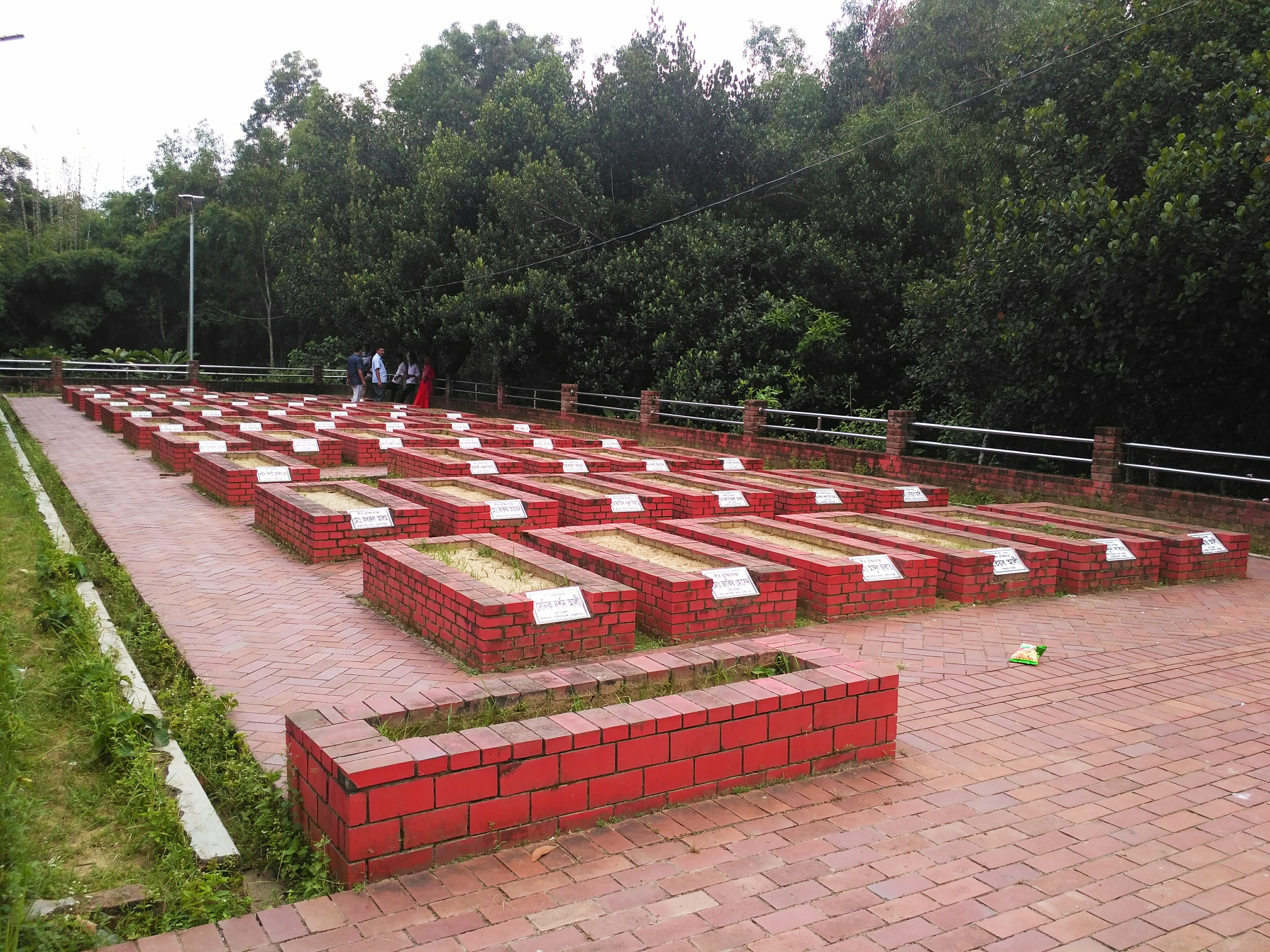
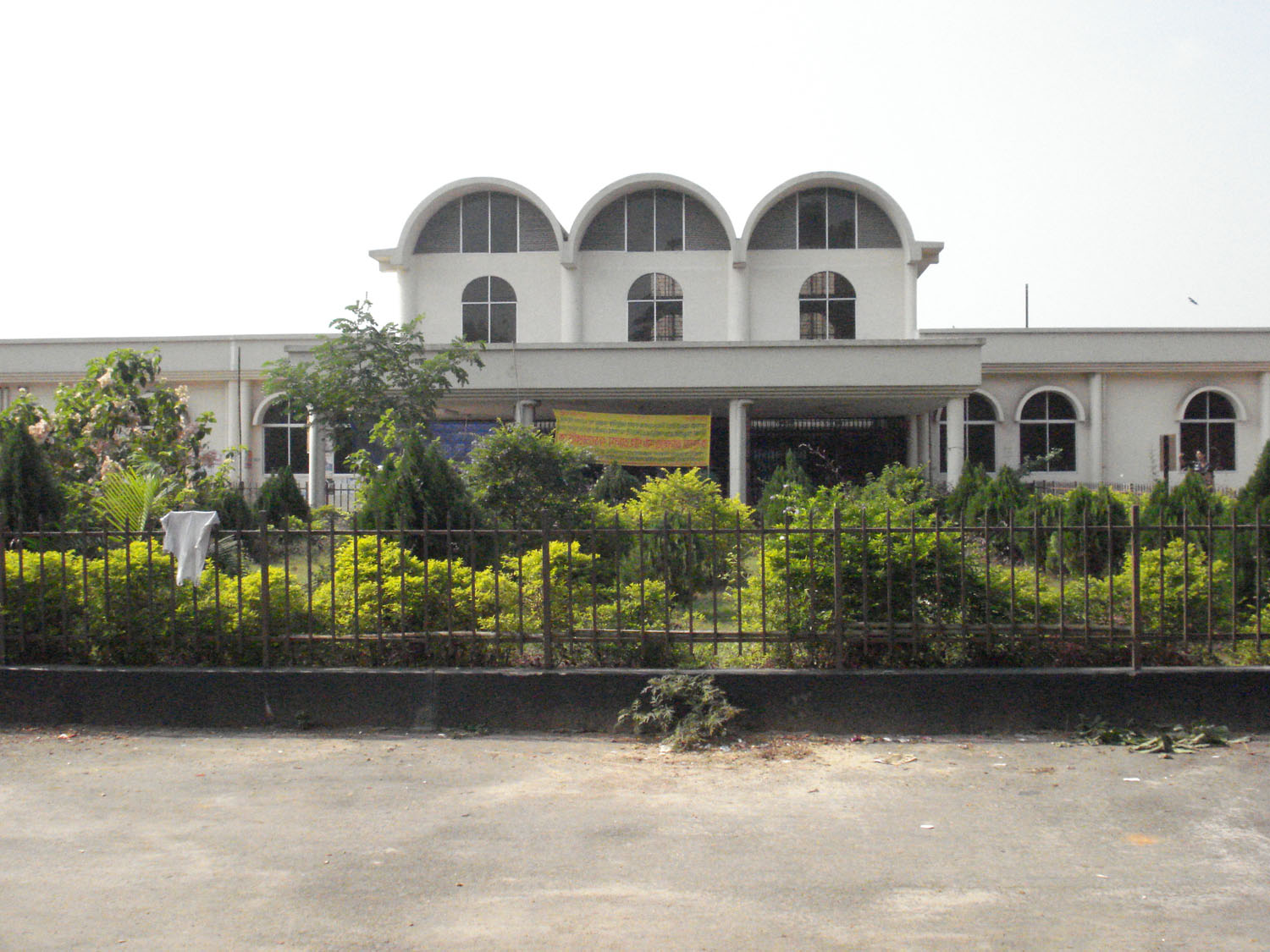
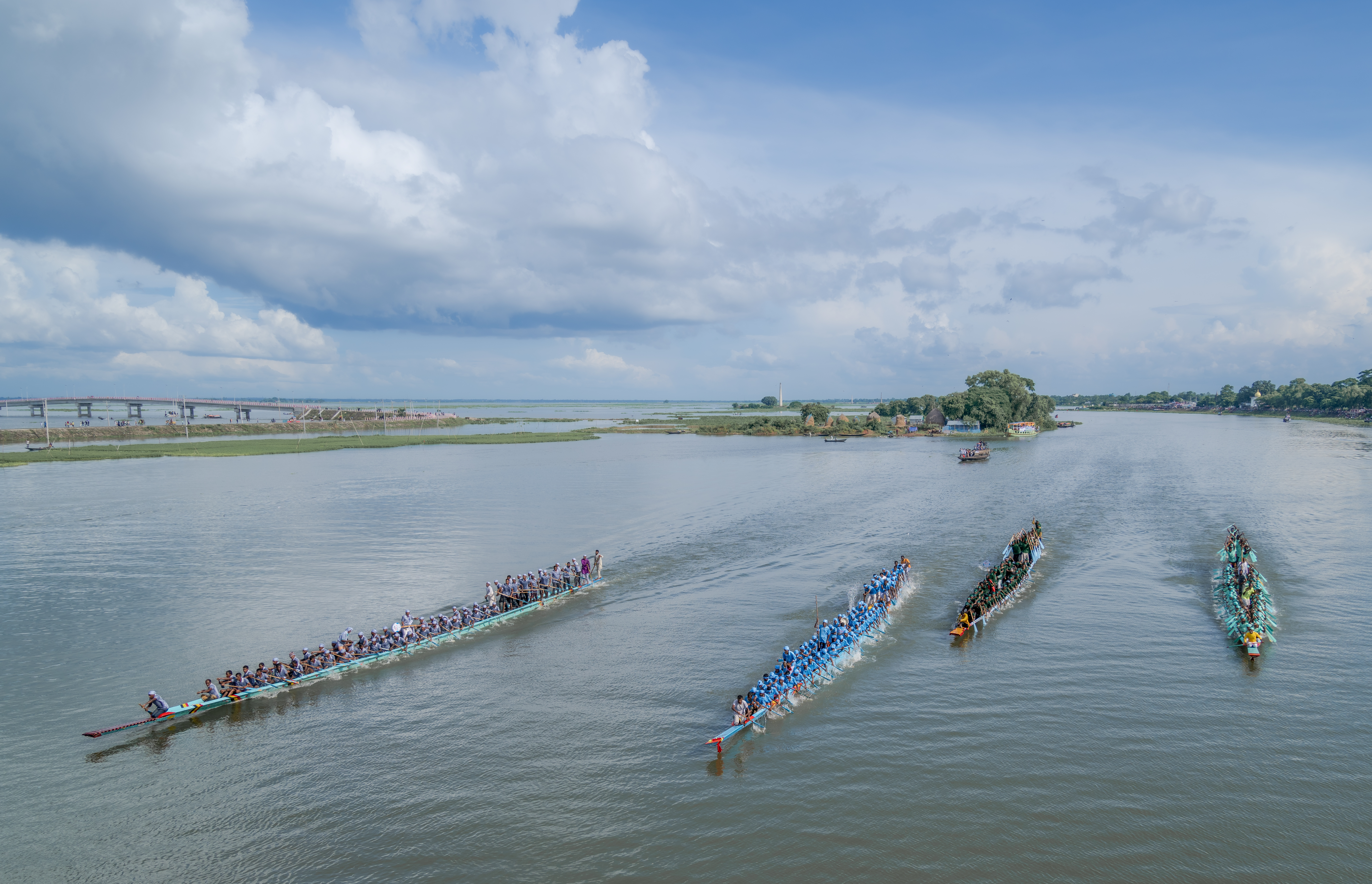
- Clockwise from top-left: Jamia Islamia Yunusia, Haripur Barabari, Akhaura Junction railway station, Nouka Baich, Martyrs Cemetery
- Interactive map of Brahmanbaria District
- Coordinates: 23°59′N 91°07′E
- Country: Bangladesh
- Division: Chittagong
- Established: 15 February 1984 (split from Comilla)
- Headquarters: Brahmanbaria

Government
  - Deputy Commissioner: Md Abu Sayeed

Area
  - Total: 1,881.20 km^{2} (726.34 sq mi)

Population (2022)
  - Total: 3,306,563
  - Density: 1,757.69/km^{2} (4,552.39/sq mi)
- Demonym: Brahmanbarian
- Time zone: UTC+06:00 (BST)
- Postal code: 3400
- Area code: 0851
- ISO 3166 code: BD-04
- HDI (2018): 0.614 medium · 7th of 21
- Website: www.brahmanbaria.gov.bd

Brahmanbaria District (Bengali: ব্রাহ্মণবাড়িয়া জেলা, romanized: Brammôṇbaṛiya) is a district in eastern Bangladesh located in the Chittagong Division. Geographically, it is mostly farmland and is topographically part of the Gangetic Plain. It is bounded by the districts of Kishoreganj and Habiganj to the north, Narsingdi District and Narayanganj to the west, Comilla to the south, and the Indian state of Tripura to the east. It was a part of Comilla District until 15 February 1984.

== History ==
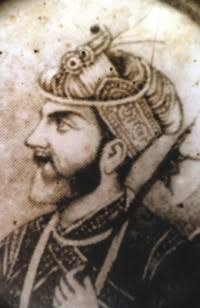
Isa Khan, leader of Bengal's 16th-century Baro-Bhuiyan rebel chieftains, had his capital situated in Sarail.

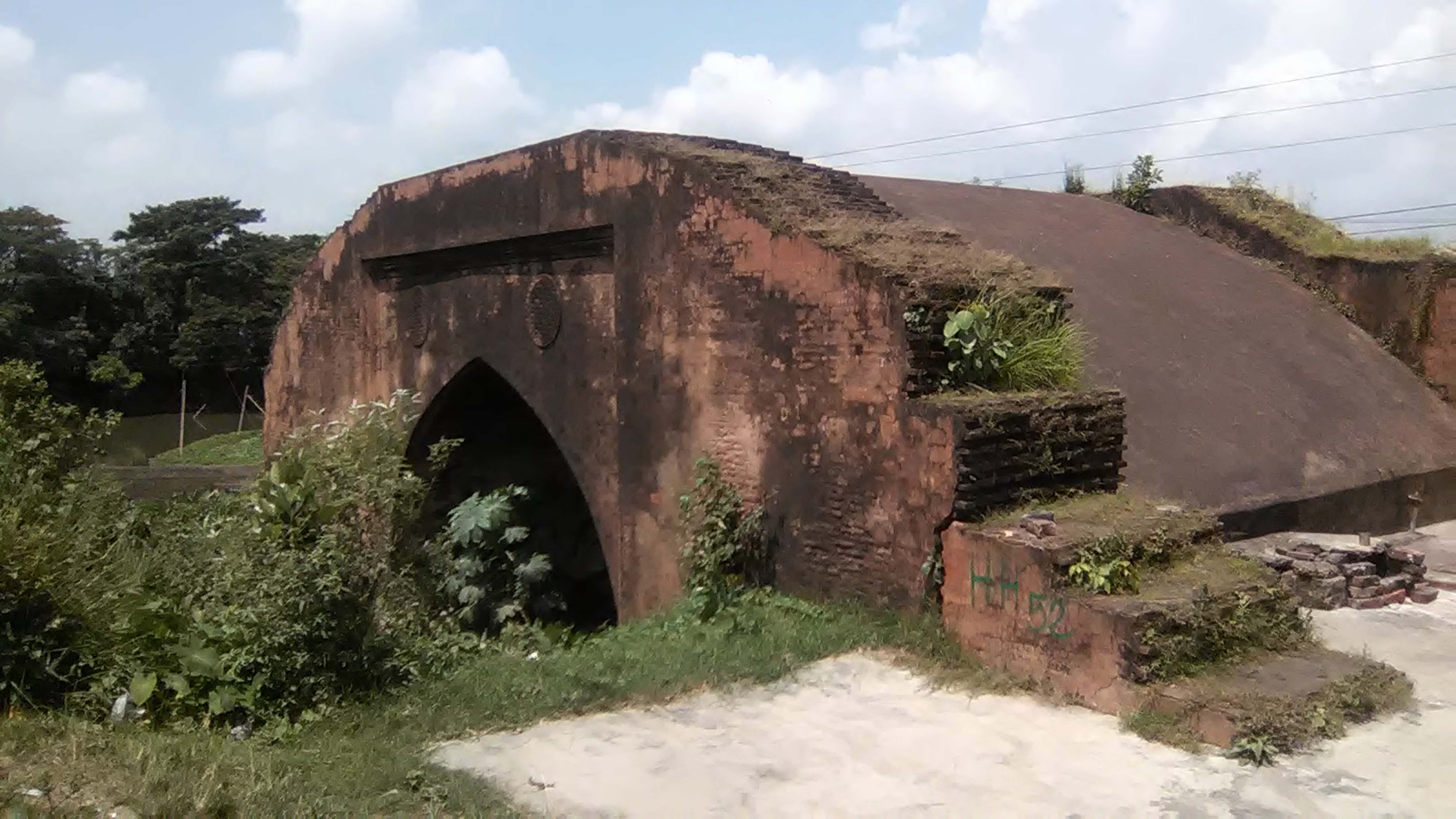
The Hatirpul, a medieval elephant pass built in Bariura.

Brahmanbaria was a part of Samatata region of ancient Bengal. Before the reign of Alauddin Husain Shah, the sultan of Bengal, Brahmanbaria was part of Tripura. In 1513, Husain Shah defeated the king of Tripura, Dhanya Manikya, in battle, and succeeded to annex at least some portion of the territory of Tripura, which included modern Brahmanbaria. He also established the fort of Kaliagarh in Tripuri territory (which later became the modern town of Kasba, Brahmanbaria). The area Syed Mahmud resided in was named Kazipara (Kazi being a variant of Qadi) after him, and his mazar (mausoleum) remains there.

The leader of the Baro-Bhuiyan zamindars, Isa Khan, had his first and temporary capital situated in Sarail. Brahmanbaria was made part of the Sylhet Sarkar. During the Mughal era, Brahmanbaria was famous for producing quality cloth muslin.

Brahmanbaria was made one of the three subdivisions of Comilla District by the British colonialists in 1790. The Brahmanbaria Municipality was established in 1868. During the 19th century, Brahmanbaria produced many nationalist leaders like Nawab Syed Shamsul Huda, who became president of the All India Muslim League in 1921 and Barrister Abdur Rasul, a front ranking leader of Indian National Congress. When the Swadeshi movement began in the wake of the 1905 Partition of Bengal, Brahmanbaria-born revolutionary Ullaskar Datta Aviram was convicted for throwing bomb explosion and was deported to the Andamans. It became part of East Pakistan in 1947. Upon encouragement of Oli Ahad, a Brahmanbarian Bengali language movement leader, the movement obtained momentum in this district in 1952.

During the Bangladesh War of Independence in 1971, Mohammad Mostafa Kamal faced a heroic death in an encounter with the Pakistani army at Daruin in what is now Akhaura Upazila. In 2015, a pot of 200-year-old coins was found in the district's Akhaura Upazila. There were nearly 500 coins at the Temple of Durga in Mogra Union and contained images of British queen Elizabeth I and were from 1804, 1814 and 1836. According to the police, the coins were handed over to the Department of Archaeology.

In March 2013, a deadly tornado killed at least 31 people in 25 villages and caused serious damage.

== Demographics ==
Historical population
Year	Pop.	±% p.a.
1974	1,473,049	—
1981	1,728,272	+2.31%
1991	2,141,745	+2.17%
2001	2,398,254	+1.14%
2011	2,840,498	+1.71%
2022	3,306,563	+1.39%

According to the 2022 Census of Bangladesh, Brahmanbaria District had 712,578 households and a population of 3,306,563 with an average of 4.57 people per household. Among the population, 798,979 (24.16%) inhabitants were under 10 years of age. The population density was 1,758 people per km^{2}. Brahmanbaria District had a literacy rate (age 7 and over) of 72.12%, compared to the national average of 74.80%, and a sex ratio of 1149 females per 1000 males. Approximately, 20.62% of the population lived in urban areas. The ethnic population was 672.

Religions in Brahmanbaria District (2022)
Religion	Percent
Islam	93.29%
Hinduism	6.68%
Other or not stated	0.03%

Religion in present-day Brahmanbaria District
Religion	1941 (Note: Brahmanbaria subdivision of Tippera district)		1981		1991		2001		2011		2022	
Religion	Pop.	%	Pop.	%	Pop.	%	Pop.	%	Pop.	%	Pop.	%
Islam	712,470	68.52%	1,541,739	89.21%	1,943,271	90.73%	2,195,583	91.55%	2,627,810	92.51%	3,084,642	93.29%
Hinduism	326,888	31.44%	184,809	10.69%	194,333	9.07%	201,843	8.42%	211,899	7.46%	220,960	6.68%
Others (Note: Including Jainism, Christianity, Buddhism, Zoroastrianism, Judaism, Ad-Dharmis, or not stated)	445	0.04%	1,724	0.10%	4,141	0.20%	828	0.03%	789	0.03%	961	0.03%
Total Population	1,039,803	100%	1,728,272	100%	2,141,745	100%	2,398,254	100%	2,840,498	100%	3,306,563	100%

In 2011, Muslims made up 92.51% of the population, while Hindus were 7.46% of the population. In 2022, Muslims were 93.29% and Hindus 6.68% of the population.

== Administration ==
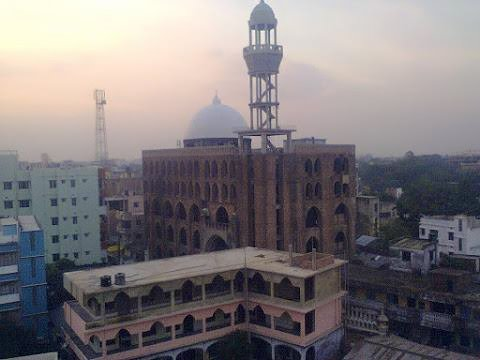
Drone shot of Jamia Islamia Yunusia located in the neighbourhood of Paikpara in Brahmanbaria city.

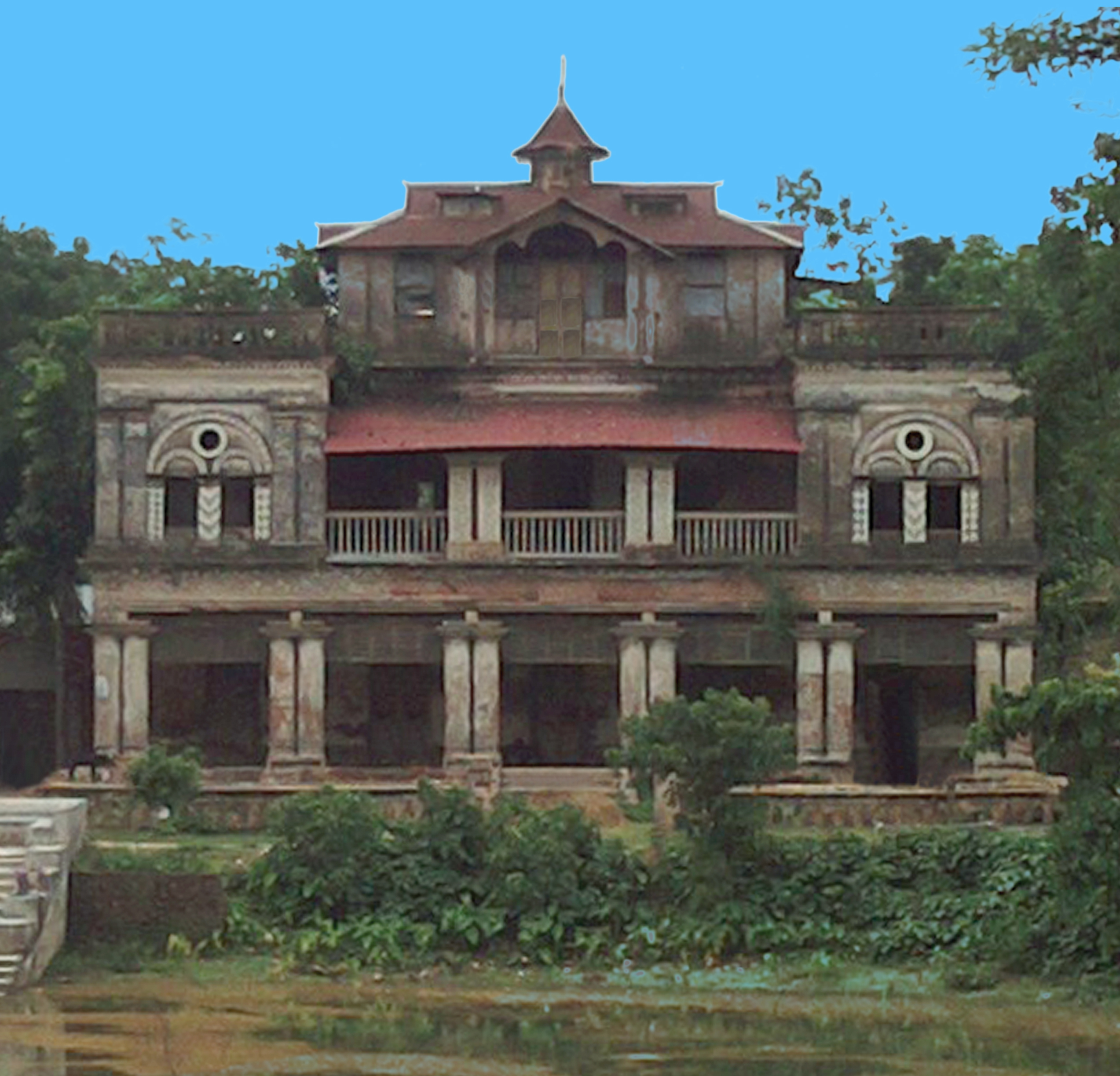
The Gokarna Nawab Bari Complex, built by Nawab Sir Syed Shamsul Huda in Nasirnagar.

Brahmanbaria District, previously a subdivision of Comilla district (formerly Tippera district till 1960), was established in 1984. The district has 4 municipalities, 39 wards, 97 mahallas, 9 upazilas, 98 union parishads, 1081 moussakas and 1329 villages.

The administrative seat and largest city is Brahmanbaria. The towns of Akhaura and Ashuganj also rank in the top three of the district.

=== Upazilas ===
Brahmanbaria District upazila geocode map

Brahmanbaria district is divided into nine upazilas: Brahmanbaria Sadar, Kasba, Akhaura, Ashuganj, Bancharampur, Bijoynagar, Nasirnagar, Nabinagar and Sarail.

=== Parliamentary constituencies ===
There are six Jatiya Sangsad constituencies in the district. These constituencies and the current Members of Parliament are:

- National seat no. 243 – Brahmanbaria-1 (Current MP: M. A. Hannan, Bangladesh Nationalist Party)
- National seat no. 244 – Brahmanbaria-2 (Current MP: Rumin Farhana, Independent)
- National seat no. 245 – Brahmanbaria-3 (Current MP: Md. Khaled Hossain Mahbub, Bangladesh Nationalist Party)
- National seat no. 246 Brahmanbaria-4 (Current MP: Mushfiqur Rahman, Bangladesh Nationalist Party)
- National seat no. 247 – Brahmanbaria-5 (Current MP: Md. Abdul Mannan, Bangladesh Nationalist Party)
- National seat no. 248 - Brahmanbaria-6 (Current MP: Md. Jonaid Abdur Rahim Saki, Gonoshonghoti Andolon, State Minister of planning.)

=== District Magistrates ===
Deputy Commissioner (DC), or District Magistrate, is the chief administrative and revenue officer of Brahmanbaria District. The following is a list of those that held this office:

List of DCs of Brahmanbaria District

List of DC
Number	Name	Term
01	Muhammad Nizam ad-Din	15/2/1984 - 4/8/1986
02	AZM Shafiqul Islam	4/8/1986 - 6/3/1989
03	Khan Shahab ad-Din	6/3/1989 - 8/1/1991
04	Kabir ad-Din Ahmad	8/1/1991 - 2/3/1993
05	Muhammad Abd al-Matin	2/3/1993 - 15/11/1995
06	Muhammad Ghulam Kibriya	22/11/1995 - 28/10/1996
07	AKM Wahidul Islam	28/10/1996 - 15/7/1999
08	Lutfur Rahman	15/7/1999 - 29/3/2001
09	Badrul Alam Tarafdar	29/3/2001 - 1/1/2002
10	Muhammad Muqsid Ali	3/1/2002 - 30/11/2003
11	Muhammad Yunusur Rahman	30/11/2003 - 21/7/2004
12	Muhammad Zahirul Haq	21/7/2004 - 23/4/2005
13	Muhammad Saidur Rahman	23/4/2005 - 21/9/2006
14	Muhammad Ali Akbar	21/9/2006 - 16/11/2006
15	Syed Ahmad Chhapa	19/11/2006 - 14/5/2007
16	Muhammad Abd al-Hayy	14/5/2007 - 17/4/2009
17	Muhammad Hayyul Qayyum	26/4/2009 - 26/4/2010
18	Muhammad Abd al-Mannan	26/4/2010 - 20/10/2012
19	Nur Muhammad Majumdar	21/10/2012 - 28/12/2013
20	Muhammad Musharraf Husayn	28/12/2013 - 19/9/2016
21	Rezwanur Rahman	19/9/2016 -
22	Hayat ud-Dawlah Khan	9/10/2018 - 5/01/2022
22	Md Shahgir Alam	13/01/2022-present

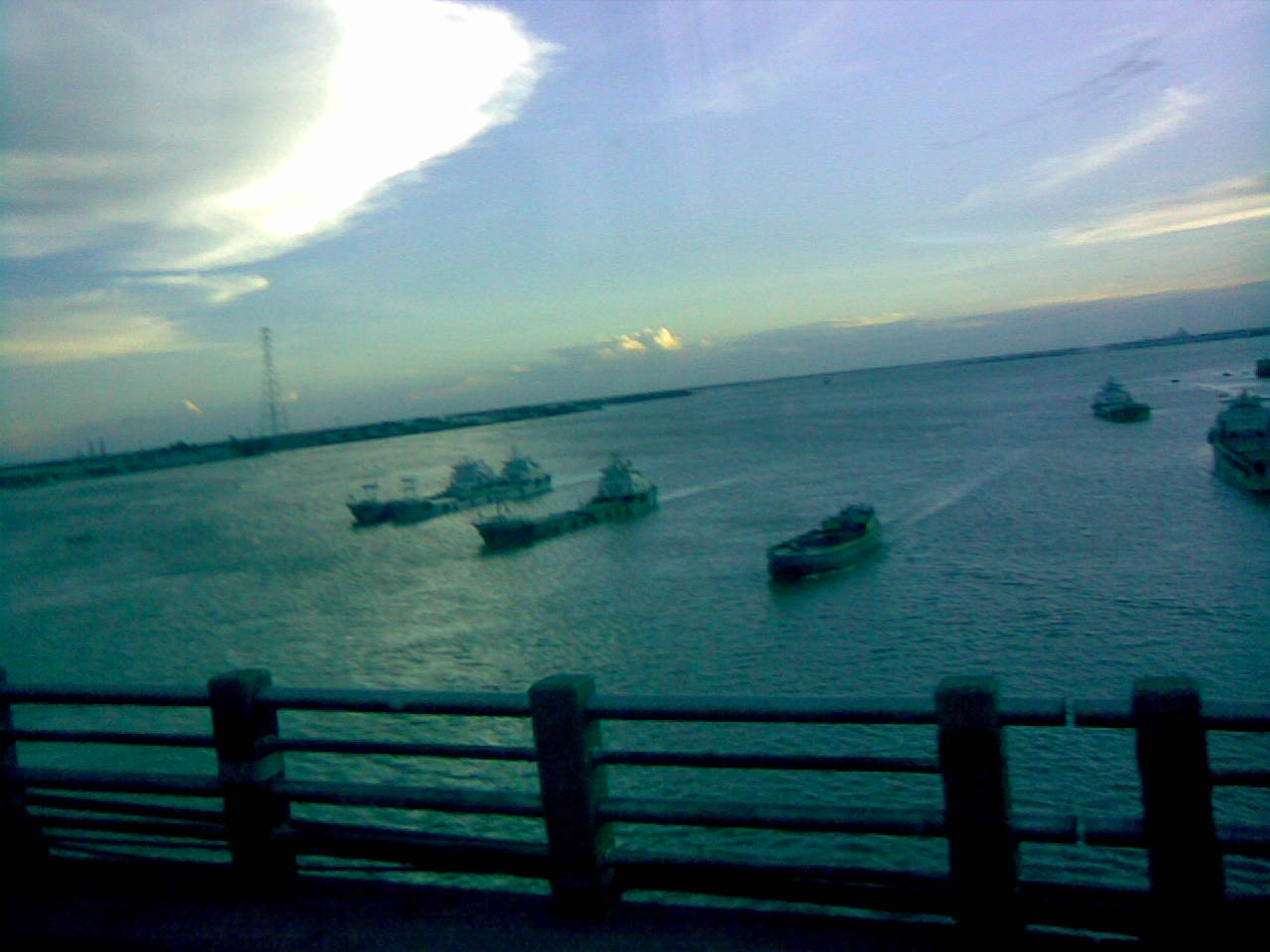
Port of Ashuganj on Meghna River, will be largest port by 2030.

== Economy ==
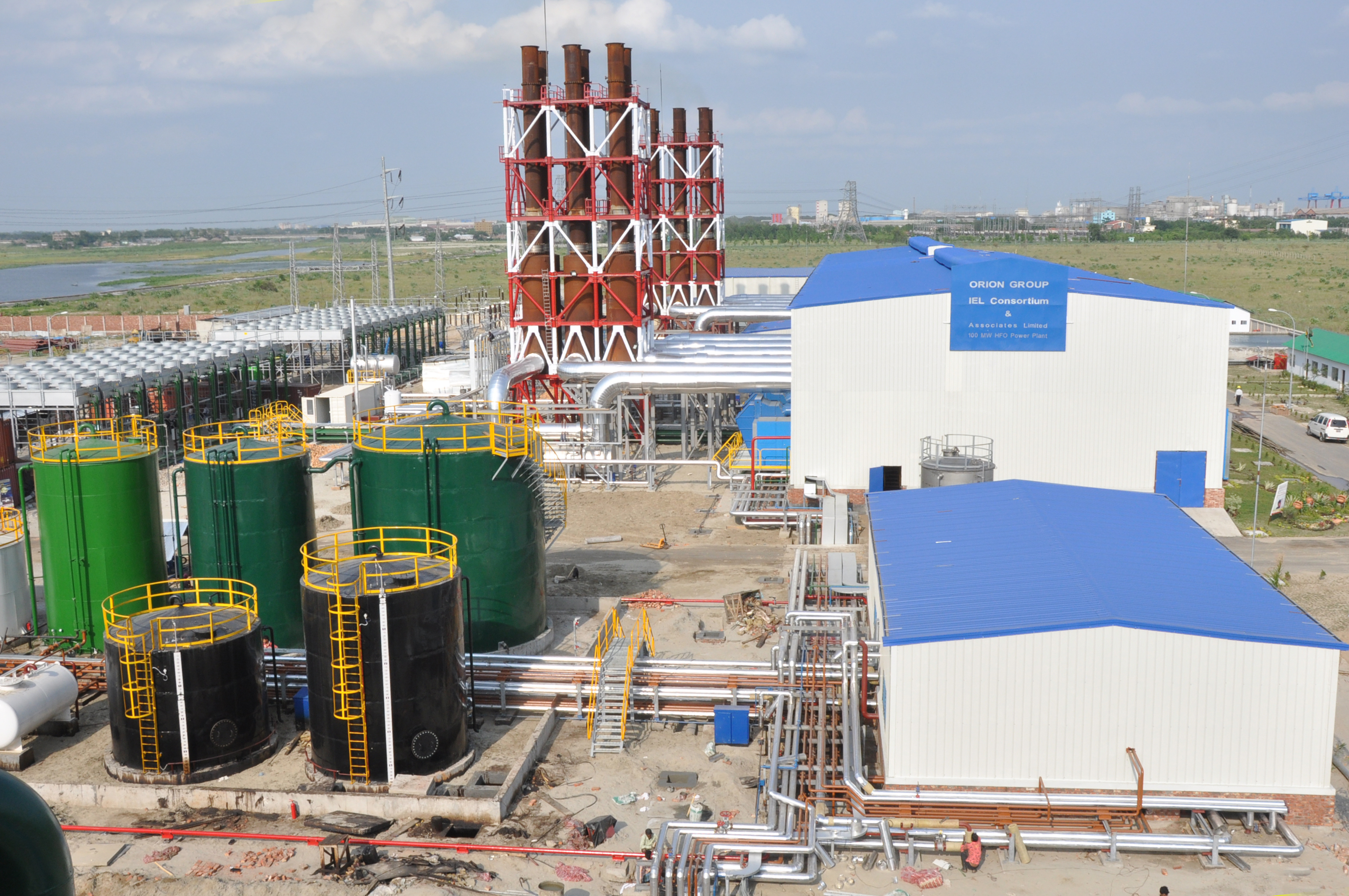
Power plant

Brahmanbaria is one of the fastest growing districts in the country. The major industries of Brahmanbaria District have been: agriculture, fishing, power and electricity, and natural gas. 30% of its population is below the poverty threshold. It has a labour force of 1,800,000 that are skilled in agricultural, industrial, and service sectors. As of 2010, it had an unemployment rate of 3.8%.

=== Power and gas ===
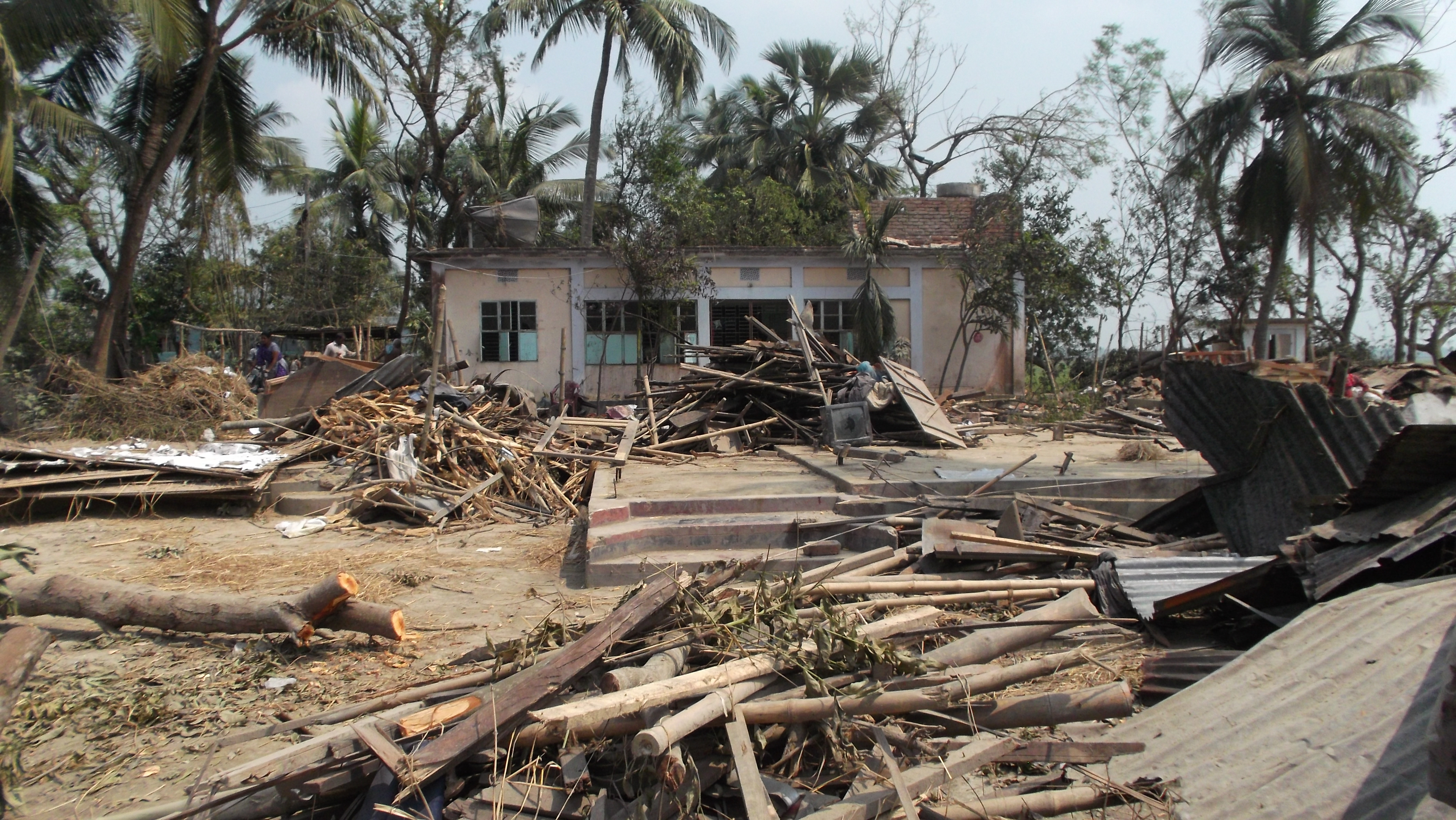
Tornado aftermath in Brahmanbaria, 2013.

Brahmanbaria's Titas gas is the largest gas field of Bangladesh. It supplies natural gas to Dhaka and most other parts of the nation. Currently the government is drilling new wells.

In some other parts of Brahmanbaria, gas was found. It resulted in an abrupt fall in the price of gas. Many parts of the country people are using gas in many illegal ways. Now, the government is trying to solve that issue.

=== Transport ===
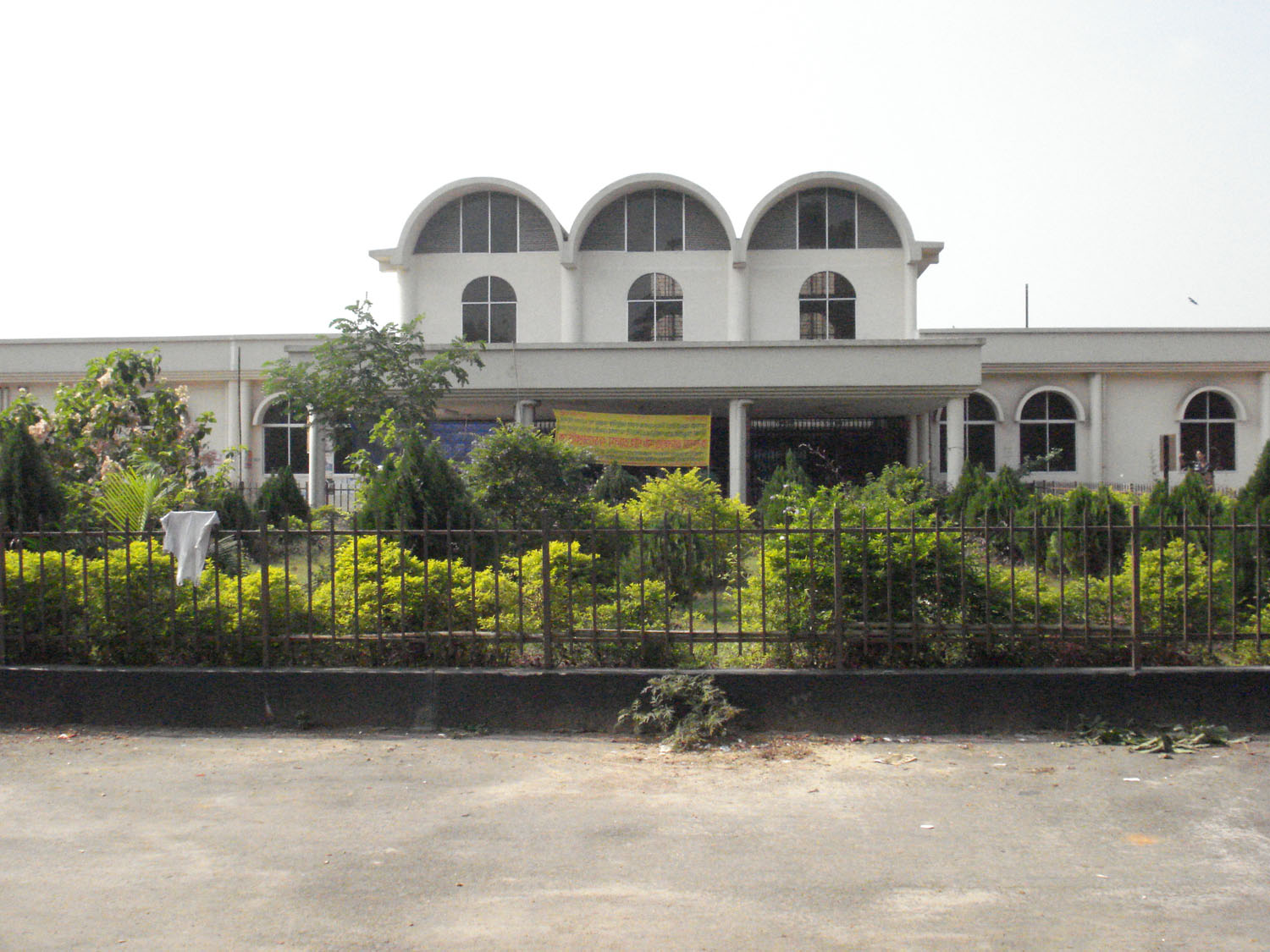
Akhaura-the largest railway junction in Bangladesh.

This district has the largest railway junction in the country at Akhaura. It connects to Kulaura and Chhatak with the Akhaura–Kulaura–Chhatak line, to Laksam and Chittagong with the Akhaura–Laksam–Chittagong line, and to Tongi and Bhairab with the Tongi–Bhairab–Akhaura line. There are about ten railway stations in the district. Recently the government of India shipped machines of the Palatana project from Kolkata to Agartala by using the Ashuganj river port on Meghna in Brahmanbaria district. Rail networks linking it to other parts of the country include the Parabat Express and Kalni Express. Brahmanbaria connects with the Asian Highway Network through the N2 highway and there is also the prominent N102 highway. To connect with India, government of both Bangladesh and India is building 15 km railway from Akhaura to Agartala.

Ouster Prime Minister of Bangladesh Sheikh Hasina gave the Government of India permission to use the Port of Ashuganj. In addition, Akhaura Station will be connected to Agartala.

=== Tourism ===
Brahmanbaria has a number of tourist attractions and sites dating back many centuries. The Kharampur Mazar Sharif is a mausoleum complex located in Akhaura which attracts hundreds of visitors. It contains the tomb of Syed Ahmad Gesudaraz, a 14th-century Islamic preacher who took part in the Conquest of Sylhet before settling in Kharampur where he was martyred. During the dewani of Shahbaz Khan in 1650, the Hatirpul was constructed. It was a bridge built over the canal mainly for elephant pass. The Mughal dewans used to communicate by the elephant in this road and also took rest near this bridge. In 1662, the Arifil Mosque was constructed by Shah Arif in Sarail. There are unknown tombs located near the mosque, supposedly the wives of Isa Khan. The 18th century Haripur Barabari was a residential palace located in Nasirnagar and many movies have been filmed there. The India-Bangladesh Border Haat located in Kasba is a weekly marketplace and allows communication with the people of the neighbouring country. Sports fans assemble at the Niaz Mohammad Stadium which was constructed in 1934.

=== Criticism ===
In 2015, Brahmanbaria faced problems of road blocks due to political agitation. The situation did not last very long before being resolved. This region also faced with clashing between two groups. In 2015, a man was killed for facing problems between two groups. Former Chief Justice of Bangladesh, Surendra Kumar Sinha had said while he was delivering his speech in Brahmanbaria that smuggling was hurting the national the economy. Gold and dollar are going out of the country, he said.
