= List of colleges and universities in Brahmanbaria District =

Brahmanbaria District of Bangladesh has 1 university, 47 colleges, and several specialized tertiary education institutions.

== Universities ==
The only university in the district is the private University of Brahmanbaria, established in 2019. Its temporary campus is on Bypass Road, Datiara, Brahmanbaria.

== Law colleges ==
The only college of law in the district is the private Brahmanbaria Law College, in Medda, Brahmanbaria.

== Medical colleges ==
Brahmanbaria Medical College is the only medical college in the district recognized by the Bangladesh Medical and Dental Council. Located in Ghatura, Brahmanbaria, it is a private institution. Instruction began in 2013. Previously affiliated with the University of Chittagong, as of 2023 it is affiliated with Chittagong Medical University.

== Homeopathic colleges ==
Brahmanbaria Homoeopathic Medical College is the only homeopathic college in the district recognized by the Bangladesh Homeopathic Board. Located at Kazipara, Brahmanbaria, it is a private institution.

== Master's level colleges ==
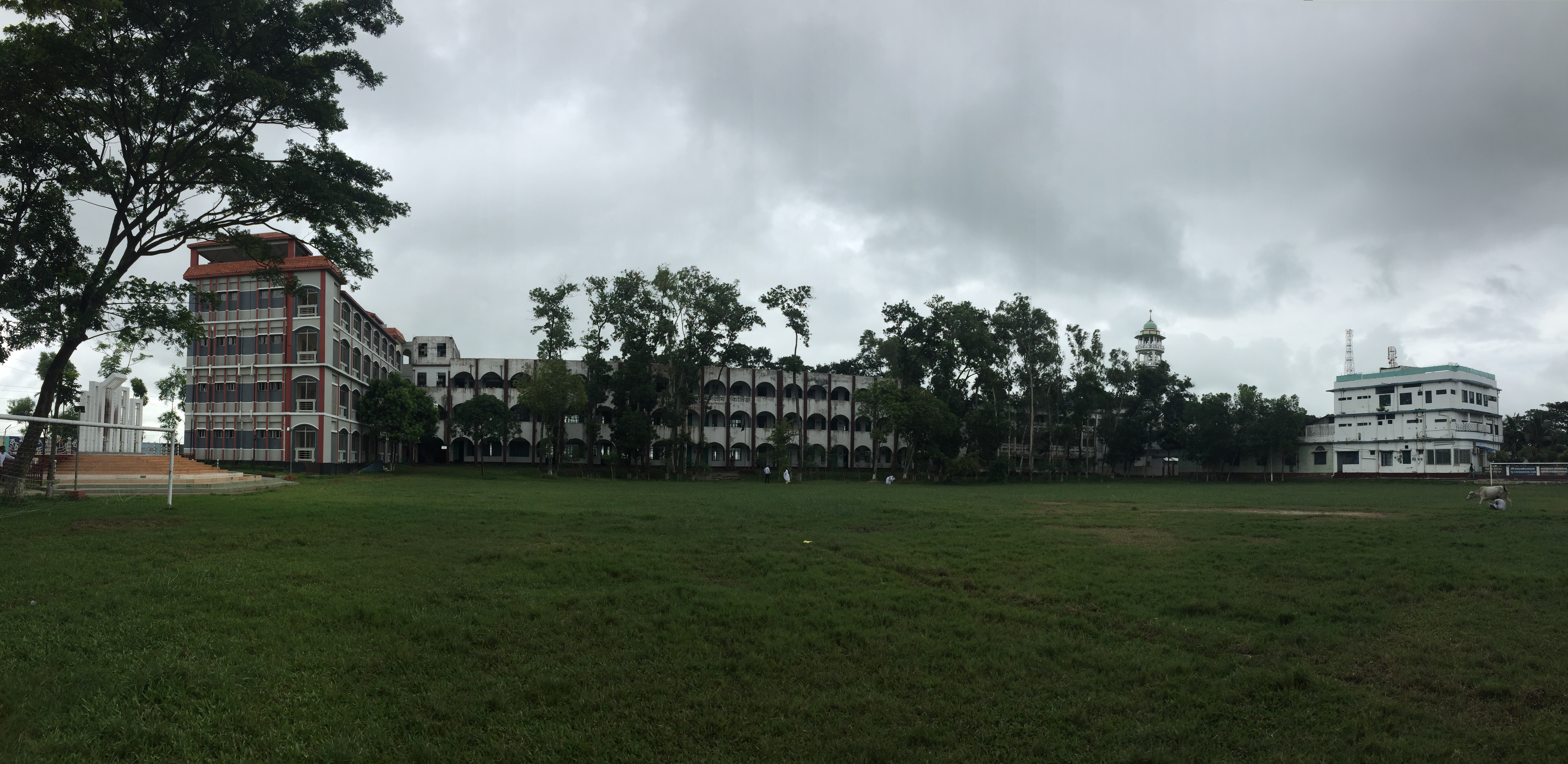
Kazi Mohammad Shafiqul Islam Degree Mohabiddalaya is one of two master's level colleges in the district.

There are two master's level colleges in the district. Brahmanbaria Government College in Mourail, Brahmanbaria, is public. It was established in 1948. Kazi Mohammad Shafiqul Islam Degree Mohabiddalaya in Islampur, Bijoynagar Upazila, is private.

== Degree colleges (honors) ==
College	Location	Upazila	Management	Est.
Adarsha Degree College	Saydabad	Kasba	Public	
Alimuddin Zobeda College	Kaitala	Nabinagar	Private	
Aruail Abdus Sattar College	Aruail	Sarail	Private	
Bancharampur Degree College	Jagannatpur	Bancharampur	Public	1973
Brahmanbaria Government Women College	Sadar Hospital Road	Brahmanbaria Sadar	Public	1964
Brahmanbaria Pouro Degree College	East Medda	Brahmanbaria Sadar	Private	
Chinair Bangabandhu Sheikh Mujib Degree College	Chinair	Brahmanbaria Sadar	Private	1994
Firoz Miah Degree College	Ashuganj	Ashuganj	Public	
Gopinathpur Al-Haj Shah Alam College	Gopinathpur	Kasba	Private	
Kasba Mohila Degree College	Kasba	Kasba	Private	
Kasba T. Ali University College	Kasba	Kasba	Private	
Nabinagar Government College	Nabinagar	Nabinagar	Public	1969
Salimgonj College	Salimgonj	Nabinagar	Private	
Sarail Degree College	Kalikachchha	Sarail	Public	1984

== Degree colleges (pass) ==
College	Location	Upazila	Management	Est.
Chargas N. I. Bhuiyan Degree College	Chargachh	Kasba	Private	
Chatalpar College	Chatalpar	Nasirnagar	Private	
Kalsher Nayeema Alam Mohila College	Kalsher	Kasba	Private	
Mia Abdullah Wazed Women's Degree College	Khuti	Kasba	Private	
Nabinagar Mahila College	Nabinagar	Nabinagar	Private	
Nasirnagar Degree College	Nasirnagar	Nasirnagar	Public	
Shaheed Smriti College Akhawra	Radhanagar	Akhaura	Public	1972
Suhilpur Alhaj Harun Al Rashid College	Suhilpur	Brahmanbaria Sadar	Private	
Sur Samrat Alauddin Khan College	Shibpur	Nabinagar	Private	
Tajul Islam Adarsha College	Darikandi	Bancharampur	Private	

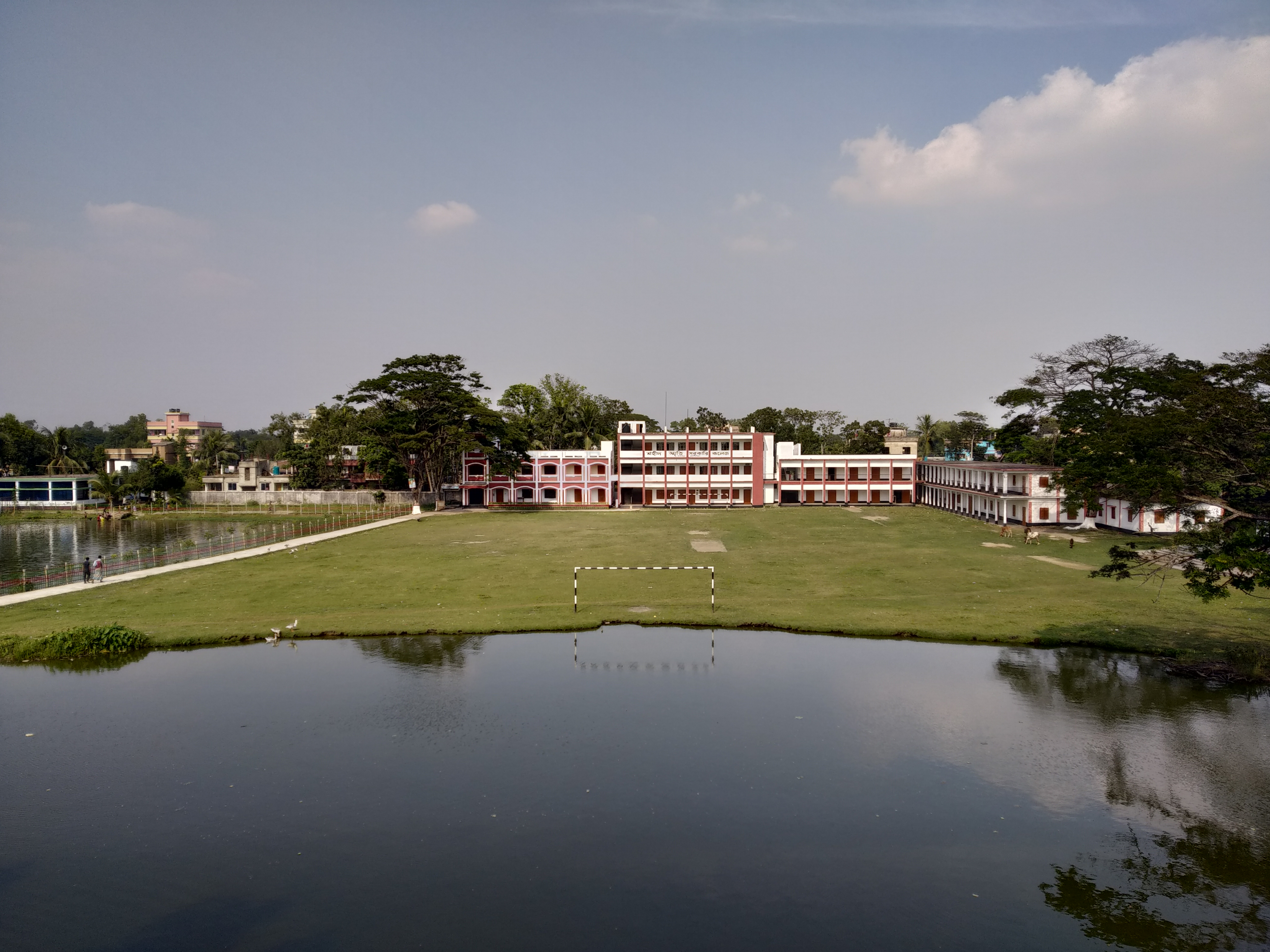
Shaheed Smriti College Akhawra in 2018

== Colleges ==
College	Location	Upazila	Management	Est.
A Monem College	Bijeswar	Brahmanbaria Sadar	Private	
Abbas Uddin Khan Shohagpur Model College	Shohagpur	Ashuganj	Private	
Akhaura Cambrian College	Daruin	Akhaura	Private	
Alhaj Begum Nurunnnahar College	Narshingsar	Brahmanbaria Sadar	Private	
Ankur Onneysa Bidyapith	Poniaout	Brahmanbaria Sadar	Private	
Bayek Alhaj Shah Alam College	Bayek	Kasba	Private	
Brahmanbaria Government College	Collegepara	Brahmanbaria Sadar	Government	
Bitghar Danabir Moheshchandra Bhattacharjee Biddapith	Bitghar	Nabinagar	Private	
Brahmanbaria City Model College	T A Road	Brahmanbaria Sadar	Private	
Bangladesh Gas Field College	Birashar	Brahmanbaria Sadar	Private	
Brahmanbaria United College	Mourail	Brahmanbaria Sadar	Private	
Champaknagar Obaidul Muktadir Chowdhury College	Fatehpur	Bijoynagar	Private	
Dr. Roushan Alam College	Fardabad	Bancharampur	Private	
Jahanara Huq Mohila College	Kharampur Road	Akhaura	Private	
Laur Fatehpur Barrister Zakir Ahammad College	Laur Fatehpur	Nabinagar	Private	
Md Nurul Islam College	Khoshkandi	Bancharampur	Private	
Obaidul Muktadir Chowdhury Mohila College	Murail	Brahmanbaria Sadar	Private	
Purbachal College	Bishnapur	Bijoynagar	Private	
Sarail Mahila College	Sarail	Sarail	Private	
Shah Rahat Ali College	Saifullakandi	Bancharampur	Private	
Sujan Dulo College	Rupasdi	Bancharampur	Private	
Tinni Anwar Mohila College	Kamaura	Ashuganj	Private	
Titas Model College	Sahbazpur	Sarail	Private	
Wisdom College	Ramrail	Brahmanbaria Sadar	Private	
LAXMIMAYEE SANSKRIT COLLEGE	Brahmanbaria Sadar	Brahmanbaria	Private (Bangladesh Sanskrit & Pali Education Board, Dhaka)	

== Nursing institutes ==
The private Model General Hospital Nursing Institute on College Road, Brahmanbaria, and the public Nursing Institute Brahmangaria are recognized by the Bangladesh Nursing and Midwifery Council.

== Medical technology institutes ==
United Care Institute of Medical Technology, located in Ghatura, Brahmanbaria, is affiliated with the Faculty of Medicine at the University of Chittagong.

== See also ==
- Economy of Brahmanbaria
