= Kasba Upazila =

Kasba upazila কসবা
- Upazila
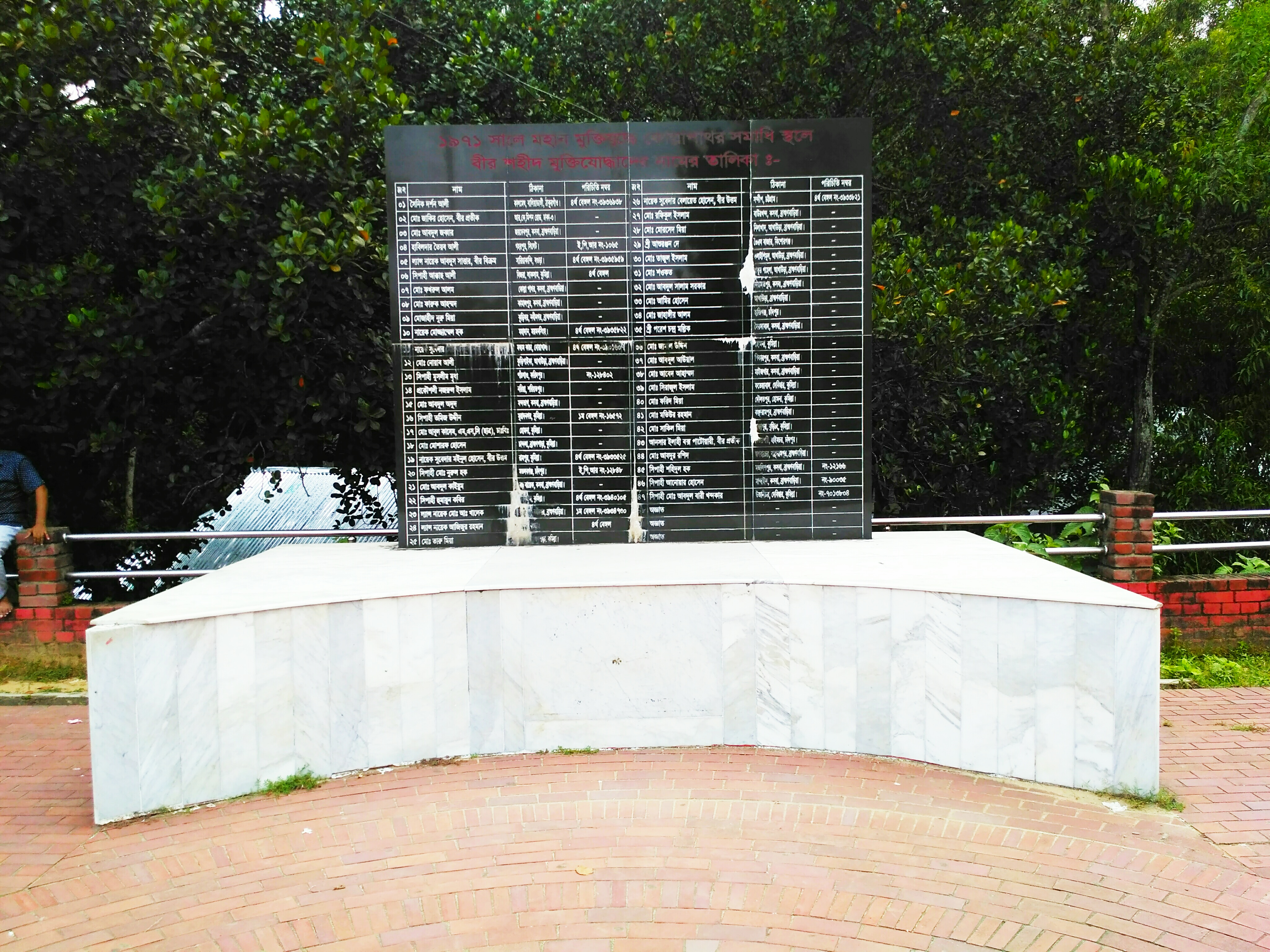
- Martyrs Memorial at Kullapathar

- Coordinates: 23°44′N 91°10′E
- Country: Bangladesh
- Division: Chittagong
- District: Brahmanbaria

Area
  - Total: 209.77 km^{2} (80.99 sq mi)
  - Urban: 16.86 km^{2} (6.51 sq mi)

Population (2022)
  - Total: 357,961
  - Density: 1,706.4/km^{2} (4,419.7/sq mi)
  - Urban: 40,416
- Time zone: UTC+6 (BST)
- Postal code: 3460
- Area code: 08524
- Website: kasba.brahmanbaria.gov.bd

Kasba Upazila mauza geocode map

Kasba (Bengali: কসবা) is an upazila of Brahmanbaria District, Chittagong Division in east-central Bangladesh. It is located approximately 150 km north of Chittagong and was part of greater Cumilla District until 1984.

== History ==
Present-day Kasba was formerly known as kailashghar, which was said to have been a corruption of Qilagarh wherein qila referred to an army cantonment and garh referred to a fort. Before the reign of Alauddin Husain Shah, this area was part of Tripura. In 1513, during his invasion of Tripura, Husain Shah established the fort of Kaliagarh in Tripuri territory, and succeeded to annex the eastern portion of Tripura. A town was established around the fort and was later renamed Kasba, a common place name that is used in the Muslim world to refer to a medina quarter or citadel.

== Geography ==
Kasba is located in southeast Brahmanbaria District. It has a total area of 209.77 km^{2} (80.99 sq mi). It is bordered by Akhaura Upazila, Brahmanbaria Sadar Upazila and Nabinagar Upazila to the north, Brahmanpara Upazila to the south, Tripura State of India to the east, and Nabinagar, Muradnagar and Brahmanpara Upazilas of Cumilla district to the west. The geography of the upazila is characterized by low-lying land with small hills and hillocks of red soil.

== Demographics ==
Religions in Kasba Upazila (2022)
Religion	Percent
Islam	96.23%
Hinduism	3.76%
Other or not stated	0.01%

According to the 2022 Bangladeshi census, Kasba Upazila had 80,287 households and a population of 357,961. 11.48% of the population were under 5 years of age. Kasba had a literacy rate (age 7 and over) of 77.10%: 77.04% for males and 77.14% for females, and a sex ratio of 85.10 males for every 100 females. 67,820 (18.95%) lived in urban areas.

According to the 2011 Census of Bangladesh, Kasba Upazila had 60,919 households and a population of 319,221. 89,894 (28.16%) were under 10 years of age. Kasba had a literacy rate (age 7 and over) of 50.68%, compared to the national average of 51.8%, and a sex ratio of 1102 females per 1000 males. 40,416 (12.66%) lived in urban areas.

According to the 1991 Bangladesh census, Kasba had a population of 243833. Males constituted 50.69% of the population, and females 49.31%. The majority of the population was Muslim (94.59%), with Hindus at 5.40% and others at 0.01%. The population aged 18 or over was 112,611. Kasba had an average literacy rate of 30.7% (7+ years), compared to the national average of 32.4%.

== Points of Interest ==
The upazila is home to Bangladesh's first Quran sculpture, a 16-foot monument situated at the Kasba Upazila Parishad intersection.

The Tarapur–Kamalasagar Border Haat is a weekly market located on the India-Bangladesh border in Kasba, designed to facilitate cross-border trade for local residents.

== Administration ==
The administration for Kasba was founded in 1908 as a police station and upgraded to an upazila in 1983.

Kasba Upazila is divided into Kasba Municipality and ten union parishads: Badair, Benauty, Bayek, Gopinathpur, Kasba Paschim, Kayempur, Kharera, Kuti, Mehari, and Mulagram. The union parishads are subdivided into 136 mauzas and 209 villages.

Kasba Municipality is subdivided into 9 wards and 34 mahallas.

The chairman of Kasba Upazila Parishad is advocate Rashedul Kawser Bhuiyan Jibon.

National Assembly (parliament) seat no. 246-Brahmanbaria-4 (Current MP, Advocate Anisul Haq, Minister of Law).

== Education ==
There are eight colleges in the upazila. They include Adarsha Degree College, Chargas N.I. Bhuyan Degree College, Gopinathpur Al-Haj Shah Alam College, Kalsher Nayeema Alam Mohila College, Kasba Mohila Degree College, Kasba T. Ali Degree College, and Mia Abdullah Wazed Women's Degree College.

According to Banglapedia, Jamsherpur High School, founded in 1923, Kasba Government High School (1899), Kheora Anandamayee High School (1975), and Kuti Atal Bihari High School (1918), Chandidwar High School (1948) are notable secondary schools.

There are many Primary & K.G School in kasba upazilla including Majlishpur Govt. Primary School & Sunmoon Kinder Garten. The madrasa education system includes one fazil madrasa. It is Purquil Gausiya Habibiya Fazil Madrasa.

== Notable people ==
- Anisul Huq, Law Minister of Bangladesh
- Hasnat Abdul Hye, writer and novelist
- Muhammed Abul Manzur, military officer
- Serajul Huq, politician
- Tafazzal Ali, deputy speaker of the Bengal Legislative Assembly, was born in Kasba in 1906.

== See also ==
- Upazilas of Bangladesh
- Districts of Bangladesh
- Divisions of Bangladesh
