= Mia Abdullah Wazed =

Bangladeshi politician

Member of Bangladesh Parliament
- In office 1991–1996
- Preceded by: Mohammad Jahangir Osman
- Succeeded by: Mohammad Shah Alam

Personal details
- Died: 2026
- Party: Bangladesh Nationalist Party

Mia Abdullah Wazed (died 2026) was a Bangladesh Nationalist Party politician and a former member of parliament for Brahmanbaria-4.

== Career ==
Wazed was elected to parliament from Brahmanbaria-4 as a Bangladesh Nationalist Party candidate in 1991.
