= Brahmanbaria-4 =

Constituency of Bangladesh's Jatiya Sangsad

Coordinates: 23.75°N 91.15°E

- Constituency for the Jatiya Sangsad
- District: Brahmanbaria District
- Division: Chittagong Division
- Electorate: 327,257 (2018)

Current constituency
- Created: 1984
- Party: Bangladesh Nationalist Party
- Member: Mushfiqur Rahman
- ← 245 Brahmanbaria-3 247 Brahmanbaria-5 →

Brahmanbaria-4 is a constituency represented in the Jatiya Sangsad (National Parliament) of Bangladesh since 2026 by Mushfiqur Rahman of the Bangladesh Nationalist Party.

== Boundaries ==
The constituency encompasses Akhaura and Kasba upazilas.

== History ==
The constituency was created in 1984 from the Comilla-4 constituency when the former Comilla District was split into three districts: Brahmanbaria, Comilla, and Chandpur.

== Members of Parliament ==
Election	Member	Party
1986	Liaquat Ali	Jatiya Party
1988	Mohammad Jahangir Osman	
1991	Mia Abdullah Wazed	Bangladesh Nationalist Party
1996	Shah Alam	Awami League
2001	Mushfiqur Rahman	Bangladesh Nationalist Party
2008	Shah Alam	Awami League
2014	Anisul Huq	Awami League
2026	Musfiqur Rahman	Bangladesh Nationalist Party

== Elections ==
=== Elections in the 2010s ===
Anisul Huq was elected unopposed in the 2014 general election after opposition parties withdrew their candidacies in a boycott of the election.

=== Elections in the 2000s ===
General Election 2008: Brahmanbaria-4
Party	Candidate	Votes	%	±%
AL	Shah Alam	118,692	58.3	+22.4
BNP	Mushfiqur Rahman	82,567	40.6	−7.7
IAB	Musleh Uddin Bhuiyan	978	0.5	N/A
Bangladesh Kalyan Party	Md. Nazrul Islam	425	0.2	N/A
Islamic Front	Mohammad Ishak	340	0.2	N/A
BKA	Md. Tazul Islam Aktari	244	0.1	N/A
BDB	Khandokar Hebjur Rahman	190	0.1	N/A
Jatiya Samajtantrik Dal-JSD	Sheikh Mohammad Badrul Alam	105	0.1	N/A
Majority		36,125	17.7	+5.3
Turnout		203,541	85.5	+17.7
AL gain from BNP				

General Election 2001: Brahmanbaria-4
Party	Candidate	Votes	%	±%
BNP	Mushfiqur Rahman	81,229	48.3	+19
AL	Shah Alam	60,340	35.9	+4.5
IJOF	Md. Salim	25,773	15.3	N/A
BIF	Delwar Hossain Bir Protik	355	0.2	N/A
KSJL	Md. Enayet Ullah Khan	265	0.2	N/A
Jatiya Party (M)	Khandokar Hebjur Rahman	136	0.1	N/A
Majority		20,889	12.4	+11.9
Turnout		168,098	67.8	−8.2
BNP gain from AL				

=== Elections in the 1990s ===
General Election June 1996: Brahmanbaria-4
Party	Candidate	Votes	%	±%
AL	Shah Alam	41,615	31.4	+8.5
JP(E)	Shahidul Hossain	40,989	31.0	+18.9
BNP	Mia Abdullah Wazed	38,815	29.3	−2.5
Jamaat	Kazi Nazrul Islam Khadem	7,913	6.0	−3.4
Independent	Pasha Ali	1,030	0.8	N/A
IOJ	Humayun Kabir	718	0.5	−0.2
Zaker Party	Hossain Ahmed Bhuiyan	296	0.2	N/A
Gano Forum	Sree Dilip Bhadra	261	0.2	N/A
Independent	Rejaur Rahman	243	0.2	N/A
Independent	Md. Nurul Haque Sarker	232	0.2	N/A
Independent	Md. Ferdous Akand	215	0.2	0.0
Independent	Jahangir Osman Bhuiyan	73	0.1	N/A
Majority		626	0.5	−8.4
Turnout		132,400	76.0	+25.6
AL gain from BNP				

General Election 1991: Brahmanbaria-4
Party	Candidate	Votes	%	±%
BNP	Mia Abdullah Wazed	37,328	31.8	
AL	Serajul Huq	26,867	22.9	
Independent	Sadeq Ali	18,429	15.7	
JP(E)	Jahangir Osman Bhuiyan	14,198	12.1	
Jamaat	Kazi Nazrul Islam Khadem	10,997	9.4	
Pragotishil Ganatantrik Sakti	Sultan Shahriar Rashid Khan	6,557	5.6	
IOJ	Humayun Kabir	829	0.7	
Zaker Party	Md. Abdul Mannan Chowdhury	762	0.7	
BAKSAL	Dilara Begum	487	0.4	
Independent	Shah Alam	319	0.3	
Independent	Md. Ferdous Akand	278	0.2	
Jatiya Samajtantrik Dal-JSD	Ali Arshad	224	0.2	
Independent	Sharif Iqbal Chowdhury	157	0.1	
Majority		10,461	8.9	
Turnout		117,432	50.4	
BNP gain from				
