= Anisul Huq (politician) =

Bangladeshi politician and lawyer

- আনিসুল হক
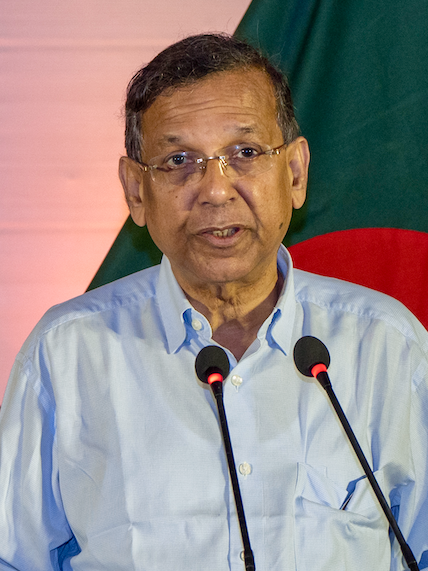
- Huq at the US Embassy in Dhaka (2022)

Minister for Law, Justice and Parliamentary Affairs
- In office 12 January 2014 – 6 August 2024
- Prime Minister: Sheikh Hasina
- Preceded by: Shafique Ahmed
- Succeeded by: Asif Nazrul (as Adviser)

Member of Parliament
- In office 29 January 2014 – 6 August 2024
- Preceded by: Mohammad Shah Alam
- Succeeded by: Mushfiqur Rahman
- Constituency: Brahmanbaria-4

Personal details
- Born: 30 March 1956 (age 70) Brahmanbaria, East Pakistan, Pakistan
- Party: Bangladesh Awami League
- Spouse: Nur Amtullah Rina
- Parent: Serajul Huq (father)
- Education: University of Dhaka (BA, MS); King's College London (LL.B, LL.M)

Anisul Huq (Bengali: আনিসুল হক; born 30 March 1956) is a Bangladeshi politician for the Awami League party and a lawyer. He served as the Minister for Law, Justice and Parliamentary Affairs from 2014 till 2024.

In August 2024, he was arrested on the charges of his alleged involvement in the July massacre.

== Early life and education ==
Anisul Huq is the son of Serajul Huq, a lawyer and a former member of Parliament. He was educated at St. Joseph Higher Secondary School, the University of Dhaka (BA (Hons) English Literature; master's in English Literature; LLB) and King's College London (LLM).

== Career ==
=== Law profession ===
Huq was enrolled as a lawyer in the Dhaka district bar in November 1985 and in the High Court Division of the Supreme Court of Bangladesh in November 1987. In 2001 he was enrolled in the Appellate Division of the Supreme Court of Bangladesh as a lawyer and became a senior advocate of the Supreme Court of Bangladesh in 2010.

On his father's death, Anisul Huq became the chief special prosecutor for both the assassination of Sheikh Mujibur Rahman case and the Jail killing. It was under his counsel that the assassination of Sheikh Mujibur Rahman case was completed and a judgment was delivered by the apex court. Anisul Huq was also the chief counsel and special prosecutor for the Anti-Corruption Commission of Bangladesh, and the chief prosecutor for the Peelkhana carnage case which relates to the mutiny of the Bangladesh Rifles in 2009. This case was also completed successfully under his leadership.

The late Serajul Huq and his son Anisul Huq both are senior advocates of the Supreme Court of Bangladesh, acted as counsel for most of the important, leading and sensitive criminal cases of the country during the 1980–2014 period.

=== Politics ===
In the general elections held on 5 January 2014, Anisul Huq was elected as a member of Parliament from the Brahmanbaria-4 (Kasba-Akhaura) constituency as a candidate of the Bangladesh Awami League. He took the oath as a member of Parliament on 9 January 2014. Thereafter he was inducted in the cabinet as a minister on 12 January 2014 and was allocated the portfolio of Ministry of Law, Justice and Parliamentary Affairs.

In the 2018 Bangladeshi general election held on 30 December 2018, Anisul Huq was again elected to Parliament from the same constituency, as a candidate of the Awami League. He took his oath as a member of Parliament on 3 January 2019. He was further appointed the Minister for the Ministry of Law, Justice and Parliamentary Affairs and took that oath on 7 January 2019 as Minister. He is the first person to be Minister of the Ministry of Law, Justice and Parliamentary Affairs for two consecutive terms for Bangladesh.

=== Arrest ===
Following the exile of Prime Minister Sheikh Hasina after an uprising, Haq was arrested on August 13 at Sadarghat while attempting to flee by boat, accompanied by former adviser to Sheikh Hasina, Salman F. Rahman. They were shown arrested in connection with the murders of a student and a hawker that took place on July 16 during the quota reform movement.

In April 2025, Huq was assaulted by pro-Bangladesh Nationalist Party lawyers at the court of Narayanganj Senior Judicial Magistrate.

== Personal life ==
Huq is married to Nur Amtullah Rina since 18 December 1987. She died on 2 January 1991 in a road accident. His mother, Jahanara Huq, was the first chairman of Citizens Bank Bangladesh.
