= Fardabad, Bangladesh =

Village in Chittagong Division, Bangladesh

Fardabad
- Village
- Location within Bangladesh
- Coordinates: 23.74453°N 90.877194°E
- Country: Bangladesh
- Division: Chittagong Division
- District: Brahmanbaria District
- Upazila: Bancharampur Upazila

Population (2025)
  - Total: 20,381
- Time zone: UTC+06:00 (BST)

Fardabad is a village in Bancharampur Upazila, Brahmanbaria District, Bangladesh. It is situated along the Titas River. According to the census of 2025, the population of the village was 20,381. The village of

== See also ==
- List of villages in Bangladesh
