= Machihata Union =

Union of Brahmanbaria Sadar Upazila under Brahmanbaria District

Machihata Union মাছিহাতা
- Union Council
- No. 13 Machihata Union Parishad
- Location within Bangladesh
- Coordinates: 23°55′38″N 91°08′15″E
- Country: Bangladesh
- Division: Chittagong
- District: Brahmanbaria
- Upazila: Brahmanbaria Sadar

Area
  - Total: 31.97 km^{2} (12.34 sq mi)

Population (2011)
  - Total: 40,509
  - Density: 1,267/km^{2} (3,282/sq mi)
- Time zone: UTC+6 (BST)
- Postal code: 3400

Machihata (Bengali: মাছিহাতা), or Machhihata, is a union council in the southern part of Brahmanbaria Sadar, Brahmanbaria, Bangladesh. It borders Suhilpur and Pattan to the north, Singerbil and Uttar Akhaura to the east, Vasudev to the south, Sultanpur and Ramrail to the west, and Brahmanbaria to the northwest. The union council covers an area of 31.97 km^{2}. As of 2011, its population is 40,509.

== Demographics ==
According to the 2011 Census of Bangladesh, the total population of Machihata Union is 40,509. Among them, 19,224 are male and 21,285 are female. Total number of households are 7,568.

== Government ==
Machihata is the 13th union council under Brahmanbaria Sadar Upazila. The administrative activities of the union are under the jurisdiction of Brahmanbaria Sadar Police Station. It also forms part of Brahmanbaria-3 Constituency of the Jatiya Sangsad.

== Administrative divisions ==
The union is divided into the following 18 villages:

Village	Population (2011)
Alakpur	782
Atla	2,957
Bhadeshwara	1,771
Bhat Para	830
Chapair	3,571
Chinaiar	5,427
Chandpur	3,643
Dakshin Jagatsar	3,808
Fulbaria	939
Gazaria	1,702
Kachait	5,051
Kanchanpur	1,359
Kazirkhola	556
Kheoai	1,662
Machhihata	1,122
Paghachang	1,960
Radhika	1,674
Uttar Jagatsar	1,695

== Education system ==
According to 2011 census, the literally rate of Machihata Union is 61.1%.

== See also ==
- Brahmanbaria Sadar Upazila
- Brahmanbaria District
- Union councils of Bangladesh
