= Kuti Atal Bihari High School =

- কুটি অটল বিহারী উচ্চ বিদ্যালয়

Location
- Kuti, Kasba Upazila, Brahmanbaria District; Bangladesh; 23.7398°N 91.0732°E

Information
- Established: 1918
- Founder: Sri Atal Bihari Datta
- School board: Comilla Education Board
- Faculty: 15
- Grades: Six-Ten
- Enrollment: 835
- Language: Bengali
- Campus type: Rural
- Website: kutiabhs.edu.bd

Kuti Atal Bihari High School (Bengali: কুটি অটল বিহারী উচ্চ বিদ্যালয়) is a secondary school in Kuti, Kasba Upazila, Brahmanbaria District, Bangladesh. It was founded in 1918.

The school opened a new three-storey building in 2017.

== See also ==
- Education in Bangladesh
- List of colleges and universities in Brahmanbaria District
- List of schools in Bangladesh
