= Liaquat Ali (Brahmanbaria politician) =

Bangladeshi politician

Member of Bangladesh Parliament
- In office 1986–1988
- Succeeded by: Mohammad Jahangir Osman

Personal details
- Party: Jatiya Party (Ershad)

Liaquat Ali is a Jatiya Party (Ershad) politician and a former member of parliament for Brahmanbaria-4.

== Career ==
Ali was elected to parliament from Brahmanbaria-4 as a Jatiya Party candidate in 1986 and 1988.
