= Chattagram International Medical College =

Medical college in Chittagong, Bangladesh

- চট্টগ্রাম ইন্টারন্যাশনাল মেডিকেল কলেজ
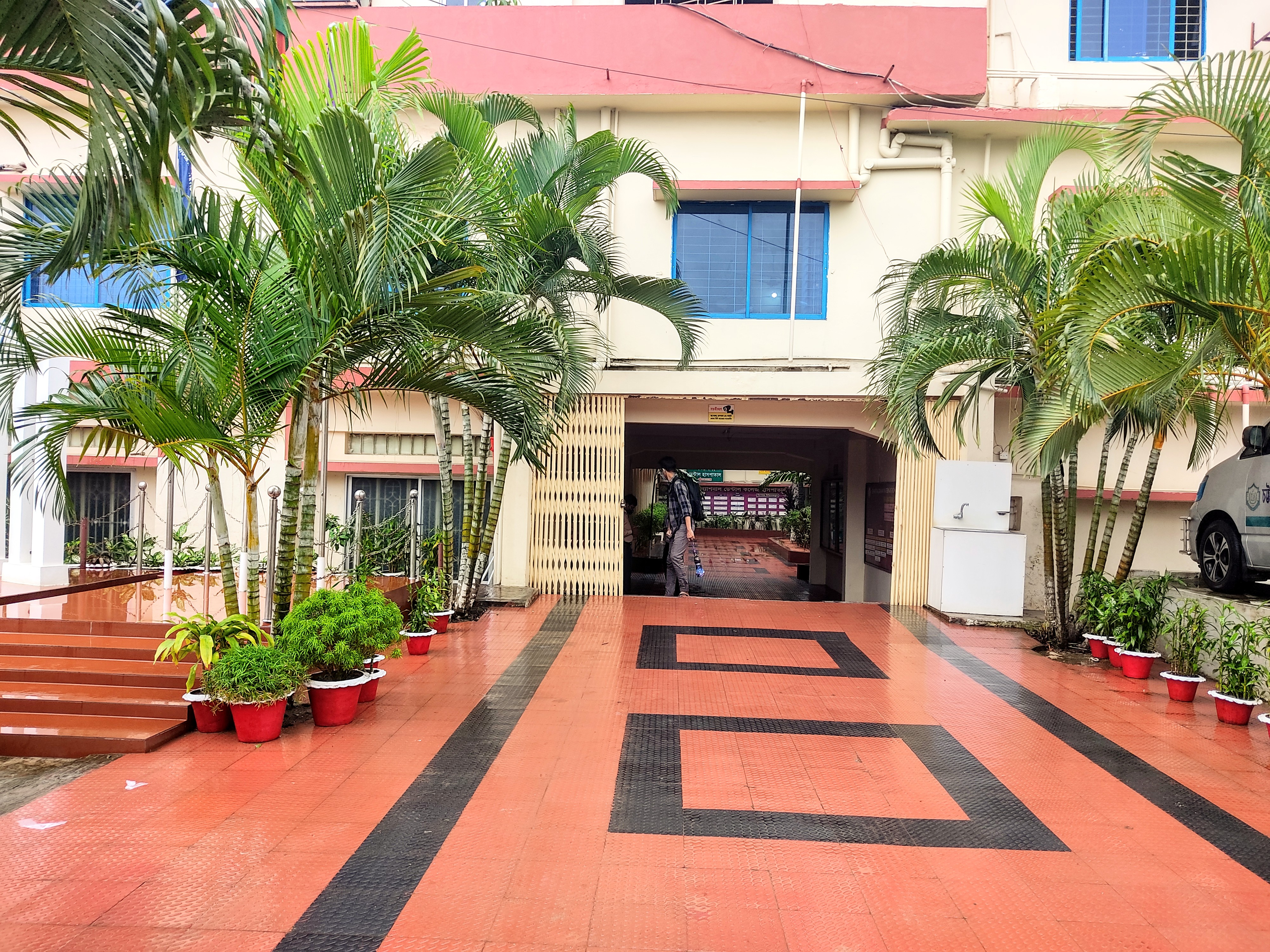
- Other name: CIMC
- Type: Private medical school
- Established: 2013; 13 years ago
- Academic affiliations: Chittagong Medical University
- Principal: Muslim Uddin
- Students: 300
- Location: Chittagong, Bangladesh
- Campus: Urban
- Language: English
- Website: https://cimch.edu.bd/

Chattagram International Medical College (CIMC) is a medical college located in Chandgaon, Chittagong, Bangladesh. It is affiliated with the Chittagong Medical University.

== History ==
Chattagram International Medical College was established in 2013 at 323/434, Haji Chand Mia Road, Shamser Para, Chandgaon, Chattagram Bangladesh.
