= Chittagong Nursing College =

Public nursing college in Chittagong, Bangladesh

Coordinates: 22.3594°N 91.8282°E

- Motto: "Service is religion"
- Type: Public
- Established: 2007; 19 years ago
- Affiliations: University of Chittagong; Chittagong Medical University
- Principal: Mosammat Aleya Begum
- Location: O R Nizam Road, Panchshaish, Chittagong, 4203, Bangladesh
- Website: cnc.dgnm.gov.bd

Chittagong Nursing College is a public nursing institution located in Chittagong, Bangladesh. It is located in Panchlaish area and is on the western side of Chittagong Medical College Hospital. The institute was established in 2007. Earlier it was the Nursing Department of Chittagong Medical College.

It is recognized by the Bangladesh Nursing and Midwifery Council, and offers a Bachelor of Science in Nursing and a Diploma in Midwifery course.

Sheikh Hasina, in her second term as prime minister, emphasized secularizing education. As a result, the college was one of several educational institutions to enforce a student dress code that banned the wearing of a hijab (headscarf) or niqab (face veil). In 2012, some students demonstrated against the restriction. Anjali Rani Debi, a teacher who spoke in favor of the ban, was murdered in January 2015, allegedly by an Islamic extremist.
