= Southern Medical College and Hospital =

Private Medical college in Chittagong, Bangladesh

- সাউদার্ন মেডিকেল কলেজ ও হাসপাতাল
- Type: Private medical school
- Established: 2005; 21 years ago
- Chairman: Md. Abdus Salam
- Principal: Prof. Dr. Joyabrata Das
- Academic staff: 194
- Students: 390
- Location: Chittagong, Bangladesh
- Campus: Urban
- Language: English
- Website: www.smchctgbd.com

Southern Medical College and Hospital, abbreviated as SMCH is a private medical college located in Chittagong, Bangladesh. It is affiliated with the Chittagong Medical University.

== History ==
Southern Medical College was established in 2005 at East Nasirabad, Khulshi, Polytechnic, Chattogram.

== Departments ==
1. Anatomy
2. Physiology
3. Biochemistry
4. Pharmacology and Therapeutics
5. Forensic medicine and Toxicology
6. Pathology
7. Microbiology
8. Community medicine and Public health
9. Medicine
10. Surgery
11. Obstetrics and gynaecology
12. Pediatrics
13. Dermatology
14. Ophthalmology
15. Otolaryngology
