= Champaknagar Union =

Champaknagar চম্পকনগর
- Union
- Interactive map of Champaknagar
- Coordinates: 23.9695°N 91.2127°E
- Country: Bangladesh
- Division: Chittagong Division
- District: Brahmanbaria District
- Upazila: Union

Population (2011)
  - Total: 16,388
- Time zone: UTC+6 (BST)

Champaknagar Union (Bengali: চম্পকনগর) is a union parishad of Bijoynagar Upazila.

== Administration ==
Champaknagar has 9 wards, 22 mouzas/mahallas.

Champaknagar School and College is the only higher secondary educational institution in the union.
