= Brahmanbaria Government College =

College in Brahmanbaria, Bangladesh

Brahmanbaria Government College, Brahmanbaria
- Established: 1948
- Academic staff: 89
- Students: 13,035
- Location: Brahmanbaria, Bangladesh; 23.9666°N 91.1125°E
- Colours: Red and white
- Website: bgc.edu.bd

Brahmanbaria Government College is an educational institute of Brahmanbaria. The college is near Brahmanbaria Railway Station. This college is affiliated to National University, Bangladesh.

== History ==
In 1939, British troops took Feni College. For some years Feni College was transferred from Feni to Brahmanbaria. At the end of WWII, the college returned to Feni. Brahmanbaria Government College was founded in 1948 using the infrastructure that Feni College left behind.

Brahmanbaria College was privately run until 1979 when it was nationalized. Initially, Higher Secondary and Bachelor Pass courses were introduced. Honours courses of Mathematics and Political Science started from the 1993–94 academic year. Gradually, 12 honours and master's subjects were introduced.

== Academic ==
- Bachelor (Honours) Course: 15 topics
- Postgraduate Courses: Political Science and Mathematics
- Master's Preliminary Course: Political Science

=== Faculty of Arts ===
- Bengali
- English
- Philosophy
- History
- Islamic Studies
- Islamic History and Culture

=== Faculty of Social Science ===
- Political Science
- Economics
- Sociology

=== Faculty of Science ===
- Physics
- Chemistry
- Mathematics
- Botany
- Zoology

=== Faculty of Business Administration ===
- Accounting
- Management.

== Infrastructure ==
- Eight academic buildings
- Administrative building
- Three hostels
- Mosque
- Teacher's auditorium
- Two student hostels
- Teachers' dormitory
