= Chandpur Medical College =

Government medical college in Chandpur, Bangladesh

Chandpur Medical College -ChMC
- চাঁদপুর মেডিকেল কলেজ
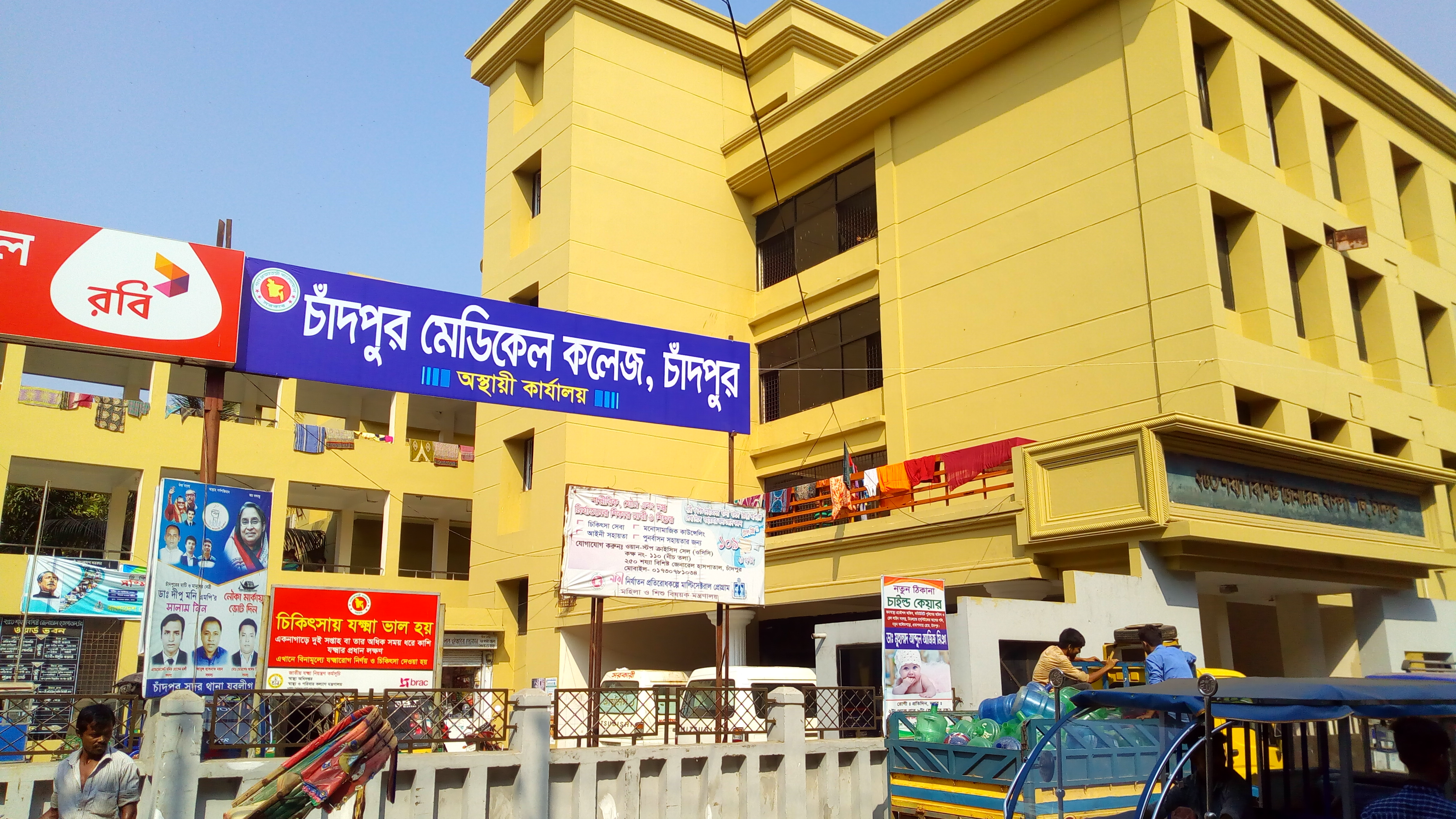
- Academic building and temporary office of Chandpur Medical College
- Other names: ChMC
- Type: Government Medical College
- Established: 2018
- Academic affiliations: Chittagong Medical University
- Principal: Shahela Nazneen, professor and departmental head, Obstetrics & Gynaecology, Chandpur Medical College
- Location: Stand Road, Kobi Nazrul Sarak, Chandpur, Bangladesh
- Campus: 32 acres (13 ha); Urban
- Language: English
- Website: chmc.college.gov.bd

Chandpur Medical College, also known as ChMC, is a government medical college in Chandpur District, Bangladesh, founded in 2018 and affiliated with Chittagong Medical University.

The academic activities of Chandpur Medical College officially started on January 10, 2019 with the admission of 50 students in the 1st batch from 2018-2019 MBBS academic year. According to the government order dated 19/11/2018 of Medical Education-1 Branch of Medical Education and Family Welfare Division, the academic and administrative activities of the college started as a temporary campus with 13 rooms on the 3rd floor of the north side of the 250-bedded Chandpur General Hospital.

Later, administrative permission was granted for the temporarily use the 250-bedded Chandpur General Hospital as Chandpur Medical College Hospital until its own Medical College Hospital was opened.

The college has government approval to admit 50 MBBS students in each academic year from 2018-19 to 2022-23 academic year and the number of seats has been increased to 75 from 2023-2024 academic year. Currently 284 MBBS students are studying in this college till the academic year 2023–2024. Till now 38 students of 2018–19 academic year have completed their MBBS graduation and started internship under 250 bedded General Hospital Chandpur. Vacant units of residential quarter of Chandpur General Hospital with 250 beds for female students and rented house for male students are being used as hostels. Renting another academic building (8000 sqft) has been approved recently by Ministry of Health & Family Welfare and academic activities of basic science will be shifted there very soon. Beside this, the process of renting a new student hostel and intern hostel is going on. A DPP entitled "Chandpur Medical College Hospital and Nursing College" project has been approved by ECNEC recently for setting up a permanent campus of the college near Chandpur city.
