= Kharampur Mazar Sharif =

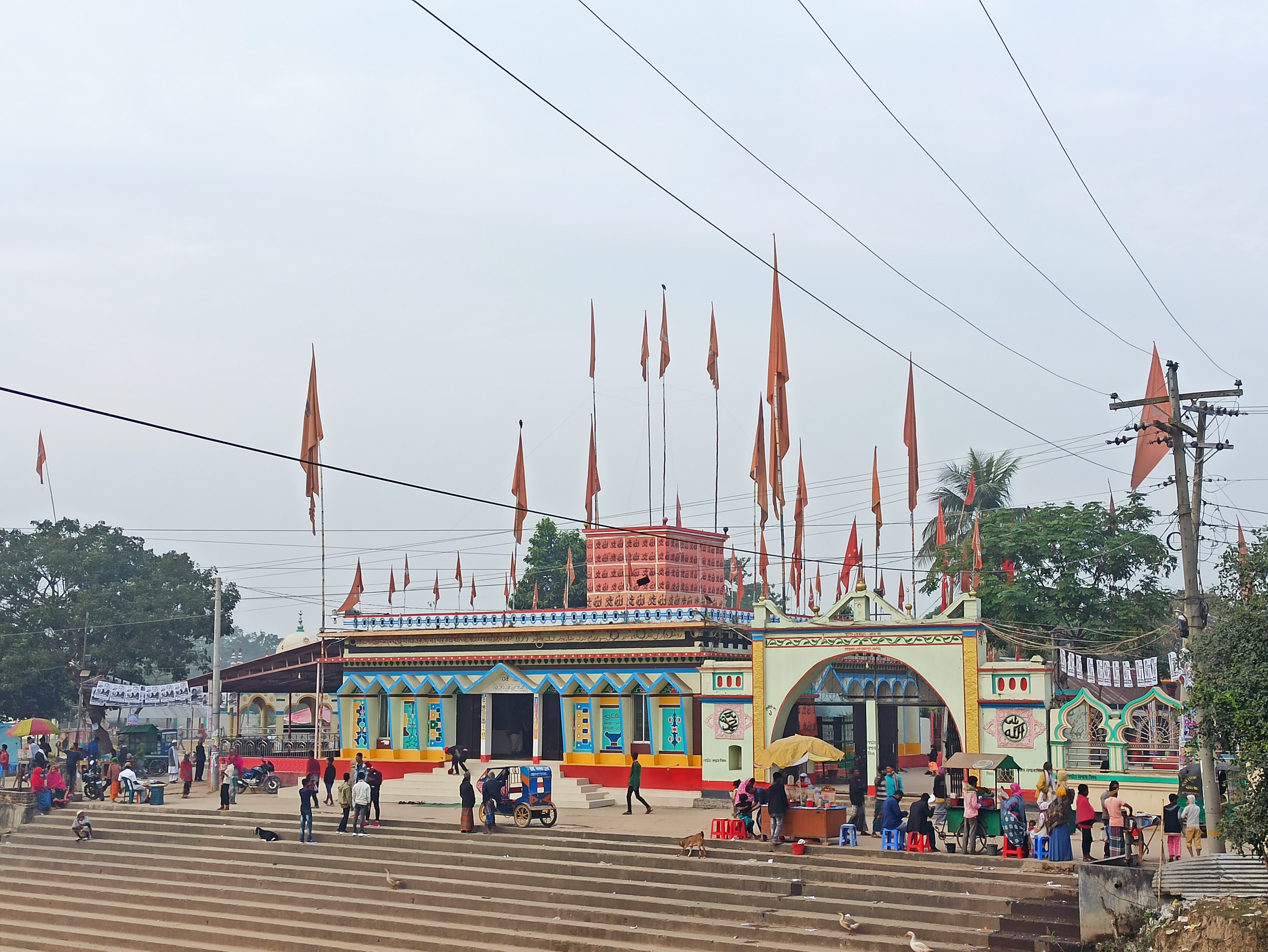

Location
- Location: Kharampur, Akhaura Upazila, Brahmanbaria District, Bangladesh
- Interactive map of Kharampur Mazar Sharif
- Coordinates: 23.8835°N 91.2081°E

Kharampur Mazar Sharif is a mazar (mausoleum) in the village of Kharampur, Akhaura Upazila, Brahmanbaria District, Bangladesh. It is built on the burial ground of Syed Ahmad Gesudaraz. The structure stands on 260 acres (110 ha) of land.

== Festivals ==
A village fair is held every year in Kharampur Mazar Sharif during the Urs period.
