= Bangladesh Railway Government High School, Brahmanbaria =

Bangladesh Railway Governmental High School

Location
- Akhaura, Brahmanbaria. 3400; Bangladesh
- Coordinates: 23.8767°N 91.2076°E

Information
- Type: Public
- Established: 1920
- School board: Comilla
- Headmaster: Asaduzzaman Khan
- Staff: 30
- Grades: 1 to 10 (SSC)
- Enrolment: 2,000

Bangladesh Railway Government High School, founded in 1920, is one of the oldest secondary schools in Brahmanbaria District, Bangladesh. It offers first to tenth grades.

== Campus ==
The school is located along the Azampur-Chandura regional road, south of Akhaura City Bypass Rd and 50 metres (160 ft) north of the municipal garbage dump. Classes are sometimes cancelled because of the smell. The campus is east of the Tongi–Bhairab–Akhaura line, west of the Akhaura–Kulaura–Chhatak line, and north of Akhaura Junction railway station.
