= Marine City Medical College =

Medical college in Chittagong, Bangladesh

- মেরিন সিটি মেডিকেল কলেজ
- Other name: MCMC
- Type: Private medical school
- Established: 2013; 13 years ago
- Academic affiliations: Chittagong Medical University
- Principal: Prof. Dr. Sujat Paul
- Students: 390
- Location: Chittagong, Bangladesh
- Campus: Urban
- Language: English
- Website: link

Marine City Medical College , abbreviated as MCMC is a medical college located in Bayazid Bostami, Chittagong, Bangladesh.It is affiliated with the Chittagong Medical University.

== History ==
Marine City Medical Medical was established in 2013 at Chandra Nagar, East Nasirabad, Bayazid Bostami, Chattogram.
