= Mushfiqur Rahman (politician) =

Bangladeshi politician

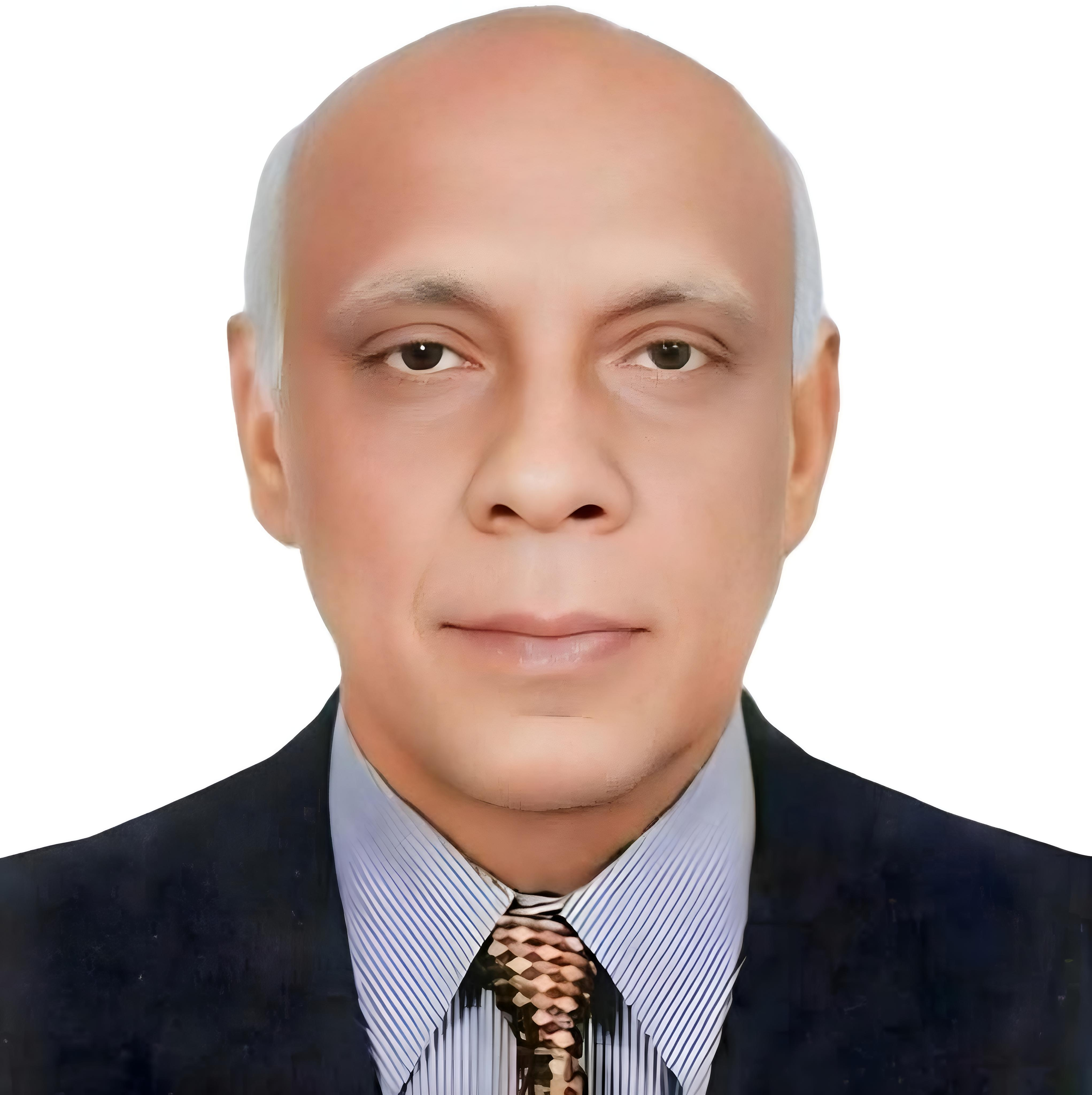

Member of Jatiya Sangsad
- Incumbent
- Assumed office 17 February 2026
- Preceded by: Anisul Huq
- Constituency: Brahmanbaria-4
- In office 1 October 2001 – 29 October 2006
- Preceded by: Mohammad Shah Alam
- Succeeded by: Mohammad Shah Alam
- Constituency: Brahmanbaria-4

Personal details
- Party: Bangladesh Nationalist Party

Mushfiqur Rahman is a Bangladesh Nationalist Party politician and a current member of parliament for Brahmanbaria-4.

== Career ==
Mushfiq Ur Rahman was elected to parliament from Brahmanbaria-4 as a Bangladesh Nationalist Party (BNP) candidate in 2001. He was nominated for the 11th Jatiya Sansad election but his nomination was cancelled by the Bangladesh Election Commission.

He was elected once again as Member of Parliament in 2026
