= Brahmanbaria Medical College =

- ব্রাহ্মণবাড়িয়া মেডিকেল কলেজ
- Type: Private
- Established: 2014
- Academic affiliations: Chittagong Medical University
- Chairman: Md. Abu Sayed
- Principal: Zakiur Rahman
- Students: 400+ (2024)
- Undergraduates: MBBS
- Location: Brahmanbaria, Chittagong, Bangladesh; 24.0019°N 91.1106°E
- Campus: Urban
- Language: English
- Website: bmchbd.com

Brahmanbaria Medical College (BMC) (Bengali: ব্রাহ্মণবাড়িয়া মেডিকেল কলেজ) is a private medical college which began educating students in 2013. The college is located in Ghatura, Brahmanbaria Sadar Upazila, Brahmanbaria, Bangladesh, and is affiliated with Chittagong Medical University as a constituent college.

The college offers a five-year course of study leading to a Bachelor of Medicine, Bachelor of Surgery (MBBS) degree, and a one-year internship after obtaining the latter. The degree is recognized by the Bangladesh Medical and Dental Council.

== History ==
Brahmanbaria Medical College was established in 2010 and its first class of students matriculated in the 2013–14 academic year when the school was granted affiliation with the University of Chittagong. 50 Students get chance to enrol in this medical college every year.

== Campus ==
The college is located in Ghatura, Brahmanbaria, 4 km away from town. There is a strict no-smoking policy on college property. The hospital is equipped with an ambulance service and a hemodialysis unit which operates at all hours of the day. It has been affiliated with a 400 bedded modern hospital known as Brahmanbaria Medical College Hospital. Brahmanbaria United Nursing College & United Care Institute of Medical Technology are also owned by the same owner.

== Organization and administration ==
The college is affiliated with Chittagong University. The chairman of the college is Md. Abu Sayed. The principal is Md. Aminur Rahman.

== Academics and admissions ==
Admission for Bangladeshis to the MBBS programme at all medical colleges in Bangladesh (government and private) is conducted centrally by the Directorate General of Health Services. It administers a written multiple choice question exam simultaneously throughout the country. Candidates are admitted based primarily on their score on this test, although grades at Secondary School Certificate and Higher Secondary School Certificate level also play a part. Seats are reserved, according to quotas set by the directorate, for children of freedom fighters and for students from underprivileged backgrounds.

== See also ==
- List of medical colleges in Bangladesh
