= Cox's Bazar Medical College =

Government medical school in Bangladesh

- কক্সবাজার মেডিকেল কলেজ
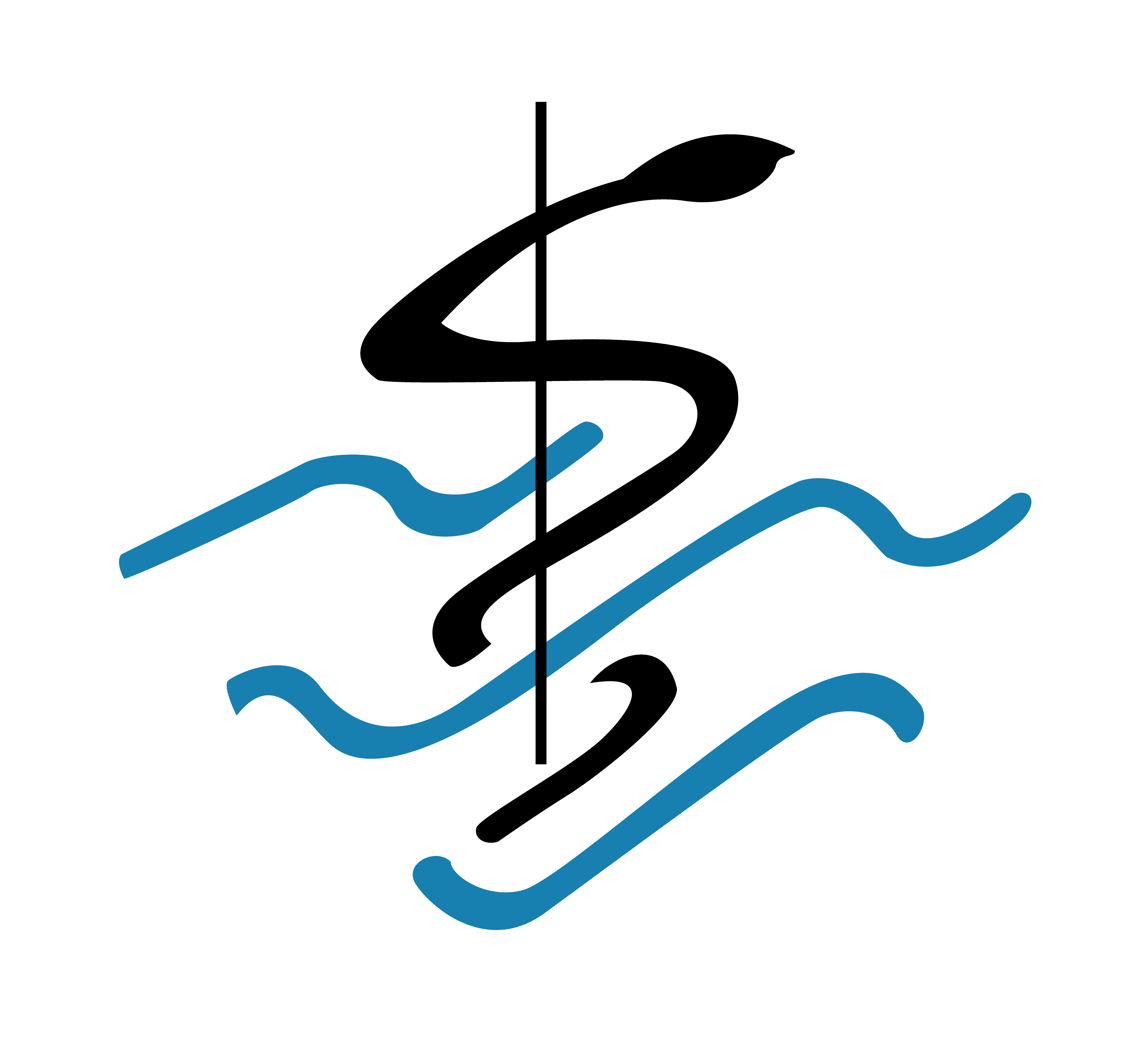
- Symbol of Cox's Bazar Medical College
- Other name: CoxMC (Bengali: কমেক)
- Type: Public medical school
- Established: 2008; 18 years ago
- Academic affiliations: Chittagong University (From MBBS Session 2008–09 to 2016–17), Chittagong Medical University (From MBBS Session 2017–18 to present)
- Principal: Sohel Baksh
- Academic staff: 76
- Students: 300
- Location: Cox's Bazar, Bangladesh; 21.4206°N 92.0149°E
- Campus: Urban
- Language: English
- Website: coxmc.edu.bd
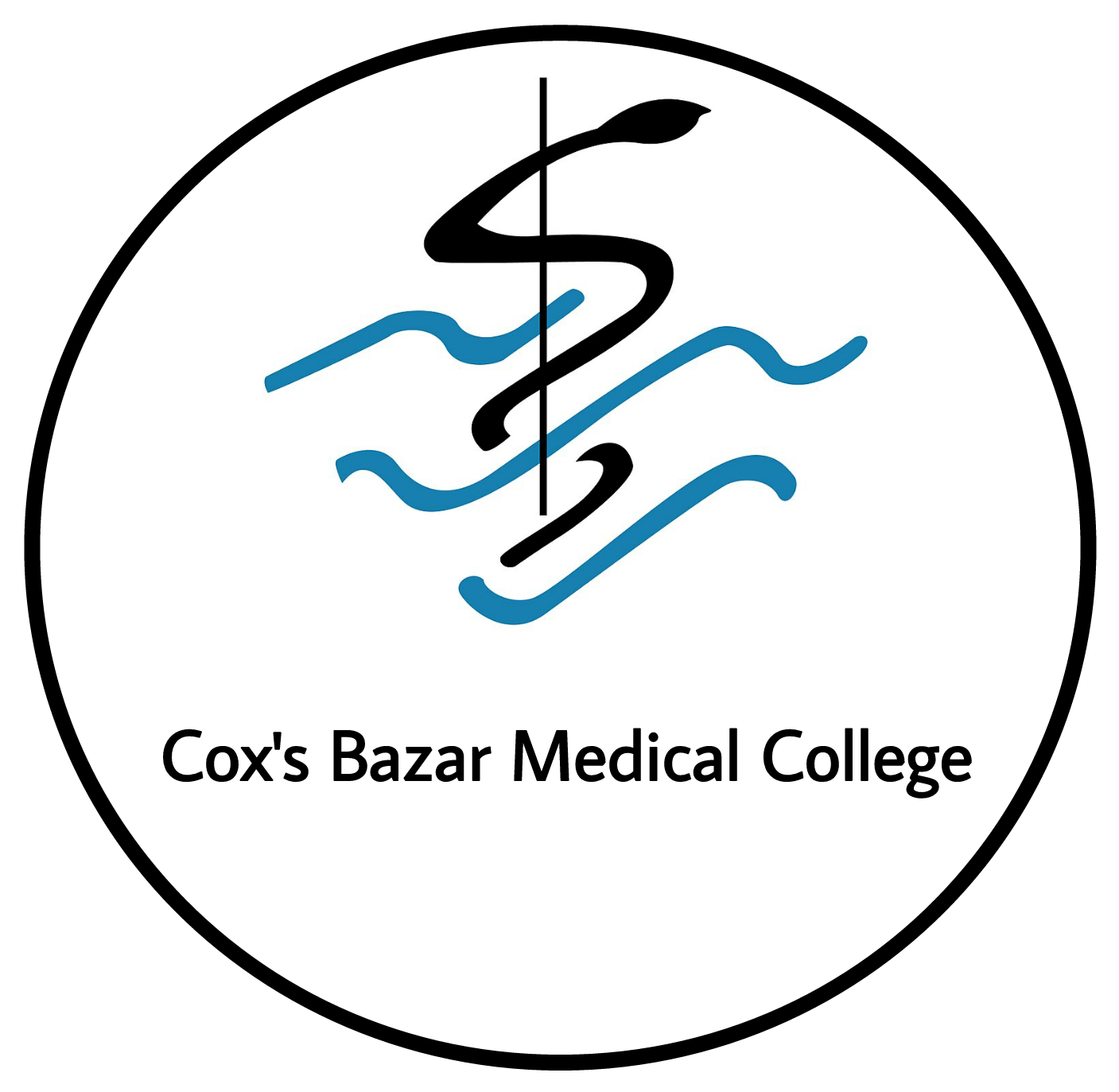

Cox's Bazar Medical College (Bengali: কক্সবাজার মেডিকেল কলেজ) is a government medical school in Cox's Bazar, Bangladesh established in 2008.

There are two separate hostels for male and female students with all sorts of facilities. The students can perform all sorts of their professional competence at 250 bedded Cox's Bazar District Sadar Hospital, the temporary facility for Medical College Hospital. It has all the major branches of medical education.

It is a World Directory of Medical Schools (WDOM) enlisted Medical School.

== History ==
In the academic year 1978–1979, the Bangladesh government planned to establish medical colleges at Bogra, Comilla, Dinajpur, Faridpur, Kushtia, Khulna, Noakhali and Pabna with a view to improve the healthcare services in the country. Subsequently, the programme was abandoned. Than the government felt the need for more medical colleges for medical education facilities. Accordingly, the government committed to establish five new medical colleges at Pabna, Jessore, Noakhali, Cox's Bazar and Rangamati with annual intakes of 50 students at each. The college was established in 2008. In 2008, it started educational service in a part of general hospital.

== Campus ==
Cox's Bazar Medical College moved to the permanent campus with its own academic buildings and hostels for students in 2017. There is a mosque and Shaheed Minar.

The whole campus is secured under 24 hours CCTV surveillance.

It has a 250-bed hospital where the students do their internship after completing the 5-year MBBS course. The work for hospital building will be started soon.

== Administration ==
Currently there are 76 teachers working in different departments. Sohel Baksh is the current principal.

Cox's Bazar Medical College is affiliated under Chittagong Medical University. The students receive MBBS degree from Chittagong University after completion of their fifth year and passing the final Professional MBBS examination. The Professional examinations are held under the university and results are given thereby. Internal examinations are also taken on regular interval namely Card completions, term end and regular assessments.

From the MBBS Session 2017–18, Affiliation of Cox's Bazar Medical College has been changed to the newly established Chittagong Medical University.

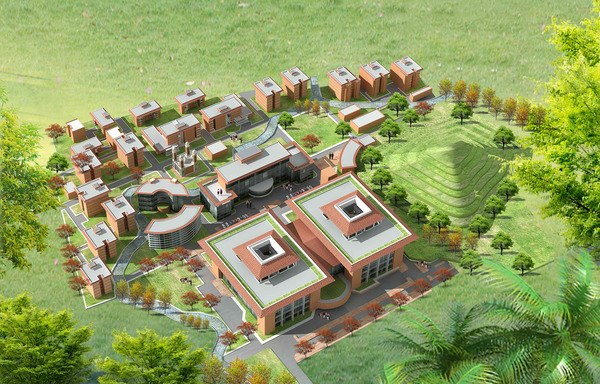
Design of main campus

== Departments ==
- Anatomy
- Physiology
- Biochemistry
- Forensic Medicine
- Community Medicine
- Pharmacology
- Pathology
- Microbiology
- Surgery
- Medicine
- Gynae & Obstetrics
- Paediatrics
- Paediatric Surgery
- Ophthalmology
- ENT
- Anesthesiology
- Cardiology
- Orthopaedics
- Dermatology
- Radiology & Imaging
- Transfusion Medicine

== Medical College Hospital ==
Cox's Bazar Medical College Hospital have total 500 seats. It will be implemented soon in permanent campus.

== Admission ==
Cox's Bazar Medical College admits 70 students into the MBBS programme yearly under the government medical admission test. Admission of Cox's Bazar Medical College is administrated by Directorate General of Health Services (DGHS) under the Ministry of Health, Government of Bangladesh and curriculum by Bangladesh Medical and Dental Council.

Basic requirement for admission is that a candidate must have passed Secondary School Certificate (SSC)/'O' Level and Higher School Certificate (HSC)/'A' Level or their equivalent examinations although the minimum grade points required vary from year to year. It is also required that a candidate must have Biology, Chemistry and Physics among the subjects taken in HSC.

The admission test is conducted centrally by Director of Medical Education under DGHS. The test comprises a written MCQ exam, which is held simultaneously in all government medical colleges on the same day throughout the country. Candidates are selected for admission based on national merit and district, whether they are sons or daughters of freedom fighters, and to fill tribal quotas.

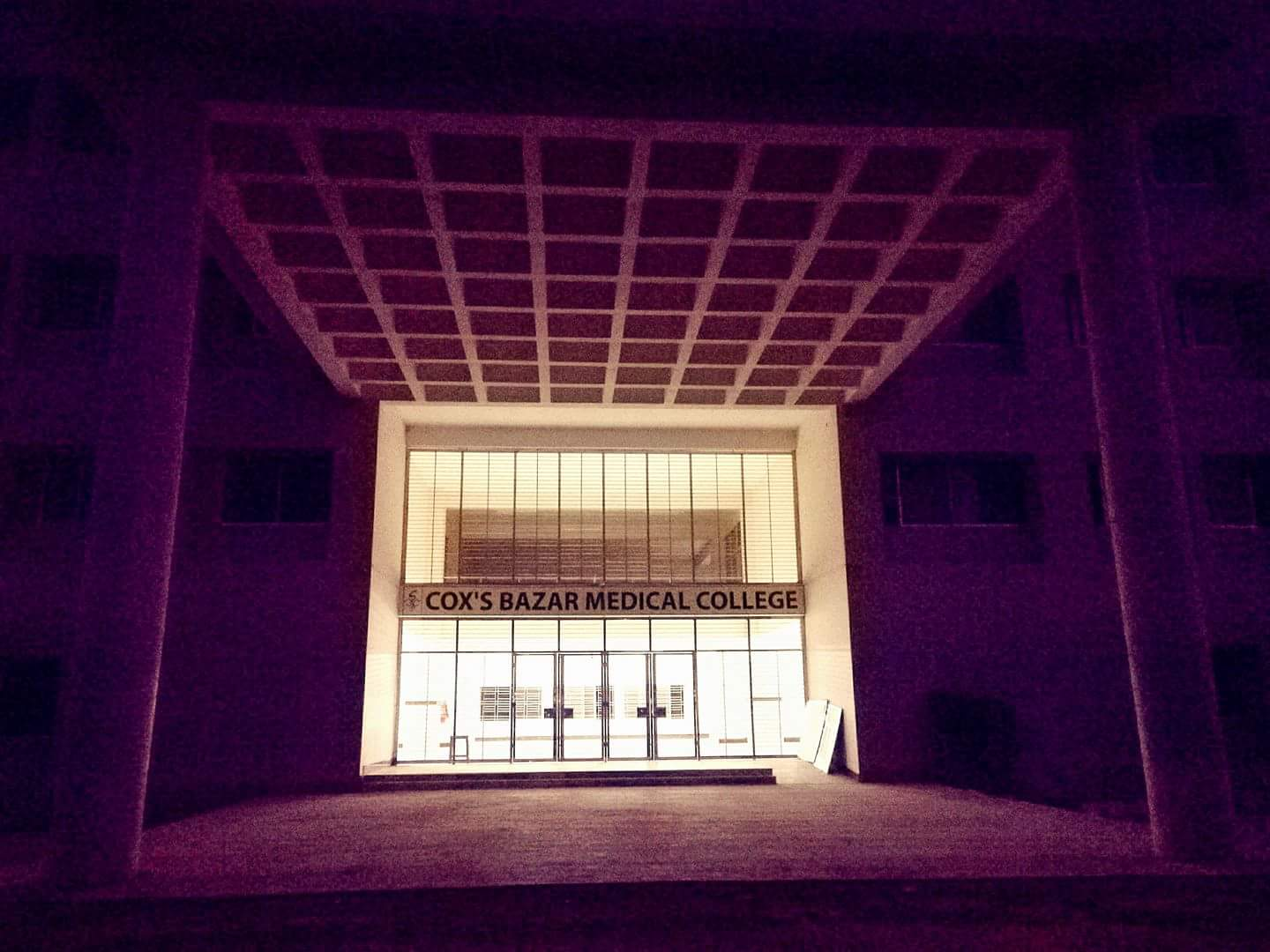
Entrance of the Academic building

== Voluntary organisations ==
The students of this college are also involved in many extracurricular and social welfare activities. There are two voluntary organisations:

- Sandhani, Cox's Bazar Medical College Unit
- Medicine Club, Cox's Bazar Medical College Unit

They provide humanitarian works like free blood grouping, blood transfusion, Voluntary blood donations & vaccination campaigns, relief works, health awareness & free health check-up campaigns in the urban and rural areas etc. These two organisations were pioneered by the founder principal B. M. Ali Yusuf and the then vice principal Arup Dutta Bappi.

== See also ==
- List of medical colleges in Bangladesh
- Health in Bangladesh
