= Chittagong Medical University =

Public medical research university in Chittagong District of Bangladesh

- চট্টগ্রাম মেডিকেল বিশ্ববিদ্যালয়
- Type: Public, Research
- Established: 2016; 10 years ago
- Affiliations: University Grants Commission
- Chancellor: President Mirza Fakhrul Islam Alamgir
- Vice-Chancellor: Muhammad Omar Faruque Yusuf
- Location: Fauzdarhat Bokkhobaydi Hospital, Chittagong, Bangladesh; 22.3926°N 91.7583°E
- Campus: Urban
- Website: cmu.edu.bd

Chittagong Medical University (CMU) is a public medical university, situated in Faujdarhat, Chittagong District, Bangladesh. It was established in 2016.

== Affiliated colleges ==
=== Medical colleges ===
Public

- Chittagong Medical College
- Cumilla Medical College
- Noakhali Medical College
- Cox's Bazar Medical College
- Rangamati Medical College
- Chandpur Medical College

Private

- Chattogram Maa-O-Shishu Hospital Medical College
- Southern Medical College and Hospital
- Institute of Applied Health Sciences
- BGC Trust Medical College, Chittagong
- Marine City Medical College, Chittagong
- Chattagram International Medical College
- Central Medical College, Comilla
- Eastern Medical College, Comilla
- Mainamoti Medical College, Comilla
- Brahmanbaria Medical College

=== Dental colleges ===
Public

- Chittagong Medical College (Dental Unit)

Private

- Chittagong International Dental College
- Chattogram Maa-O-Shishu Hospital Medical College (Dental Unit)

=== Nursing colleges ===
Public

- Chittagong Nursing College
- Faujdarhat Nursing College
- Bandarban Nursing College

Private

- Shamsun Nahar Khan Nursing College, Chittagong
- Holly Nursing College, Chittagong
- Anwara Noor Nursing College, Chittagong
- Chittagong International Nursing College, Chittagong
- Pragati Nursing College, Chittagong
- South Asian Applied Nursing College, Chittagong
- Chittagong Imperial College of Nursing, Chittagong
- Marine City Nursing College, Chittagong
- Nobel Nursing College, Chittagong
- Creative Nursing College, Chittagong
- Art Nursing College, Cumilla
- Laksam Model Nursing College, Cumilla
- Victoria College of Nursing, Cumilla
- Prime Model Nursing College, Noakhali
- Lake City College of Nursing and Midwifery, Rangamati
- United Nursing College, Brahmanbaria
- Queen's College of Nursing, Feni
- Ideal Nursing College, Chandpur

== Faculties ==
- Faculty of Medicine, Dean: Shahena Akter
- Faculty of Nursing & IHT (Institute of Health Technology), Dean: Mohammed Monowar-Ul-Haque

== List of vice-chancellors ==
- Ismail Khan
- Muhammad Omar Faruque Yusuf
