= Mohammad Shah Alam =

Bangladeshi politician

Former Member of Parliament Brahmanbaria-4 (Kasba-Akhaura)
- In office 2008–2014
- Succeeded by: Anisul Huq

Personal details
- Born: 20 April 1961 (age 64)
- Party: Bangladesh Awami League

Mohammad Shah Alam (born 20 April 1961) is a politician, lawyer, businessman, and the former Member of Parliament from Brahmanbaria-4 (Kasba-Akhaura).

== Career ==
Shah Alam was elected to parliament from Brahmanbaria-4 (Kasba-Akhaura) as a Bangladesh Awami League candidate in 1996, 2001 and 2008. He served as the Vice-President of Brahmanbaria district unit of Bangladesh Awami League. He is former chairman of Standing Committee on Ministry of Hill Tracts and member of Standing Committee on Ministry of Railway (since 2008–2014).
