= Serajul Huq (politician) =

Bangladeshi politician

- সিরাজুল হক
- Born: 1925
- Died: 28 October 2002 (aged 76–77)
- Other name: Bachchu Mia
- Political party: Bangladesh Awami League
- Children: Anisul Huq (son)

Serajul Huq (1925 - 28 October 2002) was a Bangladeshi lawyer and former member of parliament in Bangladesh.

== Career ==
Serajul Huq was a founding member of the Awami Muslim League and was a close associate and confidant of Sheikh Mujibur Rahman. He was an organiser of the Bangladesh Liberation war in 1971 and was one of the first persons to cross over to India to seek assistance from the Indian Government against the genocide committed by the Pakistani Army. He was a lawyer of the Supreme Court of Bangladesh and in 1973 was appointed the chief prosecutor for the crimes perpetrated during the 1971 war. Subsequently in 1996, he was appointed the chief prosecutor in the Sheikh Mujibur Rahman murder case and in the jail killing case where four leaders of the country was killed in the Dhaka Central Jail in 1975.

== Family ==
Serajul Huq's was born to Nurul Huda, a police officer and Jaheda Khan, daughter of Yunus Ali Khan and sister of writer and novelist Farid Uddin Khan. His son Anisul Huq is a supreme court lawyer and was a member of parliament and served as the minister for law, justice and parliamentary affairs of the government of Bangladesh.
