= Mohammad Jahangir Osman =

Bangladeshi politician

Member of Bangladesh Parliament
- In office 1988–1990

Personal details
- Party: Jatiya Party (Ershad)

Mohammad Jahangir Osman (Bengali: মোহাম্মদ জাহাঙ্গীর ওসমান) is a Jatiya Party (Ershad) politician in Bangladesh and a former member of parliament for Brahmanbaria-4.

== Career ==
Osman was elected to parliament from Brahmanbaria-4 as a Jatiya Party candidate in 1988.
