= Akhaura Upazila =

Akhaura আখাউড়া
- Upazila
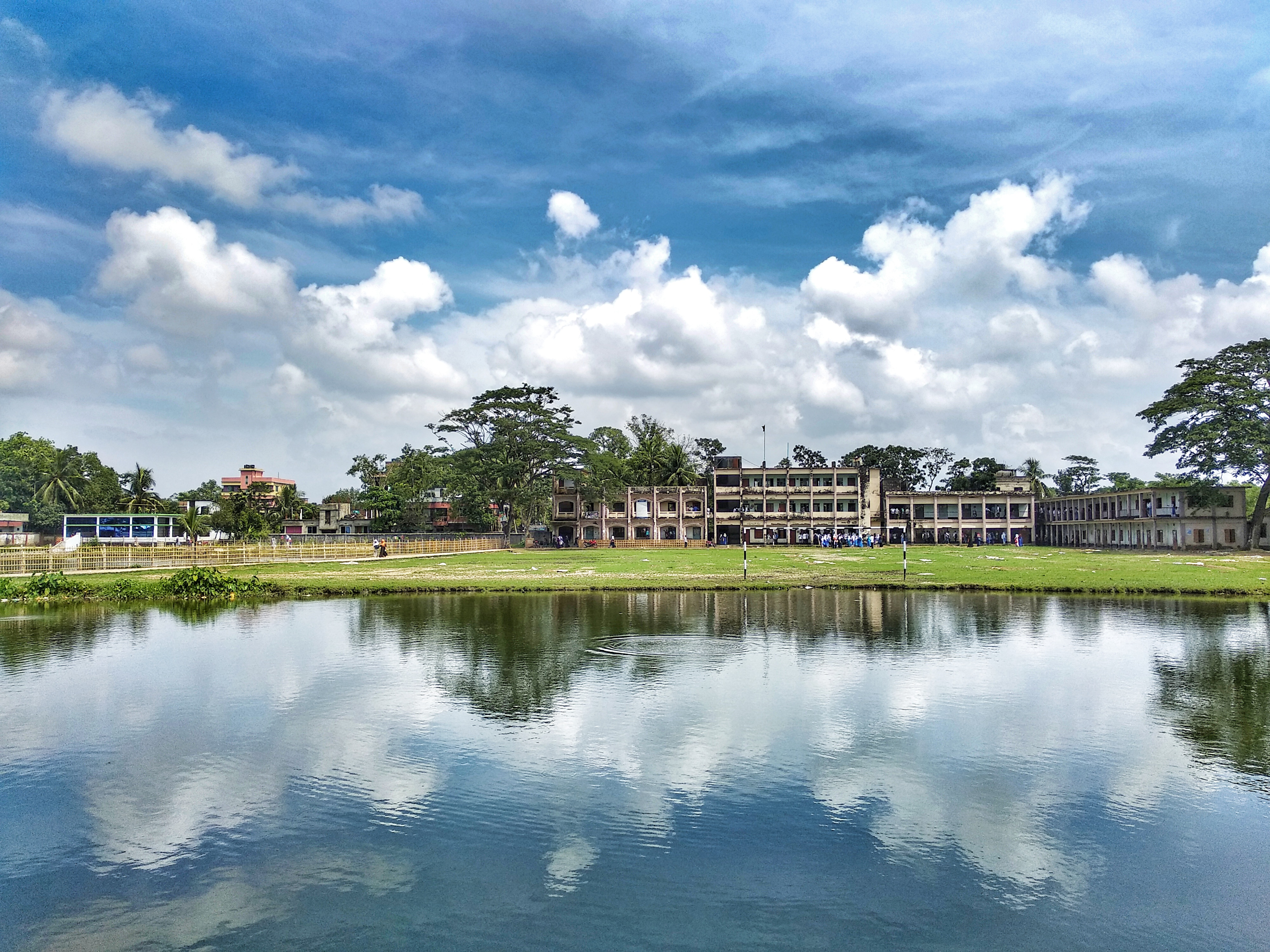
- Shaheed Shriti Degree College, Akhaura

- Coordinates: 23°52′05″N 91°12′30″E
- Country: Bangladesh
- Division: Chittagong
- District: Brahmanbaria

Government
  - Upazila Chairman: Monir Hossain

Area
  - Upazila: 98.04 km^{2} (37.85 sq mi)
  - Urban: 8.22 km^{2} (3.17 sq mi)

Population (2022)
  - Upazila: 168,472
  - Density: 1,718/km^{2} (4,451/sq mi)
  - Urban: 36,262
- Time zone: UTC+6 (BST)
- Postal code: 3450
- Area code: 08522
- Website: akhaura.brahmanbaria.gov.bd

Akhaura Upazila mauza geocode map

Akhaura (Bengali: আখাউড়া) is an upazila of Brahmanbaria District, a district under Chattogram, Bangladesh. Akhaura Upazila has an area of 99.28 km^{2}. The main river that runs through this upazila is the Titas River. Akhaura played an important historical role during both World War II and the Liberation War of Bangladesh.

The administration of Akhaura thana, now an upazila, was established in 1976. The upazila includes one municipality, five union parishads, 102 mouzas and 112 villages.

== History ==
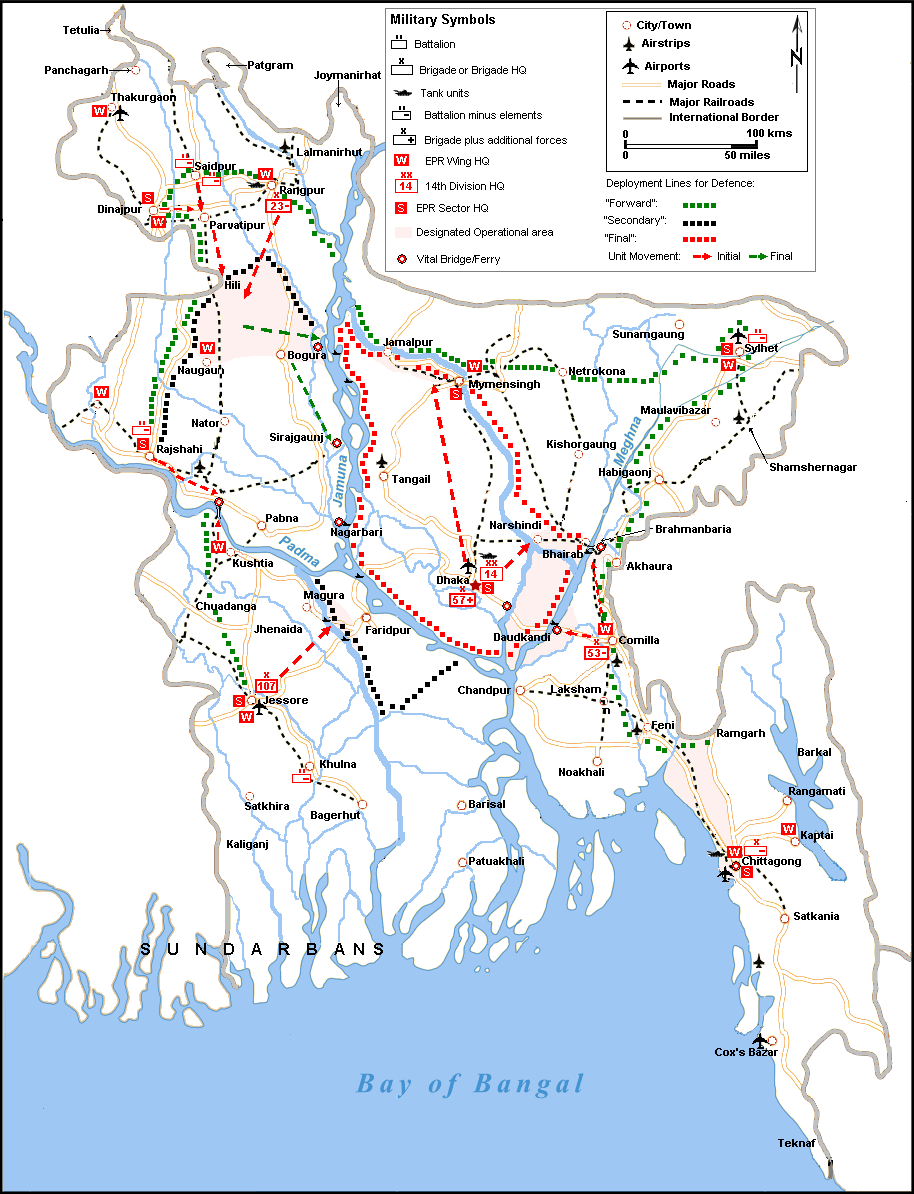
Pakistani Eastern Command plan for the defence of East Pakistan from 1967 to 1971 (generic representation—some unit locations not shown).

During the Indo-Pakistani War of 1971 for the liberation of Bangladesh, Pakistan Army planners predicted India would launch its main attack in the east along the Akhaura–Brahmanbaria axis; however, the army had no troops in this area, so the 27th brigade at Mymensingh was moved to Akhaura, except for two battalions (which became the 93rd brigade) that were retained for the defence of Mymensingh. Pakistan Army's 93,000 troops unconditionally surrendered to the Indian Army and India's local ally Mukti Bahini on 16 December 1971. This day and event is commemorated as the Bijoy Dibos (Bengali: বিজয় দিবস) in Bangladesh and Vijay Diwas in India.

== Demographics ==
Religions in Akhaura Upazila (2022)
| Religion | Percent |
| Islam | 94.60% |
| Hinduism | 5.38% |
| Other or not stated | 0.02% |

According to the 2022 Bangladeshi census, Akhaura Upazila had 37,210 households and a population of 168,472. 11.21% of the population were under 5 years of age. Akhaura had a literacy rate (age 7 and over) of 76.58%: 76.28% for males and 76.82% for females, and a sex ratio of 86.67 males for every 100 females. 50,396 (29.91%) lived in urban areas.

According to the 2011 Census of Bangladesh, Akhaura Upazila had 27,831 households and a population of 145,215. 39,836 (27.43%) were under 10 years of age. Akhaura had a literacy rate (age 7 and over) of 52.75%, compared to the national average of 51.8%, and a sex ratio of 1071 females per 1000 males. 36,262 (24.97%) lived in urban areas.

== Points of interest ==
- Kharampur Mazar Sharif, the mausoleum of Hazrat Syed Ahmad Gesudaraz, is a pilgrimage site for devotees.

== Administration ==
Akhaura Upazila is divided into Akhaura Municipality and five union parishads: South Akhaura, Dharkhar, Monionda, Mogra, and North Akhaura. The union parishads are subdivided into 102 mouzas and 112 villages.

Akhaura Municipality is subdivided into 9 wards and 23 mahallas.

== Transport ==
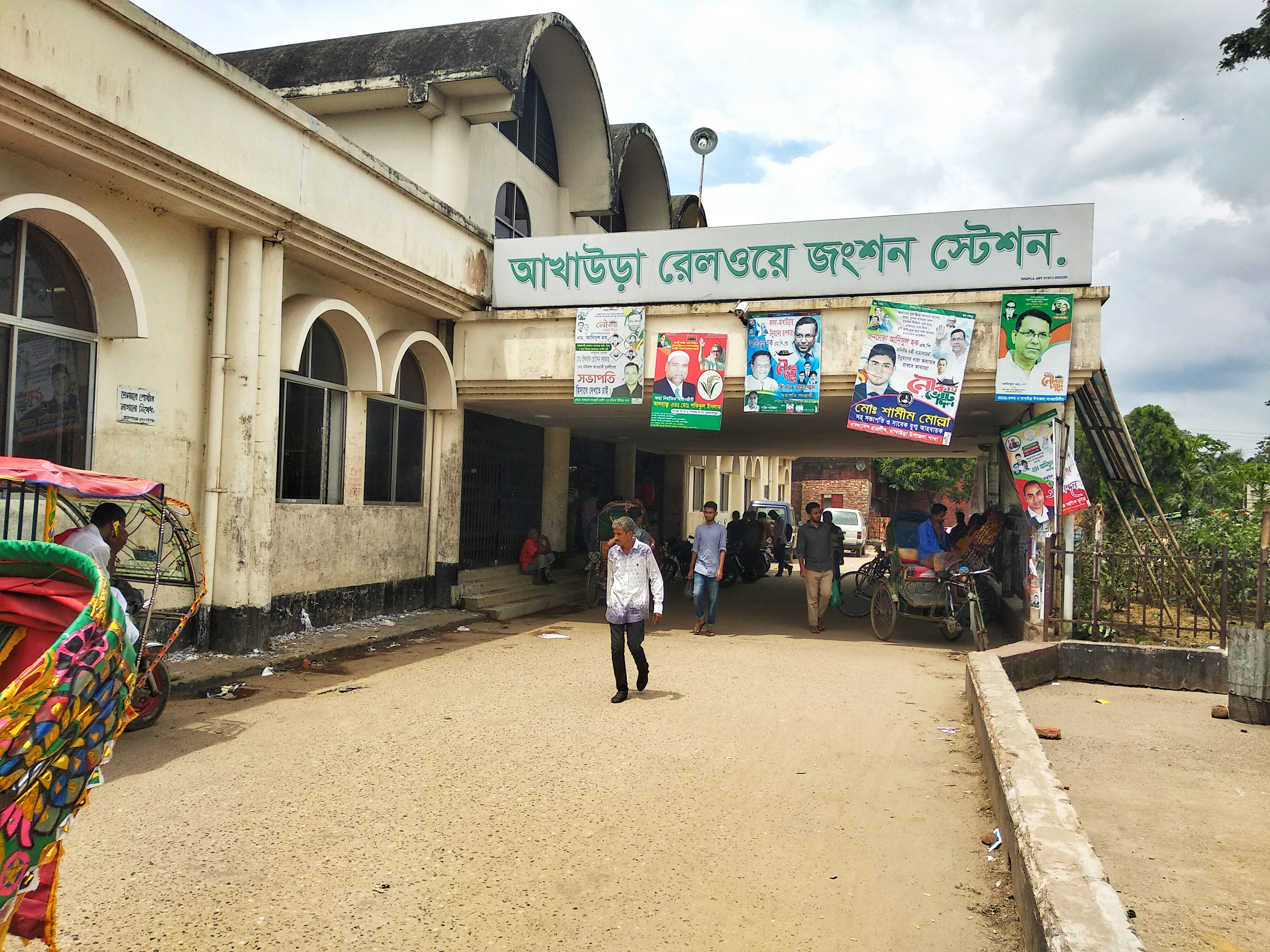
Akhaura Railway Station.

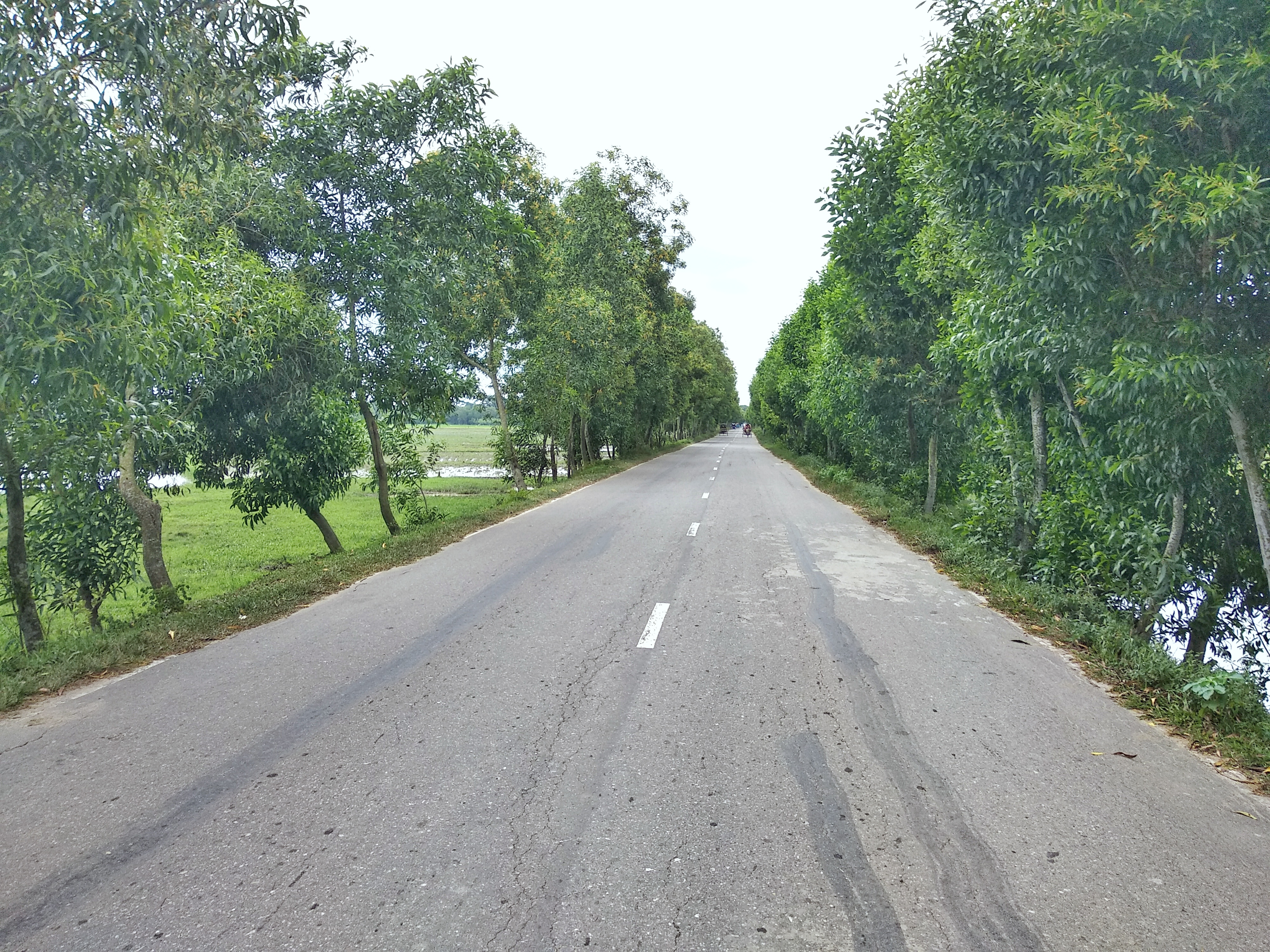
Akhaura Checkpost Road

Plans are underway to have Akhaura connected to Agartala, India via railway by 2017.

In 2013–14, Bangladesh exported TK 2.26 billion through the Akhaura Land Port to India.

== Education ==
There are several schools and colleges in Akhaura. As in 2016, there is no university in Akhaura upazila. According to Banglapedia, Bangladesh Railway Government High School, founded in 1920, is a notable secondary school.

== Notable people ==
- Syed Emdadul Bari, lawyer and politician, was born at Ranikhar in 1935.

== See also ==
- Upazilas of Bangladesh
- Districts of Bangladesh
- Divisions of Bangladesh
