= Bancharampur Upazila =

Bancharampur বাঞ্ছারামপুর
- Upazila
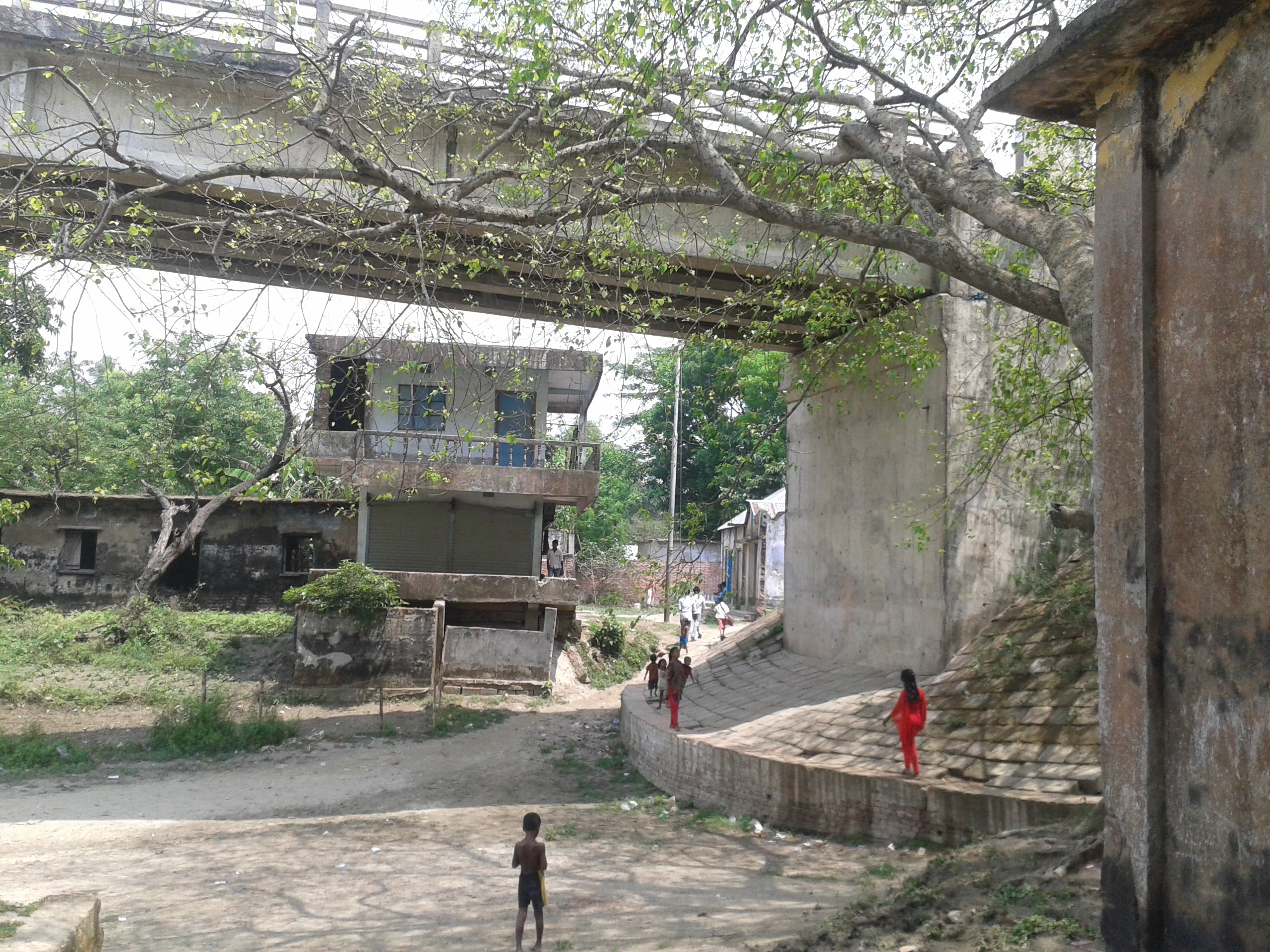
- View of Purbohati

- Coordinates: 23°46.7′N 90°48.5′E
- Country: Bangladesh
- Division: Chittagong
- District: Brahmanbaria

Area
  - Total: 217.38 km^{2} (83.93 sq mi)

Population (2022)
  - Total: 335,118
  - Density: 1,541.6/km^{2} (3,992.8/sq mi)
- Time zone: UTC+6 (BST)
- Postal code: 3420
- Area code: 08523

Bancharampur (Bengali: বাঞ্ছারামপুর) is an upazila (administrative region similar to a county) in the Brahmanbaria District in the Division of Chittagong, Bangladesh.

== Geography ==
Bancharampur is located at 23.7778°N 90.8084°E. It covers an area of 219.38 square kilometres (84.70 sq mi).

== Demographics ==
Religions in Bancharampur Upazila (2022)
Religion	Percent
Islam	95.57%
Hinduism	4.41%
Other or not stated	0.02%

According to the 2022 Bangladeshi census, Banchharampur Upazila had 78,255 households and a population of 335,118. 10.32% of the population were under 5 years of age. Banchharampur had a literacy rate (age 7 and over) of 68.55%: 70.06% for males and 67.37% for females, and a sex ratio of 81.63 males for every 100 females. 37,001 (11.04%) lived in urban areas.

According to the 2011 Census of Bangladesh, Bancharampur Upazila had 59,699 households and a population of 298,430. 82,530 (27.65%) were under 10 years of age. Bancharampur had a literacy rate (age 7 and over) of 38.53%, compared to the national average of 51.8%, and a sex ratio of 1145 females per 1000 males. 18,621 (6.24%) lived in urban areas.

== Administration ==
Bancharampur Upazila is divided into 13 union parishads: Ayabpur, Bancharampur, Dariadaulat, Darikandi, Fardabad, Manikpur, Pahariyakandi, Rupasdi, Saifullyakandi, Salimabad, Sonarampur, Tezkhali, and Ujanchar. The union parishads are subdivided into 69 mauzas and 121 villages.

== Villages ==
Pahariakandi Union

- Joykalipur
- Nabipur
- Domrakandi
- Ulokandi
- Barokandi
- Kalakandi
- Hijlakandi
- Pahariakandi
- Munshinagar

Saifullakandi Union

- Vhelanagar
- Darivhelanagar
- Fatapur
- Baluakandi
- Sarifpur
- Paratuli
- Kanchanpur
- Moddonagar
- Domrakandi
- Saifullakandi
- Mangolhati
- Machimnagar

Darikandi Union

- Khalla
- Krisnonagar
- Bahadurpor
- Darikandi
- Darigou
- Gokolnagar
- Gopalnagar
- Imamnagar
- Gibongonj

Rupasdi Union

- Rupasdi
- Hoglakandi
- Kawarpur

Farhabad Union

- Fardabad
- Nijkandi
- Gaouratuli
- Tilokkandi
- Purbohati
- Kalakandi
- Charlahania

Tezkhali Union

- Joynagar
- Imamnagar
- Akanagar
- Gotkandi
- Horinagar
- Bishnorampur
- Baherchor
- Tezkhali
- Hasonnagar

Dariadulat Union

- Moricahkandi
- Bakhornagar
- Noton Kodomtuli
- Sutkikandi
- Tatuakandi
- Kodomtuli
- Dariadulat
- Kalainagar

Sonarampur Union

- Charmochakandi
- Kanainagar
- Shantipur
- Ishapur
- Dularampur
- Ferizzakandi
- Sonarampur
- Charshibpur

Bancharampur Union

- Dashdona
- Jogonathpur
- Bancharampur
- Dari-Bancharampur
- Vitijograrchar
- Durgarampur
- Safirkandi
- Durgapur
- Alipur
- Manaikhali
- Ponchampur
- Dhariarchar
- Khoshkandi
- Telikandi
- Bhabanathpur

Ayubpur Union

- Bashgari
- Doshani
- Ayubpur
- Char-chaiani
- Nagarirchar
- Kanainagar
- Kashnagar
- Kariyakandi
- Poddapur

Salimabad Union

- Salimabad
- Shahebnagar
- Nilokhi
- Pakhyarchar
- Satbilla
- Kamalpur
- Mirpur
- Asarafbad
- Hossainpur
- Haidornagar
- Tatoakandi
- Vurvuria
- Gongachar
- Khagkanda
- Junarchar
- Phathamara

Purbo Ujanchar Union

- Notonhati
- Sorisharchar
- Shekerkandi
- Ujanchar
- Krishnonagar
- Budhaikandi
- Radhanagar
- Kalikapur

Manikpur Union

- Kayallanpur
- ManikPUR
- Charani
- Ulokandi
- Kapaskandi
- Do-ani
- Mayarampur
- Baherchar

== See also ==
- Upazilas of Bangladesh
- Districts of Bangladesh
- Divisions of Bangladesh
