= Brahmanbaria Sadar Upazila =

Brahmanbaria Sadar ব্রাহ্মণবাড়িয়া সদর
- Upazila
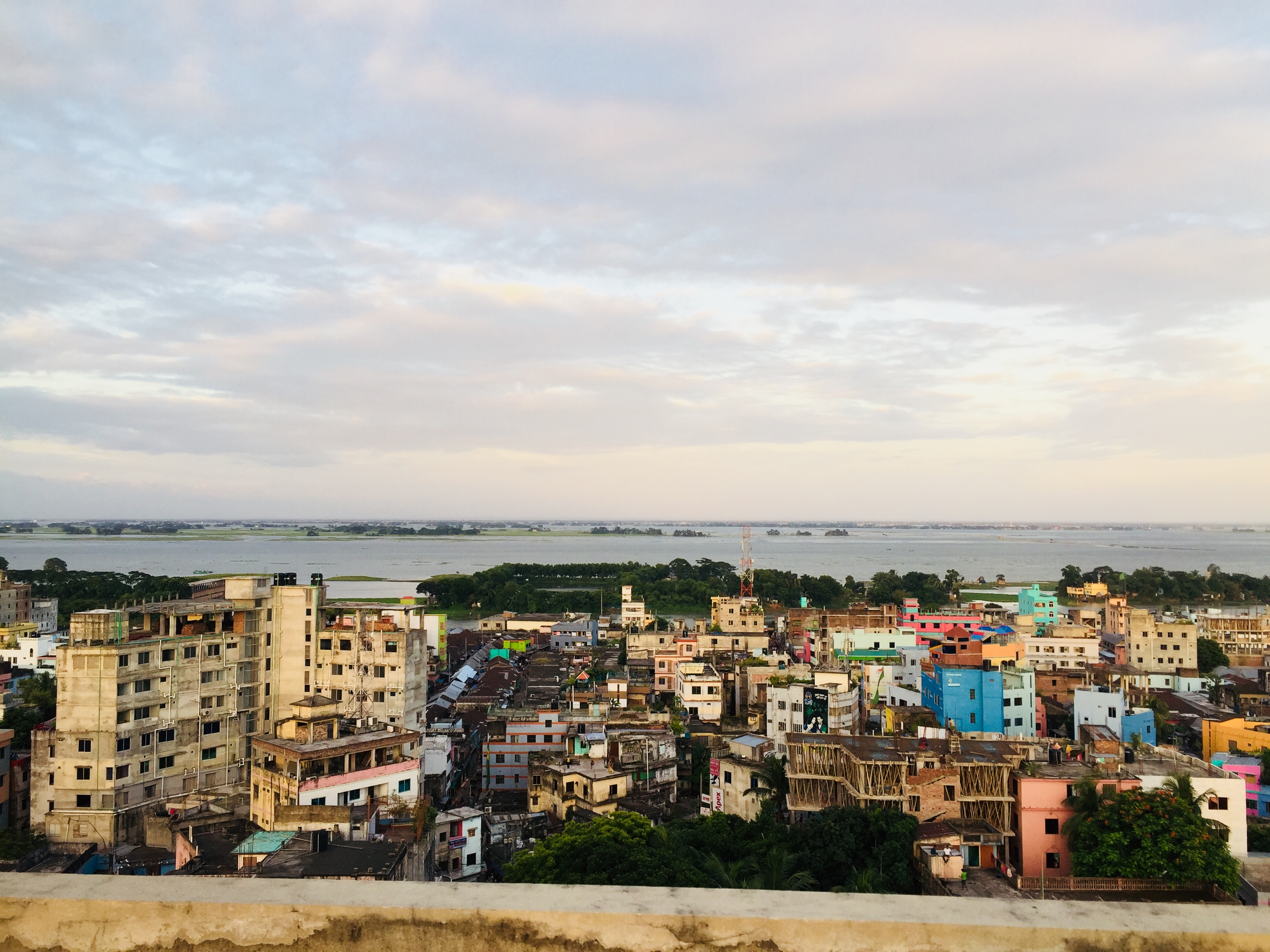
- Skyline of Brahmanbaria near Titas River

- Coordinates: 23°57.2′N 91°7′E
- Country: Bangladesh
- Division: Chittagong
- District: Brahmanbaria
- Headquarters: Brahmanbaria

Government
  - Upazilla Chairman: Shahadat Hossain Shovon (Bangladesh Chhatra League)

Area
  - Total: 237.34 km^{2} (91.64 sq mi)

Population (2022)
  - Total: 677,243
  - Density: 2,199/km^{2} (5,700/sq mi)
- Time zone: UTC+6 (BST)
- Postal code: 3400
- Area code: 0851
- Website: sadar.brahmanbaria.gov.bd

Brahmanbaria Sadar Upazila mauza geocode map

Brahmanbaria Sadar (Bengali: ব্রাহ্মণবাড়িয়া সদর) is an upazila of Brahmanbaria District in the Division of Chittagong, Bangladesh. Brahmanbaria Sadar is located at 23.9528°N 91.1167°E.

== History ==
The area Syed Mahmud resided in was named Kazipara (Kazi being a variant of Qadi) after him, and his mazar (mausoleum) remains there.

Brahmanbaria Thana was converted into an upazila in 1984.

However, there are many opinions or discussions among the locals about the name of Brahmanbaria district being "Brahmanbaria". The most popular and accepted discussion is that once upon a time there were many people of Sanatan religion living in Brahmanbaria. (There are still significant Sanatan religious people living in various places). Then there was lack of Brahmins to perform puja or religious rituals for orthodox people. The then king of the region sent several Brahmin families from faraway Calcutta to settle here. From there the name of this area is Brahmanbaria. Initially a few families lived in Kazipara and Kandhipara areas of the city. Originally the name of this place was Brahmanbari. Later on, the entire district was named Brahmanbaria.

== Demographics ==
Religions in Brahmanbaria Sadar Upazila (2022)
Religion	Percent
Islam	93.86%
Hinduism	6.06%
Other or not stated	0.08%

According to the 2022 Bangladeshi census, Brahmanbaria Sadar Upazila had 141,126 households and a population of 677,243. 11.33% of the population were under 5 years of age. Brahmanbaria Sadar had a literacy rate (age 7 and over) of 78.05%: 77.23% for males and 78.79% for females, and a sex ratio of 92.18 males for every 100 females. 266,432 (39.34%) lived in urban areas.

According to the 2011 Census of Bangladesh, Brahmanbaria Sadar Upazila had 95,802 households and a population of 521,994. 150,202 (28.77%) were under 10 years of age. Brahmanbaria Sadar had a literacy rate (age 7 and over) of 53.41%, compared to the national average of 51.8%, and a sex ratio of 1019 females per 1000 males. 193,814 (37.13%) lived in urban areas.

According to the 1991 Bangladesh census, Brahmanbaria Sadar had a population of 659,449. Males constituted 51.38% of the population, and females 48.62%. The population aged 18 or over was 312,696. Brahmanbaria Sadar had an average literacy rate of 30.1% (7+ years), against the national average of 32.4%.

== Administration ==
Brahmanbaria Sadar Upazila is divided into Brahmanbaria Municipality and 11 union parishads: Basudeb, Bodhal, Dakshin Natai, Machihata, Majlishpur, Ramrail, Sadekpur, Shuhilpur, Sultanpur, Talsahar, and Uttar Natai. The union parishads are subdivided into 103 mauzas and 146 villages.

Brahmanbaria Municipality is subdivided into 12 wards and 34 mahallas.

== See also ==
- Upazilas of Bangladesh
- Districts of Bangladesh
- Divisions of Bangladesh
