= Brahmanbaria =

Brahmanbaria ব্রাহ্মণবাড়িয়া
- City
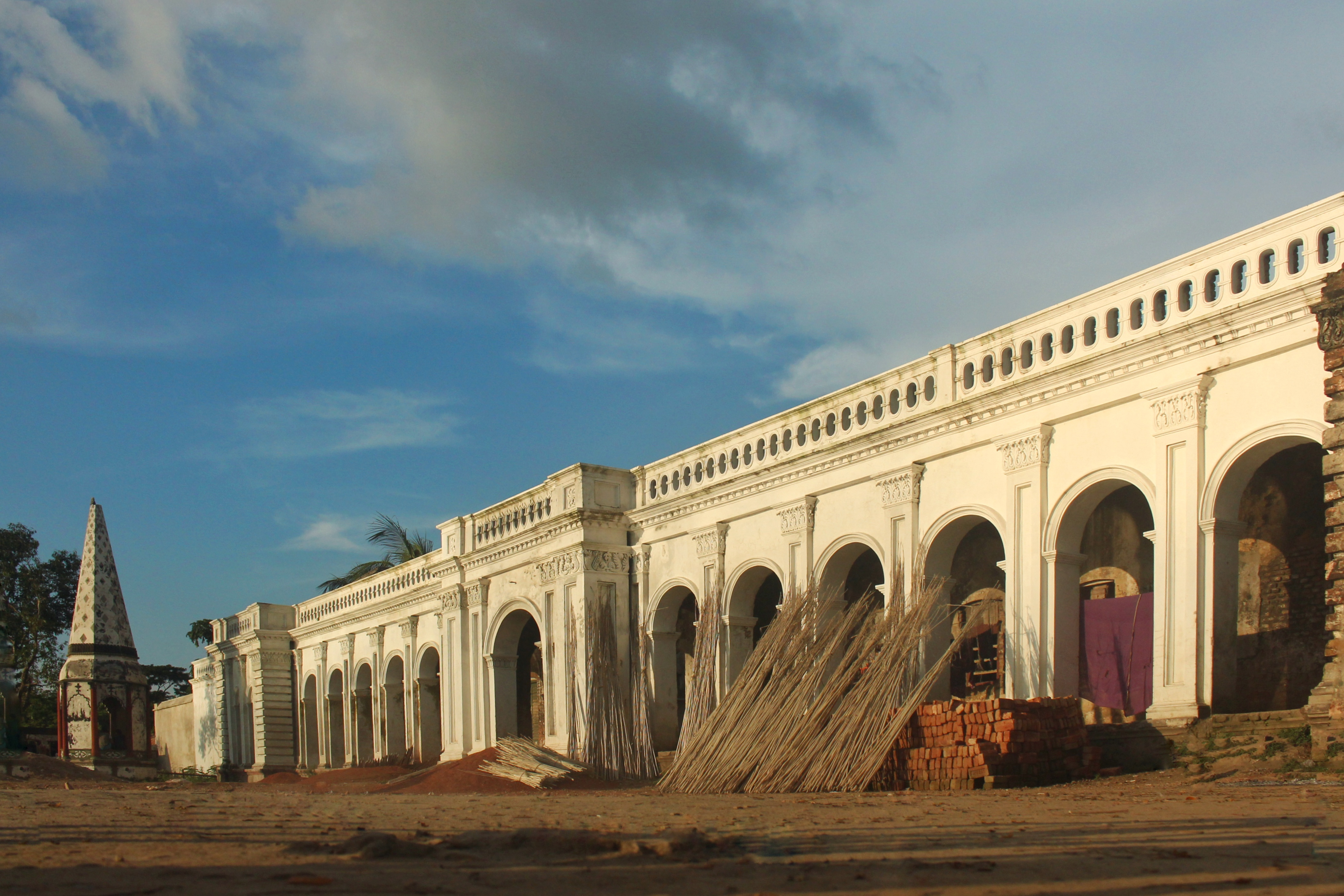
- Front view of Haripur Barabari
- Nickname: Baunbaira
- Location in Chittagong division Brahmanbaria (Bangladesh)
- Coordinates: 23.965593°N 91.107997°E
- Country: Bangladesh
- Division: Chittagong
- District: Brahmanbaria
- Upazila: Brahmanbaria Sadar
- Establishment: Late 1700 CE
- Municipality: 1868
- Administrative District: 1984

Government
  - Type: Pourashava
  - City Mayor: Nayar Kabir

Area
  - Total: 18.5 km^{2} (7.1 sq mi)
- Elevation: 15 m (49 ft)

Population (2022)
  - Total: 264,341
  - Density: 14,300/km^{2} (37,000/sq mi)
- Demonym: Brahmanbarian
- Time zone: UTC+6 (BST)
- Postal code: 3400
- National Calling Code: +880
- Local Calling Code: +88-0851

Brahmanbaria (Bengali: ব্রাহ্মণবাড়িয়া, romanized: Brāhmaṇabāṛiẏā) is a city of Bangladesh and the capital of Brahmanbaria Sadar Upazila as well as Brahmanbaria District. It is the second largest city after Cumilla in eastern Bangladesh and one of the oldest municipalities in Bangladesh, established in 1868. Brahmanbaria was declared a district headquarters in 1984. Its municipality area has a population of 265,000 in 2022. It is the 14th largest city in Bangladesh. The largest gas field in Bangladesh named Titash Gas Field is located in Brahmanbaria.

Brahmanbaria Municipality mahallah geocode map

== Etymology ==
There are different views about how Brahmanbaria got its name. It is said that during the Sen dynasty, a shortage of Brahmins caused problems in worship. So, King Lakshman Sen brought some Brahmin families from Adisur's Kanyakunj to the area. Some of these families built homes in this place. Thus, the place was named Brahmanbaria because of the Brahmins' houses there.

== History ==
Brahmanbaria was made a municipality in 1868.

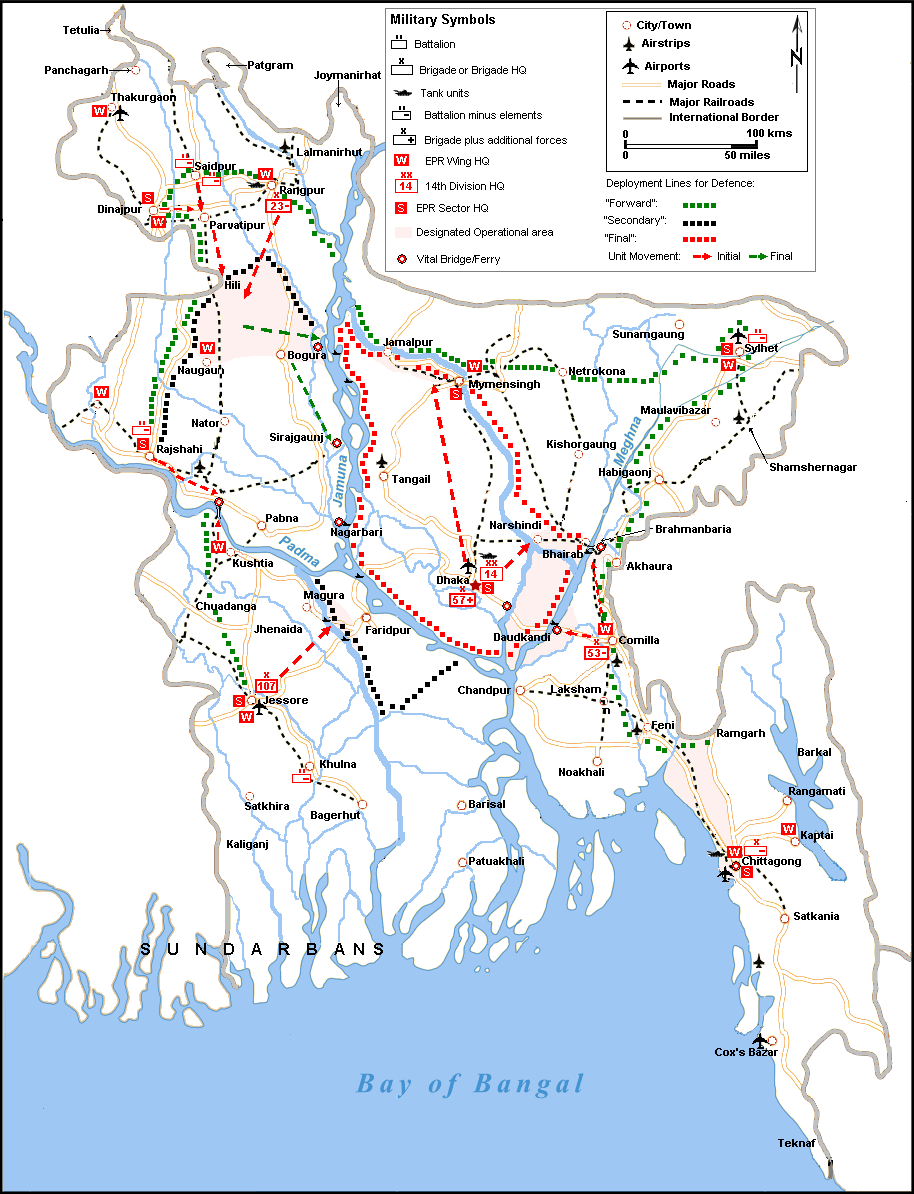
Pakistani Eastern Command plan for the defence of East Pakistan from 1967 to 1971 (generic representation—some unit locations not shown)

During the Indo-Pakistan War of 1971 for the liberation of Bangladesh, when Pakistan Army planners predicted India would launch its main attack in the east along the Akhaura–Brahmanbaria axis, it had no brigades available to cover this area, and Pakistan Army moved its 27th brigade from Mymensingh to Akhaura after retaining two battalions of 27th brigade at Mymensingh to form the 93rd Brigade to defend Mymensingh. Pakistan Army's 93,000 troops unconditionally surrendered to the Indian Army and India's local ally Mukti Bahini on 16 December 1971. This day and event is commemorated as the Bijoy Dibos (Bengali: বিজয় দিবস) in Bangladesh and Vijay Diwas in India.

== Administration ==
Brahmanbaria was given city status in 1868. Brahmanbaria Municipality is subdivided into 12 wards.

== Geography and climate ==
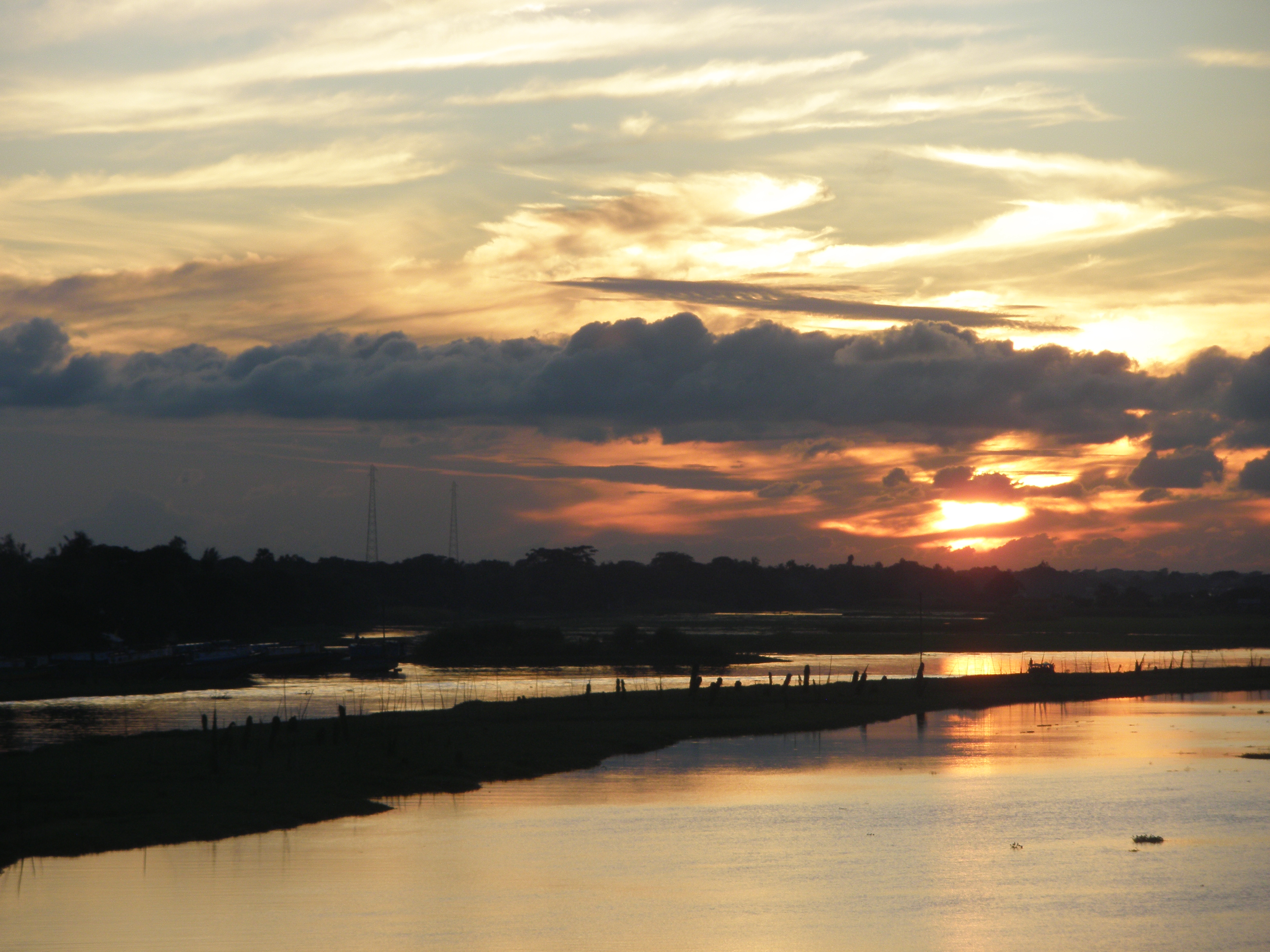
The Titas River, seen from Brahmanbaria

Brahmanbaria is located in the East-Central region of Bangladesh. Its nearby cities are Dhaka, Comilla, Narayanganj and Agartala. This city is in the bank of Titas River. Also there is Meghna River in the west of Brahmanbaria.

Brahmanbaria has a tropical wet and dry climate.

Climate data for Brahmanbaria
Month	Jan	Feb	Mar	Apr	May	Jun	Jul	Aug	Sep	Oct	Nov	Dec	Year
Mean daily maximum °C (°F)	25 (77)	28 (82)	32 (90)	33 (91)	33 (91)	32 (90)	32 (90)	32 (90)	32 (90)	31 (88)	29 (84)	27 (81)	31 (87)
Daily mean °C (°F)	18 (64)	22 (72)	26 (79)	28 (82)	28 (82)	29 (84)	29 (84)	29 (84)	28 (82)	27 (81)	22 (72)	22 (72)	25 (77)
Mean daily minimum °C (°F)	10 (50)	14 (57)	19 (66)	22 (72)	23 (73)	25 (77)	25 (77)	25 (77)	24 (75)	23 (73)	17 (63)	17 (63)	20 (69)
Average precipitation mm (inches)	14.4 (0.57)	39.8 (1.57)	72.8 (2.87)	168.2 (6.62)	315.4 (12.42)	344.9 (13.58)	367.9 (14.48)	247.5 (9.74)	197.6 (7.78)	148.5 (5.85)	30.4 (1.20)	8.9 (0.35)	1,956.3 (77.03)
Average precipitation days (≥ 0.1 mm)	4	5	7	12	19	23	28	26	22	13	3	1	163
Source: Worldweatheronline

== Demographics ==
Religions in Brahmanbaria city (2022)
Religion	Percent
Islam	89.98%
Hinduism	9.85%
Other or not stated	0.17%

According to the 2022 Bangladesh census, Brahmanbaria city had 56,898 households and a population of 264,341. Brahmanbaria had a sex ratio of 96.44 females per 100 males and a literacy rate of 83.33%. 21.30% of the population were under 10 years of age.

== Notable residents ==
- Abdul Quadir, poet, essayist, and journalist, attended Brahmanbaria Annada Model High School.
- Al Mahmud, poet, was born at Murail in 1936.
- Ali Azam, member of parliament, was an organizer of the Bangladesh Liberation War in Brahmanbaria.
- Mamun Khan, who played for the Bangladesh national football team, lives near the stadium in Brahmanbaria.
- Mohammed Kaikobad, football player and coach, started his career in Brahmanbaria with Kazipara Union Club.
- Syed Abdul Hadi, singer, matriculated from Brahmanbaria Annada Model High School.
- Tasnova Hoque Elvin, actress and model, was born in Brahmanbaria in 1990.
- Zakia Bari Mamo, actress and model, learned to sing and dance at the Alauddin Khan Sangeetanga.

== Gallery ==
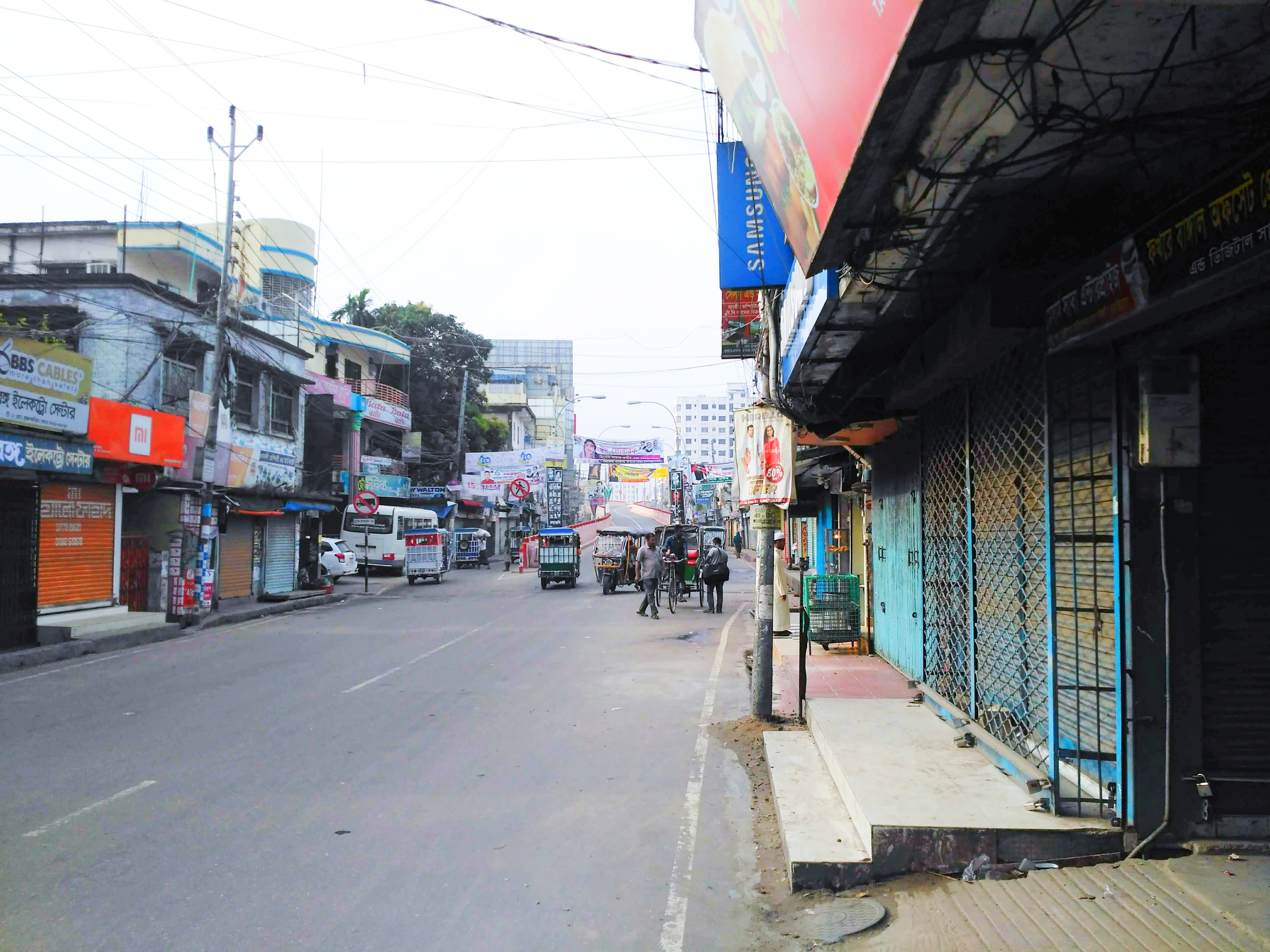
T A Road near Kandipara in Brahmanbaria town

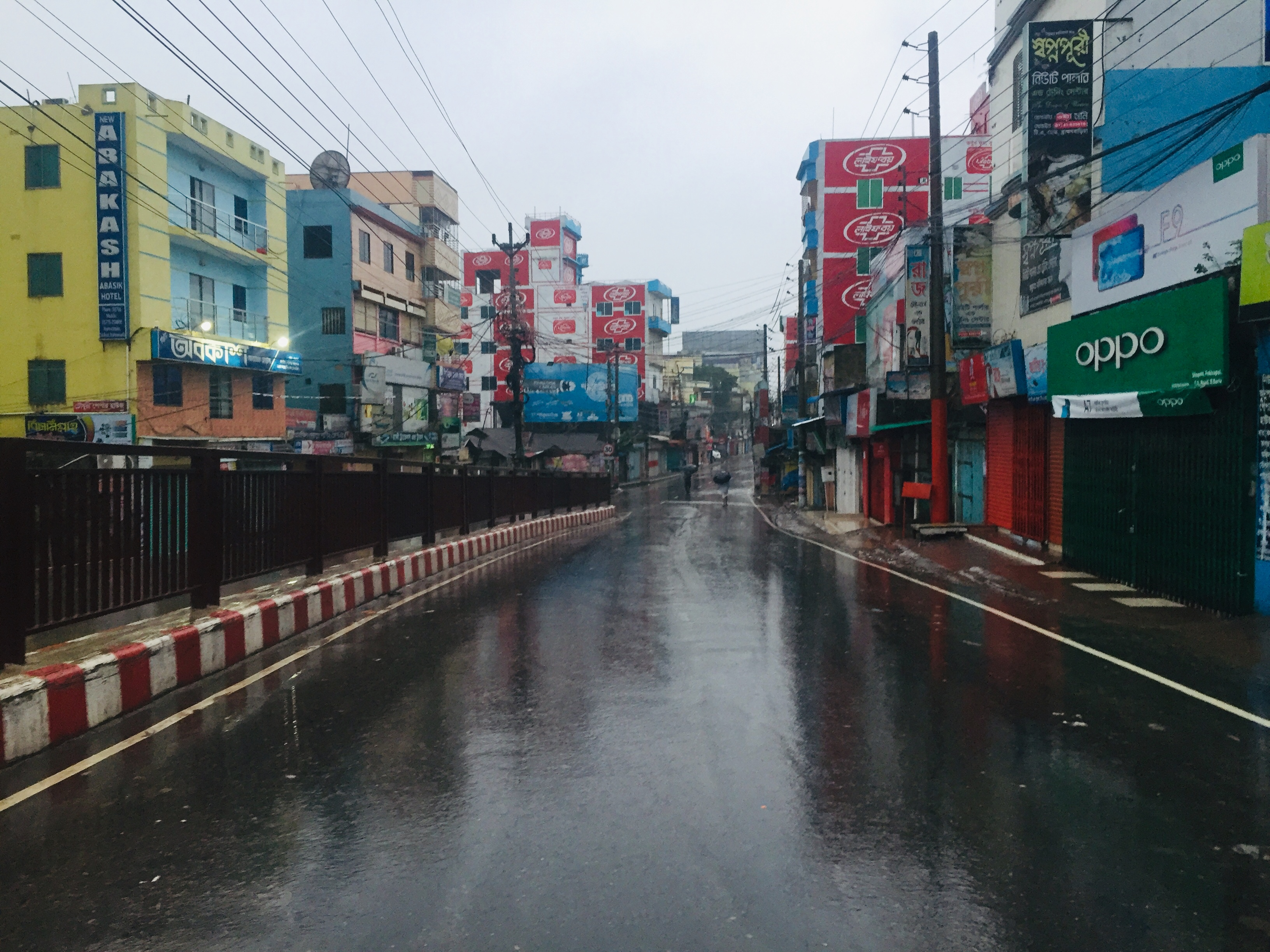
T A Road, Brahmanbaria

== See also ==
- Economy of Brahmanbaria
- List of colleges and universities in Brahmanbaria
- Tourism in Brahmanbaria
- Chhanamukhi
