= Hammick =

Hammick is a surname. Notable people with the surname include:

- Dalziel Hammick (1887–1966), English research chemist
- Georgina Hammick (1939–2023), English writer
- Sir Murray Hammick (1854–1936), Indian civil servant and administrator

== See also ==
- Hammick baronets, a title in the Baronetage of the United Kingdom created 1834
- Hammick reaction, named after Dalziel Hammick, a chemical reaction
