= Tom Hammick =

British painter (born 1963)

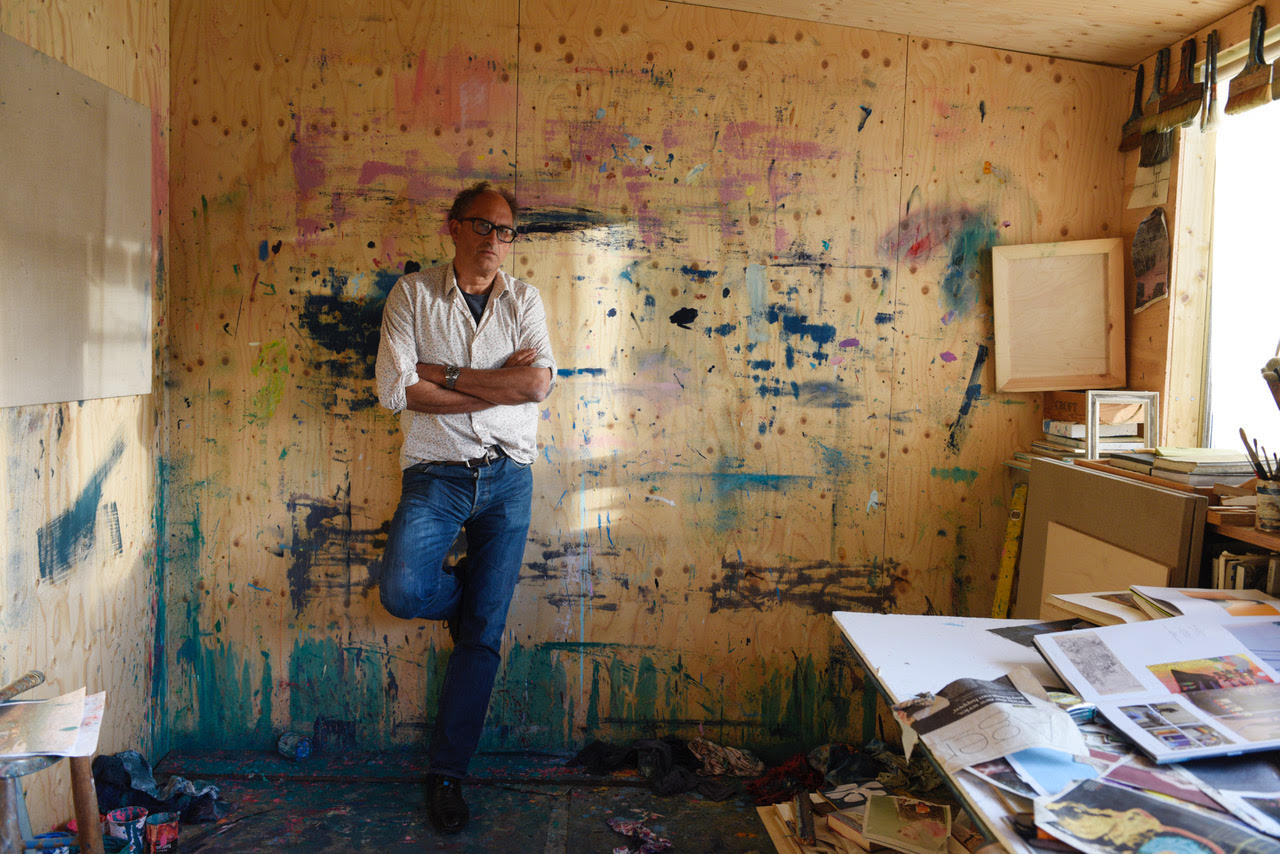
- Born: Tidworth, Wiltshire, England
- Education: West Downs School; Eton College; Art History and Medieval History, University of Manchester; BFA and an MA in Printmaking, Camberwell College of Art
- Known for: Painting and printmaking
- Mother: Georgina Hammick
- Website: https://tomhammick.com

Thomas Henry Heyman St. Vincent Hammick (born 1963) is a painter, printmaker and former teacher working in London. He was Glyndebourne's Associate Artist during the 2021 and 2022 festivals.

== Early life ==
Hammick's mother, Georgina Hammick (24 May 1939 – 8 January 2023), was a poet and novelist, and his father, Major Charles Cyril Willmott Hammick (24 October 1927 – 1 February 1990), was a senior officer in the Grenadier Guards, Parachute Regiment and then the Trucial Oman Scouts, later becoming a bookseller. They both founded Hammicks Bookshops in 1968 in Farnham, Surrey.

Hammick's second great-grandfather was Sir St Vincent Love Hammick, 2nd Baronet (1806–1888) of the Hammick Baronetcy, of Cavendish Square, London. His great-grandfather was Sir Murray Love Hammick KCSI CIE (11 May 1854 – 4 March 1936)

Hammick attended the preparatory school West Downs School in Winchester, followed by Eton College in Berkshire.

Hammick graduated with a degree in Art History and Medieval History from the University of Manchester (1982–85) and briefly worked as a Stonemason, initially a labourer on Salisbury Cathedral in 1985 followed by two years as a trainee builder with Ian Constantinides and his company St Blaise, in Dorset and Somerset. He went back to study a BA Fine Art (1987–90) and an MA in Printmaking from Camberwell College of Art (1990–92). Hammick was an exchange student with Nova Scotia College of Art and Design in Canada in 1989.

== Career ==
Upon completing his masters study in 1992, Hammick was appointed acting head of painting and drawing at Eton College, where he would have his first solo exhibition the same year. He then taught Fine Art (Painting and Printmaking) at Bucks Chilterns University College from 1998 to 2005 and then Fine Art and Printmaking at The University of Brighton until 2019. He also taught Studio Painting for three summer terms at Nova Scotia College of Art and Design between 1998 and 2002.

In 2014, he was appointed by the English National Opera as the first artist-in-residence. In 2015, artist Julian Bell wrote a book to survey the work of Hammick titled Tom Hammick Wall, Window, World published by Lund Humphries.

In 2017 he curated Towards Night, a major exhibition exploring the nocturnal through paintings, prints and drawings by over sixty artists at Towner Art Gallery.

His works are held in many major public and private collections, including Eton College, British Museum, Victoria and Albert Museum, Bibliothèque Nationale de France, Yale Center for British Art and The Library of Congress, Washington DC.

His work has inspired fashion designers like Louisa Ballou and a collaboration on an exhibition at the London store of designer Paul Smith.

=== Selected solo exhibitions ===
My Sister's Garden, Lyndsey Ingram Gallery, London, 2022

Night Paintings and Woodcuts, Tayloe Piggott Gallery, Jackson Hole, Wyoming, 2022

Nightfire, Lyndsey Ingram Gallery London, 2020

Lunar Voyage, United Kingdom, United States and Canada, 2017–2019. Art critic Donald Kuspit described it as "a series of seventeen exquisitely crafted, visionary woodcuts."

Night Animals, New Paintings, Flowers Gallery, Cork Street, 2019

Night Sky, Flowers Gallery, Cork Street, London, 2013

New Work, Eton College, Eton, 1992

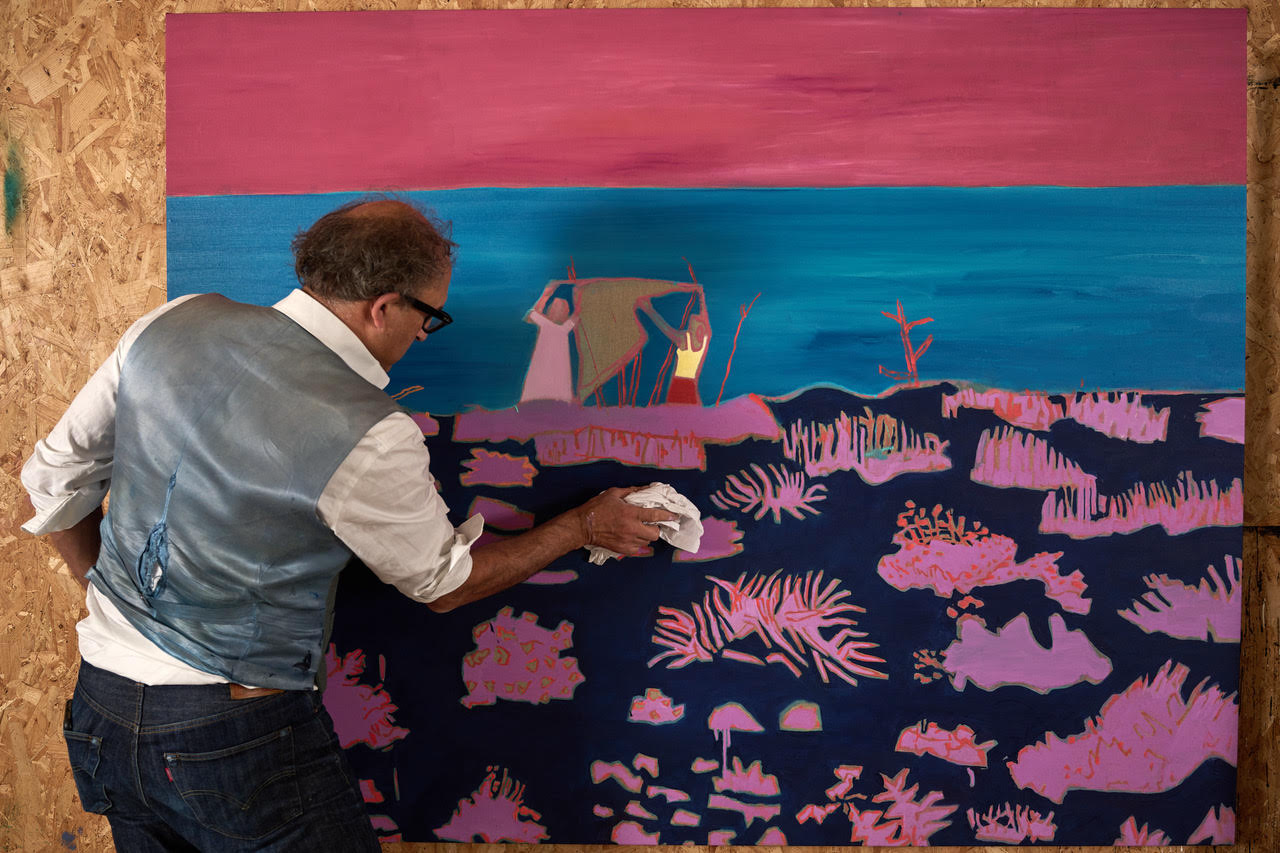
Tom Hammick working in his studio

=== Selected group exhibitions ===
The Moon, National Maritime Museum, London May 2019 to February 2020

NHS at 70, Seven selected artists with Jeremy Deller, Peter Blake, Elizabeth Magill, Chris Orr, Mona Hartoum, David Mach.

=== Selected awards ===
In 2016 he was the recipient of the V&A Prize at the International Print Biennale, Newcastle.

Shortlisted for both the Daiwa Foundation Art Prize and The Threadneedle Prize, 2012.

Winner of Nexus Art on Transport Commission Prize, 2009

The RA London Print Fair Prize, Royal Academy Summer Exhibition, 2005

Jerwood Drawing Prize 2004, Prize-winner

=== Selected publications ===
Hammick's woodcuts, made with wood gathered from Wordsworth's garden of Alfoxden, were published alongside the text of author Adam Nicolson's book The Making of Poetry: Coleridge, the Wordsworths and Their Year of Marvels published by HarperCollins in 2019.

His artwork was on the cover of Granta 154: I've Been Away for a While.

Lunar Voyage, published by Flowers East, 2018

Nightfire by Tom Hammick published by Lyndsey Ingram, 2020
