= Syed Shamsul Huda =

Indian politician (1862–1922)

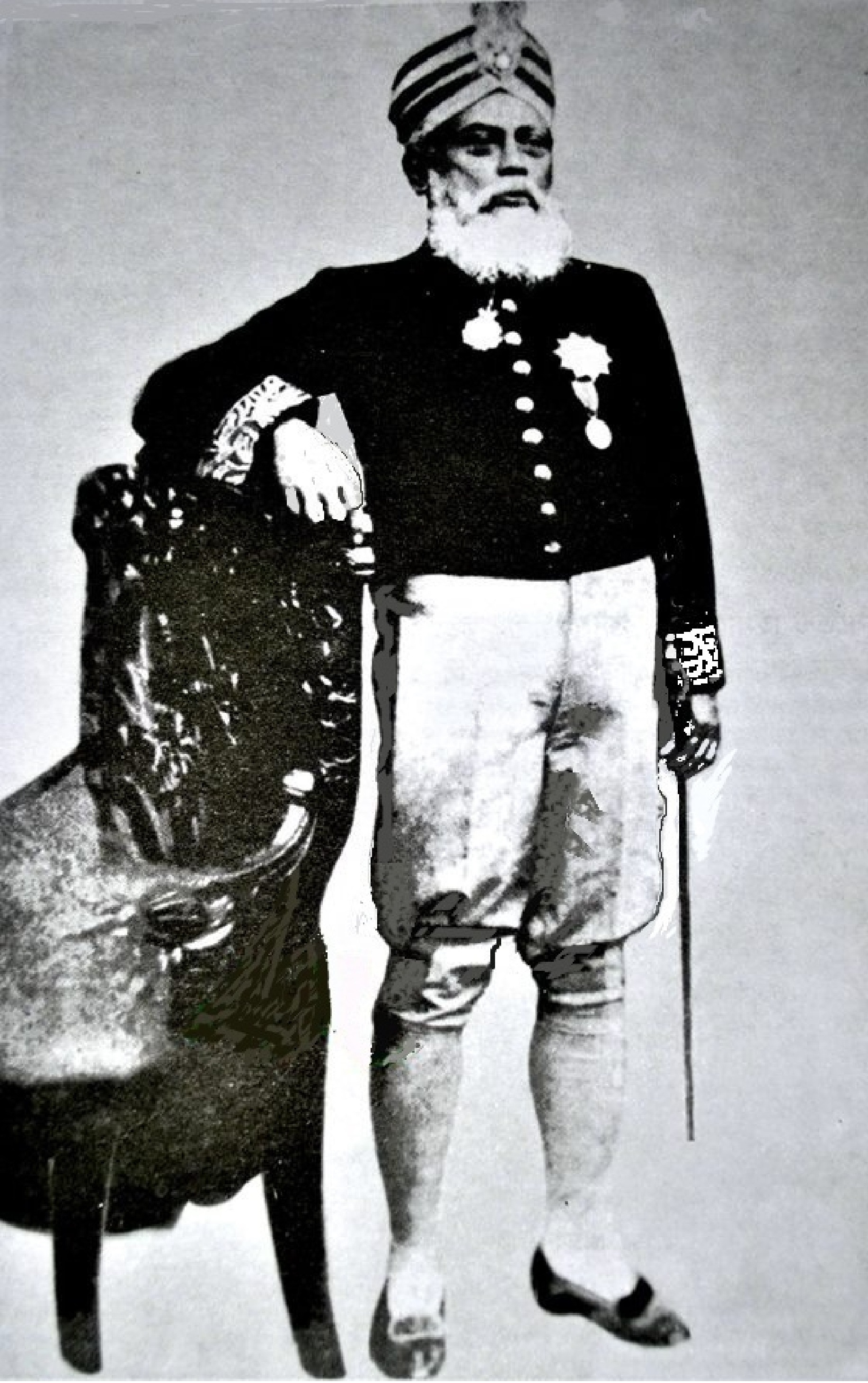
- Huda in 1913
- Born: 1862; Brahmanbaria, Bengal Presidency, British India
- Died: 14 October 1922 (aged 59–60); Calcutta, Bengal Presidency, British India
- Father: Shah Syed Reazutullah

Sir Syed Shamsul Huda KCIE (1862–1922) was a Muslim political leader of the Bengal Executive Council. He became the first British Indian Muslim President of the Legislative council in 1921. Huda was born in Gokarna, palace known as Gokarna Nawab Bari Complex Nasirnager, Brahmanbaria. It was the part of Cumilla. Earlier known as greater Hill Tipperah. His father Syed Riazat Ullah was the editor of The Doorbeen, a Persian weekly journal.

== Education ==
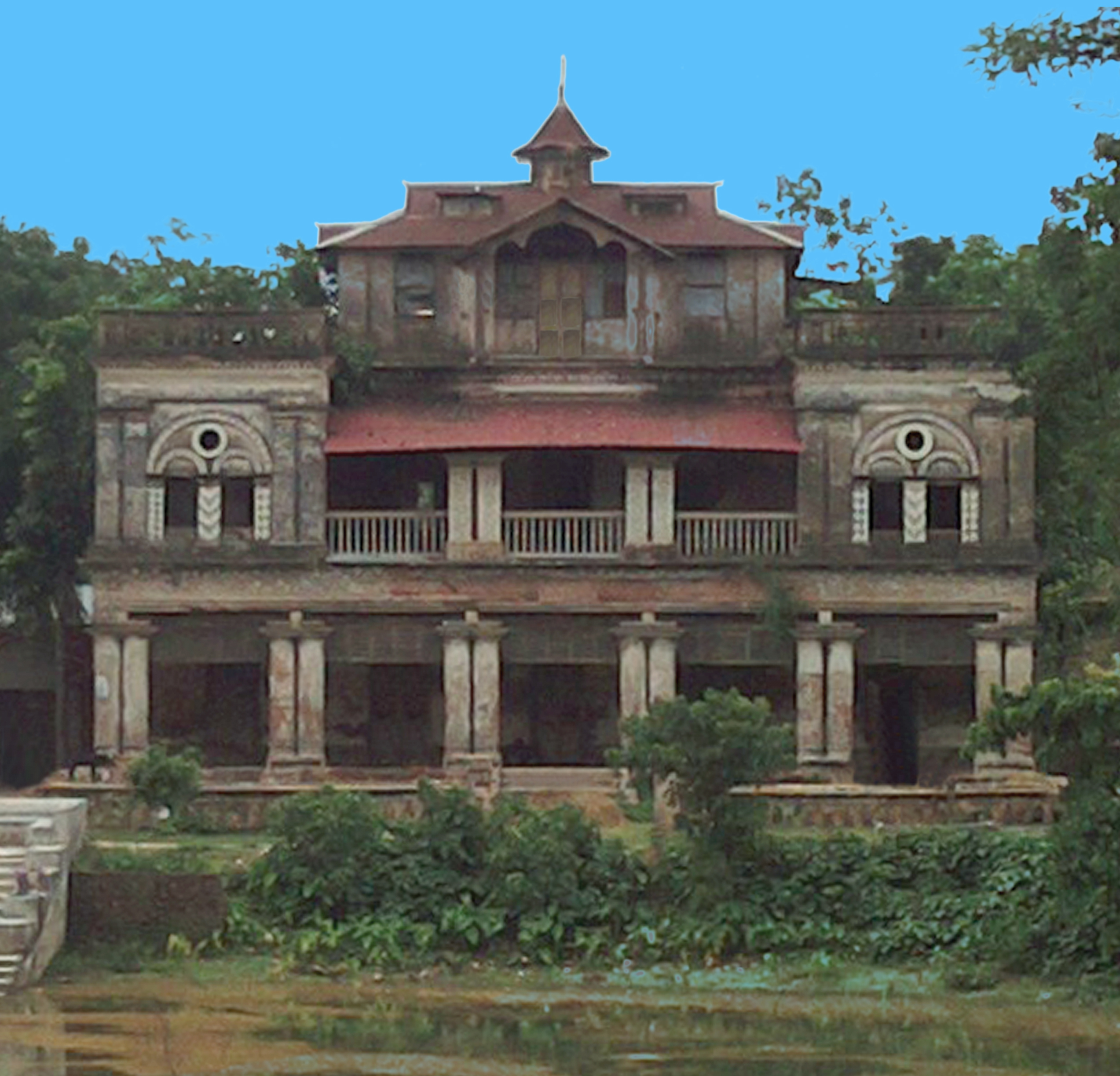
Gokarna Nawab Bari Complex, Brahmanbaria

Syed Shamsul Huda completed primary education at home. His father taught him Arabic, Persian, Urdu, Bengali, and Islamic ideology. For higher education, he went to Hooghly Madrasah at Calcutta. He became a BA from Presidency College in 1884, a BL from Calcutta University in 1886 and a MA in Persian, privately from Presidency College in 1889.

Huda was a student in many fields of knowledge. He was one of the most articulate Muslims of his age. He became an iconic British Indian Muslim scholar, writer, lawyer, powerful leader, and profound politician in the twentieth century.

== Career ==
Syed Shamsul Huda joined the Calcutta Madrasah as a lecturer in 1885. He decided to be a lawyer and started practicing in Calcutta High Court in 1887. That lead him to step into politics. The Indian National Congress was established in 1885 and proposed to all Indian people to join despite religions. They succeeded by collecting full support from great Indian Muslim leaders Syed Ahmad Khan, Nawab Abdul Latif, and Syed Ameer Ali. Later for few days, Congress leaders changed their opinion and started partitioning. Muslim leaders called the next Annual Meeting in 1895. Huda addressed to stop this and advised the ways to make a more united and effective Congress. His address is known as Indian Politics and the Muhammadans. Hence, he became at the top of the political body.

Huda opposed the budget for 1905. That was a budget created for the development of colleges, hospitals, and other institutions in Calcutta that was spending East Bengal's revenue. He proposed spending for such institutions in East Bengal for the welfare of East Bengal Muslims. But the elite Hindus highly opposed it. He wrote:

... The best of Colleges, Hospitals, and other institutions were founded in or near about the Capital of India.... [the] neglect of years and cannot be blamed if [we] require large sums to put our house in order.

He also mentioned on another occasion:

They [Hindus] have benefited for very many years out of the revenues of Eastern Bengal and have paid very little for its progress and advancement ...

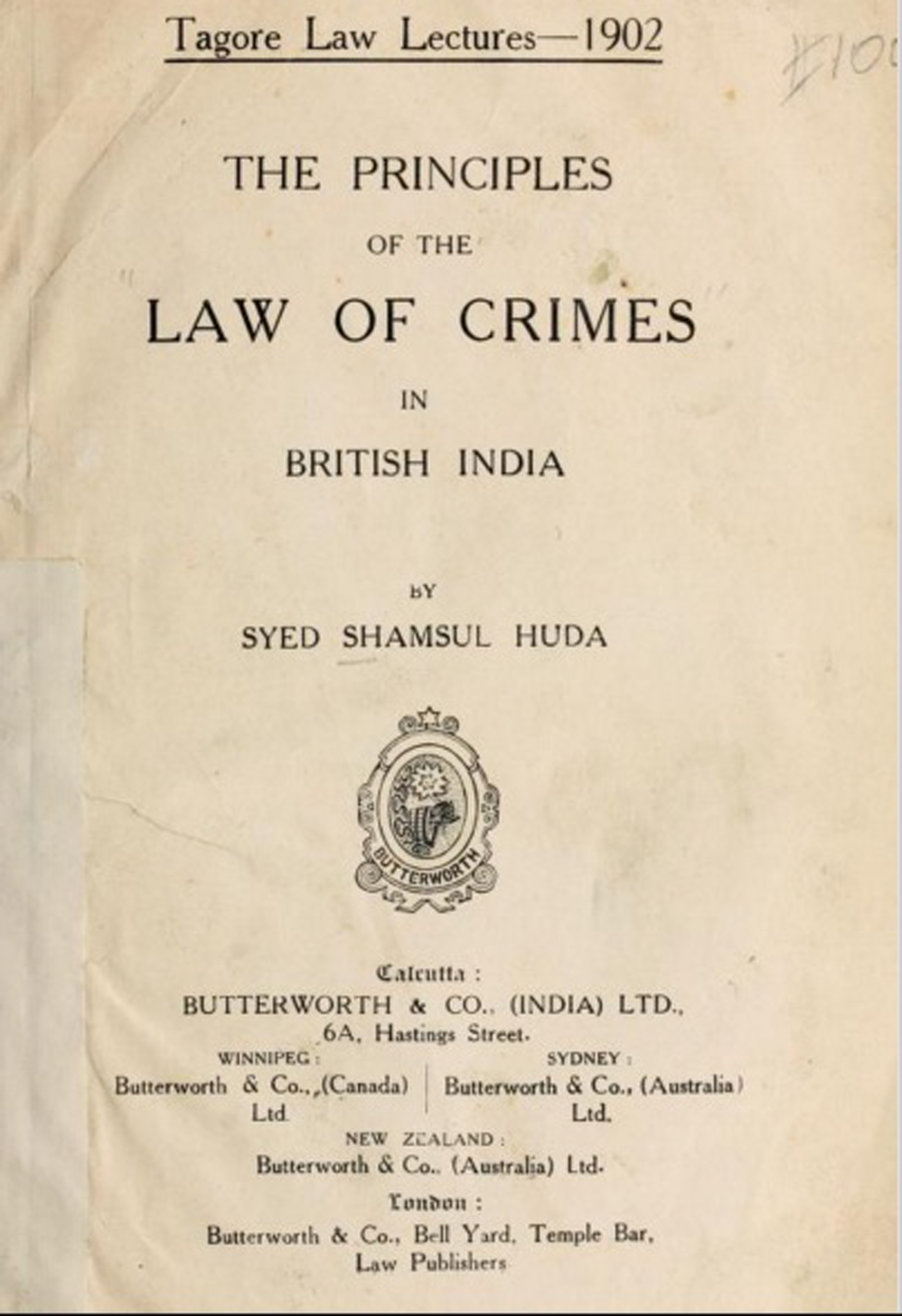
Tagore Law Lecture - "The Principles of the Law of Crimes in British India"

Authority selected Huda as a fellow of Calcutta University in 1902. He delivered the historical Tagore Law Lecture published in a book named The Principles of the Law of Crimes in British India by Butterworth & Co,(India) Ltd. Jeremy Bentham, William Austin, and William Blackstone influenced him. He presided Muhammadan Educational Conference at Rajshahi in 1904, the East Bengal and Assam Legislative Assembly member in 1908, the All India Muslim League President in 1910, and Imperial Legislative Council between 1911 and 1915.

He is one of the leaders of public opinion in his Province, and is On the forefront of all movements concerning the Mohammadan community.

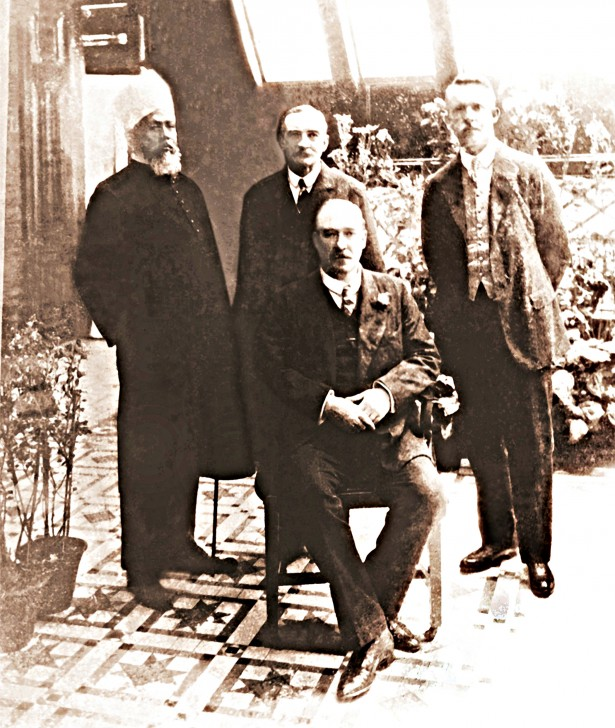
Executive Council: Thomas Gibson-Carmichael (seated) and (standing left to right) Huda, Frederick William Duke, and P C Lion Chitty

Huda was the governor of Bengal's executive council member from 1912 to 1919. Rewarded as the nawab in 1913, KCIE in 1916 and the second judge in Calcutta High Court in 1917 from the East Bengal Muslim justice.

Thomas Gibson-Carmichael stated:

...my judgement the Mohamedan community in Bengal could have had no more sympathetic or better advocate than he has been.

Huda became the first British Indian Muslim president of the reoriented legislative council of East and West Bengal in 1921.

...he rendered the greatest service within his power to Bengal and to the Reforms - a service which will always be held in honourable remembrance.

Surendranath Banerjee stated:

...his demands for the rights and claims of his co-religionists. In fact he was a gentleman in the highest sense of the word.

...He worked round the clock to improve the existential condition of his fellow Muslims during his long and distinguished career as a jurist, leader and politician.

== Contributions to education ==
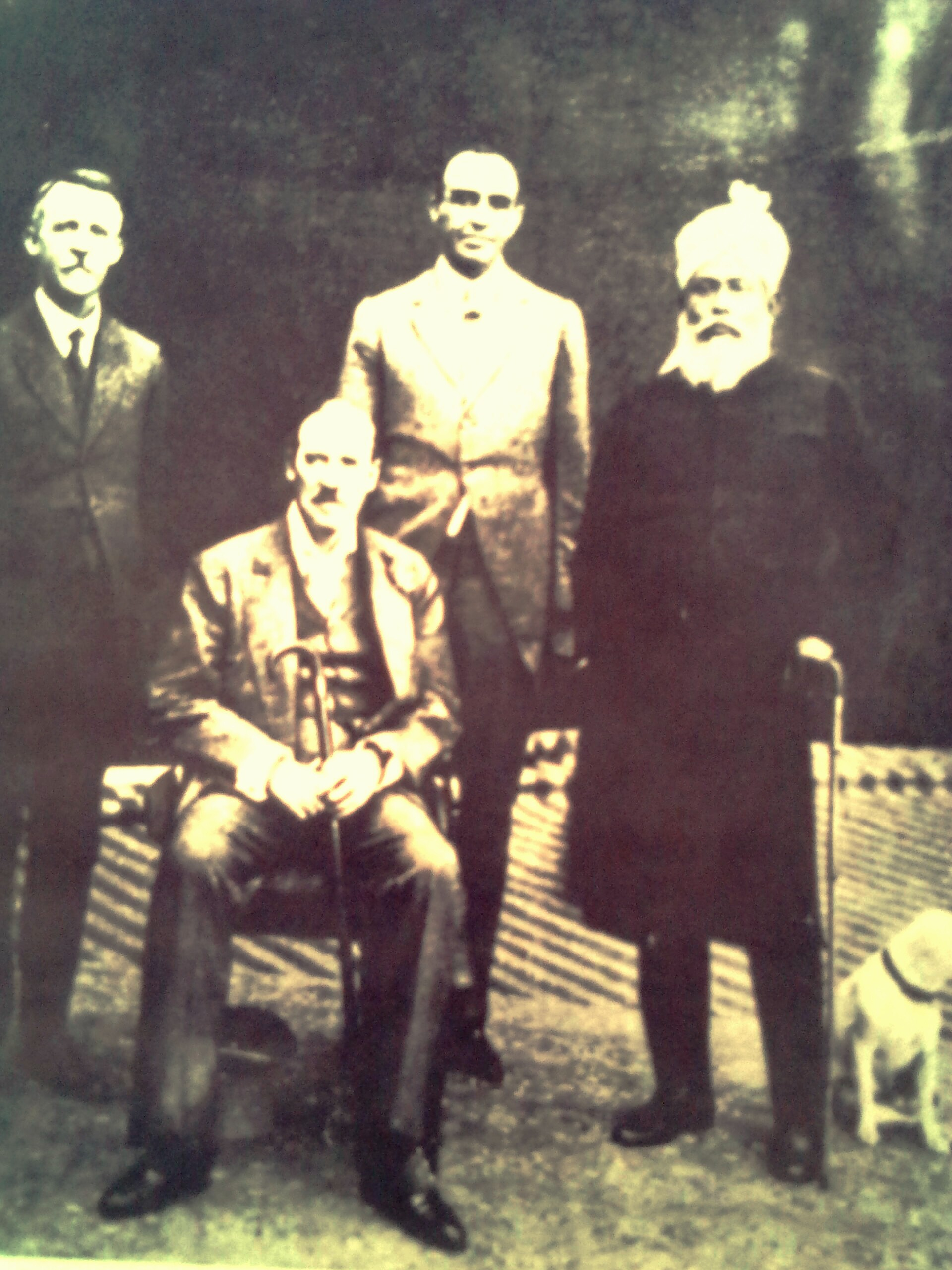
Executive Council (1912–1917):Thomas Gibson-Carmichael on the chair and standing from the right Huda, N D Beatson-Bell and P C Lion Chitty

Syed Shamsul Huda created accommodations founding Carmichael Hostel in Calcutta for rural university-going Muslim students of Bengal. He sanctioned two-thirds of funds from the government to establish the Elliot Madrasah Hostel in 1898. Estimated Rs. 5,400 contributed by the Nawab Abdul Latif Memorial Committee. He created the post of "assistant director for Muslim education" for each division.

Huda sanctioned the large sum of Rs. 900,000 from the Bengal government to purchase land to establish a government college for Muslims in Calcutta. The opening ceremony was postponed until 1926 due to the First World War when Abul Kasem Fazl-ul-Haq became education minister of the united province.

Huda founded Gokarna Syed Waliuallah High School naming his same-aged uncle on his paternal property in 1915. It was the first government-aided school in Nasirnagar for Hindu and Muslim students.

Major Hindu elites like Ashutosh Mukherjee and Shyamaprasad Mukherjee opposed the establishment of the University of Dhaka. However, Huda's involvement played a crucial in its founding in 1921. Lawrence Ronaldshay served as chancellor and appointed Huda as a life member of the university. On Huda's recommendation, A. F. Rahman was selected as a provost and subsequently appointed by Lord Ronaldshay.

Huda funded the journals Sudhakar (1889), The Urdu Guide Press, and The Muhammadan Observer (1880). He prevented religious obligation for women's education in Bengal. He supported and encouraged Begum Rokeya for women's education and development and her Bengal Women's Education Project.

== Death ==
Syed Shamsul Huda lived at 211 Lawyer Circular Road, Calcutta. He died on 14 October 1922 and was buried in Tiljola Municipal graveyard. The Calcutta Weekly Notes wrote of his death:

Sir Shamsul Huda has passed away at the time when his countrymen have stood in the greatest need of that happy combination of qualities which make leadership and which he possessed in a pre-eminent degree.
