= Ernest Austen Hammick =

English clergyman (1850–1920)

The Venerable Ernest Austen Hammick (3 January 1850 – 2 September 1920) was an English clergyman.

== Early life ==
Coat of arms of the Hammick baronets

Hammick was born on 3 January 1850 at Milton Abbot. He was the fourth son of the Rev. Sir St Vincent Hammick, 2nd Baronet and Mary Alexander. Among his siblings were Frances Grace Hammick (wife of George Andrew Spottiswoode, youngest son of Andrew Spottiswoode), Sir St Vincent Hammick, 3rd Baronet (who married Penelope Beauclerk, daughter of Charles William Beauclerk), and Sir Murray Hammick, the acting Governor of Madras.

His paternal grandparents were Sir Stephen Hammick, 1st Baronet, a noted surgeon and physician, and Frances Turquand (daughter of London merchant Peter Turquand). His maternal grandparents were Robert Alexander, a member of the Council of India, and Grace (née Blacker) Alexander.

Hammmick was educated at Charterhouse School. He matriculated at Exeter College, Oxford in May 1869, earning his Bachelor of Arts in 1873, and was ordained into the Church of England in 1874. He further earned his Master of Arts from Exeter in 1876.

== Career ==
While in England, he was curate of Christ Church, Albany Street from 1874 to 1877, and rector at Forraburry from 1877 (following the death of William John Kirkness) to 1885 and at St John, Westminster, from 1885 to 1886.

=== Ministry abroad ===
After moving to South Africa, he served as Archdeacon of Zululand from 1886 to 1889, and priest in charge at KwaMagwaza, Zululand from 1888 to 1889, serving as canon of St Saviour's Cathedral, the home of the Anglican Diocese of Natal in Pietermaritzburg.

From 1889 to 1894, he served in Australia as incumbent at Blackall, Rockhampton from 1889 to 1892, and incumbent at Pittsworth, Brisbane from 1892 to 1894.

Returning to Africa, he was priest in charge at Bulawayo (a settlement that had been captured by British South Africa Company soldiers during the First Matabele War in 1893) from 1895 to 1897. In 1897, he became vicar of Ulhmatulzi. In 1899, he became Archdeacon of Durban, serving until 1907. He remained vicar of Ulhmatulzi until 1904 when he became vicar of St James, Umgeni, Durban, the largest city in the province of Natal, from 1904 to 1907.

=== Later life ===
Returning to England, he was rector of Elford, Staffordshire from 1909 to 1917. Upon retirement, he lived on Manor Road, St Marychurch, Torquay in the ceremonial county of Devon.

== Personal life ==
On 28 September 1897, he married Mary Elizabeth Amy (née Rymer) Popham, daughter of John Rymer and widow of The Very Rev. William Henry Fleury Popham of Bray Hill, Natal, South Africa.

Hammick died on 2 September 1920 at age 70.

Anglican Church of Southern Africa titles
Preceded by	Archdeacon of Zululand; 1886–1889	Succeeded by
Preceded by	Archdeacon of Durban; 1899–1907	Succeeded by
