= George Townshend =

George Townshend may refer to:

- George Townshend (Royal Navy officer) (1715–1769), British naval commander
- George Townshend, 1st Marquess Townshend (1724–1807), British field marshal, his nephew
- George Townshend, 2nd Marquess Townshend (1753–1811), British peer and politician, his son
- George Townshend, 3rd Marquess Townshend (1778–1855), his son
- George Townshend (Baháʼí) (1876–1957), author, promoter of the Bahá'í Faith
- George Townshend (priest) (fl. 1906–1947), Archdeacon of Clonfert and Kilmacduagh in the Church of Ireland
- George Townshend, 7th Marquess Townshend (1916–2010), great-great-great grandson of the 1st Marquess

== See also ==
- George Townsend (disambiguation)
