= Sir St Vincent Hammick, 2nd Baronet =

The Reverend Sir St Vincent Love Hammick, 2nd Baronet (July 1806 – 19 February 1888) was an English clergyman and baronet.

== Early life ==
Hammick was born in July 1806. He was the second son of Sir Stephen Love Hammick, 1st Baronet (1777–1867) and Frances Turquand. His elder brother, Dr. Stephen Love Hammick, died unmarried in 1839 before he could succeed to their father's baronetcy.

His paternal grandparents were Stephen Hammick, a surgeon and Alderman of Plymouth, and Elizabeth Margaret (née Love) Hammick. His uncle, Dr. Frederick Love Hammick, was a physician in the service of the Emperor of Russia. His maternal grandparents were Peter Turquand, a merchant in London, and Eliza (née Hicks) Turquand (a daughter of Thomas Hicks of Blackheath, London).

He graduated from Exeter College, Oxford with a Bachelor of Arts in 1828 and a Master of Arts in 1830.

== Career ==
After serving as a Fellow of Exeter College, he became the vicar at Milton Abbot, Devon in 1836.

Upon the death of his father on 15 June 1867, he succeeded as the 2nd Baronet Hammick, of Cavendish Square, London, which had been created for his father, a noted surgeon and physician, in the Baronetage of the United Kingdom in 1834.

== Personal life ==
On 6 April 1837, Hammick was married to Mary Alexander, daughter of Robert Alexander, CB, a member of the Council of India, and Grace Blacker. Together, they were the parents of:

- Frances Grace Hammick (c. 1837–1933), who married George Andrew Spottiswoode, youngest son of Andrew Spottiswoode, in 1863.
- Sir St Vincent Alexander Hammick, 3rd Baronet (1839–1927), who married Penelope Sarah Blanche Beauclerk, daughter of Charles William Beauclerk and Penelope Hulkes, in 1869. After her death, he married Elinor Lewis, daughter of Rev. Sir Gilbert Lewis, 3rd Baronet and Jane Antrobus, in 1890.
- Rachel Hammick (1840–1935), who married Everard Allen Ford, son of Rev. Joseph Ford, in 1877.
- Robert Frederick Hammick (1843–1922), a Vice-Admiral who married Grace Caroline Longman, daughter of William Longman, in 1884.
- Stephen Hammick (1846–1934), of the Bombay Civil Service; he married Caroline Constance Alicia Annie Maria Schneider, daughter of Lt.-Gen. Frederick Schneider and Louisa Fuller, in 1885.
- William Maxwell Hammick (1848–1915), the Mayor of Salisbury; he married Jane Hussey Townsend, daughter of George Barnard Townsend, in 1879.
- Ernest Austen Hammick (1850–1920), the Archdeacon of Durban and Archdeacon of Zululand; he married Mary Elizabeth Amy (née Rymer) Popham, daughter of John Rymer and widow of Very Rev. William Henry Fleury Popham, in 1897.
- John Eustace Hammick (1852–1943), who died unmarried.
- Sir Murray Hammick (1854–1936), the acting Governor of Madras; he married Ada Constance Searle, daughter of Maj.-Gen. Arthur Thaddeus Searle and Lucy Helen Byne, in 1883.
- Mary Caroline Hammick (c. 1856–1934), who died unmarried.

Sir St Vincent died on 19 February 1888 at age 81.

Baronetage of the United Kingdom
Preceded by Stephen Love Hammick	Baronet (of Cavendish Square); 1867–1888	Succeeded by St Vincent Alexander Hammick
