= George Townsend =

George Townsend may refer to:

- George Townsend (politician) (1769–1844), U.S. Representative from New York
- George Fyler Townsend (1814–1900), translator of the standard English edition of Aesop's Fables
- George Townsend (cricketer) (1814–1870), English cricketer
- George Townsend (priest) (1788–1857), English clergyman and author
- George Townsend (baseball) (1867–1930), American baseball player
- George Alfred Townsend (1841–1914), American journalist, war correspondent and novelist
- George Henry Townsend (1787–1869), English literary compiler and journalist
- George Townsend (footballer) (1957-), English footballer

== See also ==
- George Townshend (disambiguation)
