= Iltyd Nicholl Clayton =

British Army officer

Brigadier Sir Iltyd Nicholl Clayton KBE
- Born: September 15, 1886; Sandown, Isle of Wight, England
- Died: June 30, 1955 (aged 68); Weobley, Herefordshire
- Education: Lancing College; Royal Military Academy, Woolwich
- Spouse: Marjorie Clemence Duke
- Children: 3
- Military career
- Allegiance: United Kingdom
- Service: British Army
- Service years: 1906–1939
- Rank: Brigadier
- Units: Royal Garrison Artillery, Royal Artillery
- Awards: Commander of the Order of the British Empire (CBE) (1927); Knight Commander of the Order of the British Empire (KBE) (1949)
- Other work: Advisor on Arab Affairs to the British Government (1943–45); Special Advisor to Head of British Middle East Office; Minister attached to the British Embassy in Cairo (1947–48).

Brigadier Sir Iltyd Nicholl Clayton KBE (15 September 1886 – 30 June 1955) was a British Army officer notable for his attachment to the Middle East Office in Cairo during and after World War II and his involvement in the formation of Arab League and formulation of post-war British policy in the Middle East. Clayton also wanted to create the Greater Syria which would enhance the British dominating influence in the Middle East against Soviet threats, in addition to opposing an independent Jewish State in Palestine. Clayton conspired with others, including the Muslim Brotherhood in Egypt, to pressure King Farouk I into invading Israel in the 1948 Arab–Israeli War.

== Biography ==
Clayton was born in Sandown, Isle of Wight, the son of Lt. Col. William Lewis Nicholl Clayton and Maria Martha Pilkington. He was educated at Lancing College and the Royal Military Academy in Woolwich, then part of Kent. He was commissioned into the Royal Garrison Artillery in July 1906 and promoted lieutenant in 1909. He served in World War I, reaching the rank of major. After post-war spells in Iraq and Cairo, he served as Regimental lieutenant colonel of the Royal Artillery from 1934 to 1938 and retired in 1939. Recalled to service during the Second World War, he served as Advisor on Arab Affairs to the British Government (1943–45). He was later Special Advisor to Head of British Middle East Office and served as Minister attached to the British Embassy in Cairo (1947–48).

He was appointed a Commander of the Order of the British Empire (CBE) in the 1927 Birthday Honours and a Knight Commander of the same Order (KBE) in the 1949 New Year Honours.

== Personal life ==
His older brother, Gilbert, was also a British Army intelligence officer and colonial administrator.

He married Marjorie Clemence Duke, daughter of Sir William Duke. They had two daughters and one son. He died in Weobley, Herefordshire, aged 68.

== Bibliography ==
- Collins, Robert O. (1969), An Arabian Diary, Berkeley University of California Press
