= Jethagram =

Jethagram জেঠাগ্রাম
- Village
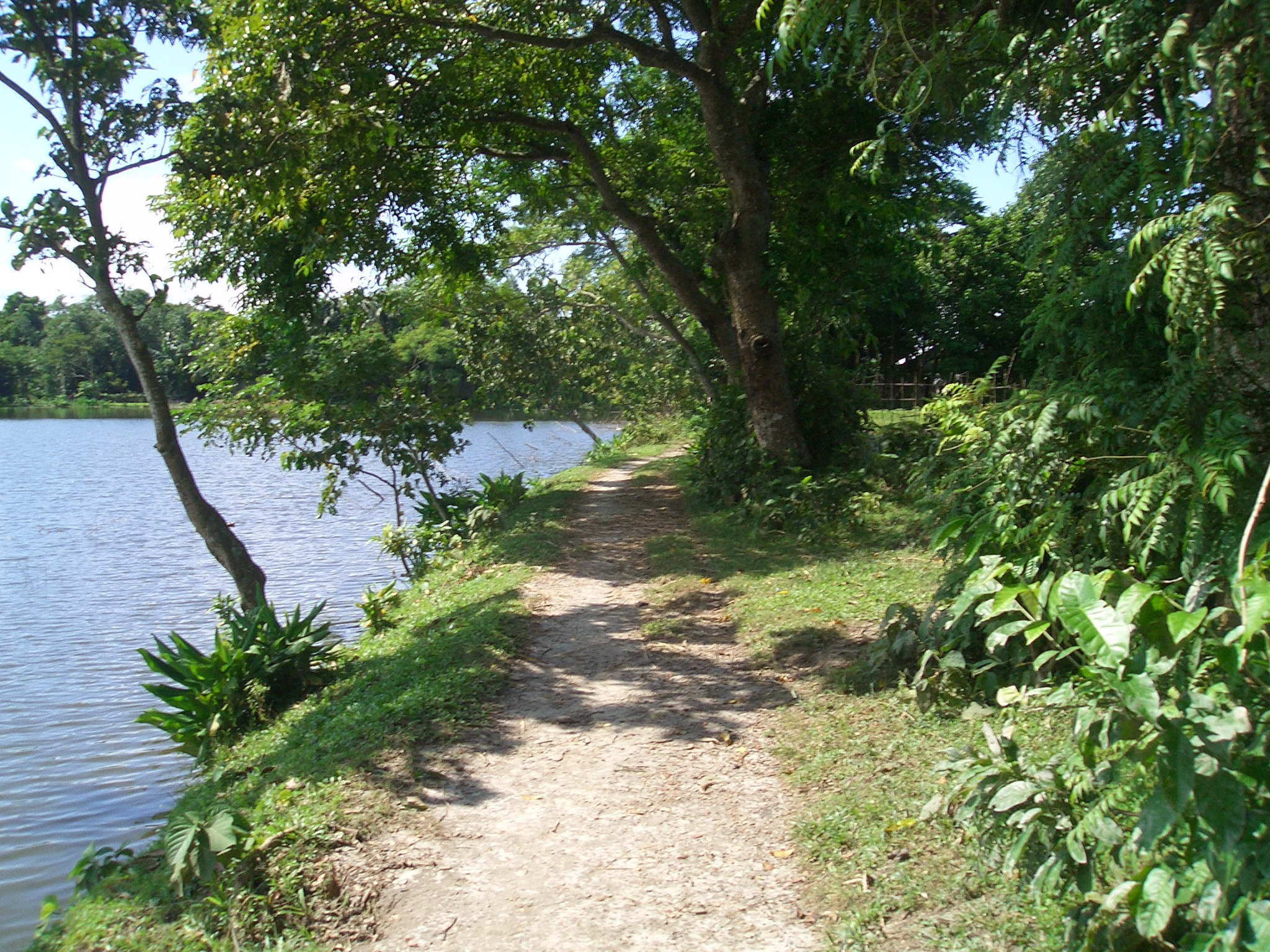
- Walk ways or Gopath

- Location in Bangladesh
- Coordinates: 24°08′31.7″N 91°12′19.3″E
- Country: Bangladesh
- Division: Chittagong Division
- District: Brahmanbaria District
- Time zone: UTC+6 (BST)
- Website: bangladesh.gov.bd/maps/images/brahmanbaria/Nasirnagar.gif

Jethagram (Bengali: জেঠাগ্রাম) is a village of Gokarna Union in Nasirnagar Upazila at Brahmanbaria District under Chittagong Division of eastern Bangladesh. This village is surrounded by paddy fields, ponds, deghees and jungles. Most of the people are engaged in agriculture and fisheries. Important institutions are available here such as schools, Mosque, School of Islamic science, Temple etc. Hindus and Muslims are living together in this village from log ago.

== Demographics ==
According to the 2011 Bangladesh census, Jathagram had 822 households and a population of 4,427.

== Education ==
'Jethagram High School' is at the middle of the village following education standard under Comilla Board. 'Jethagram Primary School' and 'Jethagram Hafizia Madrasha' is at the east and educating the villagers. There are a lot of mosques helping by the common roll of Islamic education.

== Etymology ==
Jethagram derived from 'Jetha'(Bengali: জেঠা) means uncle and 'gram'(Bengali: গ্রাম) means village in English. This village is well known for a lot of ponds. Earlier it was well known for betel leaf. Greater Jethagram included other villages - Jethagram, Shochiura, Deghar and Choarkuri.

== Gallery ==
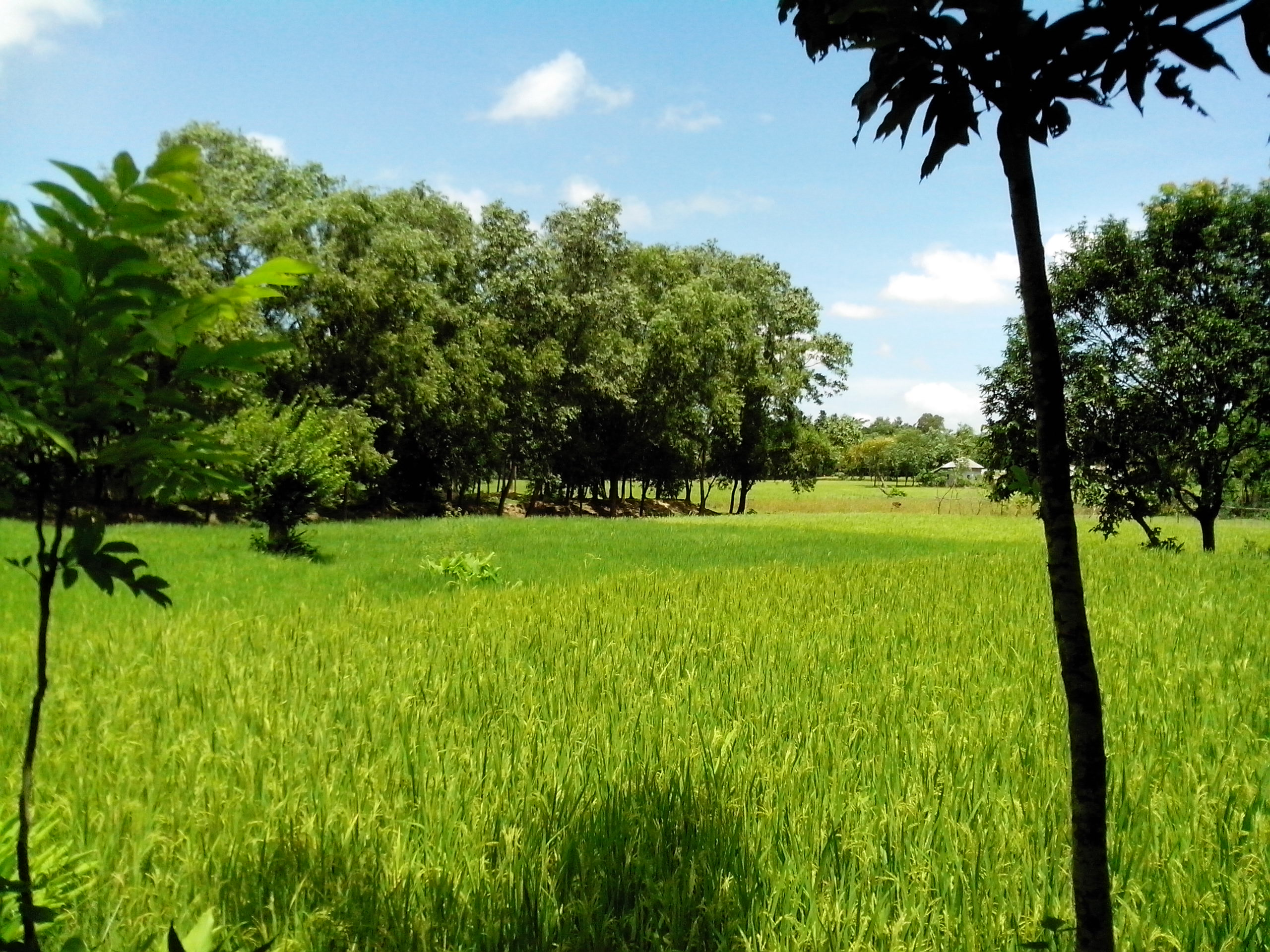
Beauty of nature

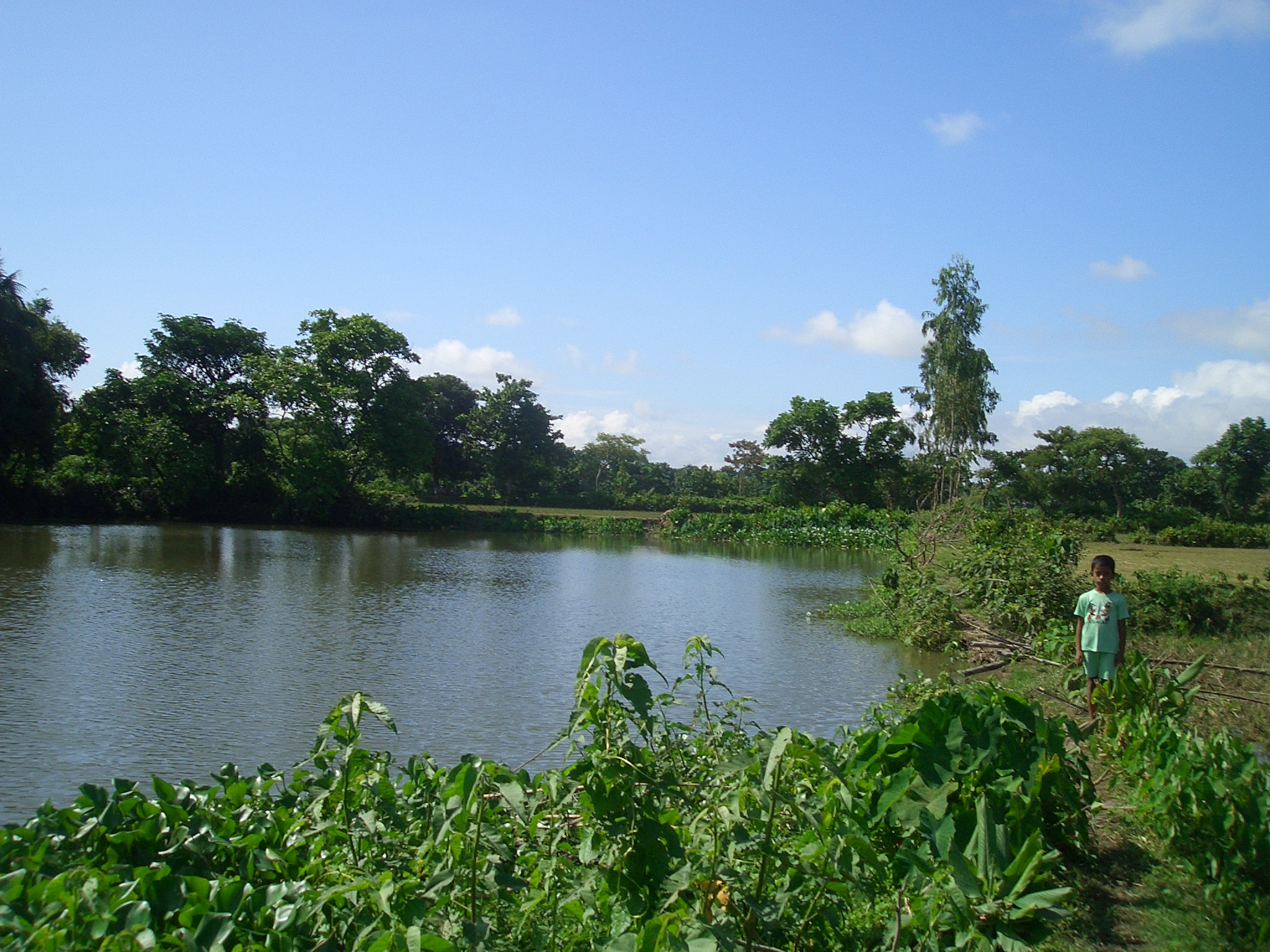
Choudhory Bari Pond
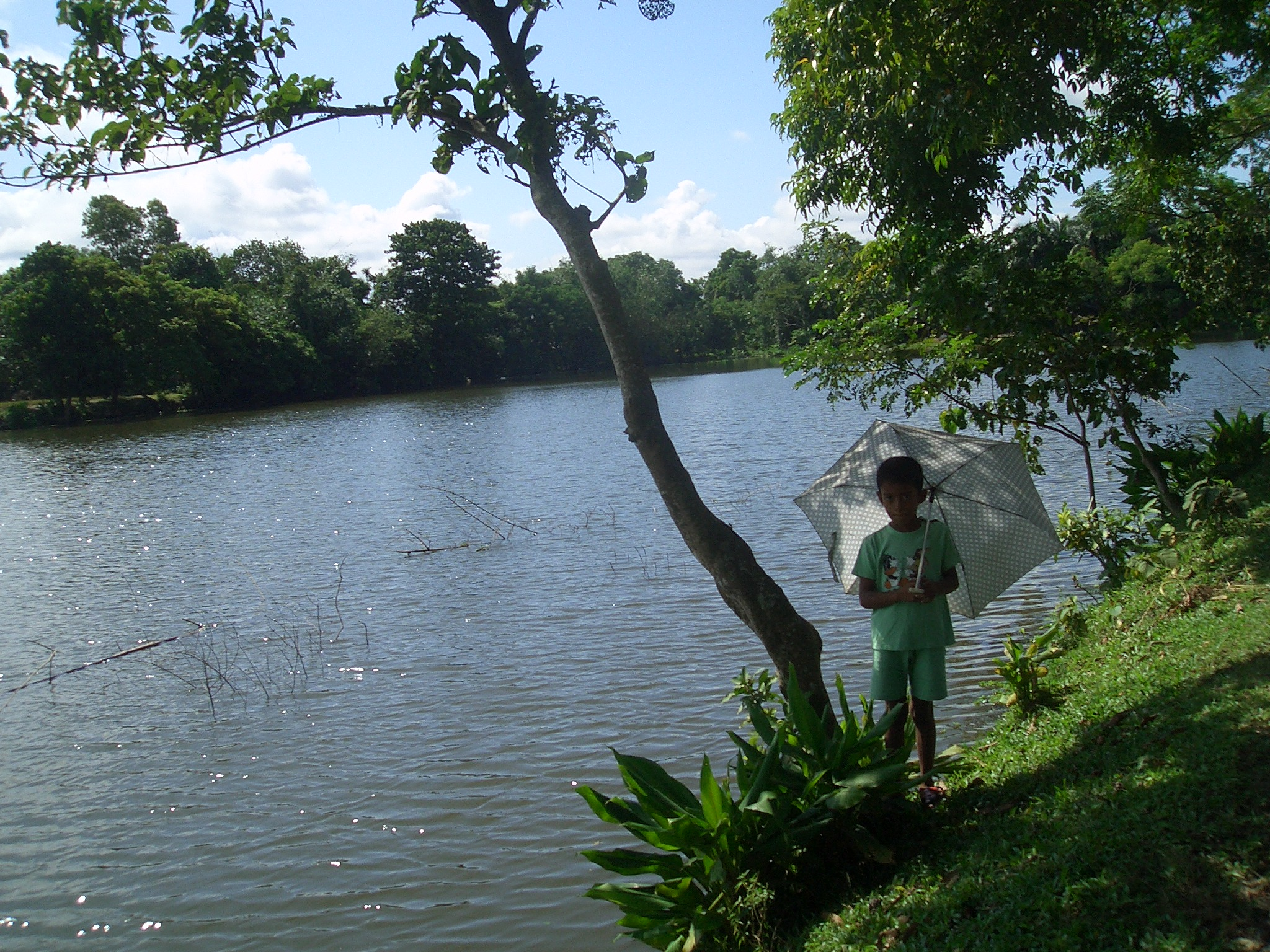
Kontor Deghee

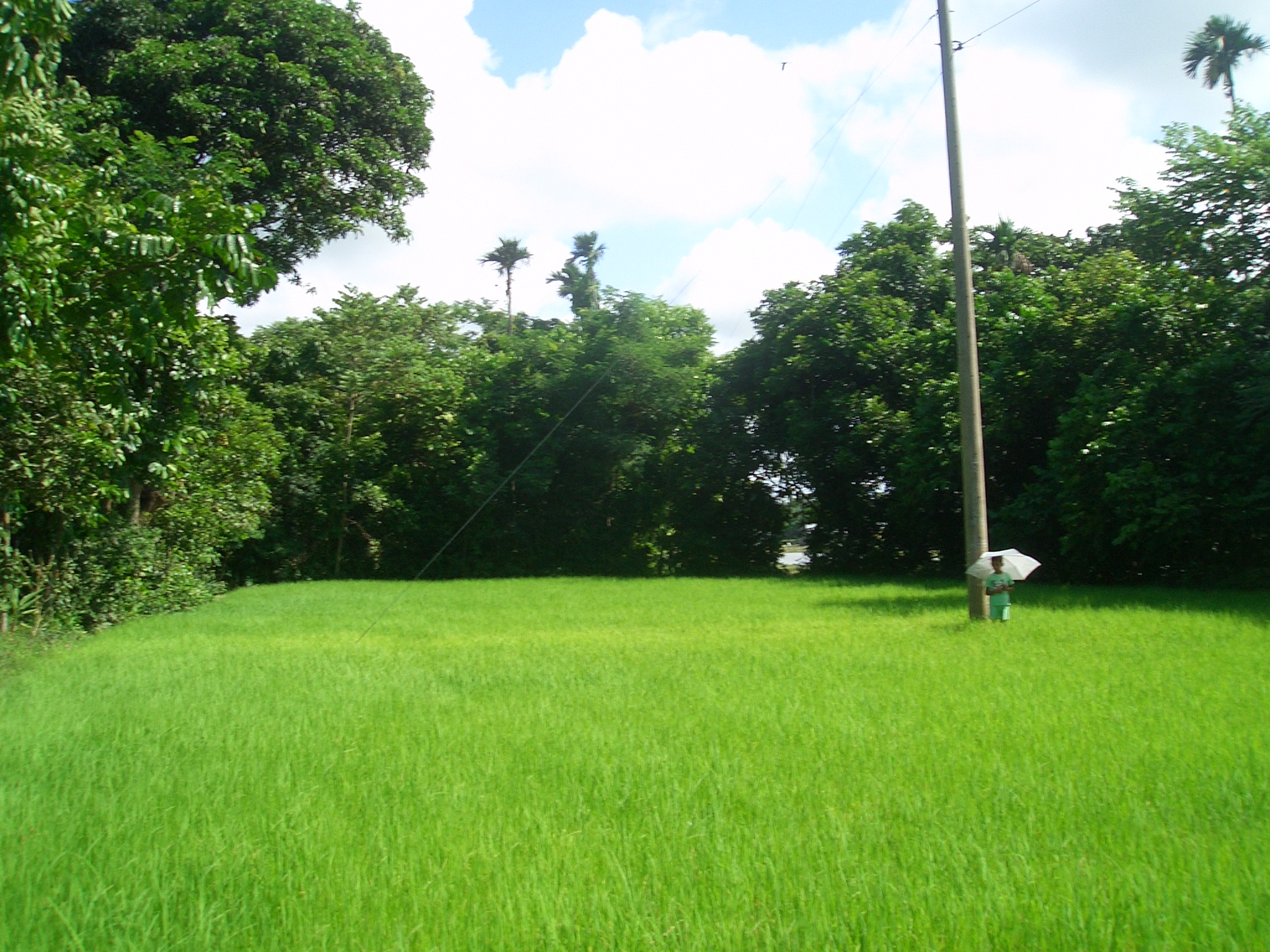
Paddy Seedlings

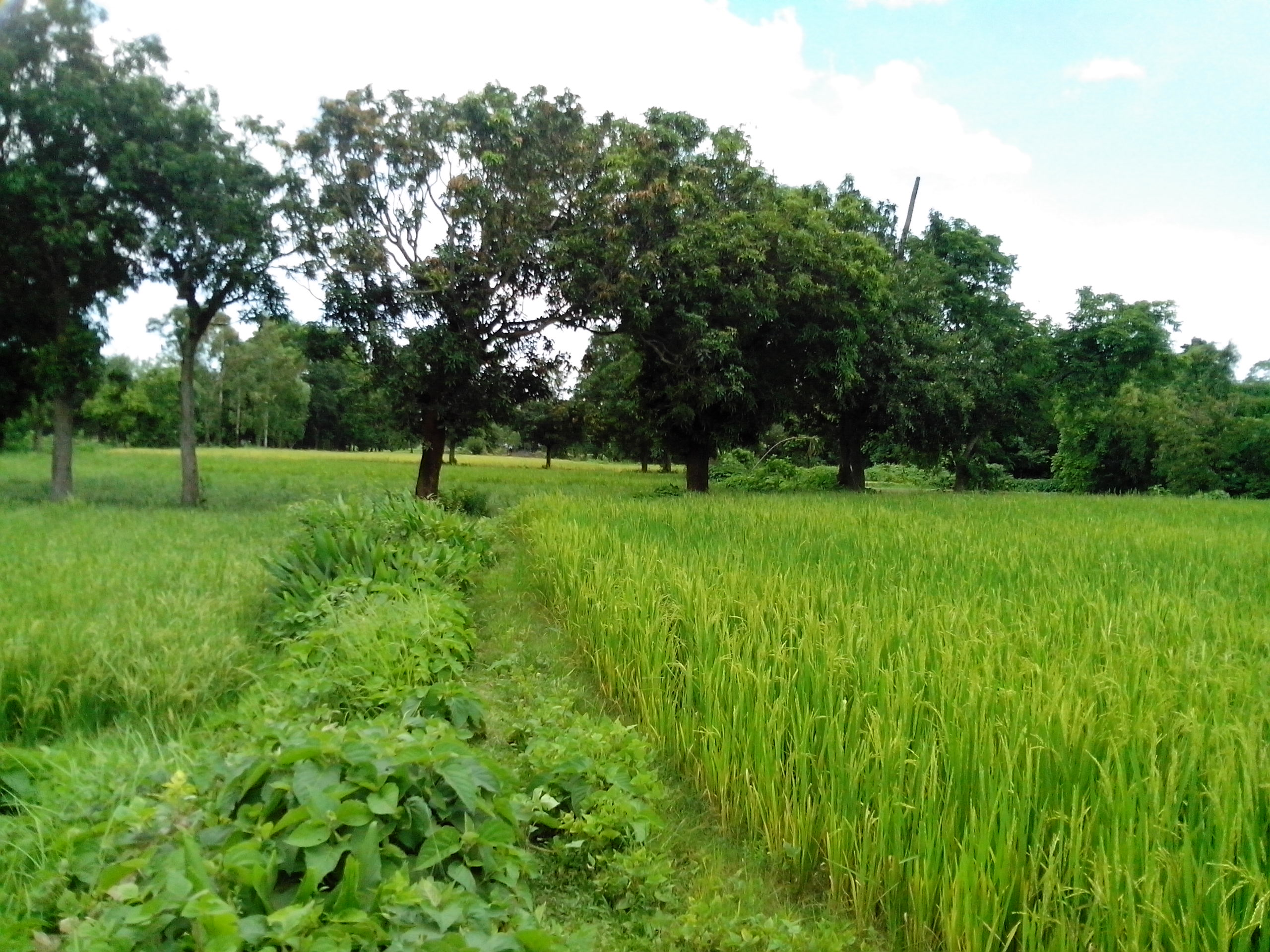
Mango orchard besides paddy field

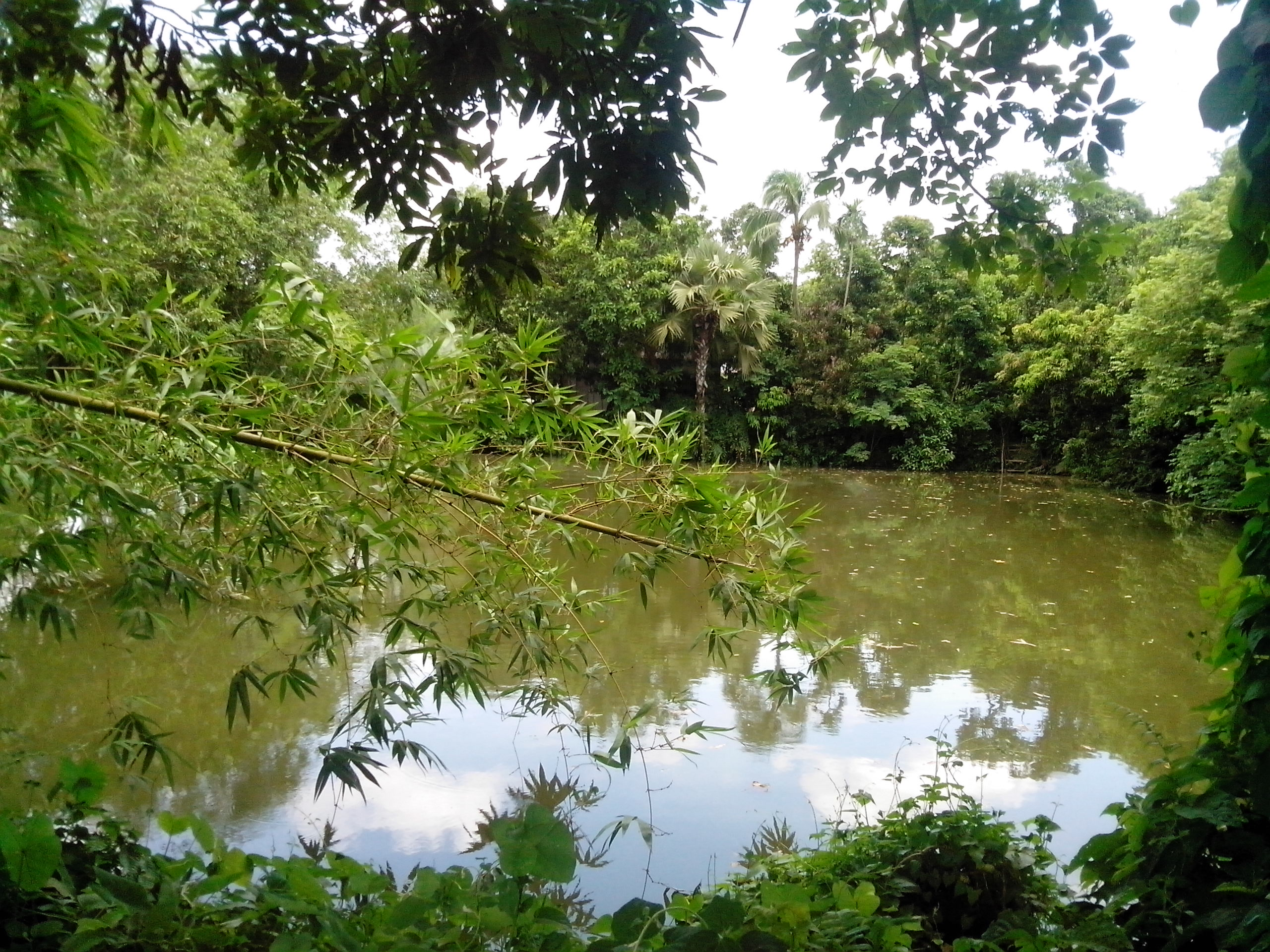
Shaheb Bari Pond

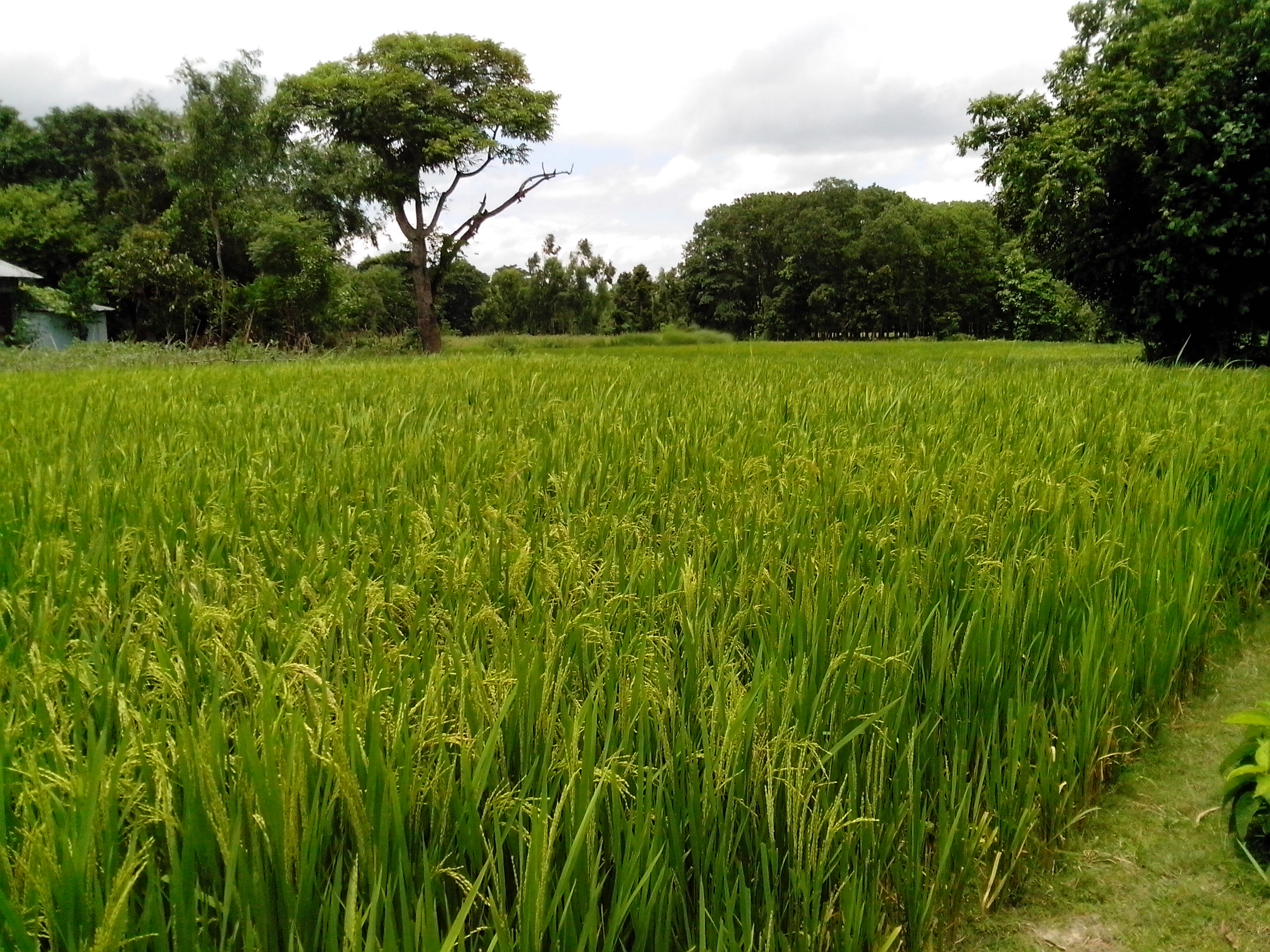
Golden paddy field

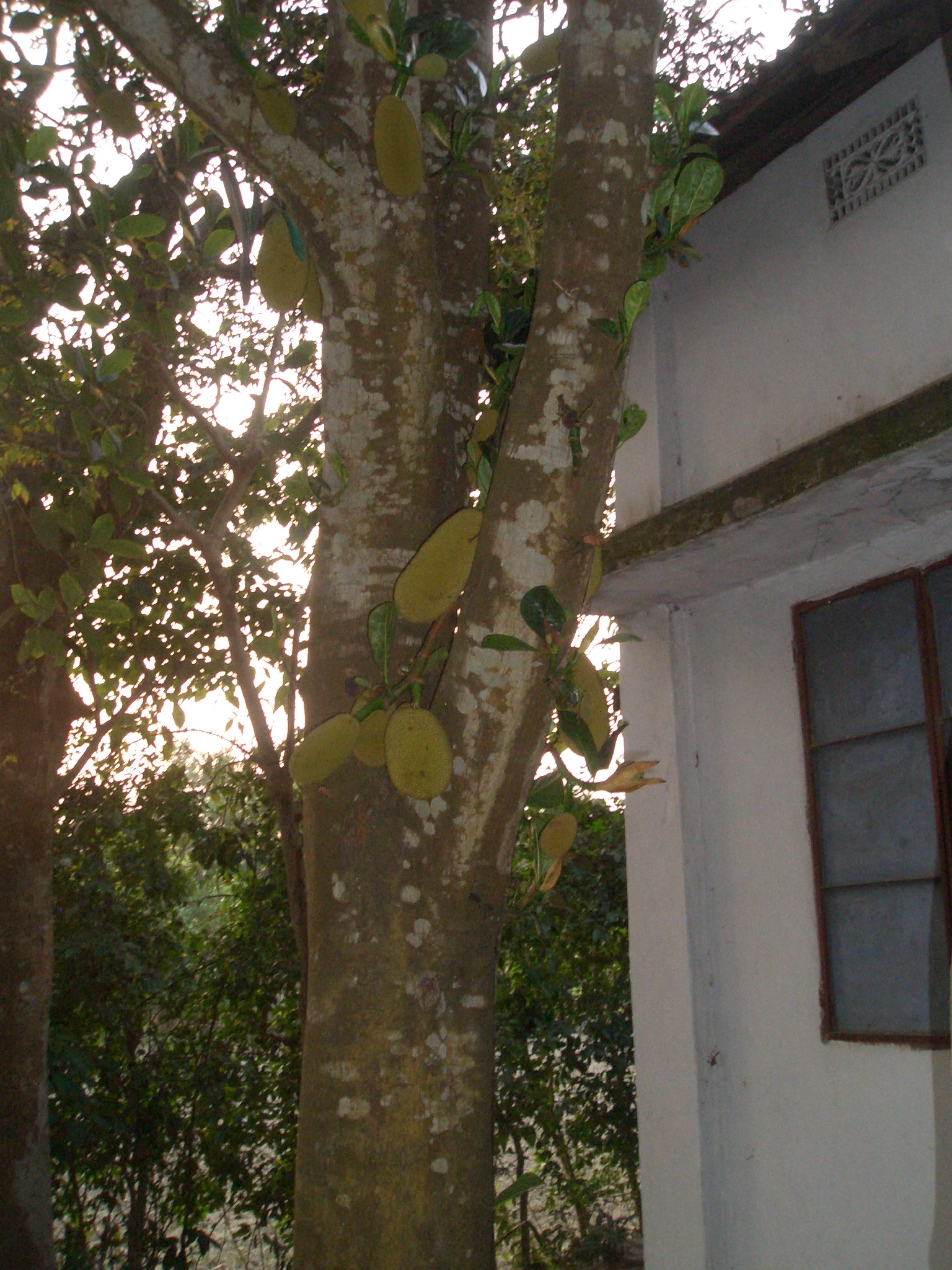
Jack-fruit

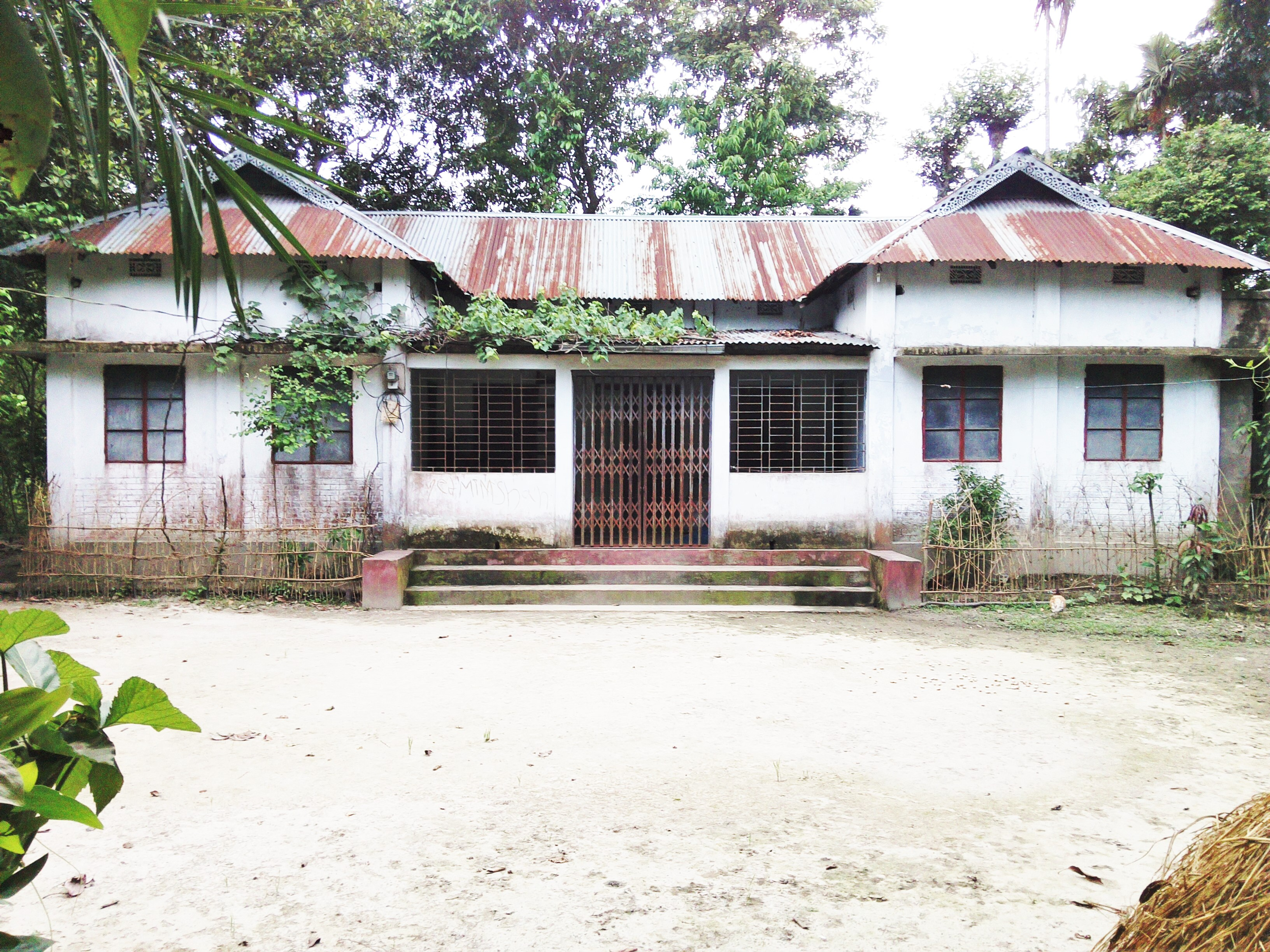
House structure of villagers
