= Montagu–Chelmsford Reforms =

1919 report for changes in British India

The Montagu–Chelmsford Reforms or more concisely the Mont–Ford Reforms, were introduced by the colonial government to introduce self-governing institutions gradually in British India. The reforms take their name from Edwin Montagu, the Secretary of State for India from 1917 to 1922, and Lord Chelmsford, the Viceroy of India between 1916 and 1921. The reforms were outlined in the Montagu–Chelmsford Report, prepared in 1918, and formed the basis of the Government of India Act 1919. The constitutional reforms were considered by Indian nationalists not to go far enough though British conservatives were critical of them. The important features of this act were that:

1. The Imperial Legislative Council was now to consist of two houses: the Central Legislative Assembly and the Council of state
2. The provinces were to follow the Dual Government System, or diarchy.

== Background ==
Edwin Montagu became Secretary of State for India in June 1917 after Austen Chamberlain had resigned over the capture of Kut by the Ottoman Empire in 1916 and the capture of an Indian army that was staged there. Montagu put before the British Cabinet a proposed statement regarding his intention to work towards the gradual development of free institutions in India with a view to ultimate self-government. Lord Curzon thought that Montagu laid too much emphasis on working towards self-government and suggested that he work towards increasing association of Indians in every branch of the administration and the gradual development of self-governing institutions with a view to the progressive realisation of responsible government in India as an integral part of the British Empire. The Cabinet approved the statement with Curzon's amendment incorporated in place of Montagu's original statement.

== Reforms ==
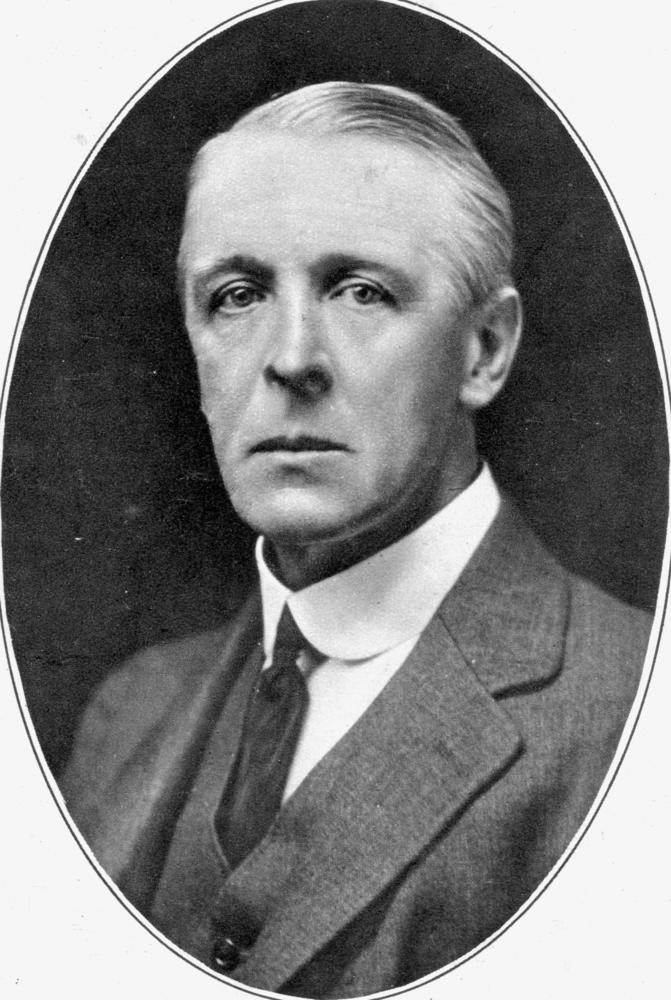
Lord Chelmsford was Viceroy of India.

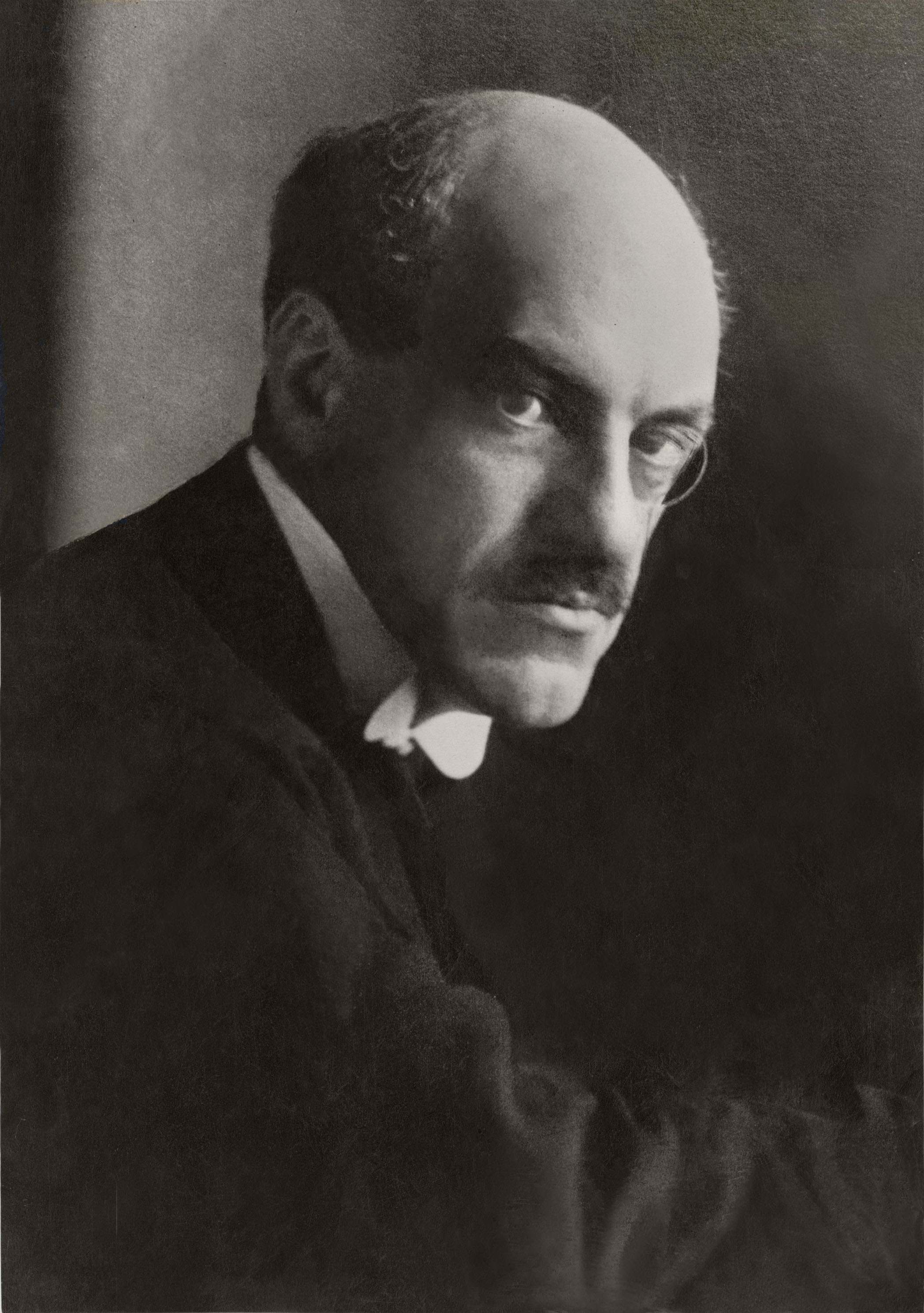
Edwin Samuel Montagu was Secretary of State for India

In late 1917, Montagu went to India to meet Lord Chelmsford, the Viceroy of India, and leaders of Indian community, to discuss the introduction of limited self-government to India, and the protection rights of minority communities. He drew up a report, with Bhupendra Nath Bose, Lord Donoghmore, William Duke and Charles Roberts.

The report went before the Cabinet on 24 May and 7 June 1918 and was embodied in the Government of India Act 1919. The reforms represented the maximum concessions the British were prepared to make at that time. The franchise was extended, and increased authority was given to central and provincial legislative councils, but the Viceroy remained responsible only to London.

The changes at the provincial level were very significant, as the provincial legislative councils contained a considerable majority of elected members. In a system called "diarchy", the nation-building departments of government were placed under ministers, who were individually responsible to the legislature. The departments that made up the "steel frame" of British rule were retained by executive councillors, who were nominated by the governor. They were often but not always British and were responsible to the governor. The Act of 1919 introduced diarchy to the provinces.

Accordingly, the rights of the central and provincial governments were divided in clear-cut terms. The central list included rights over defence, foreign affairs, telegraphs, railways, postal, foreign trade etc. The provincial list dealt with the affairs like health, sanitation, education, public work, irrigation, jail, police, justice, etc. The powers that were not included in the state list were vested in the hands of the central government. In case of any conflict between the "reserved" and "unreserved" powers of the State (the former included finance, police, revenue and publication of books, and the latter included health, sanitation and local-self government), the governor had the final say. In 1921, the "Diarchy" was installed in Bengal, Madras, Bombay, the United Provinces, the Central Provinces, the Punjab, Bihar and Orissa, and Assam; in 1932 it was extended to the North-West Frontier Province.

In 1921, another change that had been recommended by the report was carried out by elected local councils being set up in rural areas, and during the 1920s, urban municipal corporations were made more democratic and "Indianized".

The main provisions were the following:

1. The number of voters was increased.
2. The Secretary of State would control affairs relating to Government of India.
3. The Imperial Legislative Council would consist of two chambers: the Council of State and the Central Legislative Assembly.
4. The Imperial Legislative Council was empowered to enact laws on any matter for the whole of India.
5. The Viceroy was given powers to summon, prorogue, dissolve the chambers, and to promulgate ordinances.
6. The number of Indians in Viceroy's Executive Council would be three out of eight members.
7. Bicameral Provincial Legislative Councils were established.
8. There would be diarchy in the provinces:
  1. Reserved subjects would include finance, law and order, army and police.
  2. Transferred subjects would include public health, education, agriculture and local self-government.
9. Direct elections and an extension of the communal franchise would occur.
10. A council of princes was also set up with 108 members to allow princes to debate matters of importance, but it had no power, and some princes failed even to attend what was little more than a "talking shop."

== Reception in India ==
Many Indians had fought for the British in World War I, and they expected much greater concessions. The Indian National Congress and the Muslim League had recently come together demanding self-rule. The 1919 reforms did not satisfy political demands in India. Colonial authorities repressed opposition throughout India, and restrictions on the press and on movement were re-enacted through the Rowlatt Acts introduced in 1919. The measures were rammed through the Legislative Council with the unanimous opposition of the Indian members. Several members of the council, including Muhammad Ali Jinnah, resigned in protest. The measures were widely seen throughout India as a betrayal of the strong support given by the population for the British war effort.

Mahatma Gandhi launched a nationwide protest against the Rowlatt Acts with the strongest level of protest in the Punjab. The situation worsened in Amritsar in April 1919, when General Reginald Dyer ordered his troops to open fire on demonstrators who were hemmed into a walled compound. Estimates of deaths range from 379 to 1500 or more and 1200 people injured, 192 of them seriously. Montagu ordered an inquiry into the events at Amritsar by Lord Hunter. The Hunter Inquiry recommended the dismissal of Dyer, who had commanded the troops, which led to Dyer's sacking. Many British citizens supported Dyer, whom they considered had received unfair treatment from the Hunter Inquiry. The conservative Morning Post newspaper collected a subscription of £26,000 for Dyer, and Sir Edward Carson moved a censure motion on Montagu that was nearly successful. Montagu was saved largely because of a strong speech in his defence by Winston Churchill.

The Amritsar massacre further inflamed Indian nationalist sentiment and ended, or at least reduced, the initial response of reluctant co-operation. At the grassroots level, many young Indians wanted faster progress towards Indian independence and were disappointed by their lack of advancement as Britons returned to their former positions in the administration. At the Indian National Congress annual session in September 1920, delegates supported Gandhi's proposal of swaraj, or self-rule, preferably within the British Empire but out of it if necessary. The proposal was to be implemented through a policy of non-cooperation with British rule and so Congress did not field candidates in the first elections, held in 1921 under the Montagu–Chelmsford Reforms.

== Review ==
The Montagu-Chelmsford Report stated that there should be a review after 10 years. Sir John Simon headed the Simon Commission, the committee that was responsible for the review, and recommended further constitutional change. Three round table conferences were held in London in 1930, 1931 and 1932 with representation of the major interests. Gandhi attended the 1931 Round Table Conferences after negotiations with the British government. The major disagreement between the Indian National Congress and the government was separate electorates for each community, which Congress opposed but were retained in Ramsay MacDonald's Communal Award. A new Government of India Act 1935 was passed and continued the move towards self-government that had been first made in the Montagu–Chelmsford Report.
