= Gokarna, Bangladesh =

Gokarna গোকর্ণ
- Village
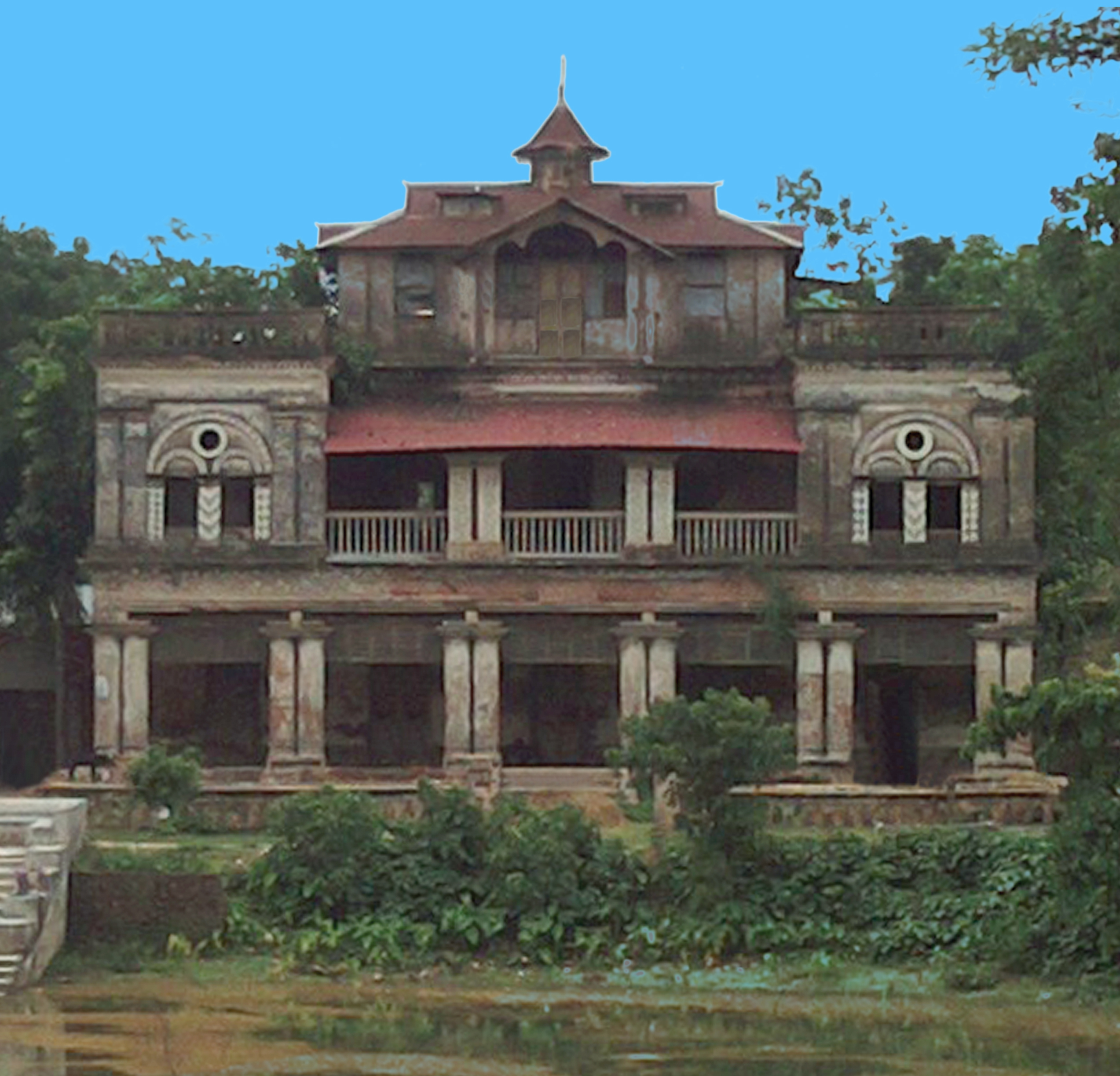
- Nawab Sir Syed Shamsul Huda Complex, Gokarna Nasirnagar Upazila at Brahmanbaria District

- Location in Bangladesh
- Coordinates: 24°6.2′N 91°3.8′E
- Country: Bangladesh
- Division: Chittagong Division
- District: Brahmanbaria District
- Time zone: UTC+6 (BST)
- Website: bangladesh.gov.bd/maps/images/brahmanbaria/Nasirnagar.gif

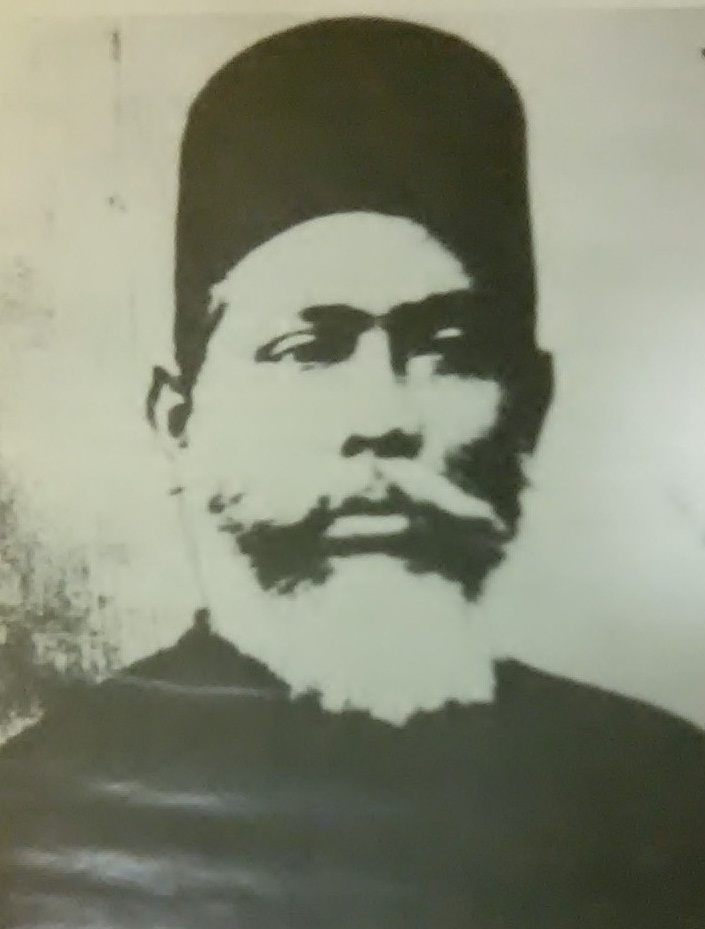
Nawaab Syed Shamsul Huda KCIE

Gokarna stands on the bank of Haral River in Bangladesh which connected with Titas River. This village was historically considered as a remote area; prior to the modern era of road travel its inhabitants relied on boats. Many highly respected people were born in Gokarna, including Nawaab Syed Shamsul Huda KCIE born in 1862 at this village. He became the first Muslim president of the Imperial Legislative Council in 1921. In the past, people traveled from Gokarna to Dhaka and Calcutta by river.

== Etymology ==
Gokarna means Cow's Ear. It is so named due to the ear-shaped confluence of Haral River connected with Titas River.

== Geography ==
Gokarna (Bengali: গোকর্ণ) is a village of Brahmanbaria Sadar Upazila at Brahmanbaria District in the Division of Chittagong, Bangladesh. Gokarna is located at 24°08'31.7"N 91°12'19.3"E. This is the 10th Union Council of Nasirnagar Upazila.

=== Haors and beels ===
During the rainy season Haral River links with Titas River which connects with Meghna River. Haral River blows from the east to the west at the south of the village. She looks big when over flooded and three rivers water joint together. After water dries-up, the farmer cultivates on the alluvial laid vast field and river bed becomes green Haor. Water divides in Beels like Shaapla, Balinga, Chilauri, Hasania, Tarullah, Puillya, Biduba, Hakhati, Kudal-kati, Ladra, Khujla, Haral etc. This land is called Akashi Maath or Sky Touched Land).

The area experiences a temperate climate with four distinct seasons. Recent infrastructure developments in the town include the expansion of education, healthcare, electrical grids, and telecommunication networks.

== Demographics ==
According to the 2011 Bangladesh census, Gokarna had 1,433 households and a population of 7,218.

== Administration ==
Gokarna Union is formed by the other village of Jethagram, Shochiura, Deghar, Pathanishar, Chotipara, Brahmanshashon, Nurpur, and Lahajura.

== Communication ==
Sarail Upazila to Nasirnagar Upazila Dam Road crossed spirally the Haor and life for the villagers made easier to communicate with Brahmanbaria and Dhaka.

== Education ==
Nawaab Syed Shamsul Huda founded this high school in his ancestral property named Gokarna Syed Waliuallah High School in 1915 which bestowed on the name of his same aged uncle Syed Waliullah. After that it is named Gokarna Syed Waliullah High School And College.
