= Hammick reaction =

Chemical reaction

Named after	Dalziel Hammick
Reaction type	Coupling reaction

The Hammick reaction, named after Dalziel Hammick, is a chemical reaction in which the thermal decarboxylation of α-picolinic (or related) acids in the presence of carbonyl compounds forms 2-pyridyl-carbinols.

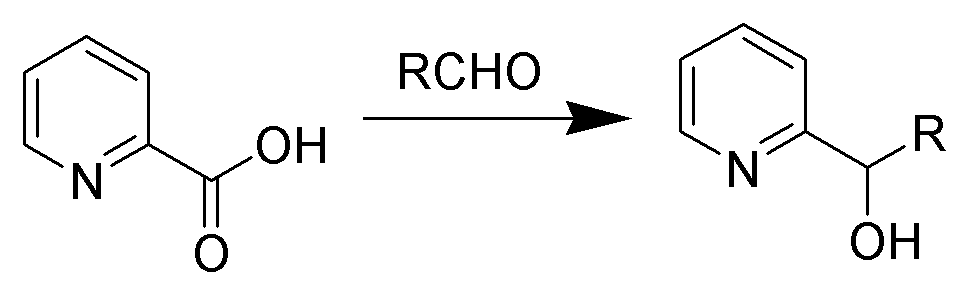
The Hammick reaction

Using p-cymene as solvent has been shown to increase yields.

== Reaction mechanism ==
Upon heating α-picolinic acid will spontaneously decarboxylate forming the so-called 'Hammick Intermediate' (3). This was initially thought to be an aromatic ylide, but is now believed to be a carbene In the presence of a strong electrophile, such as an aldehyde or ketone, this species will undergo nucleophilic attack faster than proton transfer. After nucleophilic attack intramolecular proton transfer yields the desired carbinol (6).

The mechanism of the Hammick reaction

The scope of the reaction is effectively limited to decarboxylating acids where the carboxyl group is α to the nitrogen, (reactivity has been reported when the acids are located elsewhere on the molecule but with low yields) thus suitable substrates are limited to the derivatives of α-picolinic acid including the α-carboxylic acids of quinoline and isoquinoline.

== See also ==
- Quinonoid zwitterion
