= Murray Hammick =

Indian civil servant (1854–1936)

Sir Murray Hammick KCSI CIE

Member of the Council of State (India)
- In office 16 August 1915 – 7 November 1921
- Governors-General: The Viscount Chelmsford; The Marquess of Reading

Governor of Madras (Acting)
- In office 30 March 1912 – 30 October 1912
- Governor-General: The Lord Hardinge of Penshurst
- Preceded by: The Lord Carmichael
- Succeeded by: The Lord Pentland

Member of the Executive Council of the Governor of Madras
- In office 1908–1912
- Governor: The Lord Wenlock, The Lord Carmichael

Personal details
- Born: Murray Love Hammick; 11 May 1854 Tavistock, Devon, England
- Died: 4 March 1936 (aged 81) United Kingdom
- Spouse: Ada Constance Searle (after 1883)
- Parents: Sir St Vincent Hammick, 2nd Baronet (father); Mary Alexander (mother)

Sir Murray Love Hammick, KCSI CIE (11 May 1854 – 4 March 1936) was an Indian civil servant and administrator who acted as the Governor of Madras from 30 March 1912 to 30 October 1912.

== Early life ==
Murray Hammick was born on 11 May 1854 to Rev. Sir St Vincent Hammick, 2nd Baronet and Mary Alexander. Among his siblings were Sir St Vincent Hammick, 3rd Baronet and the Ven. Ernest Austen Hammick, Archdeacon of Durban and of Zululand.

His paternal grandparents were Sir Stephen Hammick, 1st Baronet, a noted surgeon and physician, and Frances Turquand (a daughter of London merchant Peter Turquand). His maternal grandparents were Robert Alexander and Grace (née Blacker) Alexander.

== Career ==
Murray Hammick graduated from the Fell King's College and joined the Indian Civil Service after clearing the exams in 1875. He arrived in India on 18 December 1877 and served as Sub Collector in the Madras President and as Assistant Commissioner of Coorg. He served as the Inspector-General of police of Madras from 1894 to 1906 when he was appointed Chief Secretary to the Madras government. In 1908, Hammick was appointed to the Executive Council of the Governor of Madras and served from 1908 to March 1912, when he was chosen to act as the Governor of Madras until the arrival of the governor-designate John Sinclair, 1st Baron Pentland in October 1912.

=== Governor of Madras ===
Hammick acted as the Governor of Madras from 30 March 1912 to 30 October 1912.

=== Later career ===
In 1913, Hammick was appointed member of the Royal Commission to inquire into the Civil Services in India. In 1915, Hammick was appointed to the Council of State and served as a member from 1915 to 1922.

Hammick was also a prominent freemason and was the provincial grandmaster of the District Grand Lodge of Madras from 1910 to 1914.

== Personal life ==
On 11 December 1883, Hammick married Ada Constance Searle, daughter of Major-General Arthur Thaddeus Searle and Lucy Helen Byne. The couple had two sons and three daughters, including:

- Lorna Mary Hammick (1884–1956), who married Norman Dalrymple Shaw, son of J. C. Shaw, in 1911.
- Dorothy Constance Hammick (1886–1988), who married Col. Alexander Charles Broughton Mackinnon, son of Col. Walter Carr Mackinnon, in 1921.
- Henry Alexander Hammick (1890–1968), the Chief Engineer of the Iraq Petroleum Company and co-inventor of the HAMEL PLUTO D-Day pipeline system; he married Mabel Emily Pilditch, daughter of Sir Philip Pilditch, 1st Baronet and Emily Mary Lewis, in 1919.
- Lucy Mabel Hammick (1893–1975), who was appointed Member, Order of the British Empire in 1920.
- John Murray Hammick (1901–1902), who died as an infant in India.

Sir Murray died in England on 4 March 1936.

=== Honours ===
Hammick was appointed a Companion of the Order of the Indian Empire (CIE) in November 1901. He was appointed a Companion of the Order of the Star of India (CSI) in 1907 and raised to a Knight Commander (KCSI) of the order in 1911.

== Works ==
- Murray Hammick (1930). Rural India: land, power, and society under British rule.
- Murray Hammick; Mark Wills (1932). Historical sketches of the south of India: in an attempt to trace the history of Mysoor from the origin of the Hindoo Government of that state to the extinction of the Mohammedan dynasty in 1799, Volume 2: Historical Sketches of the South of India: In an Attempt to Trace the History of Mysoor from the Origin of the Hindoo Government of that State to the Extinction of the Mohammedan Dynasty in 1799.

| Preceded by | Inspector-General of police (Madras Presidency); 1894-1906 | Succeeded by |
| Preceded by | Chief Secretary to the Government of Madras; 1906–1908 | Succeeded by |
| Preceded by | Member of the Executive Council of the Governor of Madras; 1908–1912 | Succeeded by |
| Preceded by The Lord Carmichael | Governor of Madras; 30 March 1912 – 30 October 1912 | Succeeded by The Lord Pentland |
| Preceded by | Member of the Council of State (India); 15 August 1915 – 7 November 1921 | Succeeded by |
