= Alexander Hammick =

Rear-Admiral Alexander Hammick
- Born: Alexander Robert Hammick; 16 February 1887
- Died: 1969 (aged 81–82)
- Military career
- Allegiance: United Kingdom
- Branch: Royal Navy
- Rank: Rear-Admiral
- Commands: HMS Sussex
- Conflicts: World War I World War II

Rear-Admiral Alexander Robert Hammick (16 February 1887 – 1969) was a Royal Navy officer who served during the First and Second World Wars.

Hammock joined the Royal Navy and was January 1903 posted as naval cadet to the armoured cruiser HMS Hogue, serving in the Channel Squadron. He was promoted to the rank of lieutenant on 31 December 1908, and to commander on 30 June 1922.

He commanded the heavy cruiser Sussex in 1938–1940 and then served as chief of staff to the Flag Officer-in-charge, Greenock in 1940–1942.

== Bibliography ==
- Halpern, Paul G., ed. (2016). The Mediterranean Fleet, 1930–1939. Publications of the Navy Records Society. Vol. 163. London: Routledge for the Navy Records Society. ISBN 978-1-4724-7597-8.
