= William Duke (civil servant) =

Scottish civil servant

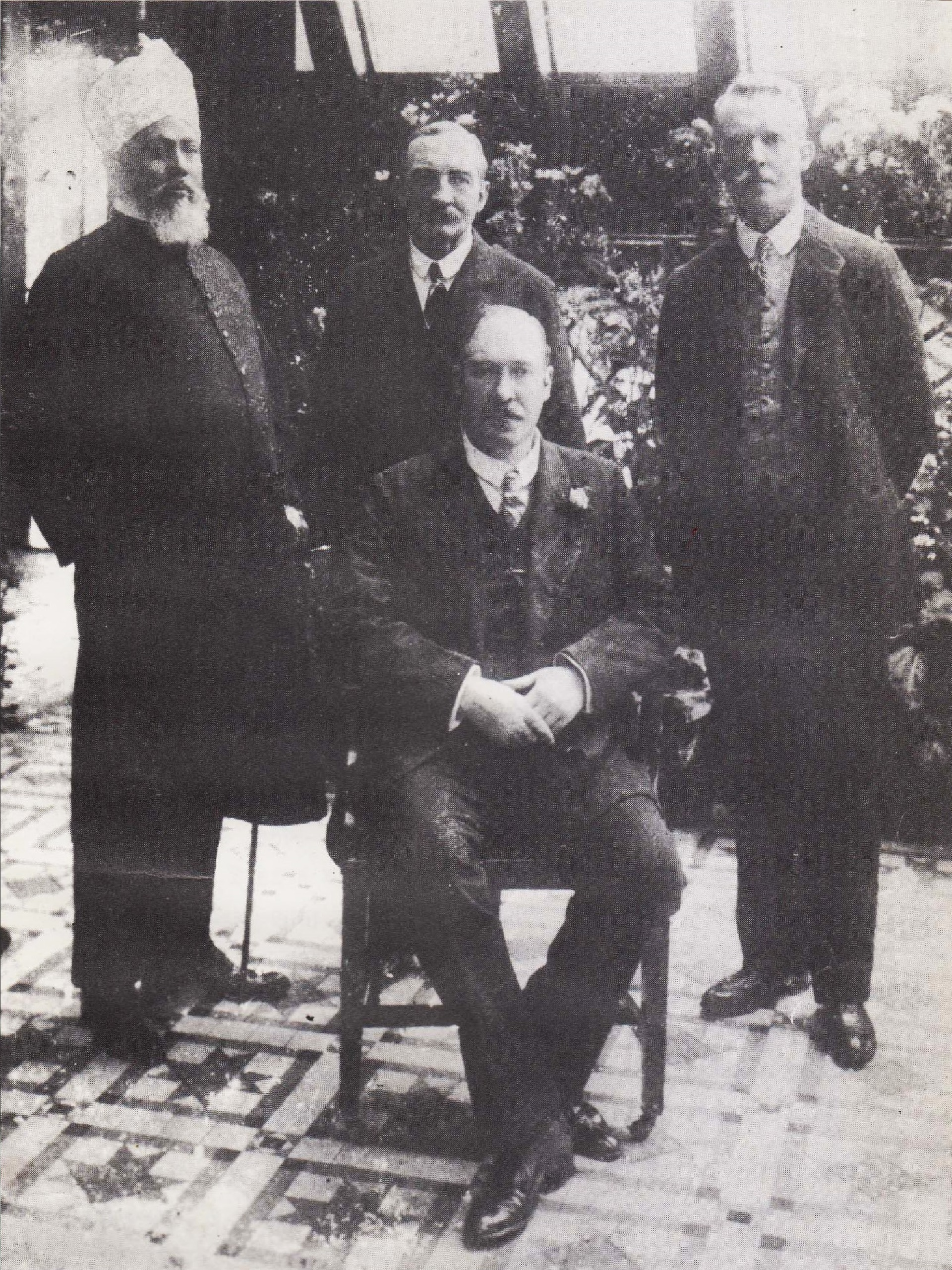
Executive Council (1912-1917):Thomas Gibson-Carmichael on the chair and standing from the left Nawaab Syed Shamsul Huda, Frederick William Duke and P C Lion Chitty

Sir Frederick William Duke GCIE KCSI (8 December 1863 – 11 June 1924) was a Scottish civil servant of the Indian Civil Service and formulated the Duke Memorandum during the period of constitutional reform in India.

== Early life ==
William Duke was born in Arbroath, Scotland. He was the eldest son of Rev. William Duke, who for 50 years was the parish minister of St Vigeans, Forfarshire, and Annie Leonard. He studied at Arbroath High School and then to Wren and Gurney to be coached for the competitive entrance exams for the Indian Civil Service (British India) which he passed. A position in the Indian Civil Service at that time was highly regarded. He then spent two years at University College London.

== Career ==
In 1884, he was posted to Bengal and spent twenty four years serving in the districts in various positions. From 1897 to 1902 he served as magistrate and chairman of the municipality at Howrah near Calcutta. He was promoted to commissioner of Orissa in 1905, eventually being appointed the chief secretary of Bengal in 1909. In 1910 Duke became a member of the newly created executive council for Bengal. Duke was the last lieutenant-governor of Bengal as the province was then being re-organised due to the reversal of the 1905 Bengal partition, with the capital of India being relocated from Calcutta to New Delhi. Bengal also became a full-fledged Governorship at this time and Sir Thomas David Gibson Carmichael, was transferred from Madras to Governor of Bengal. Duke remained with him as his senior member of Council until November 1914, at which time he retired and was appointed as a member of the Council of India. Duke joined a study group of India Office members and the Round Table Group founded by Lionel George Curtis which had a lot of influence on Indian constitutional reforms, In this capacity he formulated the "Duke Memorandum" in which he devised a practical scheme of reforms relating to how the Indians could implement responsible government by means of dyarchy Duke's long experience in India had lent authority to the Round table reform schemes and his memorandum formed the basis of the Montagu–Chelmsford Reforms and the subsequent Government of India Act 1919. After the 1919 act was given royal assent the Chamber of Princes was established in 1920 to provide a forum for the rulers of the princely states to have a say in the government of British India. Duke was the chairman of the committee that was ultimately responsible for bringing the chamber into existence.

When Sir Thomas Holderness retired in 1920, Montagu made Duke the Permanent Under-Secretary of State, a position he held until his death in 1924.

== Personal life ==
Duke married in 1889 Mary Eliza Addison-Scott, daughter of James Addison-Scott. They had two sons: Leonard Gordon Duke (1890–1971), a civil servant known as a collector of drawings; and William Falcon Duke; and a daughter, Marjorie Clemence, who married Sir Iltyd Nicholl Clayton. The sons were

== Honours ==
- Companion of the Order of the Star of India (CSI) – 1910 Birthday Honours
- Knight Commander of the Order of the Star of India (KCSI) – 1915 Birthday Honours
- Knight Grand Commander of the Order of the Indian Empire (GCIE) – 1918 Birthday Honours
