= Georgina Hammick =

British author (1939–2023)

- Born: Georgina Heyman; 24 May 1939; Aldershot, Hampshire, England
- Died: 8 January 2023 (aged 83); London, England
- Education: Académie Julian, Salisbury Art School
- Occupation: Author
- Spouse: Charles Hammick (1961– 1967)
- Children: Tom Hammick Kate Hammick Rose Hammick
- Writing career
- Language: English
- Period: 1970–2003
- Genres: Fiction, poetry
- Notable awards: Shortlisted for Whitbread Award for first novel, 1996 Royal Society of Literature fellow, 2001 Society of Authors' Travel Scholarship

Georgina Hammick (née Heyman; 24 May 1939 – 8 January 2023) was a British author, known for writing People for Lunch, Spoilt, The Arizona Game (which was shortlisted for the Whitbread First Novel Award), and Green Man Running. She was elected as a Fellow of the Royal Society of Literature in 2001.

== Life and career ==
=== Education ===
Daughter of a professional soldier, Hammick was born Georgina Heyman in Aldershot, Hampshire. She was one of a pair of identical twins: her sister Amanda Vesey is a well-known children's writer and illustrator. Her early life was somewhat peripatetic, and she lived, and was 'semi-educated', in England, America and Kenya. She began training as a painter, attending the Academie Julian in Paris and Salisbury Art School, but eventually chose to make her career as a writer. She taught in various schools, both state and private, before marrying Charles Hammick, a soldier, in 1961. Together they had three children (one of whom is the painter Tom Hammick), and also brought up his two children from a previous marriage. Her husband left the army in 1964 and became a company secretary, but after suffering a near-fatal heart-attack in 1967 he was obliged to find other employment. The following year the Hammicks set up a bookshop in Farnham. Hammick's was the first bookshop to use a computerised ordering system, and soon expanded to become a small independent chain.

=== Works ===
Hammick began publishing poetry in magazines and anthologies in the 1970s, and was one of five poets whose work appeared in A Poetry Quintet (1976). Her poems were singled out by one reviewer as 'clean, unpretending, to the point, and unusually assured in their restraint'. For many years she took part in the Poetry Society's 'Poet in Schools' scheme, and she contributed to Gavin Ewart's anthology of 'Other People's Clerihetos' (1983). Once her children had 'more or less' grown up, she began writing short stories.

'People for Lunch' won the Stand Magazine Short Story Competition in 1985, and became the title-story of her first volume, which was published by Methuen in 1987 to enormously enthusiastic reviews. The literary critic Kate Kellaway wrote that 'if ever there were a sympathetic, bittersweet tale for Christmas, or for anyone flinching at the prospect of entertaining at any time of year, the title story in this best-selling debut collection is it.'

Her second volume of short stories Spoilt was published in 1992 by Chatto and Windus. Her stories are distinguished by unobtrusive craftsmanship, and the quest for the exact word, which is a hallmark of her work, is reflected in 'The Dying Room'. This story appeared in 'That Glimpse of Truth: The 100 Finest Short Stories Ever Written.' Hermione Lee wrote in her review, 'Georgina Hammick made a dazzling debut in 1987 with People for Lunch, and it's good to see her going on in the same vein: these are funny, observant, cleverly structured stories about humiliation, death, loss of illusions, betrayal, remorse, and other everyday matters.'

Her considerable reputation rested upon these two volumes, the stories of which appeared in numerous magazines and anthologies (including The Penguin Book of Modern Women's Short Stories, The Penguin Book of the Contemporary British Short Story, and several volumes of the annual Best Short Stories), and have frequently been broadcast on BBC radio.

Widely anthologized herself, Hammick also edited an anthology, The Virago Book of Love and Loss (1992), which includes a number of influences and affinities—Elizabeth Bowen, Sylvia Townsend Warner, Elizabeth Taylor, Alice Munro.

In her novels The Arizona Game (1996) and Green Man Running (2002), she explored emotional terrain with acuity and an ironic wit which illuminates the dark corners of relationships. Her faithfulness to language and shades of meaning is always evident.

For several years Hammick served as one of the judges of the Ackerley Prize.

Hammick died on 8 January 2023 at her home in Dulwich, London. Her obituary, written by Tessa Hadley, described Hammick as a writer who "gave fine-tuned expression to her moment in English culture, writing with wit and insight about class and sexual politics and change."
