= Dalziel Hammick =

English organic chemist

- Born: Dalziel Llewellyn Hammick; 8 March 1887
- Died: 17 October 1966 (aged 79)
- Education: Magdalen College, Oxford
- Known for: Hammick reaction
- Awards: Fellow of the Royal Society
- Scientific career
- Workplaces: University of Oxford

Dalziel Llewellyn Hammick FRS (8 March 1887, West Norwood, London, England – 17 October 1966) was an English research chemist. His major work was in synthetic organic chemistry. Along with Walter Illingworth he promulgated the Hammick-Illingworth rule, which predicts the order of substitution in benzene derivatives. He also developed the Hammick reaction which generates ortho-substituted pyridines.

== Early life ==
The son of L. S. H. Hammick, Dalziel Hammick was educated at Whitgift School, Magdalen College, Oxford (where he was a demy), and at the Ludwig-Maximilians-Universität München. He graduated Bachelor of Arts degree in Natural Sciences in 1910 and MA in 1921.

At Oxford, he was a Cadet in the university's Officers' Training Corps, and in July 1911, he was commissioned as a second lieutenant for service with the Gresham's School OTC.

== Career ==
After some ten years as a schoolmaster at Gresham's and Winchester, in 1920 Hammick was elected to a fellowship of Oriel College, Oxford, where he remained until his death in 1966. For most of his time at Oriel, he was also a lecturer in natural sciences at Corpus Christi College.

His early research was on inorganic substances. He studied sulphur and its compounds and suggested structures for liquid and plastic sulphur. In 1922, he showed that the polymer polyoxymethylene results from the sublimation of trioxymethylene. It was not until the 1960s that this polymer was to be used commercially.

He also translated scientific books from French into English.

=== Career summary ===
- 1906 – 1910: Magdalen College, Oxford (demy) (BA 1910)
- 1909 – 1910: Ludwig-Maximilians-Universität München
- 1910 – 1918: Assistant Master at Gresham's School
- 1918 – 1920: Assistant Master at Winchester College
- 1920 – 1966: Fellow of Oriel College, Oxford
- 1921 – 1958: Lecturer in natural sciences, Corpus Christi College, Oxford

== Publications ==
- An Introduction to Organic Chemistry by Dalziel Llewellyn Hammick (London, Bell, 1921)
- Atoms, by Jean Perrin, translated by Dalziel Llewellyn Hammick (London, Constable, 1916, reprinted Ox Bow Press 1990) ISBN 0-918024-78-1
- numerous papers in the Journal of the Chemical Society and the Journal of the American Chemical Society

== Private life ==
Hammick married and had a son and two daughters. The family moved into The Grey Cottage, Old Road, Headington, near Oxford, in 1923, which was also the year of the birth of Hammick's younger daughter, Judith. He later adopted his grandson Anthony, Judith's son.

== Awards and honours ==
His work was honoured by election as a Fellow of the Royal Society in 1952.
