= Thomas Gibson-Carmichael, 1st Baron Carmichael =

Scottish politician and colonial administrator (1859–1926)

The Right Honourable The Lord Carmichael GCSI GCIE KCMG DL FRSE

Governor of Victoria
- In office 27 July 1908 – 19 May 1911
- Monarchs: Edward VII (1908–10); George V (1910–11)
- Governors General: Henry Northcote, 1st Baron Northcote (1908); William Ward, 2nd Earl of Dudley (1908–11)
- Premier: Sir Thomas Bent (1908–09); John Murray (1909–11)
- Preceded by: Sir Reginald Talbot
- Succeeded by: Sir John Fuller, 1st Baronet

Governor of Madras
- In office 3 November 1911 – 30 March 1912
- Governor General: Charles Hardinge, 1st Baron Hardinge of Penshurst
- Preceded by: Sir Arthur Lawley
- Succeeded by: Sir Murray Hammick (acting)

Governor of Bengal
- In office 1 April 1912 – 26 March 1917
- Monarch: George V
- Governors General: Charles Hardinge, 1st Baron Hardinge of Penshurst; Frederic Thesiger, 1st Viscount Chelmsford
- Preceded by: Sir William Duke
- Succeeded by: Marquess of Zetland

Personal details
- Born: 18 March 1859 Edinburgh, Scotland
- Died: 16 January 1926 (aged 66) 13 Portman Street, London, England
- Party: Liberal
- Spouse: Mary Nugent
- Education: St John's College, Cambridge

Thomas David Gibson-Carmichael, 1st Baron Carmichael, GCSI, GCIE, KCMG, DL, FRSE (18 March 1859 – 16 January 1926), known as Sir Thomas Gibson-Carmichael, 11th Baronet, between 1891 and 1912, was a Scottish Liberal politician and colonial administrator. He was also a keen naturalist.

== Background and education ==
Born near Edinburgh, Scotland, Carmichael was educated at the Wixenford House school of Cowley Powles, then near Eversley in Wixenford and St John's College, Cambridge. He succeeded his father as 11th Baronet in 1891.

== Political career ==
Carmichael was Private Secretary to George Trevelyan and Lord Dalhousie, when Secretaries for Scotland. He unsuccessfully contested for Peebles and Selkirk in 1892 but was successfully returned as Liberal Member of Parliament for Midlothian in 1895, succeeding William Ewart Gladstone. He continued to represent this constituency until the 1900 general election. During this period, Carmichael leased Malleny House and Garden. He developed gardens, as well as organised decorative ironwork to be added to the garden.

== Colonial Governor ==
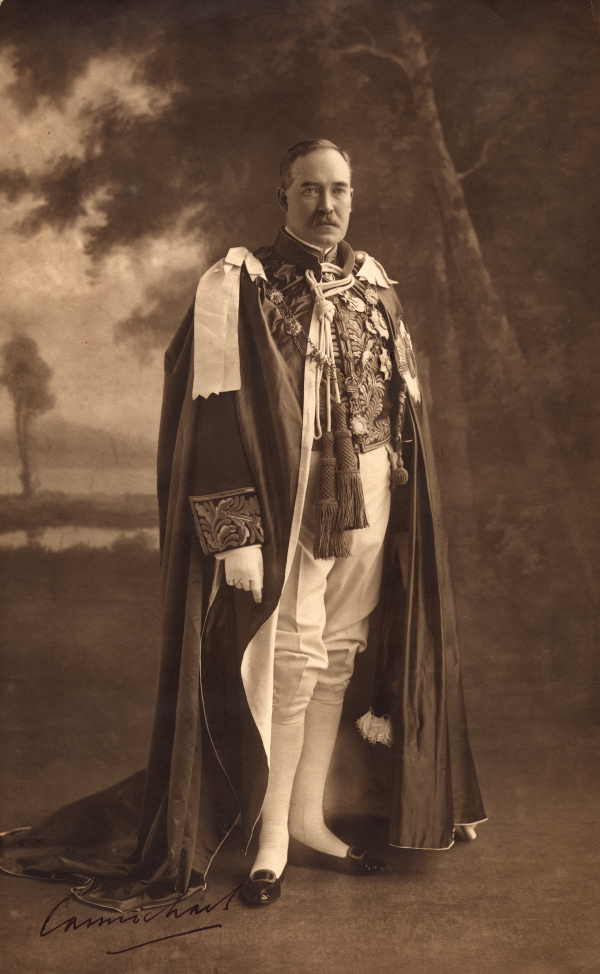
Lord Carmichael as Governor of Victoria

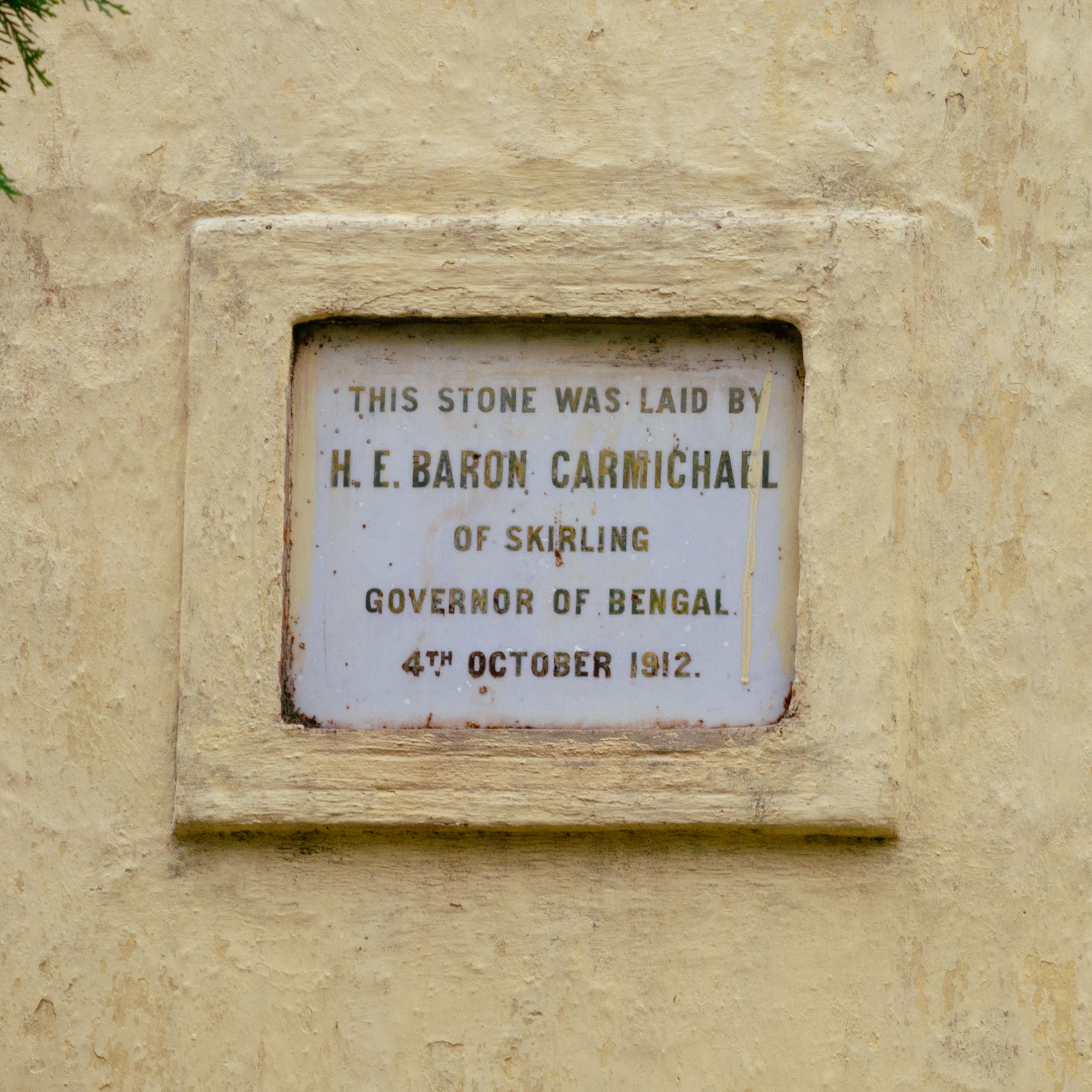
Commemorative Plaque laid by Baron Carmichael, Governor of Bengal on 4 October 1912 in Dr Graham's Home in Kalimpong

Carmichael was appointed Governor of Victoria in 1908 and served from 27 July 1908 to 19 May 1911.

As governor, Carmichael permitted Victoria Premier Sir Thomas Bent who had lost a no-confidence vote on 3 December 1908 to dissolve the assembly and call for fresh elections. Thomas Bent, however, lost the elections and John Murray succeeded him as premier. A Royal Commission investigation was started in 1909 to inquire into the financial misappropriations made by Bent.

In 1911 Carmichael was appointed governor of Madras and served from 3 November 1911 to 30 March 1912. From 1 April 1912 to 26 March 1917, he was appointed as the Governor of Bengal. He was also elected as the President of The Asiatic Society from 1913 to 1915.

== Honours ==
He was appointed a Knight Commander of the Order of St Michael and St George in 1908, a Knight Grand Commander of the Order of the Indian Empire in 1911 and a Knight Grand Commander of the Order of the Star of India in 1917. In 1912 he was raised to the peerage as Baron Carmichael, of Skirling in the County of Peebles. Sir Ashutosh Mukherjee created a post Carmichael Professor of Ancient Indian History and Culture, after his name. Carmichael College in Rangpur, Bangladesh is named after and was inaugurated by him in 1916.

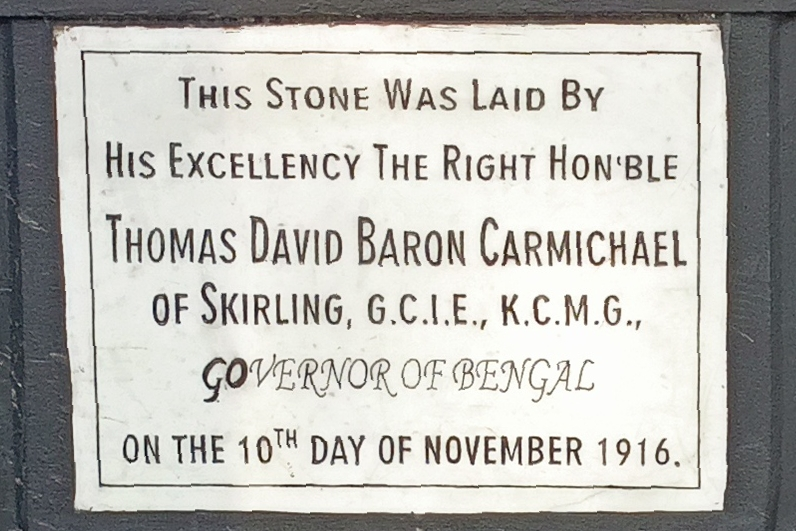
Carmichael College, Rangpur Stone Laid

== Other public appointments ==
Carmichael was also Chairman of the Commissioners in Lunacy for Scotland from 1894 to 1897, a Trustee of the Board of Manufactures in Scotland from 1900, a Trustee of the National Portrait Gallery from 1904 to 1908 and of the National Gallery from 1906 to 1908 and again from 1923 to 1926. Between 1920 and 1926 he served as Lord Lieutenant of Peeblesshire.

In 1891 he founded the Scottish Beekeepers Association.

== Freemasonry ==
He was a freemason. He was initiated, passed and raised within eight days of 1895 in the Dramatic and Arts Lodge No. 757. He became Worshipful Master of the Lodge in 1902 and served for two years. He was also appointed Senior Grand Deacon of the Grand Lodge of Scotland. Seven years later he became Grand Master of the Grand Lodge of Scotland. When he was appointed Governor of Victoria, he resigned from Grand Master only to become almost immediately Grand Master of the Grand Lodge of Victoria.

Served as Provincial Grand Master of Midlothian 1904–1909.

== Personal life ==
Lord Carmichael married the Hon. Mary Helen Elizabeth, daughter of Baron Albert Nugent, in 1886. They had no children. He died at 13 Portman Street, London, in January 1926, aged 66, and was buried at Skirling, Biggar, Lanarkshire. The barony became extinct on his death while he was succeeded in the baronetcy by his cousin, Henry Thomas Gibson-Craig. He was a keen, amateur entomologist. During his career in India, he made a large collection of insects, mainly from the Darjeeling region, which he gave to the Indian Museum before leaving India. The damselfly species, Drepanosticta carmichaeli was named after him by Laidlaw in 1915.

== Bibliography ==
- Mary Helen Elizabeth (Nugent) Carmichael (baroness.) (1929). Lord Carmichael of Skirling. Hodder and Stoughton.

Parliament of the United Kingdom
Preceded by William Ewart Gladstone	Member of Parliament for Midlothian; 1895–1900	Succeeded by Master of Elibank
Government offices
Preceded by Sir Reginald Talbot	Governor of Victoria; 1908–1911	Succeeded by Sir John Fuller, 1st Baronet
Preceded by Sir Arthur Lawley	Governor of Madras; 1911–1912	Succeeded by Sir Murray Hammick (acting)
Preceded by Sir William Duke	Governor of Bengal; 1912–1917	Succeeded by Marquess of Zetland
Honorary titles
Preceded by Lord Glenconner	Lord Lieutenant of Peeblesshire; 1920–1926	Succeeded by Sir Michael Thorburn
Masonic offices
Preceded by Charles Ramsay	Grand Master of the Grand Lodge of Scotland; 1907–1909	Succeeded by Marquess of Tullibardine
Preceded by George Emery	Grand Master of the United Grand Lodge of Victoria; 1909–1912	Succeeded by Albert Holden
Peerage of the United Kingdom
New creation	Baron Carmichael; 1912–1926	Extinct
Baronetage of Nova Scotia
Preceded by William Henry Gibson-Carmichael	Baronet (of Keirhill); 1891–1926	Succeeded by Henry Gibson-Craig-Carmichael
