= George Townshend (priest) =

Irish Anglican Archdeacon

George Townshend was an Anglican Archdeacon in Ireland.

Townshend was educated at Hertford College, Oxford and ordained in 1906. He served at Booterstown (Curate) and Ahascragh (Incumbent). He was Archdeacon of Clonfert and Kilmacduagh from 1933 until 1947.
