= George Townsend (cricketer) =

English cricketer

Personal information
- Full name: George Barnard Townsend
- Born: 17 July 1814; London, England
- Died: 19 August 1870 (aged 56); Christchurch, Hampshire, England

Domestic team information
- Years: Team
- 1849: Hampshire

Career statistics
Competition	FC
Matches	4
Runs scored	59
Batting average	7.37
100s/50s	–/–
Top score	29
Balls bowled	–
Wickets	–
Bowling average	–
5 wickets in innings	–
10 wickets in match	–
Best bowling	–
Catches/stumpings	4/–
- Source: Cricinfo, 27 April 2010

George Barnard Townsend (17 July 1814 – 19 August 1870) was an English first-class cricketer.

Townsend represented Hampshire in four first-class matches, making his debut in 1843 against the Marylebone Cricket Club and playing his final first-class match for the county in 1850 against an All England Eleven.

Townsend died on 19 August 1870 at Christchurch, Hampshire.
