= Hammick baronets =

Baronetcy in the Baronetage of the United Kingdom

- Escutcheon of the Hammick baronets of Cavendish Square
- Creation date: 1834
- Status: extant
- Motto: Laudari a laudato, To be praised by one already praised

The Hammick Baronetcy, of Cavendish Square, London, is a title in the Baronetage of the United Kingdom. It was created on 25 July 1834 for the noted surgeon and physician Stephen Hammick.

== Hammick baronets, of Cavendish Square (1834) ==
- Sir Stephen Love Hammick, 1st Baronet (1777–1867)
- Sir St Vincent Love Hammick, 2nd Baronet (1806–1888)
- Sir St Vincent Alexander Hammick, 3rd Baronet (1839–1927)
  - Captain Stephen Frederick Hammick (1879–1916), killed in action during World War I, and only son of the 3rd Baronet.
  - Vice-Admiral Robert Frederick Hammick (1843–1922), 2nd son of the 2nd Baronet and father of the 4th Baronet.
- Sir George Frederick Hammick, 4th Baronet (1885–1964)
- Sir Stephen George Hammick, 5th Baronet (1926–2014)
- Sir Jeremy Charles Hammick, 6th Baronet (born 1956)

The heir presumptive is Stephen Timothy John Hammick (born 1946), a kinsman of the present holder.

== Extended family ==
Sir Murray Hammick, seventh son of the second Baronet, was in the Indian Civil Service. Alexander Hammick (1887–1969), younger brother of the fourth Baronet, was a rear admiral in the Royal Navy.

== Notes ==
Baronetage of the United Kingdom
Preceded by Hawkins-Whitshed baronets	Hammick baronets of Cavendish Square; 25 July 1834	Succeeded by Brodie baronets
