= Sir Stephen Hammick, 1st Baronet =

Sir Stephen Love Hammick, 1st Baronet (28 February 1777 – 15 June 1867) was an English physician and baronet.

== Early life ==
Hammick was born on 28 February 1777. He was the son of Stephen Hammick, a surgeon and Alderman of Plymouth, and Elizabeth Margaret Love. His maternal grandfather was John Love, a surgeon of Plymouth Dockyard.

In 1792, he studied at the Royal Navy Hospital, Plymouth under his father, and was appointed Assistant Surgeon there in 1793. In 1799, after further study for a few months at St George's Hospital, he qualified at the Corporation of Surgeons afterwards returning to Plymouth.

== Career ==
Hammick was elected full surgeon to the Royal College of Surgeons of England in 1803 and was 1st Surgeon at Royal Navy Hospital, Plymouth in Devon. Disallowed from private practice by his appointment to the Royal College, he nevertheless gave free opinions in challenging cases. He was also Surgeon Extraordinary to George IV as Prince of Wales, Prince Regent, and King, also to the household of William IV.

He was created 1st Baronet Hammick, of Cavendish Square, London in the Baronetage of the United Kingdom on 25 July 1834. He was a member of the Senate of the University of London since its creation.

== Personal life ==
On 7 February 1800, Hammick was married to Frances Turquand, the only daughter of London merchant Peter Turquand and Eliza Hicks. They lived at Milton Abbot, Tavistock. Together, they were the parents of:

- Frances Hammick (d. 1871), who died unmarried.
- Stephen Love Hammick (1804–1839), a Christ Church, Oxford trained physician who died unmarried.
- Sir St Vincent Love Hammick, 2nd Baronet (1806–1888), who married Mary Alexander, daughter of Robert Alexander, a member of the Council of India, in 1837.

Stephen died in Plymouth on 15 June 1867 at age 90. As he was predeceased by his elder son, his second son, the St Vincent succeeded to the baronetcy.

Baronetage of the United Kingdom
New creation	Baronet (of Cavendish Square); 1834–1867	Succeeded by St Vincent Love Hammick
