= List of people from Brahmanbaria District =

This is a list of notable residents and people who have origins in the Brahmanbaria District of Bangladesh. This list also includes British Bangladeshis, Bangladeshi Americans, Bangladeshi Canadians, and other non-resident Bengalis who have origins in Brahmanbaria. The people may also be known as Brahmanbarian.

== Activism and cause célèbres ==
- Ataur Rahman Khan Khadim, physician martyred during the Bangladesh Liberation War
- Dhirendranath Datta, Language activist and lawyer assassinated during the Bangladesh Liberation War
- Oli Ahad, Language activist and politician
- Sultanuddin Ahmed, engineer martyred during the Bangladesh Liberation War
- Tarani Debnath, activist martyred in the Bengali Language Movement of the Barak Valley
- Ullaskar Dutta, Indian revolutionary, was born in Kalikachha in 1885.

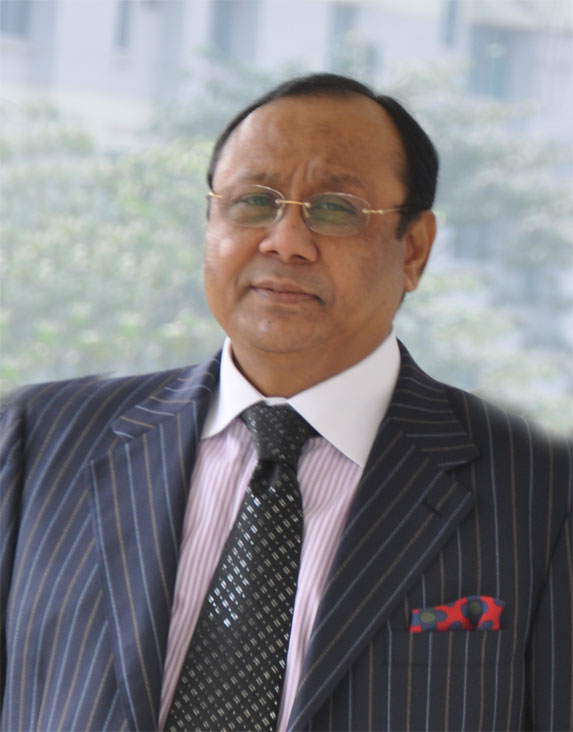
Ahmed Akbar Sobhan is a business magnate, owning a business conglomerate which operates in various lines of activities.

Abdus Suttar Khan invented more than forty different alloys for commercial application in space shuttles, jet engines, train engines and industrial gas turbines.

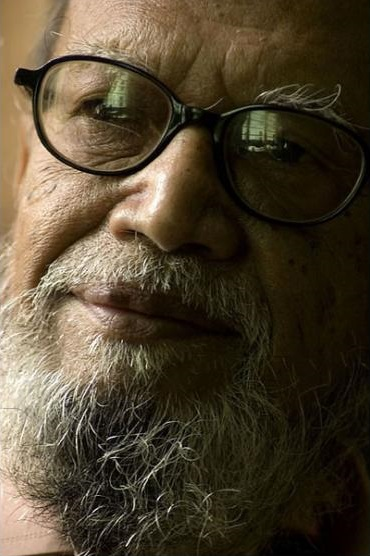
Al Mahmud is considered one of the greatest Bengali poets to have emerged in the 1950s.

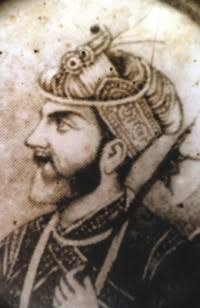
A 19th century sketch of Isa Khan, a Muslim Rajput leader of Bengal.

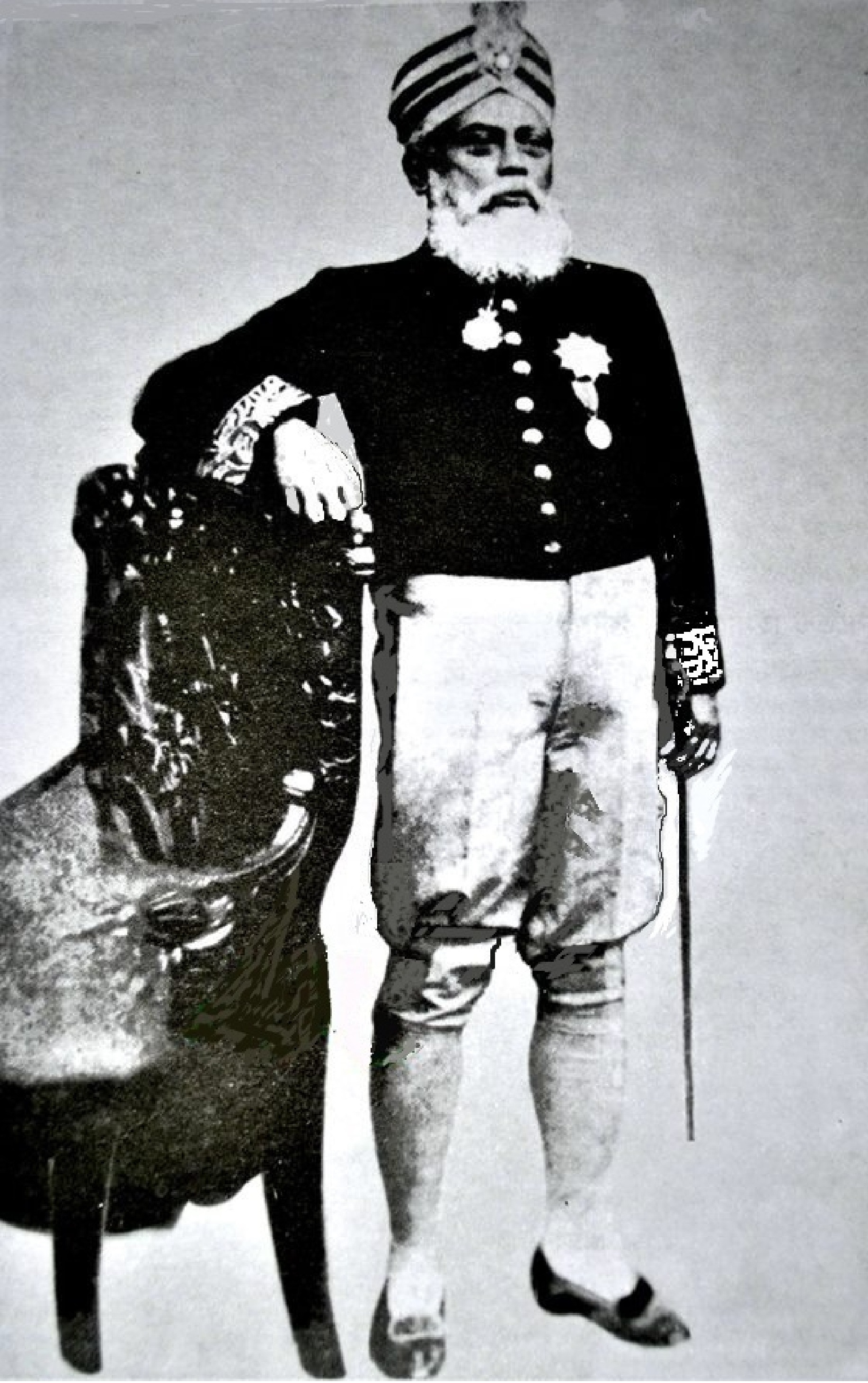
Nawab Syed Shamsul Huda was a patron, and donated immensely towards education for the Muslim students of Bengal during a difficult period.

== Business, economy and industry ==
- Ahmed Akbar Sobhan, founder and chairman of the Bashundhara Group
- Akbar Ali Khan, economist
- Fayzur Rahman, chairman of Novoair
- Mohammad Ebadul Karim Bulbul, managing director of Beacon Pharmaceuticals
- Obaidul Karim, chairman, Orion Group (Bangladesh), Kohinoor Chemical
- Narendra Chandra Dutta, banking pioneer of India
- Salehuddin Ahmed, 9th governor of Bangladesh Bank

== Education ==
- Kabir Chowdhury, academic and essayist
- Khan Sarwar Murshid, sixth vice-chancellor of the University of Rajshahi
- Khandaker Mustahidur Rahman
- M. Harunur Rashid, teacher of English and Sufi writer
- M Harunur Rashid, archaeologist, educationist and museum curator
- Katyayanidas Bhattacharya, philosopher and academic
- Momtazuddin Ahmed, philosopher and educationist

== Entertainment ==
- Abed Hossain Khan, musician, composer, and music director, was born in Shibpur in 1929.
- Alamgir, film actor and television host
- Ali Akbar Khan, classical musician
- Aly Zaker, Actor
- Allauddin Khan, world-renowned traditional musician
- Amar Pal, Bengali folk singer and author
- Arfin Rumey, singer
- Ayet Ali Khan, classical musician
- Bahadur Khan, sarod player and film score composer
- Dolly Johur, actress
- Dhiraj Choudhury, painter
- Delwar Jahan Jhantu, film director
- Fakir Aftabuddin Khan, folk musician
- Ferdous Ara, singer
- Khadem Hossain Khan, classical musician, was born in Shibpur in 1922.
- Khurshid Khan, sitarist, was born in Sadekpur of Nabinagar thana in 1935.
- Kirit Khan, classical musician
- Mobarak Hossain Khan, musician
- Raja Hossain Khan, music director, composer
- Sabrina Porshi, singer
- Shaju Khadem, actor
- Sariful Razz, actor
- Sheikh Sadi Khan, music composer
- Syed Abdul Hadi, singer
- Subal Das, music director and composer, was born in Brahmanbaria in 1927.
- Rafiqul Bari Chowdhury, cinematographer and director
- Zakia Bari Mamo, actress and model
- Ziaul Roshan, film actor and model

== Science ==
- Abdus Suttar Khan, aerospace specialist, chemist and inventor
- Abul Kalam Mohammed Zakaria, archaeologist
- Ahsan Ali, doctor, physician and researcher
- Jahangir Alam Khan, agricultural economist and researcher
- M. A. Zaher, director-general of the Geological Survey of Bangladesh
- Mustafa Jabbar, minister of posts and telecommunications (2018–2023), was born in Char Chartala in 1949.

== Literature ==
- Ahmed Rafiq, Bengali language movement activist, writer, and researcher, was born in Shahbazpur in 1929.
- Al Mahmud, poet and novelist
- Adwaita Mallabarman, writer best known for Titash Ekti Nadir Naam, was born in Gokarna in 1914.
- Hasnat Abdul Hye, writer and novelist
- Syed Shamsul Haque, poet and novelist
- Sufia Kamal, poet and activist

=== Journalism ===
- Abdul Quadir, poet, essayist and journalist
- Abdul Hafiz, writer, essayist and journalist
- Habibur Rahman Milon, journalist, was born in Uchalia Para in 1935.
- Shah Alamgir, journalist

== Military ==
- A. B. Tajul Islam, retired Bangladesh Army captain and former Minister of Liberation War Affairs
- Abu Saleh Mohammad Nasim, 7th Chief of Army Staff of the Bangladesh Army
- Muhammed Abul Manzur, military officer
- Sultan Shahriar Rashid Khan, army officer convicted for the assassination of Sheikh Mujibur Rahman

== Monarchs and rulers ==
- Isa Khan, leader of the Baro-Bhuiyan chieftains of Bengal, was the zamindar of Sarail.
- Musa Khan, leader of the Baro-Bhuiyan chieftains of Bengal
- Masum Khan, Baro-Bhuiyan zamindar
- Syeda Momena Khatun, princess of Bengal Sultanate
- Kazi Golam Mohiuddin Faroqui (1891–1984), knight and politician

== Politics ==
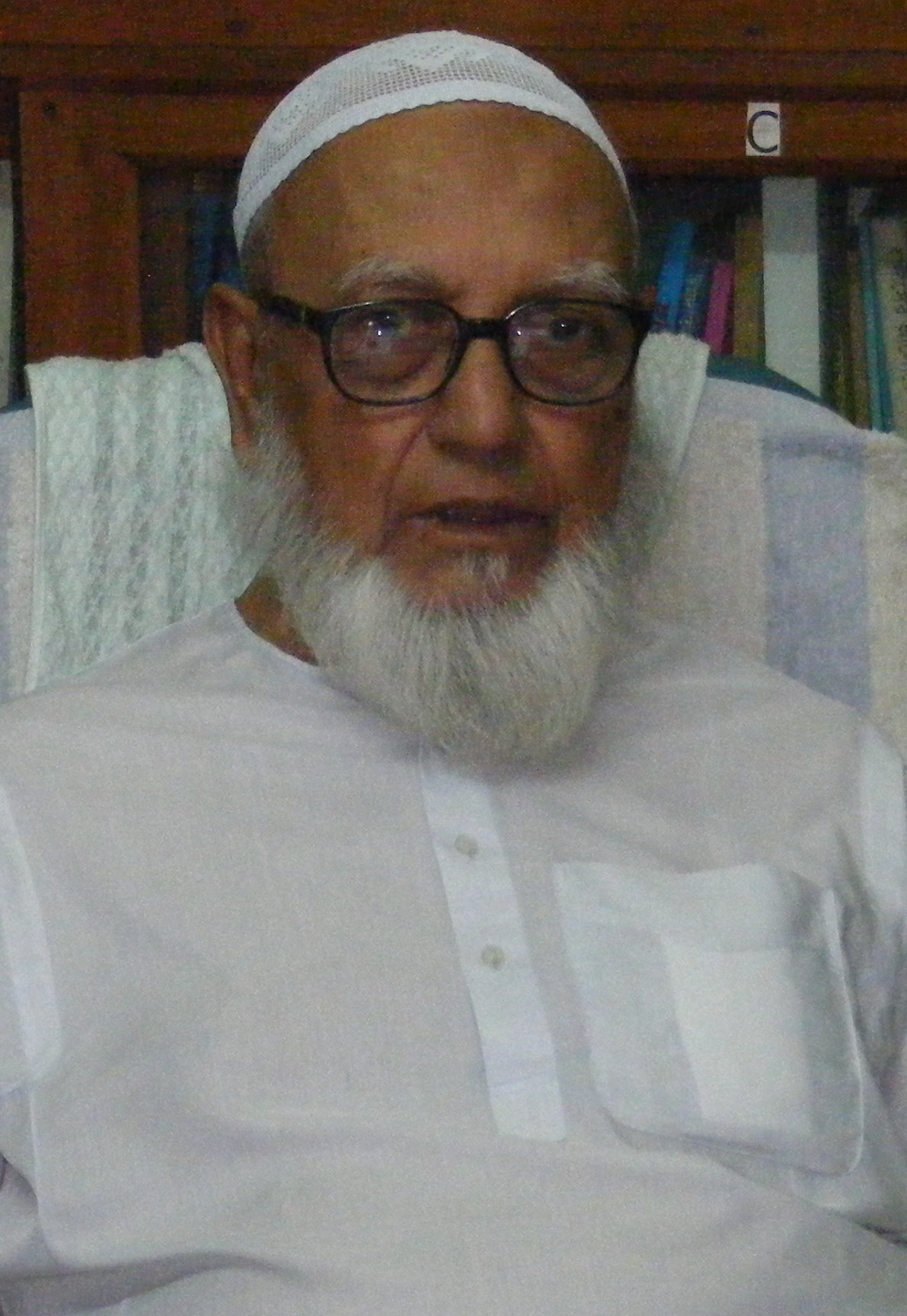
Ghulam Azam, former leader and founder of the Bangladesh Jamaat-e-Islami.

- A. T. M. Wali Ashraf, MP for Brahmanbaria-6
- Abdul Khaleque, MP for Brahmanbaria-6
- Abdul Latif, MP for Brahmanbaria-5
- Abdul Kuddas Makhan, MP for Comilla-5
- Abdus Sattar Bhuiyan, member of parliament, was born in Parmanandpur in 1939.
- Abdul Rasul, nationalist leader and lawyer
- Ahmed Ali, politician
- Anisul Huq, Law Minister of Bangladesh
- Ashraf Ali Dharnondoli, Islamist politician, was born in Dharmandal in 1920.
- Bodruddoza Md. Farhad Hossain, MP for Brahmanbaria-1
- Dewan Mahbub Ali, member of the East Bengal Legislative Assembly, lived in Sarail.
- Dewan Sirajul Huq, MP for Comilla-4 and one of the founding members of Bangladesh Nationalist Party
- Faridul Huda, MP for Comilla-2
- Ghulam Azam, leader of the Bangladesh Jamaat-e-Islami (1969–2000), attended a madrasa in Birgaon.
- Haroon Al Rashid, MP for Brahmanbaria-3
- Humayun Kabir (politician), former mayor of Brahmanbaria and MP of Brahmanbaria-3
- Kazi Md. Anowar Hossain, MP for Brahmanbaria-5
- Liaquat Ali, MP for Brahmanbaria-4
- Lutful Hai Sachchu, MP for Brahmanbaria-3
- Mia Abdullah Wazed, MP for Brahmanbaria-4
- Mohammad Sayedul Haque, Fisheries and Livestock Minister of Bangladesh
- Mohammad Shah Alam, MP for Brahmanbaria-4
- Mozammel Haque, former MP for Brahmanbaria-1
- Mukhlesur Rahman Chowdhury, de facto President and Prime Minister, former Adviser to Iajuddin Ahmed
- Murshed Kamal, former MP for Brahmanbaria-1
- Mushfiqur Rahman, MP for Brahmanbaria-4
- Nurul Amin, prime minister of Pakistan (December 1970), was born in Shahbazpur in 1893.
- R. A. M. Obaidul Muktadir Chowdhury, MP for Brahmanbaria-3
- Rumeen Farhana, politician
- Sahidur Rahman, MP for Brahmanbaria-6
- Serajul Huq, one of the founding member of the Bangladesh Awami League
- Shahjahan Hawlader Sujan, former MP for Brahmanbaria-6
- Shah Jikrul Ahmad, MP for Brahmanbaria-5
- Sheuly Azad, member of parliament (2019–2024), lives in West Kuttapara.
- Syed Emdadul Bari, lawyer and politician, was born at Ranikhar in 1935.
- Syed Shamsul Huda, Nawab of Gokarna, president of the All India Muslim League
- Tafazzal Ali, deputy speaker of the Bengal Legislative Assembly, was born in Kasba in 1906.
- Taheruddin Thakur, minister of state for information and broadcasting (1975), was from Sarail.
- Ziaul Haque Mridha, MP for Brahmanbaria-2

== Religion ==
- Abdul Khaleque, founder of Chhatura Sharif
- Anandamayi Ma, Hindu saint
- Fazlul Haque Amini, principal of Jamia Qurania Arabia Lalbagh and politician
- Sajidur Rahman, professor of Hadith at Jamia Islamia Yunusia
- Tajul Islam, director of Jamia Islamia Yunusia

== Sports ==
- Ahsanullah Montu, former player for the Bangladesh national football team
- Mamun Khan, former player for the Bangladesh national football team
- Saifur Rahman Moni, former player for the Bangladesh national football team
- Gazi Salahuddin, cricketer for Chittagong Division cricket team
- Mohammad Ashraful, former captain of Bangladesh national cricket team
- Mohammed Kaikobad, former player for the Bangladesh national football team
- Zahirul Haque, footballer, was born in Nabinagar in 1935.
