= Khadem Hossain Khan =

Bangladeshi classical musician

- খাদেম হোসেন খান
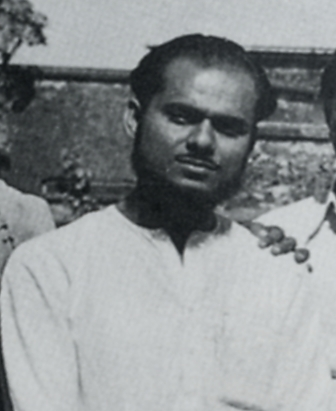
- Khan in 1955
- Born: 1922; Brahmanbaria, Bengal Presidency, British India
- Died: 1992 (aged 69–70)
- Occupation: Musician
- Father: Nayeb Ali Khan
- Relatives: Sabdar Hossain Khan (grandfather); Bahadur Khan (uncle); Mobarak Hossain Khan (uncle); Abed Hossain Khan (uncle); Sheikh Sadi Khan (uncle)

Khadem Hossain Khan (1922–1992) was a Bangladeshi classical musician. In 1980, The government of Bangladesh awarded him the Independence Award.

== Early life ==
Khan was born in Shibpur village, Brahmanbaria, East Bengal, British Raj on 1922. He trained under his father Nayeb Ali Khan. He learned how to play the tabla under his uncle, Fakir Aftabuddin Khan. He learned the sitar from Ustad Ayet Ali Khan and Allauddin Khan. He studied in Kolkata under Zamindar of Gouripur, Birendra Kishore Roy Chowdhury and Ustad Dabir Khan.

== Career ==
Khan moved to Dhaka before the Partition of India where he worked in Dhaka Radio. He joined Radio Pakistan after the Partition. In 1971, after the Independence of Bangladesh, he was made the chief music producer of Bangladesh Betar. He served as the director of the dance troop of Bulbul Chowdhury. He was one of the founders of Bulbul Lalitakala Academy and was the head of the Department of Instrumental Music. He was the Managing Director of Alauddin Little Orchestra Group.

== Death ==
Khan died on 1992.
