= Phuljhuri Khan =

Musician from Bangladesh

- Born: Yaar Rasul Khan; 1920; Brahmanbaria, Bengal Presidency, British India
- Died: 5 May 1982 (aged 61–62)

Yaar Rasul Khan (known as Phuljhuri Khan; 1920 – 5 May 1982) was a tabla and esraj player from Bangladesh. He also played sanai, sitar, and pakhawaj. He was the recipient of the Independence Award, the highest civilian award for Bangladeshis, in the music category in 1979.

== Background ==
Yaar Rasul Khan was born in 1920 in Beetgarh, British India, now under Nabinagar Upazila (sub-district), Brahmanbaria District in then Bengal Presidency, British India. He was the eldest son of Latif Rasul Khan and Begum Kamala-un-nesa. From his maternal side, he belongs to the noted family of Ustad (Maestro) Alauddin Khan, the world reputed Maestro of Seni-Maihar and Alauddin Gharana of Indian classical music. His mother was the eldest daughter of Fakir Aftabuddin Khan, who was the elder brother of Ustad Alauddin Khan, and Ustad Ayet Ali Khan.

== Early life and training ==
Khan learned tabla from his maternal grandfather Aftabuddin Khan in his boyhood. Then he went to Maihar State of India (currently under Madhya Pradesh) to learn tabla from Ustad Alauddin Khan, the state musician. He received training in tabla from him for eight years.

== Career and achievements ==
Maharaja of Maiher was captivated by Khan's strumming on tabla during a performance and bestowed on him the title Phuljhuri (i.e. fireworks that emit starry sparks). Gradually he became more renowned as Phuljhuri Khan. He later joined Maihar Orchestra and used to accompany Ustad Alauddin Khan with tabla. He joined Ustad Allauddin Khan in Lucknow Conference several times. He returned to his village home and received Talim in esraj from Ustad Ayet Ali Khan (Aftabuddin Khan's youngest brother) for five years.

Khan traveled many countries as a member of Udayshankar Ballet Troupe, where he played tabla, pakhawaj, and esraj.

Khan was a music teacher in Shantiniketan and also played instruments for the composition of Nobel Laureate Poet Rabindranath Tagore, under the poet's own direction. He had memorable performance on esraj in the drama Chitrangada.

Khan established a music school in Shillong.

Khan joined Radio Pakistan and then Radio Bangladesh, Dhaka as staff artiste from 1949 - 1975. He also played esraj for many films, television, stage and discs. The notable names of the films include Aakash ar Mati (The Sky and the Earth), Mukh o Mukhosh (Face and Mask), Rajdhanir Bukey (In the Heart of the Capital City), Natun Sur (New Tune), Surya Snan (Sun Bath), and Surya Grahan (Solar Eclipse).

== Awards and distinctions ==
- Bangladesh Shilpakala Academy (The National Academy of Fine and Performing Arts) (1977)
- Independence Day Award (1979)

Government of Bangladesh published commemorative postage stamps on him in 2005.

== Death and legacy ==
Khan died on 5 May 1982 in Dhaka. His sons are instrument players — Md. Yunus Khan (sarod), Md. Jafar Khan (sitar), Md. Yusuf Khan (sarod), Md. Ilias Khan (tabla), and Md. Khairul Islam Khan (tabla).
