= Khurshid Khan (musician) =

Bangladeshi musician

Ustad Khurshid Khan
- খুরশিদ খান
- Born: 1 January 1935; Brahmanbaria, Bengal Presidency, British India
- Died: 20 January 2012 (aged 77)
- Occupation: Musician
- Mother: Ambia Khanam
- Relatives: Ayet Ali Khan (grandfather); Bahadur Khan (uncle); Mobarak Hossain Khan (uncle); Abed Hossain Khan (uncle); Sheikh Sadi Khan (uncle)
- Awards: Independence Award (2000)

Khurshid Khan (1 January 1935 – 20 January 2012) was a Bangladeshi musician and sitarist. He was awarded the Independence Award in 2000 for his unique contribution to the pursuit of music by the government of Bangladesh.

== Early life ==
Khan was born on 1 January 1935 in Sadakpur, Nabinagar, Brahmanbaria in the then Bengal Presidency, British India. His family had musical background. His mother, Ambia Khanam, was a daughter of Ustad Ayet Ali Khan. He was trained by his uncles, Abed Hossain Khan and Bahadur Khan.

== Career ==
Khan worked at the State Radio as a sarod player from 1961 to 1964; and then joined the National Television Network (present Bangladesh Television) and retired as music producer in 1993. He was a music jury member at the University of Dhaka. He taught at Chhayanaut, a music school, from 1963 to 2005.

Four albums was published based on his sitar recitals - "Music from Bangladesh", "North Indian Classical Music", "Tribute to Grandfather Ustad Ayet Ali Khan" and "Relation".

== Awards ==
- Ustad Ayet Ali Khan Gold Medal (1998)
- Independence Award (2000)
- Rabindra Padak by Jatiyo Rabindrasangeet Sammilon Parishad (2005)

== Death ==
Khan died on 20 January 2012.
