= Raja Hossain Khan =

Bangladeshi musician

Raja Hossain Khan (1938 – March 6, 1989), was a music director, composer and violin player from Bangladesh. He came from a musical family, and was the nephew of multi-instrumentalist and music teacher Alauddin Khan, and Ayet Ali Khan.

== Early life and training ==
Born in Brahmanbaria as the youngest son of Nayeb Ali Khan, he began his music lessons in violin with his father. Later he went to Kolkata to continue his higher training from his cousin Bahadur Khan, a sarod player, under whom he studied for a period of three years. He then took music lessons from Ali Akbar Khan, another cousin, and also from his eldest brother Khadem Hossain Khan.

== discography ==
composer

- Dheu Er Por Dheu (1970)
- Shasti (1984)

background score

- Jahan Baaje Shehnai (1968)

== Career ==
Raja Hossain Khan then joined Dhaka Radio (Bangladesh Betar) as a ‘Staff Artist’. He was also associated in the film industry, and was music director for a number of movies. He was accorded State Award for music direction in the film Surjagrohon. He tuned a large number of popular songs for National Radio and Television (BTV). He also visited a number of other countries as a member of cultural delegations.

Raja Hossain had three sons named Palash Khan, Titas Khan, and Plabon Khan. He died in a tragic road accident on March 6, 1989.
