= M A Hannan (politician) =

Bangladeshi politician

- এম এ হান্নান

Member of the Bangladesh Parliament for Brahmanbaria-1
- Incumbent
- Assumed office 17 February 2026
- Preceded by: Syed AK Ekramuzzaman

Personal details
- Born: 1 January 1973 (age 53) Nasirnagar Upazila, Brahmanbaria District
- Party: Bangladesh Nationalist Party

M A Hannan is a Bangladeshi politician. He is currently a member of parliament from Brahmanbaria-1.

== Early life ==
Hannan was born on 1 January 1973 at Nasirnagar Upazila under Brahmanbaria District.
