= Syed AK Ekramuzzaman =

Bangladeshi politician

- সৈয়দ এ কে একরামুজ্জামান

Member of the Bangladesh Parliament for Brahmanbaria-1
- In office 30 January 2024 – 6 August 2024
- Preceded by: Bodruddoza Md. Farhad Hossain

Personal details
- Born: 1 January 1957 (age 69) Brahmanbaria, East Pakistan, Pakistan
- Party: BNP
- Nickname: Sukhan

Syed A.K. Ekramuzzaman is a Bangladeshi politician. He is the managing director of RAK Ceramics in Bangladesh. He is a former member of Jatiya Sangsad, having been elected to represent the Brahmanbaria-1 constituency as an independent politician in the 2024 Bangladeshi general election, before subsequently joining the Awami League in February 2024.

== Early life ==
Syed A. K. Ekramuzzaman was born on 1 January 1957 in the village of Chapartala, under Nasirnagar Upazila. His father's name is Syed Q. Zaman, and his mother's name is Syeda [given name] Zaman. Ekramuzzaman is a businessman. According to reports, he was one of the most talked-about individuals among those who submitted nominations for the 12th Jatiya Sangsad (National Parliament) election.

He is the managing director of RAK Ceramics. In addition, he serves as the chairman of Star Ceramics Limited, Star Porcelain, and SAK Consumer.

== Political career ==
Syed A. K. Ekramuzzaman (Sukhan) was an adviser to Khaleda Zia, chairperson of the Bangladesh Nationalist Party. He had previously been nominated by the BNP as a candidate for the Brahmanbaria-1 constituency. In the 9th national parliamentary election, he was defeated by the Awami League candidate Mohammad Sayedul Haque. In the 11th parliamentary election, he lost again to Awami League candidate Bodruddoza Md. Farhad Hossain.

On 28 November 2023, Syed A. K. Ekramuzzaman (Sukhan) was expelled from all positions within the BNP. He joined the Awami League on 13 February 2024.

In the 12th parliamentary election, he was elected as an independent Member of Parliament after receiving 89,424 votes, defeating his closest rival Bodruddoza Md. Farhad Hossain by a margin of 43,225 votes.

However, on 5 August 2024, amid the Non-cooperation movement, then-Prime Minister Sheikh Hasina resigned and fled to India. The following day, on 6 August, the President dissolved the Parliament, as a result of which Ekramuzzaman lost his seat in the Jatiya Sangsad.
