= Mobarak Hossain Khan =

Bangladeshi musicologist, musician, and writer (1938–2019)

- Born: 27 February 1938; Brahmanbaria, Bengal Province, British India
- Died: 24 November 2019 (aged 81); Dhaka, Bangladesh
- Education: University of Dhaka (MA)
- Spouse: Fauzia Yasmin
- Children: Reenat; Tareef; Tanim
- Parents: Ayet Ali Khan (father); Umarunnesa (mother)
- Relatives: Bahadur Khan (brother); Sheikh Sadi Khan (brother); Abed Hossain Khan (brother)
- Website: www.mobarakhossainkhan.com

Mobarak Hossain Khan (27 February 1938 – 24 November 2019) was a Bangladeshi musicologist, musician, and writer. He played the surbahar, a bass version of the sitar. He was awarded Ekushey Padak in 1986, Independence Day Award in 1994, and Bangla Academy Literary Award in 2002 by the government of Bangladesh.

== Background ==
Khan was born on 27 February 1938 to Ustad Ayet Ali Khan and Umarunnesa at Shibpur village, Nabinagar, Brahmanbaria in the then Bengal Province, British India. His grandfather was Sabdar Hossain Khan (Sadu Khan), and other uncles include Alauddin Khan, Samiruddin Khan, Fakir Aftabuddin Khan, and Ustad Nayeb Ali Khan.

Khan was the youngest among his siblings Bahadur Khan, Abed Hossain Khan, and Sheikh Sadi Khan, Ambia, Kohinoor and Razia. His relatives include Ali Akbar Khan (his cousin), Annapurna Devi (his cousin), Pandit Ravi Shankar (Annapurna's husband of first marriage), his other cousins Ustad Khadem Hossain Khan, Ustad Mir Kashem Khan, his nephews Ustad Phuljhuri Khan, Ustad Khurshid Khan, Ustad Shahadat Hossain Khan, Ustad Bidyut Khan, and Ustad Kirit Khan.

Khan earned his M. A. in History from the University of Dhaka.

== Career and awards ==
Khan was the Director General of National Academy of Fine and Performing Arts (Bangladesh Shilpakala Academy) and former Chairman of Nazrul Institute named after the Poet-Laureate of Bangladesh Kazi Nazrul Islam. He was also the President of the Bangladesh Chapter of International Council for Traditional Music (ICTM), the headquarters being in the US and the President of Ustad Ayet Ali Khan Academy of Music. He also served Radio Bangladesh and former Radio Pakistan for a long stint of 30 years. He was also the secretary general of the International PEN Bangladesh Chapter, headquarters being in London, UK

Khan visited many countries including USA, U. K., China, Canada, Colombia, France, Germany, Japan, North Korea, Indonesia, Thailand, Hong Kong, Singapore, Spain, Kuwait, Iran, India, Pakistan, and Australia as a leader of cultural delegation, and also as an expert on radio, SAARC, UNESCO, as well as on classical music.

Khan and his wife Fauzia Yasmin were involved in planning, research and hosting a popular TV musical program on NTV, named Bajo ebong Bajao, which features Nazrul Sangeet with the sangat (co-performance) of sitar, sarod, and other classical instruments.

== Academics ==
Khan was a visiting lecturer of College of Music, Dhaka, Bangladesh, and associated with the Department of Drama and Music of the University of Dhaka and University of Rajshahi.

== Books ==
Khan wrote a total of 137 books, 3 of them are in English. He also contributed to the Banglapedia, the national encyclopedia of Bangladesh, published by the Asiatic Society of Bangladesh.

Khan's three books on music in English are:

- —— (1988). Music and Its Study. New Delhi: Sterling Publishers. ISBN 978-8120707641.
- —— (1992). Islamic Contribution to South Asia's Classical Music. New Delhi: Sterling Publishers. ISBN 978-8120713499.
- —— (2002). Ustad Alauddin Khan: The Legend in Music. New Delhi: Sterling Publishers. ISBN 978-8120723115.

Among his 137 books, 30 are original research books on Music in Bangla, and the 3 mentioned above are his original research books on Music in English. Besides, he has published 19 more books on Music for juveniles. He started with translations, and he had published 20 of them, and later he had translated 23 more books for Juveniles. There were 34 more books on Juvenile stories. He had published 2 novels and 2 autobiographical books. Another notable contribution is his 4 books on Bangladesh Liberation War.

== Personal life ==
Khan was married to Fauzia Yasmin. They had one daughter, Reenat Fauzia, and two sons, Tareef Hayat Khan, and Tanim Hayat Khan.

== Honors and awards ==
- Ekushey Padak (1986)
- Independence Day Award (1994)
- Bangla Academy Literary Award (2002)
- Nazrul Gold Medal
- Moulana Akram Khan Gold Medal
- Atish Dipankar Gold Medal

== Death ==
Khan died on 24 November 2019 at the age of 81.

== Notes ==
- Marcus, Scott L. (1 November 1990). "Book reviews – South Asia". Journal of Asian Studies. 47 (4). Berlin: Springer-Verlag: 974–975. doi:10.2307/2058313. ISSN 0021-9118. JSTOR 2058313.
