= Kirit =

Kirit may refer to:

== Places ==
- Kirit, Togdheer, a town in Somaliland
- Kırıt, Tarsus, a village in Turkey

== People ==
- Steve Kirit (born 1972), American strongman competitor
- Kirit Bikram Kishore Deb Barman (1933–2006), king of Tripura, India
- Kirit Khan (1955–2006), Bengali-Indian sitar player
- Kirit Parikh, Indian academic
- Kirit Raval (died 2005), Indian attorney
- Kirit Shelat (born 1946), Indian public administrator
- Kirit Premjibhai Solanki (born 1950), Indian surgeon and politician
- Kirit Somaiya (born 1954), Indian

== See also ==
- Kirti
