= Reenat Fauzia =

Bangladeshi musician

- Born: 1967 (age 58–59)
- Education: University of Dhaka, Masters in Home Economics
- Parents: Mobarak Hossain Khan (father); Fauzia Yasmin (mother)
- Website: reenatfauzia.com

Reenat Fauzia (born 1967) is a Bangladeshi sitarist.

== Early life and family ==
Fauzia was born in 1967. She is the daughter of Mobarak Hossain Khan, a former Director General of Bangladesh Shilpakala Academy and the chairman of the Trustee Board of Nazrul Institute, and Fauzia Khan, a vocal artist. She is the granddaughter of Ustaad Ayet Ali Khan.

== Training ==
Fauzia started her training in music lessons from her cousin Ustaad Shahadat Hossain Khan, a sarode player of Bangladesh. Later, she received her Guru-Shishya-Parampara music training from her cousin Ustaad Khurshid Khan, a sitar preceptor. She completed a five-year certificate course on sitar from Chhayanaut, a music institute of Bangladesh. Later she joined the faculty of the same institute as a teacher. After taking lessons on sitar for twelve years, she joined participating in programs of Bangladesh Television and Bangladesh Betar. She also makes appearances on stage for performing solo recital on sitar During her visit to the US, UK, the Netherlands, Belgium, Germany, France, Philippines, and Hong Kong, she performed recitals on Sitar.

== Awards ==
- Anannya Top Ten Award (2009)

== Discography ==
- A Touch of Love
- Tribute to Grandfather Ustad Ayet Ali Khan
- Haramanik
