= Shahadat Hossain Khan =

Bangladeshi musician (1958–2020)

- শাহাদাত হোসেন খান
- Born: 1958; Comilla, East Pakistan, Pakistan
- Died: 28 November 2020 (aged 61–62); Dhaka, Bangladesh
- Spouse: Purubi Khan
- Children: Afsana Khan, Rukhsana Khan
- Father: Abed Hossain Khan
- Relatives: Ayet Ali Khan (grandfather); Ali Akbar Khan (uncle); Bahadur Khan (uncle); Allauddin Khan (great-uncle)
- Awards: Ekushey Padak

Shahadat Hossain Khan (1958 – 28 November 2020) was a Bangladeshi musician. He was the only son of Ustad Abed Hossain Khan. He came from a family of notable musicians of the sub-continent. He is the grandson of Ustad Ayet Ali Khan (the youngest brother of Ustad Allauddin Khan), and nephew of Ustad Ali Akbar Khan, Ustad Bahadur Khan, and Musicologist Mobarak Hossain Khan.

== Early life and training ==
Khan was born in Comilla, East Pakistan (now in Bangladesh). At 7, he started taking lessons on sarod from his father. Later on, he became a disciple of his uncle Ustad Bahadur Khan, the sarod player of the sub-continent. In 1972, Shahadat performed an instrumental duet with his uncle Bahadur at the 'Alauddin Music Conference' in Dhaka. In 1974, Shahadat was honored with a state award for his musical performance.

== Tours and performances ==
During extensive tours of India with his father as a guest artist of All India Radio, Khan performed in Kolkata, Madras (Chennai), Srinagar, and Delhi. He had the unique opportunity of participating in the 'All India Radio Music Conference' along with the notable exponents of classical music from all over India. He was honored with the 'Chalochchitro Projojok Samiti' (Association of Film Producers Award) for his super performance. In 1980, he accompanied a Bangladesh cultural delegation to the Middle East. In 1983, Shahadat participated in the 'All Bangladesh Music Conference' in Dhaka and won a gold medal. In 1989, he was honored with a Rotary (Buriganga) Award in recognition of his excellent performance on Sarod. In 1991, he performed solo in France raising funds for the flood victims of Bangladesh. He accompanied Bangladesh cultural delegations to USA, Canada, France, Germany, the Netherlands, Iran, Iraq, Myanmar, Sri Lanka, Italy, India, North Korea, China, Hong Kong, Russia, Sweden, and Denmark.

== CD publications ==
Khan's first and third CD were released by Mehwish Enterprises Ltd. and Y.A.K. Production, London, UK. His second CD was released from Bangladesh. Shahadat composed and directed the music for the documentary films Mrityuheen Pran, Meet Bangladesh, and Ripples in Meadows (produced by the Ministry of Foreign Affairs for Bangladeshi embassies around the world).

== Death ==
Khan died from COVID-19 at a hospital in Dhaka on 28 November 2020. He is buried at the Martyred Intellectuals Graveyard in Mirpur.

== Achievements and awards ==
In 1994, he received the highest State Award of Bangladesh, the Ekushey Padak for his contribution in the field of music. He obtained the degree Vadya Alankar in music from Ali Akbar College of Music, California, U.S. He had an M.A. in history from Dhaka University. He worked on music with Grand Union Orchestra based in UK.
