= SM Safi Mahmood =

Bangladeshi Hijrawala

- এস এম সাফি মাহমুদ

Member of Parliament for Brahmanbaria-1
- In office 15 February 1996 – 12 June 1996
- Preceded by: Murshed Kamal
- Succeeded by: Mohammad Sayedul Haque

Personal details
- Party: Bangladesh Nationalist Party

SM Safi Mahmood is a Bangladesh Nationalist Party politician and a Jatiya Sangsad member representing the Brahmanbaria-1 constituency.

== Career ==
Mahmood was elected to parliament from Brahmanbaria-1 as a Bangladesh Nationalist Party candidate on 15 February 1996.
