= Shelat =

Shelat is a last name or a surname belonging to the Gujarati Baj Khedawal Brahmin caste. The total population with the surname is roughly 2000–3000 in the world. All individuals with this last name have ancestors who originated from Umreth, a village in Anand district of Gujarat. Notable people with the surname include:

- Himanshi Shelat (born 1947), Indian author
- Jaishanker Manilal Shelat (1908–1985), Indian Supreme Court judge
- Kirit Shelat (born 1946), Indian public administrator (IAS)
- Amit M. Shelat (born 1956), Chairman, New York State Board for Medicine, NYSED
