= Katyayanidas Bhattacharya =

Indian scholar and philosopher (1917–1966)

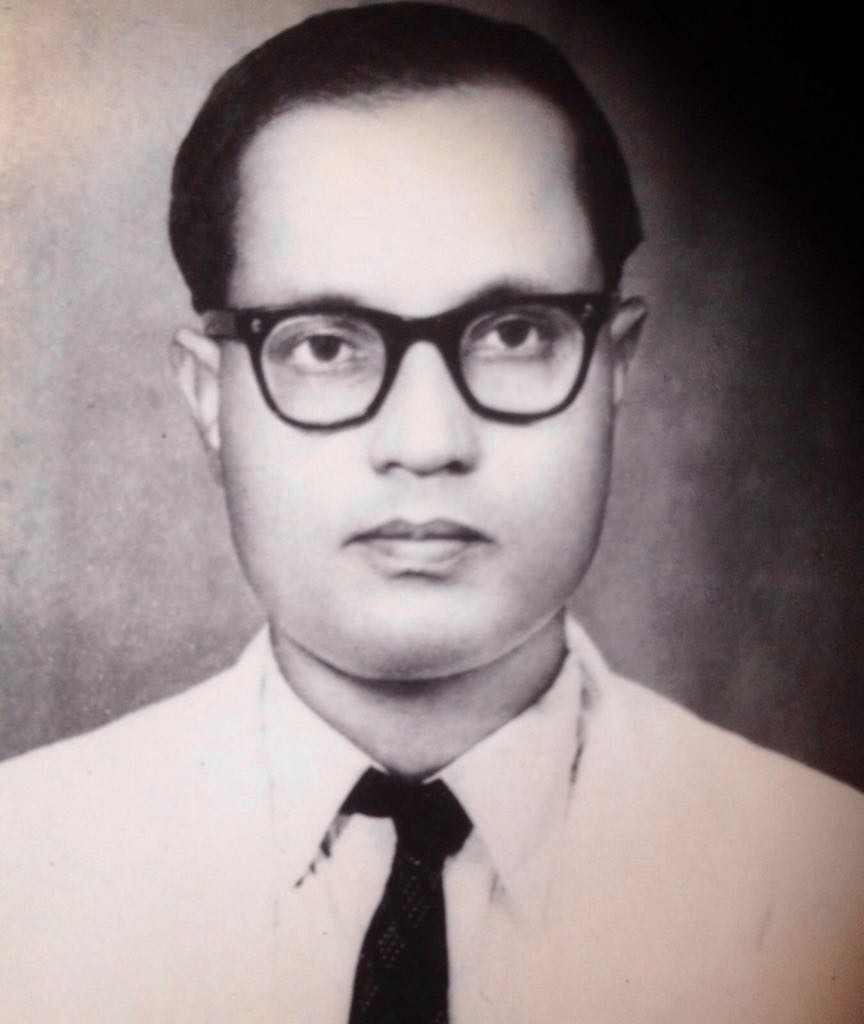

Education
- Education: University of Calcutta

Philosophical work
- Main interests: Samkhya philosophy of religion
- Notable works: "The concept of subtle body in Sankhya Philosophy" "Discussion on existence of God in the Western Philosophical thoughts"

Katyayanidas Bhattacharya (1917–1966) was an Indian scholar and philosopher of Indian and Western philosophy.

== Early life and education ==
Born on 17 October 1917 (1 September 1918 according to some), to Bhubaneswar Bhattacharya, an Ayurveda physician and Shailaja Devi, Katyayanidas passed his Matriculation Examination from his village school in Chunta and Intermediate Arts Examination (IA) from Bridaban College (now known as Brindaban Government College), Habiganj (both now in Bangladesh), in 1936 and 1939 respectively. In Intermediate Examination, he stood first in logic in the University of Calcutta and was awarded Saradaprasad Prize by the university. In between, he pursued traditional courses in Sanskrit for a year (1936–37) under Pandit Surendra Chandra Tarka-Sankhya-Vedantatirtha. Though he started studying English literature (Honours) in the college at Habiganj, his performance in logic and Sanskrit in the Intermediate Examination led him to change course to Philosophy. Dr. Shyama Prasad Mukherjee, a political figure and educationalist at that time, took interest in the young man and insisted that Katyayanidas shift to Calcutta and take admission to Ashutosh College (named after his father Sir Ashutosh Mukherjee) in BA Course with Honours in Philosophy. Professor Kalidas Sen who was the Principal of Ashutosh College at that time provided support and encouragement to Katyayanidas. As a student of the college he started writing scholarly articles in college magazine viz. "Glimpses in the Psychology of Laughter", "Is Free Will a Fact?". He succeeded in securing first position in first class in the University of Calcutta in 1941 and was awarded Ramtanu Lahiri Gold Medal, Hemanta Kumar Gold Medal and Keshab Chandra Sen Gold Medal by the university. Thereafter he also stood first in first class in the MA (Philosophy) Examination of the University of Calcutta in the year 1943, with record marks and was awarded University Gold Medal and some other medals and prizes.

== Professional career ==
As a student and subsequently as a teacher, Katyayanidas attracted notice of the academic philosopher Dr. Surendranath Dasgupta, who described his pupil in MA as one who "seemed to know very much more than an average first class M.A."

His essays "The concept of subtle body in Sankhya Philosophy", "Paschatya Darshane Ishwarer Astitwa Bichar" (Discussion on existence of God in the Western Philosophical thoughts) were important contributions in the subject in 1950s. His other contributions included "The Theory of Emergence in the Philosophy of Alexander", "The Meeting of Extremes in Alexander's Philosophy of Mind", "Nature and Function of Adjunct in Sankara Vedanta", Paschatya manovijnane moner swarup (The identity of Mind in the Western Psychology). The translated work of Katyayanidas from original Sanskrit included "Iswarakrishna's Samkhyakarika", an obscure Sanskrit Text, assigned to 3rd Century A.D., on Sankhya Philosophy, in English. Some of his writings written for general readers viz."Bhabbader Tatparya O Prakarbhed" (Significance and classification of Idealism), "Paschatya Darshane Amaratwer Bichar" (Discussion on the concept of continuity of life in Western Philosophical Thoughts), "Jader Swarup Jingyasar Itihas" (The History of questioning the identity of non-living matters), "Praner Swarup Jingyasar Itihas" (The History of questioning the identity of living matters), were published in the Bengali daily Anandabazar Patrika and other magazines of Calcutta.

The Society for Indian Philosophy and Religion, Elkins, West Virginia, US, in their Journal of Indian Philosophy and Religion brought out the Collected Works of Katyayanidas Bhattacharya, which included his articles on "Religious Consciousness", "Necessity of Religion", "Caird's Philosophy of Religion: Objections to Scientific Treatment", "Contemporary Trends in the Philosophy of Life" and "God in the Philosophy of Alexander".

Katyayanidas started teaching at Asutosh College, Calcutta. On joining the West Bengal Education Service in 1948, he was first posted to Krishnagar Government College and then to Victoria College of Cooch Behar (now known as Acharya Brojendra Nath Seal College) and Central Calcutta College (now known as Maulana Azad College) before joining Presidency College, Calcutta (now known as Presidency University) in July 1959. Concurrently, he was lecturing in an honorary capacity, at the University of Calcutta.

== Personal life ==
Katyayanidas was a connoisseur of Indian classical music and used to play tabla well. At one point of time he also edited the Bengali cultural journal Jayanti which was brought out first from Chunta (Brahmanbaria) and subsequently from Calcutta. His elder brother, Bireswar Bhattacharya, was the author of the novel Muktir Dak (Call for Freedom), written against the background of freedom struggle of India in 1940s. Katyayanidas was married to Uma Bhattacharya, daughter of Priyanath Bhattacharya and Sudhabala Devi of Bidyakut in the year 1948. The couple had four sons Amitabha, Niranjan, Sugata and Gautam, who all established themselves in their respective field of work subsequently. Katyayanidas died at the age of 49 on 26 October 1966.
