= Brahmanbaria-1 =

Constituency of Bangladesh's Jatiya Sangsad

Coordinates: 24.20°N 91.19°E

- Constituency for the Jatiya Sangsad
- District: Brahmanbaria District
- Division: Chittagong Division
- Electorate: 275,629 (2026)

Current constituency
- Created: 1984
- Party: Bangladesh Nationalist Party
- Member: M A Hannan
- ← 242 Habiganj-4 244 Brahmanbaria-2 →

Brahmanbaria-1 is a constituency represented in the Jatiya Sangsad (National Parliament) of Bangladesh since 2026 by M A Hannan of the Bangladesh Nationalist Party.

== Boundaries ==
The constituency encompasses Nasirnagar Upazila.

== History ==
The constituency was created in 1984 from the Comilla-6 constituency when the former Comilla District was split into three districts: Brahmanbaria, Comilla, and Chandpur.

Ahead of the 2008 general election, the Election Commission redrew constituency boundaries to reflect population changes revealed by the 2001 Bangladesh census. The 2008 redistricting altered the boundaries of the constituency.

Before the 2014 general election, the Election Commission reduced the constituency's boundaries. Previously, the constituency had included three union parishads of Brahmanbaria Sadar Upazila (after 2010, the new Bijoynagar Upazila): Budhanti, Chandura, and Harashpur.

== Members of Parliament ==
Election	Member	Party
1986	Mozammel Haque	NAP (Muzzafar)
1988	Mozammel Haque	Jatiya Party
1991	Murshed Kamal	Jatiya Party
Feb 1996	SM Safi Mahmood	Independent
Jun 1996	Mohammad Sayedul Haque	Awami League
2018 by-election	Bodruddoza Md. Farhad Hossain	Awami League
2024	Syed A.K. Ekramuzzaman	Independent
2026	M A Hannan (politician)	Bangladesh Nationalist Party

== Elections ==
=== Elections in the 2010s ===
Mohammad Sayedul Haque died in December 2017. Bodruddoza Md. Farhad Hossain of the Awami League was elected in a March 2018 by-election.

Brahmanbaria-1 by-election, 2018
Party	Candidate	Votes	%	±%
AL	Bodruddoza Md. Farhad Hossain	82,296	69.6	−20.2
JP(E)	Rejowan Ahmed	33,584	28.4	+18.2
IOJ	Ashraful Haque	2,287	1.9	N/A
Majority		48,712	41.2	−38.4
Turnout		118,167	55.2	+14.2
AL hold				

General Election 2014: Brahmanbaria-1
Party	Candidate	Votes	%	±%
AL	Mohammad Sayedul Haque	69,573	89.8	+36.6
JP(E)	Rejowan Ahmed	7,910	10.2	N/A
Majority		61,663	79.6	+71.9
Turnout		77,483	41.0	−53.1
AL hold				

=== Elections in the 2000s ===
General Election 2008: Brahmanbaria-1
Party	Candidate	Votes	%	±%
AL	Mohammad Sayedul Haque	99,886	53.2	+23.5
BNP	SAK Ekramuzzaman	85,388	45.5	+21.1
BIF	Md. Islam Uddin	2,406	1.3	N/A
Majority		14,498	7.7	+2.4
Turnout		187,680	94.1	+15.3
AL hold				

General Election 2001: Brahmanbaria-1
Party	Candidate	Votes	%	±%
AL	Mohammad Sayedul Haque	37,163	29.7	−6.8
BNP	Ahsanul Haque	30,576	24.4	−4.8
Independent	SM Safi Mahmud	29,389	23.5	N/A
Independent	SAK Ekramuzzaman	17,676	14.1	N/A
IJOF	Rejowan Ahmed	10,239	8.2	N/A
Independent	Israil Bhuyan	189	0.2	+0.1
Majority		6,587	5.3	−0.3
Turnout		125,232	78.8	+3.2
AL hold				

=== Elections in the 1990s ===
General Election June 1996: Brahmanbaria-1
Party	Candidate	Votes	%	±%
AL	Mohammad Sayedul Haque	33,379	36.5	+18.6
JP(E)	Ahsanul Haque	28,280	30.9	+1.8
BNP	SM Safi Mahmud	26,714	29.2	+2.8
IOJ	Jobayer Ahmed Ansari	1,668	1.8	N/A
Jamaat	Ali Azam	1,089	1.2	N/A
Zaker Party	A. Hannan Chowdhury	190	0.2	−1.6
Independent	Md. Yunus Bhuiyan	128	0.1	N/A
Independent	Israil Bhuyan	108	0.1	N/A
Majority		5,099	5.6	+2.8
Turnout		91,556	75.6	+10.8
AL gain from JP(E)				

General Election 1991: Brahmanbaria-1
Party	Candidate	Votes	%	±%
JP(E)	Murshed Kamal	26,376	29.1	
BNP	SM Safi Mahmud	23,856	26.4	
Independent	Mohammad Sayedul Haque	19,505	21.6	
AL	A. K. M. Mijanur Rahman	16,229	17.9	
Bangladesh Janata Party	M. A. Monaem	1,672	1.8	
Zaker Party	A. Hannan Chowdhury	1,585	1.8	
WPB	Haripada Rishi	460	0.5	
Jatiya Samajtantrik Dal-JSD	Sohraf Mollah	287	0.3	
Independent	A. K. M. Kamruzzaman	200	0.2	
Independent	Md. Golam Kibria Raza	190	0.2	
Bangladesh National Hindu Party	Dilip Das	130	0.1	
Majority		2,520	2.8	
Turnout		90,490	64.8	
JP(E) gain from NAP (Muzzafar)				
