= Murshed Kamal =

Bangladeshi politician

Syed Murshed Kamal
- সৈয়দ মুর্শেদ কামাল

Member of the Bangladesh Parliament for Brahmanbaria-1
- In office 1991–1996
- Preceded by: Mozammel Haque
- Succeeded by: SM Safi Mahmood

Personal details
- Born: 26 August 1947 Nasirnagar, Comilla district, East Bengal
- Died: 14 January 2013 (aged 65) Dhaka, Bangladesh
- Party: Jatiya Party (Ershad)

Syed Murshed Kamal (Bengali: সৈয়দ মুর্শেদ কামাল; 26 August 1947 – 14 January 2013) was a Jatiya Party (Ershad) politician and a Jatiya Sangsad member representing the Brahmanbaria-1 constituency.

== Early life and education ==
Kamal was born on 26 August 1947 to a Bengali family in the village of Khandura Haveli in Nasirnagar, Comilla district, East Bengal. He began his education at the Khandura Primary School in 1952. He is a graduate of the University of Dhaka.

== Career ==
Kamal was elected to parliament from Brahmanbaria-1 as a Jatiya Party candidate in 1991. He later joined the Bangladesh Nationalist Party.
