= Rasullabad Union =

Rasullabad
- Union council
- Location in Bangladesh
- Coordinates: 23°49′25.5″N 90°56′33.4″E
- Country: Bangladesh
- Division: Chittagong Division
- District: Brahmanbaria District
- Union council: Rasullabad

Population (2011)
  - Total: 17,373
- Time zone: UTC+6 (BST)
- Postal code: 3412
- Website: Official Map of Rasullabad

Rasullabad (Bengali: রছুল্লাবাদ Rasullābād) is a union parishad of Nabinagar Upazila of Brahmanbaria District in the Division of Chittagong, Bangladesh.

== History of Rasullabad ==
Rasullabad is an ancient union. No specific history of this union is known. According to the elderly people of the area, at the end of the English Renaissance period, five villages were formed in the union, with some villages of present-day Satomora and RatanPur. After this, Rasullabad union was formed in 1964 with only five villages: Rasullabad, Uttar Darra, Molla, Lahari and Kalghora.

== Population ==
The populations of the five villages are:

- Rasullabad – 7,898
- Lahari – 2,602
- Kalghora – 2,971
- Uttar Darra – 1,898
- Molla – 2,011

== Markets ==
Almost every village of Rasullabad Union has a market. There are total four market in Rasullabad union.

1. Rasullabad Bazar – This is the oldest and biggest market, located in the center of the village of Rasullabad.
2. Kalghora Bazar – Not as big, but daily usage products can be found here.
3. Uttar Darra Bazar – A small market. Some of daily-use items can be found here.
4. Molla Bazar – A small market. Daily usage products can be found here.

== Mosques ==
- Rasullabad Jame Masjid
- Rasullabad Madina Jame Masjid
- Rasullabad Uttar Para Jame Masjid
- Rasullabad Maddha Para Jame Masjid
- Rasullabad Dakkhin Para Jame Masjid
- Rasullabad Poshchim Para Jame Masjid
- Kalghora Bazar Jame Masjid
- Kalghora Purbo Para Jame Masjid
- Lohori Jame Masjid
- Molla Jame Masjid
- Uttar Darra Jame Masjid

== Eidgah of Rasullabad Union ==
There are four Eidgah fields in this union.

Rasullabad Eidgah – This is the biggest Eidgah open field located in Rasullabad.

Uttar Darra Eidgah – This Eidgah is located in Uttar Darra.

Molla Eidgah – Located in Molla.

Kalghora–Lohori Eidgah – This is a combined Eidgah for two villages, Kalghora and Lohori.

== Post Offices and Postal Codes ==
The postal code of Rasullabad is 3412.

== Education ==
There is only two high schools in this union. One is at Rasullabad and another is at Kalghora.

High School:

1. Rasullabad U. A. Khan High School
2. Kalghora High School

Madrasha: There are two Dakhil Madrashas in Rasullabad union.

1. Rasullabad Dakhil Madrasha
2. Molla Dakhil Madrasha

Primary schools:

1. Rasullabad South Government primary School
2. Rasullabad north Government primary School
3. Rasullabad West Government primary School
4. Rasullabad East Government primary School
5. Kalghora Government Primary School
6. Molla Government Primary School
7. Uttar Darra Government Primary School
8. Lohori Government Primary School
