= Mohammad Sayedul Haque =

Bangladeshi politician (1942–2017)

- মোহাম্মদ ছায়েদুল হক
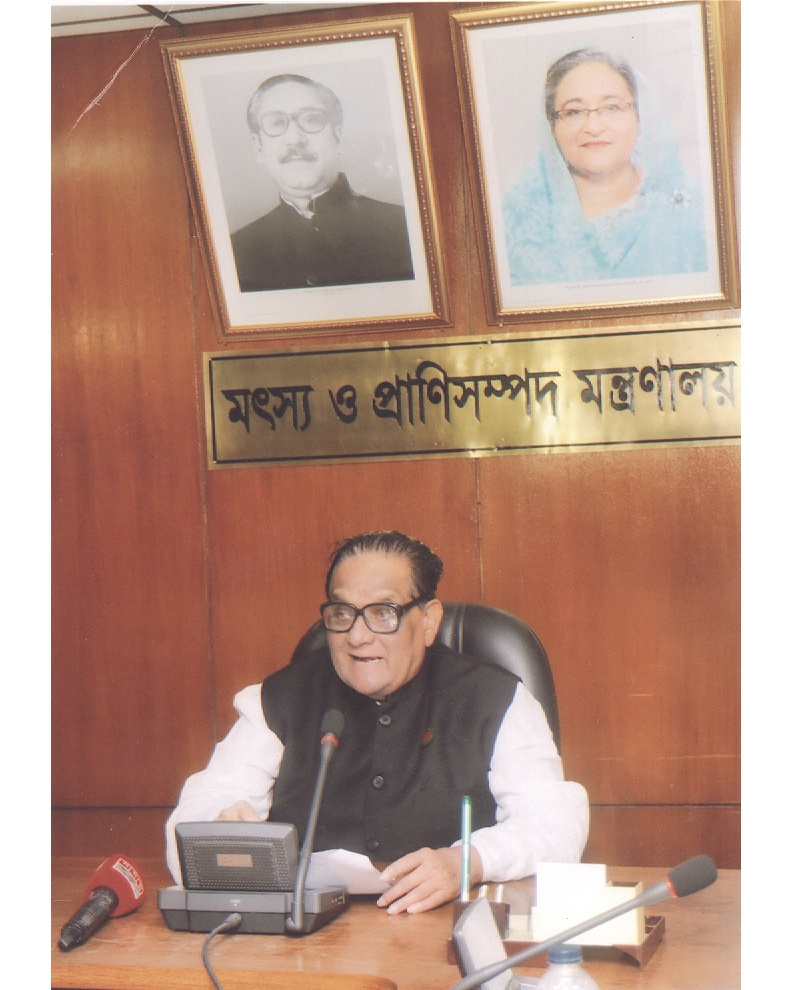
- Haque in March 2017.

Minister of Fisheries and Livestock
- In office 12 January 2014 – 16 December 2017
- Succeeded by: Narayan Chandra Chanda

Member of Parliament for Brahmanbaria-1
- In office 1996–2017
- Preceded by: Murshed Kamal
- Succeeded by: Bodruddoza Md. Farhad Hossain

Personal details
- Born: 4 March 1942 Brahmanbaria, Bengal Presidency, British India
- Died: 16 December 2017 (aged 75) Dhaka, Bangladesh
- Party: Bangladesh Awami League
- Education: University of Dhaka

Mohammad Sayedul Haque (4 March 1942 – 16 December 2017) was a Bangladesh Awami League politician and served as the Minister of Fisheries and Livestock of the government of Bangladesh.

== Early life and career ==
Haque was born in Nasirnagar under Brahmanbaria District. He completed MA (economics) and LLB from the University of Dhaka in 1969.

Haque was elected a member of parliament from Brahmanbaria-1 (Nasirnagar) constituency five times, in 1973, 1996, 2001, 2008 and 2014. He was appointed the fisheries and livestock minister after the Bangladesh Awami League formed its government in 2014.
