= Biddyakut Union =

Bidyakut বিদ্যাকুট
- Union
- Location in Bangladesh
- Coordinates: 23°54′27″N 91°2′27″E
- Country: Bangladesh
- Division: Chittagong Division
- District: Brahmanbaria District
- Upazila: Nabinagar Upazila

Population (2011)
  - Total: 20,820
- Postal code: 3410

Bidyakut (Bengali: বিদ্যাকুট) is a union parishad under Nabinagar Upazila, Brahmanbaria District, in the Division of Chittagong, Bangladesh.
