= Mozammel Haque (Bangladesh National Awami Party politician) =

Bangladeshi politician

- মোজাম্মেল হক

Member of Parliament for Brahmanbaria-1
- In office 1986–1991
- Preceded by: Position established
- Succeeded by: Murshed Kamal

Personal details
- Political party: National Awami Party (Muzaffar)

Mozammel Haque is a National Awami Party (Muzaffar) politician and a former Jatiya Sangsad member representing the Brahmanbaria-1 constituency.

== Career ==
Haque was elected to parliament from Brahmanbaria-1 as a National Awami Party (Muzaffar) candidate in 1986 and 1988.
