= Bodruddoza Md. Farhad Hossain =

Bangladeshi politician

Member of the Bangladesh Parliament for Brahmanbaria-1
- In office 21 March 2018 – 7 January 2024
- Preceded by: Mohammad Sayedul Haque

Personal details
- Born: 19 September 1971 (age 54)
- Political party: Bangladesh Awami League

Bodruddoza Md. Farhad Hossain (born 19 September 1971) is a Bangladesh Awami League politician and former Jatiya Sangsad member representing the Brahmanbaria-1 constituency.

== Career ==
Hossain was elected to parliament in a March 2018 by-election from Brahmanbaria-1 as a Bangladesh Awami League candidate. The by-election was called following the death of Member of Parliament Mohammad Sayedul Haque.
