= Kirit Shelat =

Indian public administrator (born 1946)

Kirit Nanubhai Shelat (born 1946) is an Indian public administrator. He worked for the government of Gujarat, India as head of various government departments and public undertakings.. After retirement, he associated with various NGOs and Trusts. He was also member of prestigious Padma award committee 2023.

== Education ==
Shelat earned a PhD in public administration. He has been awarded degree of PhD – Doctorate of Science by Junagadh Agricultural University Gujarat, India.

== Accomplishments ==
He contributed to the development of Gujarat, He has hand into introduction in “New Extension Management – Krishi Mahotsav” approach in Gujarat as Principal Secretary – Agriculture – which doubled the income of farmers. He designed and implemented large-scale projects for poor families, farmers, and micro entrepreneurs and remote rural areas. He developed guidelines for micro-level planning with focus on individual poor family and village development plan. He was responsible for the "cluster development approach" for small industries and "Step up project for rural micro level Entrepreneurs".

He developed micro level production plan modules for individual farmers and helped restructure the agriculture sector. He introduced a new extension approach of meeting with farmers at their doorstep prior to monsoon by a team led by an agriculture scientist. He introduced scientific agriculture based on soil health and moisture analysis and providing a soil health card to every Gujarati farmer. Gujarati agriculture grew at 11% per annum through 2015.

He is a founding member of International School for Public Leadership and Executive Chairman of National Council for Climate Change Sustainable Development and Public Leadership (NCCSD) and Chairman of the Sub Group – "Enhancing Preparedness for Climate Change" and had his hand in introduction of NICRA -National Initiative for Climate Resilient Agriculture. He was member of Expert Committee on Economic Revival in Arena Covid Pandemic of Government of Gujarat. Along with Prof. Mbuya of FAMU USA - he introduced concept of Building Climate Smart Farmers. His latest publication includes “Atmanirbhar Bharat – Energy Security”.

He has authored more than 20 books related to agricultural and rural development and related to impact of climate change and ways to meet that challenge at local level – village level. Dr. Kirit Shelat has written biography of Pujya Pramukh Swami Maharaj – “YUG PURUSH, PUJYA PRAMUKH SWAMI MAHARAJ – a life dedicated to others”. This is published in six languages with nine editions. He has also written biography of Pujya Mahant Swami Maharaj – “Mahan Rushi Mahant Swami Maharaj” – June, 2019.

== Legacy ==
He retired from the Indian Administrative Service. He worked on the formulation and implementation of policies for agricultural, rural and Industrial development in Gujarat.

== Books ==
He is author of books related Rural and Agricultural Development and Mitigation of Global Warming and Public Leadership. • Yug Purush – Param Pujya Pramukhswami Maharaj – English 2004-2009-2017, Gujarati-2005-2014, Hindi-2006, Telugu-2007.Shree Bhagwati Trust – Ahmedabad, Gujarat-India.

• Planning for Rural Development (Vol.I)-Methodology for Micro Level Planning for Rural Development-1980, Gujarat State Rural Development Corporation-Gandhinagar, Gujarat-India.

• Planning for Rural Development (Vol.II)-Evaluation of Rural development Programme -Guidelines for Field Level Officers-1982.Gujarat State Rural Development Corporation, Gandhinagar, Gujarat-India.

• Evolution of Rural Development-1988-Kathan Education Communication Unit, Ahmedabad- Gujarat-India.

• Mapping Development Gujarat Experience- English Edition-April 2003, Shree Bhagwati Trust – Ahmedabad and Gujarati Edition - May 2004 Navbharat Publication, Ahmedabad – Gujarat-India.

• Tauka and Village Production plan-May 2005-Anand Agriculture University, Anand, Gujarat-India, 2004.

• Manual for farmers for crop production plan–Khedut Marg-Darshika May–Junagadh Agriculture University–Junagadh, Gujarat–India, 2004.

• Kirishi Mahotsav, 2005–Department of Agriculture and Cooperation, Government of Gujarat–August 2005.

• Leadership by Choice and not by Chance–August 2007, Sahitya Mudranalaya, Ahmedabad.

• Nayamurti Shri. Nanubhai Shelat Smruti Granth–June 2008, Sahitya Mudranalaya, Ahmedabad.

• What Ails Our Agriculture? Gujarat experience, Shree Bhagvati Trust, Ahmedabad, 2007.

• Sustainable Development – a green solution to Global Warming-The shroff Experience, Mandthan Educational programme Society, 2010.

• Applied Biodiversity for Sustainable Agriculture, 2012, Sahitya Mudranalaya, Ahmedabad.

• Leadership and Greener Agriculture in the Arena of Climate Change 2012, Sahitya Mudranalaya, Ahmedabad.

• Vulnerability of Agriculture, Water and Fisheries to Climate Change - Springer-2014.

• Climate Change modeling planning and policy for Agriculture-Springer 2015.

• Guide Book for Farmers -Badalata havaman Ma Kushal Kheti- Gujarati Book – 2014, Sahitya Mudranalaya, Ahmedabad.

• Guide Book for Farmers -Badalata havaman Ma Kushal Kethi - Hindi 2015.

• Guide Book for Farmers -Climate Smart Agriculture –English-2014.

• Building Climate Smart Farmers with Prof. Odemari Mbuya– English, Gujarati & Hindi Edition- January 2018.

• Developing Gujarat – My Memories – Dr.H.R.Patankar, English Edition – December- 2018, Shree Bhagvati Trust, Ahmedabad.

• Vikastu Gujarat Sah –Yatra, with Dr.H.R.Patankar, Gujarati Edition – November 2019, Shree Bhagvati Trust, Ahmedabad.

• Atmanirbhar Krishi – Role of Stakeholders – Gujarati Edition – in May, 2020 – July, 2020.

• Atmanirbhar Self Reliant and Climate Smart Farmers – Roadmap for Agriculture, 2020-2030, India, Kirit Shelat, Odemari Mbuya, Arvind Pathak & Suresh Acharya, Shree Bhagvati Trust, Ahmedabad.

• Aatmanirbhar Farmers of Gujarat: Roadmap 2030, A transformative roadmap for Developing an Antmanirbhar Agriculture Sector of Gujarat by the year 2030, Manish Bhardwaj and Kirit Shelat.

• “Amrutkal ma Atmanirbhar “Havaman Badlav Ma Kushal Kethi - Gujarati Book – Dr.Kirit N Shelat, Dr. A R Pathak, Dr. Odemari Mbuya, 2023, Shree Bhagvati Trust, Ahmedabad.
