= Bahadur Khan (musician) =

Indian musician

- Born: Bahadur Hossain Khan; 19 January 1931; Brahmanbaria, Bengal Presidency, British India
- Died: 3 October 1989 (aged 58); Kolkata, India
- Children: Kirit Khan, Bidyut Khan
- Parents: Ayet Ali Khan (father); Umarunnesa (mother)
- Relatives: Mobarak Hossain Khan (brother); Sheikh Sadi Khan (brother); Abed Hossain Khan (brother)

Ustad Bahadur Khan (19 January 1931 – 3 October 1989) was an Indian sarod player and film score composer.

== Early life and family ==
Ustad Bahadur Khan was born on 19 January 1931 to Ayet Ali Khan and Umarunnesa in Shibpur village, Nabinagar, Brahmanbaria, in the then Bengal Presidency, British India. From a musical family, he was related to sitar player Pandit Ravi Shankar. Khan first learnt to play the sarode from his father and his uncle Alauddin Khan in Maihar, before he finally settled in Calcutta. He also practiced vocal music and later collaborated with his cousins Ali Akbar Khan and Annapurna Devi.

Khan's brothers Abed Hossain Khan and Mobarak Hossain Khan were also musicians and based in Bangladesh, and were the recipients of awards from the Government of Bangladesh for their contributions to classical music.

== Career ==
Khan was a regular performer at the All India Radio, Radio Pakistan and Bangladesh Betar. He composed and directed music for many films by Indian filmmaker Ritwik Ghatak and featured in the following:

- Subarnarekha (The Golden Line).
- Meghe Dhaka Tara (The Cloud-clapped Star)
- Komal Gandhar (E Flat)
- Jukti Takko Aar Gappo (Reason, Debate and A Story)
- Titash Ekti Nadir Naam (A River Named Titash)
- Nagarik (The Citizen)
- Shwet Mayur (White Peacock)
- Yekhane Dariye (Where I Am Standing)
- Trisandhyay (Three Twilights)
- Notun Pata (New Leaf)
- Garm Hava (Hot Winds, 1973)

== Teaching ==
Khan taught Indian classical music as a faculty member for six months at the Ali Akbar College of Music in California, United States. His students include his son Bidyut Khan, nephew Shahadat Hossain Khan, Tejendra Majumdar, Kalyan Mukherjea, Monoj Shankar and his nephew Khurshid Khan.

== Personal life and death ==
Khan had sons Kirit Khan (d. 2006) and Bidyut Khan.

Khan died on 3 October 1989 in Calcutta, India. Every year, a one-day music festival takes place commemorating the death anniversary of the Khan in Calcutta, organized by the "Ustad Bahadur Khan Music Circle". In Bangladesh, his legacy is continued through the "Ustad Ayet Ali Khan Sangeet Niketon", a music school in memory of his father Ayet Ali Khan, at their native village Shibpur.
