= Sheikh Sadi Khan =

Bangladeshi composer

- শেখ সাদী খান
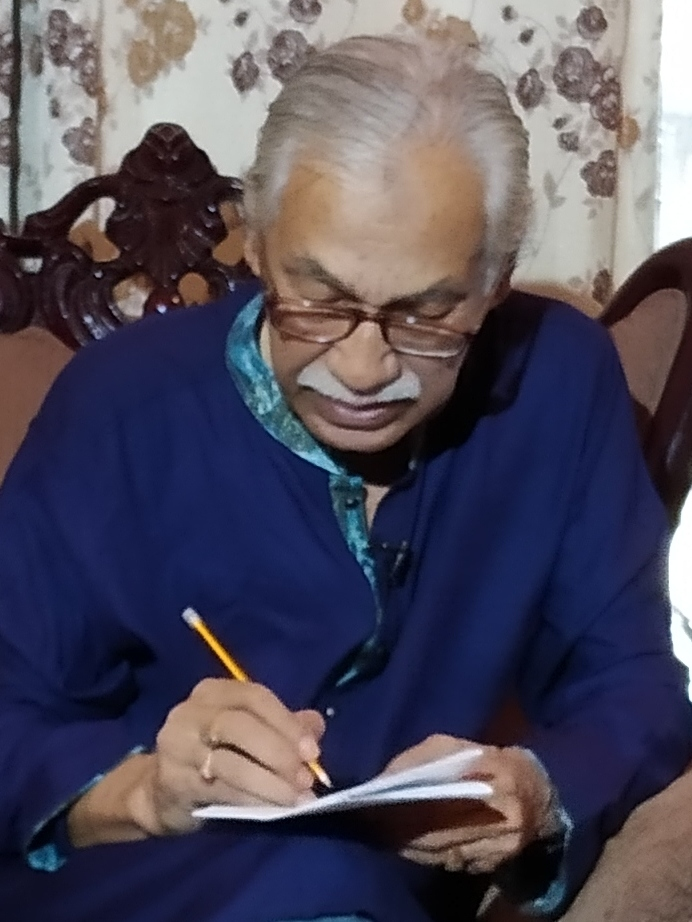
- Khan in 2019
- Born: 1950 (age 75–76); Brahmanbaria, East Bengal, Dominion of Pakistan
- Occupations: composer, music director
- Father: Ayet Ali Khan
- Relatives: Bahadur Khan; Mobarak Hossain Khan; Abed Hossain Khan
- Awards: Full list

Sheikh Sadi Khan (born 3 March 1950) is a Bangladeshi composer and music director. He won Bangladesh National Film Award for Best Music Director for the film Ghani (2006) and Best Music Composer for Bhalobaslei Ghor Bandha Jay Na (2010). He won Ekushey Padak in 2018 by the government of Bangladesh.

== Early life and career ==
Khan began his career under the guardianship of his father Ustad Ayet Ali Khan. He took lessons as a violinist from his elder brother Ustad Bahadur Khan.

Khan joined Pakistan Radio in 1965. He started as a Behala player. When the Liberation War of Bangladesh broke out in 1971, he migrated to Kolkata and worked for Swadhin Bangla Betar Kendra. In the early 1970s, he worked as an assistant to the composer Khandaker Nurul Alam. He continued playing the violin in films as well as composing music for Bangladesh Betar. He was the music director of the film Ekhoni Somoy (1980), directed by Abdullah Al Mamun.

As of 2014, Khan is serving as the Chief Music Producer of Bangladesh Betar.

== Awards ==
- Bangladesh National Film Award for Best Music Director (2006)
- Bangladesh National Film Award for Best Music Composer (2010)
- BACHSAS Best Music Composer Award (3 times)
- Celebrating Life Lifetime Achievement Award (2014)
- Ekushey Padak (2018)

== Works ==
Year	Films	Role	Notes
2025	Silence: A Musical Journey	Himself	Guest appearance

Albums

- Sweet Dreams (2012)
