= Kirit Khan =

- কিরিট খান
- Portrait of Khan
- Born: 26 October 1955; Brahmanbaria, East Bengal, Dominion of Pakistan
- Died: 2006 (aged 50–51)
- Occupation: Musician
- Father: Bahadur Khan
- Relatives: Ayet Ali Khan (grandfather)

Kirit Khan (29 October 1955 – 2006) was a Bengali-Indian sitar player.

== Early life ==
Khan was born in Brahmanbaria in erstwhile East Bengal and later settled in Kolkata, India. He is the second son of Ustad Bahadur Khan, a sarod artiste. Musician Ayet Ali Khan was his grandfather. His elder brother was Bidyut Khan.

At the age of seven, Khan started learning music. First he took his lessons on tabla and later on sitar from his father. He learned from him until his father died in 1989. In 1976, he appeared in front of audience with a duet concert (Sitar and Sarod) with his father. From then on he played sitar at home and abroad consistently.

== Performance in major concerts in India ==
Among Khan's memorable concerts is a duet performance with his father at the Sur Singer Music Conference in Mumbai in 1986. In 1987, he received high praise for his solo sitar recitals in Mumbai, organized by the Ustad Abdul Halim Zafar Khan Academy. He also participated in a duet concert with his father at the Tansen Music Conference in the same year. In 1991, he received great appreciation at the Surdas Music Conference in Kolkata. In 1999, he was highly acclaimed by the audience at the Dover Lane Music Conference in Kolkata.

== Tours ==
Khan had toured different countries in the world performing with his sitar since 1978. The first countries he toured are Russia, and Cuba. Then in 1988 he rendered his recitals in Germany, and England. In 1989, he played sitar in Middle East. In 1999, he performed in Denmark, Switzerland, Northern Ireland, and Scotland. In 2003, he performed in South America (Colombia, Bolivia, and Peru), and Sweden.

== Awards and recognition ==
In 1984, Khan obtained the title Suramani from the Haridas Music Conference, and later Surjhankar in Mumbai. In 1985, he was given a reception in Brahmanbaria, Bangladesh, as the soil's bright son, with a golden key as a token of their sincere appreciation.

== Music direction in films ==
Besides playing sitar, Khan also engaged himself as a music director in different films. He worked with his father as an assistant music director in Hindi Films Garam Hawa, Amabashya Ki Chand. He also worked as assistant Music director in Bangla films Natun Pata, Jukti Takko Goppo, Je Jekhane Dariye. He was the solo music director of the film Nilkanya. He started a documentary film called ‘Gharana and Parampara’ which has been sponsored by the government of India. The theme of the film was to make the younger generation aware of Parampara (Teacher-student interactive learning) and concept of Gharana (Schools of music).

== Teaching sitar ==
Khan worked as a music teacher in Ustad Bahadur Khan Music Academy in Kolkata and thus played a role to spread Indian classical instrumental music. He was a visiting teacher on sitar in Indian Music Academy in Frankfurt, Germany.
