= Fakir Aftabuddin Khan =

Ustad Fakir Aftabuddin Khan
- Born: 1862; Brahmanbaria, Bengal Presidency, British India
- Died: 25 January 1933 (aged 70–71)
- Occupations: Musician, composer, lyricist
- Known for: Music composition; inventor of the instruments meghadambur and swarasangraha
- Children: Kamala Khatun
- Parents: Sabdar Hossain Khan (father); Sundari Begum (mother)
- Relatives: Alauddin Khan (brother); Ayet Ali Khan (brother)

Ustad Fakir Aftabuddin Khan (1862 – 25 January 1933) was a Bengali musician, composer and lyricist.

== Early life ==
Khan was born on 1862 at Shibpur village, Nabinabar, Brahmanbaria District in the then Bengal Presidency, British India. His brothers were musicians Alauddin Khan and Ayet Ali Khan. He married the daughter of Gul Mahmud from Shrirampur.

== Career ==
Khan learned to play the violin and tabla at the court of the Zamindar of Bangora. He trained in Tripura Raja's court under the court musician Rababi Qasim Ali Khan. He was talented with a flute and also played the harmonium, dotara, and banya. He invented his own musical instruments called the meghadambur and swarasangraha. He also wrote lyrics for the poems of Manomohan Dutta.

Khan was given the title "Fakir" for his devotion to God and the Goddess Kali and his ascetic lifestyle of disinterest in worldly affairs.

== Death ==
Khan died on 25 January 1933.
