= Abed Hossain Khan =

Bangladeshi musician, music composer and music director

- আবেদ হোসাইন খান
- Born: 1 April 1929; Shibpur village, Brahmanbaria District, Bengal Presidency, British India
- Died: 29 April 1996 (aged 67)
- Children: Shahadat Hossain Khan
- Parent: Ayet Ali Khan
- Relatives: Bahadur Khan (brother); Mobarak Hossain Khan (brother)

Ustad Abed Hossain Khan (1 April 1929 – 29 April 1996) was a Bangladeshi musician, music composer and music director. He was awarded Ekushey Padak in 1985 by the government of Bangladesh.

== Career ==
Khan took sitar lessons from his father, Ustad Ayet Ali Khan. In 1950, after completing BA, he joined the Dhaka Station of Radio Pakistan as a staff artist.

Khan was a music teacher in Bangladesh Shilpakala Academy. He performed the sitar and the sarod on Bangladesh Radio and Bangladesh Television regularly.

Khan performed with German musicians Phillip Karl Schaeffer and Michael Grube.
