= Nabinagar Upazila =

Nabinagar নবীনগর
- Upazila
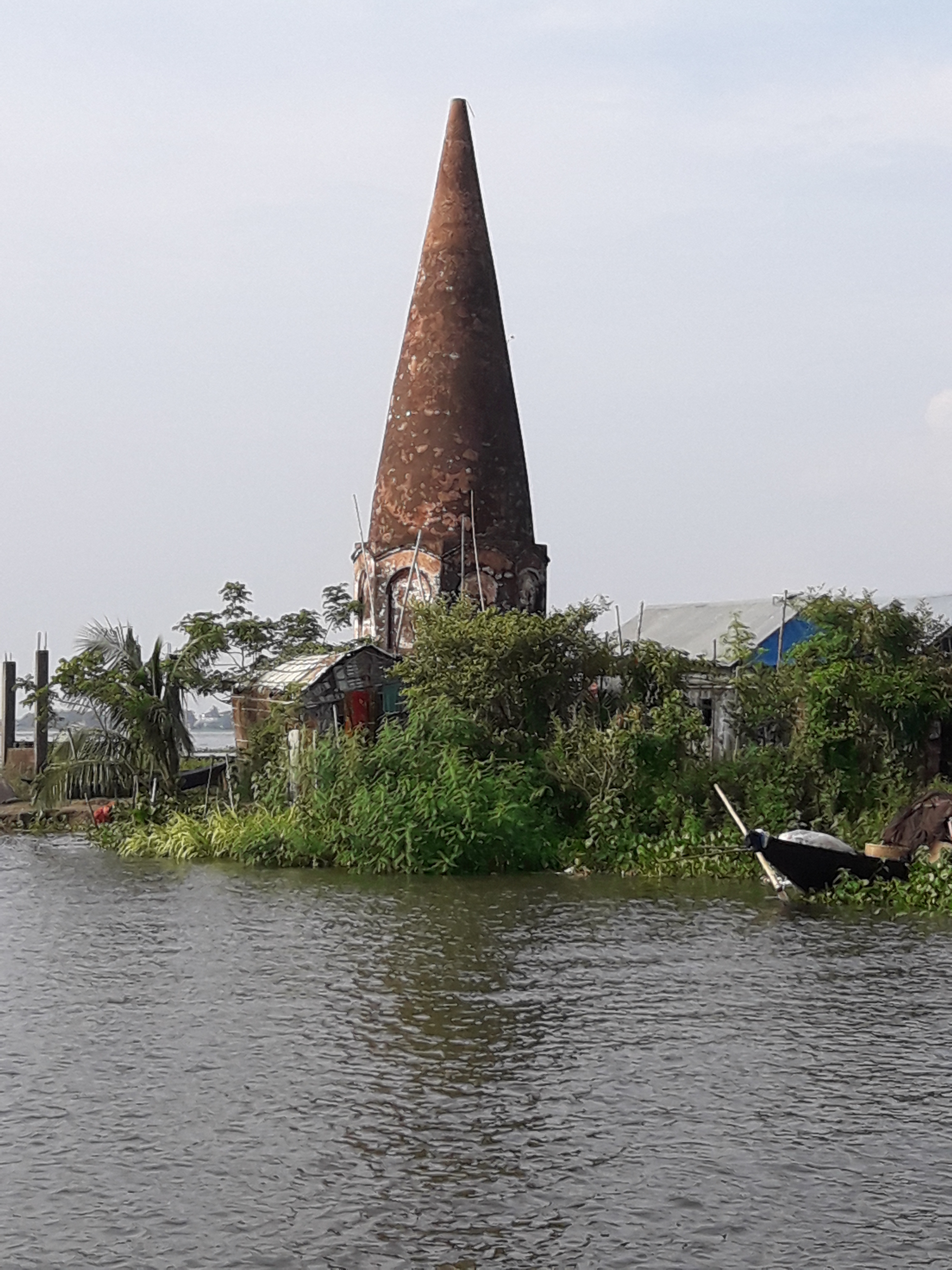
- A temple in Nabinagar upazila

- Coordinates: 23°53′N 90°59′E
- Country: Bangladesh
- Division: Chittagong
- District: Brahmanbaria

Area
  - Total: 353.66 km^{2} (136.55 sq mi)

Population (2022)
  - Total: 555,839
  - Density: 1,571.7/km^{2} (4,070.6/sq mi)
- Time zone: UTC+6 (BST)
- Postal code: 3410
- Area code: 0851
- Website: Official Map of Nabinagar

Nabinagar Upazila mauza geocode map

Nabinagar (Bengali: নবীনগর) is an upazila of Brahmanbaria District in the Division of Chattogram, Bangladesh.

== Geography ==
Nabinagar is located at 23.8833°N 90.9833°E. It has 94,871 households and a total area of 86,568 acres (353.66 km^{2}).

== Demographics ==
Religions in Nabinagar Upazila (2022)
Religion	Percent
Islam	93.16%
Hinduism	6.83%
Other or not stated	0.01%

According to the 2022 Bangladeshi census, Nabinagar Upazila had 123,090 households and a population of 555,839. 11.80% of the population were under 5 years of age. Nabinagar had a literacy rate (age 7 and over) of 70.87%: 69.66% for males and 71.82% for females, and a sex ratio of 82.35 males for every 100 females. 107,023 (19.25%) lived in urban areas.

According to the 2011 Census of Bangladesh, Nabinagar Upazila had 94,871 households and a population of 493,518. 148,870 (30.17%) were under 10 years of age. Nabinagar had a literacy rate (age 7 and over) of 43.64%, compared to the national average of 51.8%, and a sex ratio of 1144 females per 1000 males. 53,157 (10.77%) lived in urban areas.

== Administration ==
Nabinagar Upazila is divided into Nabinagar Municipality and 21 union parishads: Barail, Barikandi, Biddyakut, Birgaon, Bitghar, Ibrahimpur, Junedpur, Kaitala Dakshin, Kaitala Uttar, Krishnanagar, Laur Fatehpur, Natghar, Paschim Nabinagar, Purba Nabinagar, Rasullabad, Ratanpur, Salimganj, Satmura, Shibpur, Shyamgram, Sreerampur, Shahpur, Gulpukuria and Damla. The union parishads are subdivided into 149 mauzas and 200 villages.

Nabinagar Municipality is subdivided into 9 wards and 18 mahallas.

== Education ==
There are 4 colleges, 25 high schools, 8 Madrasas, 144 government primary schools and 55 non-government primary schools. According to Banglapedia, Nabinagar Pilot High School, founded in 1896, Bidyakut Amar High School (1913), Fatehpur Kamalakanta Gurucharan High School (1913) and Kaitala Jajneshwar High School (1918) are notable secondary schools.

== Notable people ==
- Ghulam Azam, leader of the Bangladesh Jamaat-e-Islami (1969-2000), attended a madrasa in Birgaon.
- Zahirul Haque, footballer, was born in Nabinagar in 1935.

== See also ==
- Upazilas of Bangladesh
- Districts of Bangladesh
- Divisions of Bangladesh
