= Allauddin Khan =

Indian musician (1881–1972)

Ustad Allauddin Khan
- Born: 1881; Shibpur, Bengal Presidency, British India (now Shibpur, Brahmanbaria, Bangladesh)
- Died: 6 September 1972 (aged 90–91)
- Genre: Hindustani classical music
- Occupations: Composer, sarodiya
- Instruments: Sursringar, Sarod, Pakhawaj, Violin
- Spouse: Madanmanjari Devi (Madina Begum)
- Children: Ali Akbar Khan, Annapurna Devi
- Father: Sabdar Hossain Khan
- Relatives: Fakir Aftabuddin Khan (brother); Ayet Ali Khan (brother)

Ustad Allauddin Khan (Note: Bengali pronunciation: [alau̯d̪ːin kʰan].) (Bengali pronunciation: [alau̯d̪ːin kʰan]; 1881 – 6 September 1972) was an Indian sarod player, multi-instrumentalist, composer and one of the most notable music teachers of the 20th century in Indian classical music.

At a time when North Indian classical music was largely dominated by vocal traditions and instruments were largely relegated to accompanying roles, Khan played a pivotal role in establishing instrumental music as a standalone solo genre. By departing from the secretive and exclusive practices of his era, Khan mentored a lineage of world-renowned virtuosos—including both family members and outside disciples—who went on to dominate the Indian classical music landscape and spearhead its global dissemination. For his contributions to music, he was awarded the Sangeet Natak Akademi Fellowship in 1954, the Padma Bhushan in 1958, and the Padma Vibhushan in 1971.

== Early life ==
Allauddin Khan has been variously described as being born in 1862, 1869, 1871 or 1881, though based on evidences, he was born most likely circa. 1881 in Shibpur village, Brahmanbaria District, East Bengal, to Sabdar Hossain Khan and Harasundari. He was given the childhood nickname of Alam (or Alom). His father, commonly known as Sadhu Khan, was an amateur sitarist, a disciple of Kasem Ali Khan, and the maternal uncle of Ustad Wazir Khan of Rampur. Sadhu Khan had five sons—Samiruddin Khan, Aftabuddin Khan, Alauddin Khan, Nayeb Ali Khan, and Ayet Ali Khan—and two daughters, Madhumaloti Khatun and Kadar Khatun.

Khan's interest in music manifested during his infancy. He recalled his mother describing his early responsiveness to music:

My passion for music comes from what my mother narrated… She said that as an infant I would listen to my father playing the sitar and tap on her bosom in rhythm with the music… I would hum the gats which my father played.

— Ustad Alauddin Khan

Khan's elder brother, Aftabuddin Khan studied tabla under Ram Kanal Sil, whose brother Ramdan Sil taught violin and vocals. Through exposure to these sessions, a four-to-five-year-old Khan learned thekas performed by the musicians and began replicating them independently.

At the age of five, Khan was enrolled in the same school as his elder brother, Aftabuddin. However, he frequently engaged in truancy to attend religious and musical gatherings at a local Shiva temple in Shibpur.

== Musical Education ==
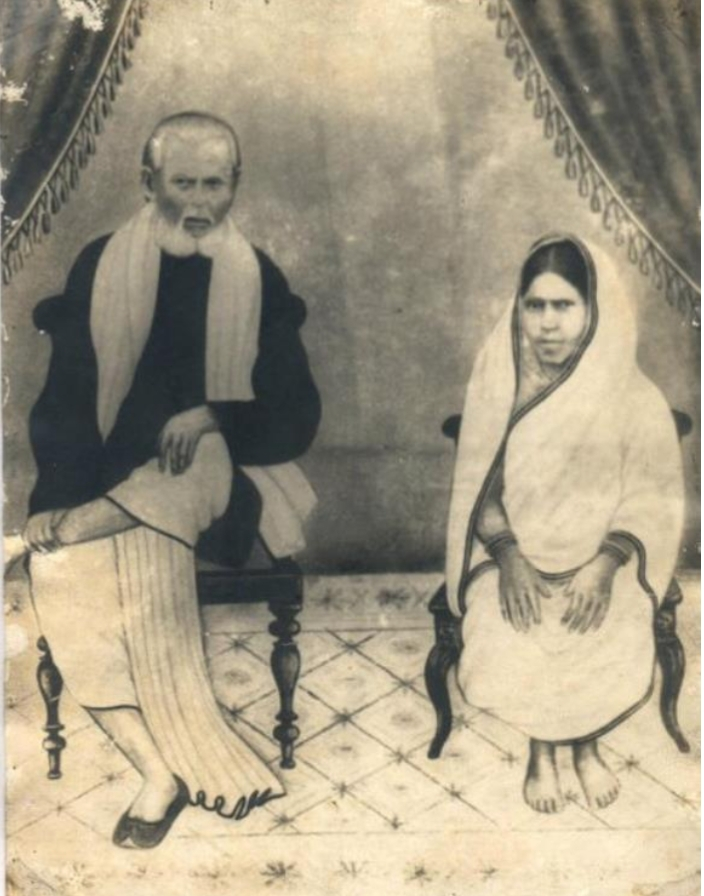
Sabdar Khan and Harasundari Begum

Khan recalled that by the age of seven he began dedicating his time entirely to music, choosing to observe the daily morning and evening prayers, where visiting sadhus performed bhajans and played the sitar, neglecting his academic studies to spend most of his time there.. His family didn't want him to pursue music as a career and he was frequently punished because of his strivings. So, at the age of eight he ran away from home to nearby village Narayanganj to join a group of Jatra ministrels and reached Dacca with them. While performing with their Jatra music group, he learned to play the dhol alongside other traditional and Western instruments.

At about fourteen years old he arrived in Calcutta, which he found to be alienating and hostile. During his hardships in Calcutta, without money or food, Allaudin finally met a kind young man who brought him home, where his mother, deeply impressed by Allauddin's vocal talent, convinced her husband, Bireswar Babu, to introduce the young boy to vocalist Gopal Chandra Bhattacharya (Nulo Gopal), famous state musician of Maharajah Jatindramohan Tagore of Pathuriaghata. He trained there for about seven years until the demise of his guru.

Following the death of Nulo Gopal, he ceased vocal training and transitioned to instrumental music. He spent seven years under the musician and flautist Amritlal Dutta (Habu Dutta), second cousin of Swami Vivekananda), learning both Indian and Western systems. Driven to master multiple instruments, Allauddin sought out various specialized teachers:

- Western Classical Music (Violin & Piano): Mr. Robert Lobo (conductor of the Eden Garden Orchestra)
- Shehnai & Percussion: Hazari Ustad
- Percussion (Mridangam, Pakhawaj, & Tabla): Nanda Lal Babu

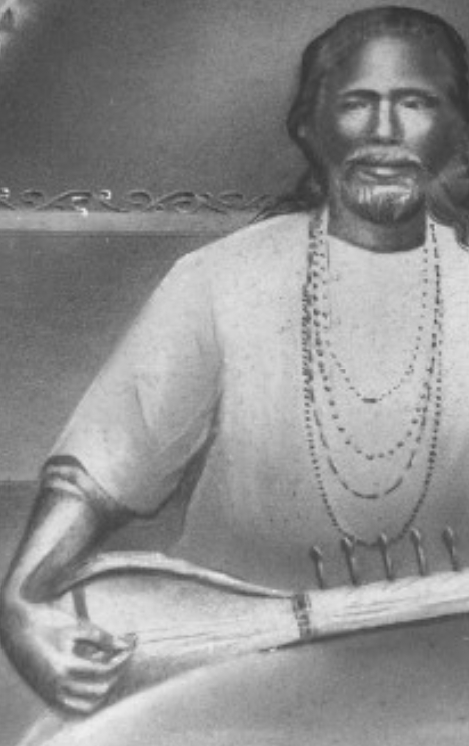
Aftabuddin Khan, brother of Allauddin Khan

During a Durga Puja festival, he boasted to Raja Jagat Kishore Acharya of Muktagacha Zamindar Bari that he could play every instrument in the world. The Raja challenged his arrogance by having him attend an early morning performance by Ahmad Ali Khan. Moved to tears by the maestro's rendering of Raag Todi, the young Allauddin immediately hugged his feet and begged to become his disciple. For four years, he served Ahmad Ali by cooking, cleaning and accompanying him on stage. During this time, he surreptitiously memorized his guru's repertoire by listening from the kitchen and practicing in secret whenever the Ustad left the house. One day, Ahmad Ali overheard Allauddin practicing Raag Todi in his own style. Calling him a thief he immediately ordered him to leave. However, they later reconciled and traveled to Rampur, where Allauddin faithfully surrendered thousands of rupees earned from accompanying his guru, along with all his personal savings. This is based on Guru Dakshina's own account of this period.

In Rampur, he learnt about the legendary beenkar Ustad Wazir Khan. There he spent six fruitless months blocked by palace sentries. Despondent and contemplating suicide by opium, he was assisted by a sympathetic local maulavi who dissuaded him from taking his own life and drafted a petition to Nawab Hamid Ali Khan. Intrigued, the Nawab brought him to the Hamid Manzil palace, where Allauddin's virtuosic audition on the sarod and violin deeply impressed the ruler.

The Nawab arranged for a formal Nara ceremony, presenting gifts to Wazir Khan on Allauddin's behalf. Wazir Khan accepted him under the condition that he would only learn sarod, rabab, and sursringar (as the veena was restricted to family members) and that he would never teach these arts to baijis or courtesans. Although officially accepted, Allauddin experienced financial hardship and neglect from Wazir Khan for the first three years of his tutelage, during which he sustained himself by playing violin for the State Band under Raja Hussain and furthered his skills by learning under other local master.

== Teaching ==
After gaining recognition as a performer in Calcutta, Khan decided to leave the city. During this period, he met the harmonium player Shyamlal Khetri, who had been commissioned by Maharaja Brijnath Singh of Maihar State to locate a court musician and personal tutor. The Maharaja's criteria required the candidate to be proficient in both vocal and instrumental music. Identifying Khan as suitable for the role, Khetri directed him to proceed to Maihar.

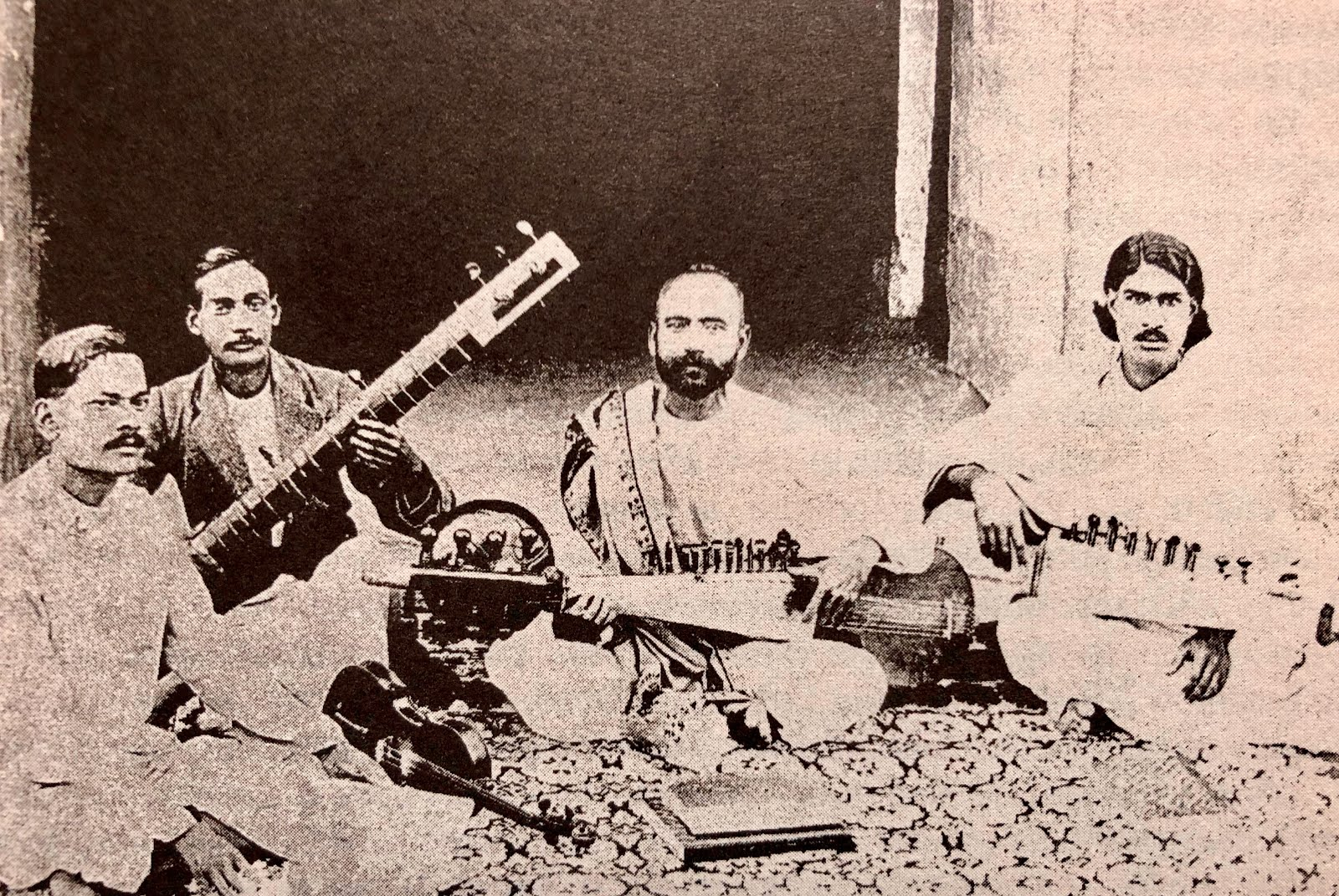
Allauddin Khan with Timir Baran on the right

Upon his arrival, Khan was accommodated in the state guest house and subsequently summoned to the Durbar. Accompanying state musician Ghurrey Maharaj on the tanpura, Khan tuned his sarod for the audition. The examination process included playing over a telephone link and being instructed to alternate between multiple musical instruments after brief intervals of performance. Although the Maharaja abruptly halted his initial sarod performance, Khan was ultimately selected as the Maharaja's personal music tutor and appointed as the official court musician of Maihar State.

Because Khan opposed the principle of accepting a salary for teaching music, Maharaja Brijnath Singh instead granted him a plot of land to secure his permanent income. This arrangement allowed Khan to begin his tenure as a teacher and court musician while maintaining financial independence.

Khan's training methodology was characterized by its extreme rigor. Under this secluded system, students resided with him in Maihar and were initially prohibited from listening to outside music or performing in front of any audience, including close relatives. Khan customized his instructional approach based on the specific artistic temperament and psychological disposition of each disciple to foster individual stylistic expression. For instance, he intentionally structured Nikhil Banerjee’s training to ensure there would be no stylistic similarity to that of Ravi Shankar, despite the common foundational repertoire.

Nikhil Banarjee recounted how everyone had their fingers lacerated and sewn up from such intense training. Even if a student was sick or tired Khan would not hear any excuse.

Khan's instructional technique primarily relied on singing compositions that the students were required to replicate instantly on their respective instruments. Khan expected rapid comprehension and maintained zero tolerance for errors or lapses in concentration. He strictly dictated the musical progression of his students, explicitly forbidding the performance of advanced forms like the alap during the initial decades of training, directing them instead to master technical scales, rhythmic patterns, and foundational compositions until their focus and technical execution had matured. Khan applied these exacting standards universally. On one occasion during a lessons session, he famously threw a tabla tuning hammer at his patron, Maharaja Brijnath Singh, following a performance mistake.

He would not allow his own son, Ali Akbar Khan, to speak to anyone, even his mother, and insisted he focus on music alone.

=== Disciples ===
Khan trained numerous disciples under the Maihar-Senia gharana, many of whom became prominent exponents of Hindustani classical music across various vocal and instrumental disciplines. Notable students include:

- Ali Akbar Khan (son)
- Annapurna Devi (daughter)
- Ravi Shankar
- Nikhil Banerjee
- Pannalal Ghosh
- Bahadur Khan
- Sharan Rani
- V. G. Jog
- Vasant Rai
- Timirbaran
- Shripad Bandopdhyay
- Rabin Ghosh
- Nalin Mazumdar
- Jotin Bhattacharya
- Rajesh Chandra Moitra
- W. D. Amaradeva
- David Podiappuhami

== Music ==
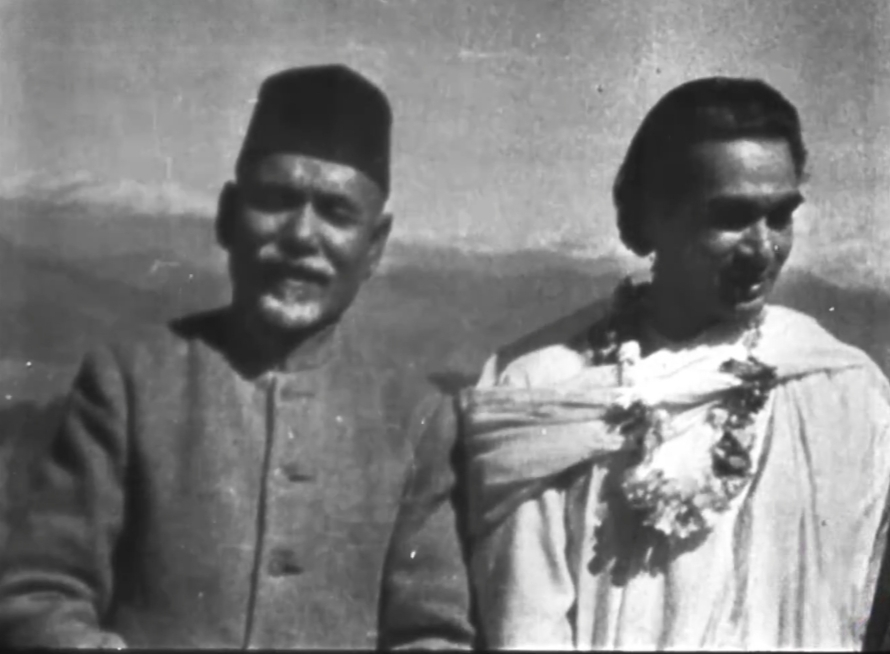
Allauddin Khan with Uday Shankar

Khan expanded the technical and expressive range of the sitar and sarod by integrating the playing styles, phrasing, and ornamentation of the veena, rabab, sursringar, and surbahar. Prior to these innovations, performances focused heavily on right-hand rhythmic patterns (diri diri strokes) with limited use of sustained glides (meend) or linear melodic passages (sapat tans). Khan also introduced a thick kharaj (bass) string to the sitar to achieve bass Sa.

He modified the sarod from its original setup of five main strings, two chikari (drone) strings, and nine sympathetic strings (tarab) to an arrangement featuring fifteen tarab strings, two chikari, four lower strings, and five upper strings. He made all five baz (melody) strings fully operative for plucking and sliding, whereas previous versions only utilized four. He tuned the first lower string to mandra sa. To support bass-dominant rāgas, he added a deep brass string as the first upper string, tuned to either ati mandra pancham or ati mandra madhyam depending on the scale. The remaining four upper strings were added as unstopped jivari strings tuned to Sa-Ga-Ri-Ni to increase resonance, which are plucked alongside the chikari during alap, jod, and jhala sections..

Ustad Allauddin Khan created and introduced several new ragas to the Hindustani classical tradition: Hemant, Hem-Bihag, Haimanti, Madan-Manjari (named after his wife), Manj-Khamaj, Muhammad etc.

In 1935, he toured Europe, along with Uday Shankar's ballet troupe.

=== Maihar Band ===
The foundation of the ensemble is traditionally attributed to the 1918 flu pandemic in India, which left many orphans. Allauddin khan inducted these orphaned children into a musical group to provide them solace and a livelihood. This initiative fructified in 1918 as the Maihar Band. The proposal received immediate patronage from Raja Braj Nath Singh, the ruling prince of Maihar State.

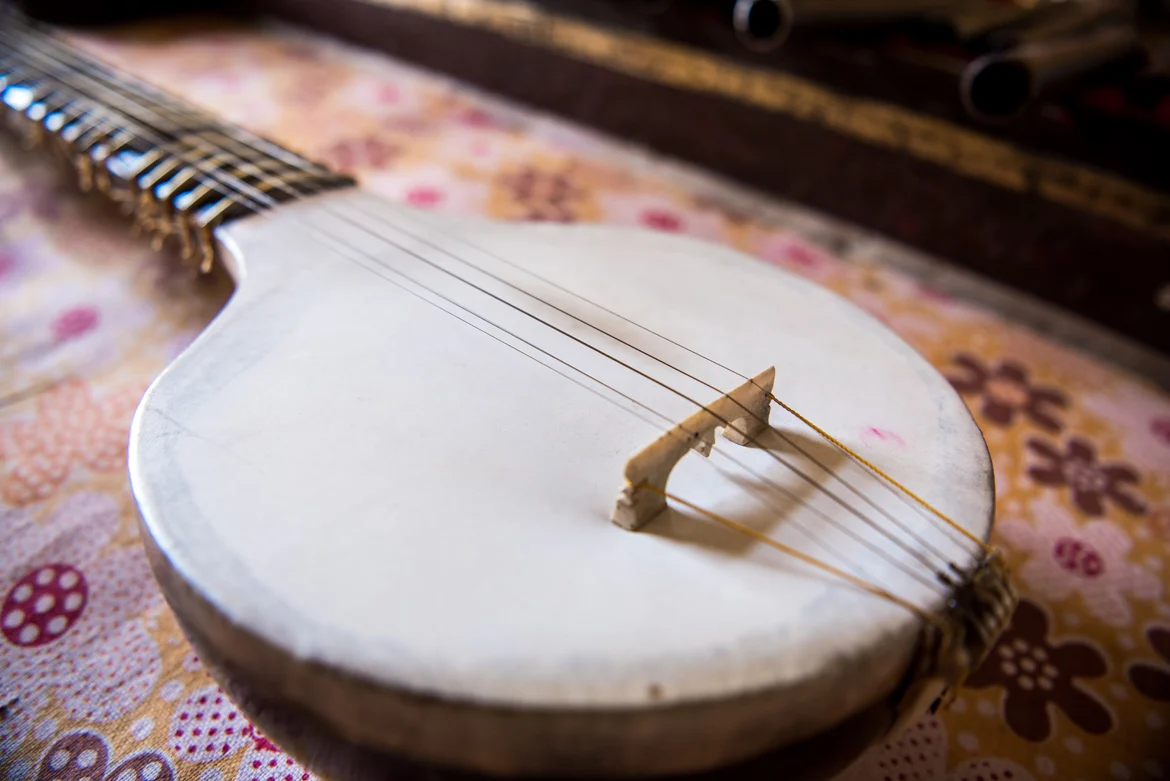
Sitar-Banjo

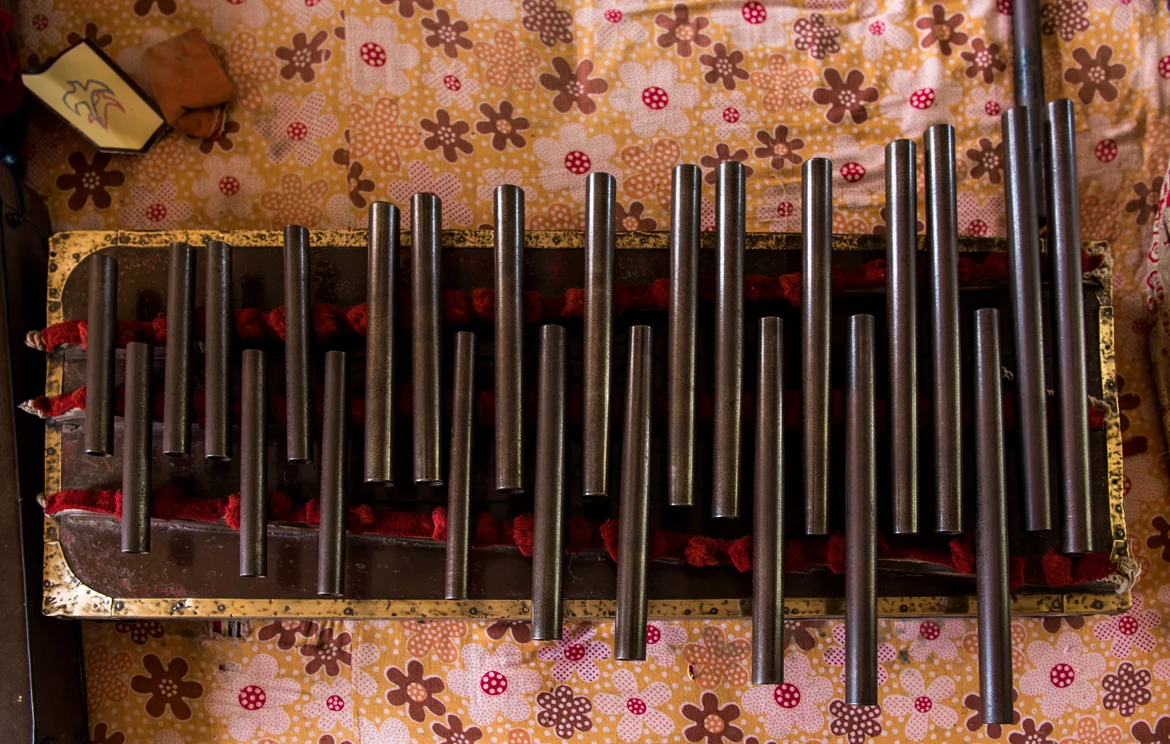
Nala Taranga

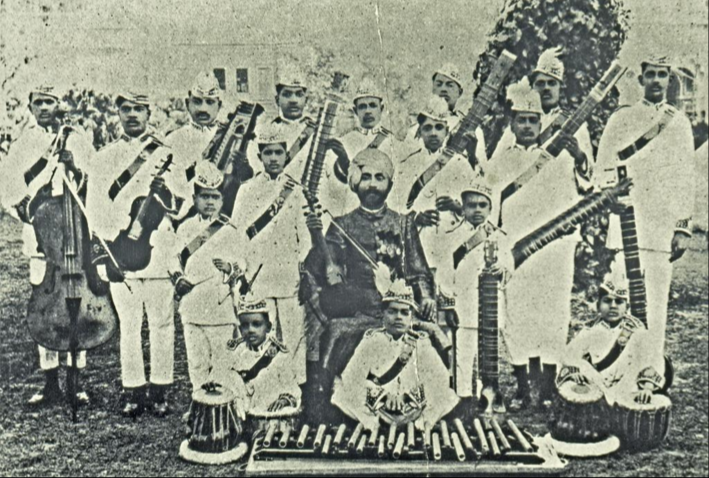
Maihar Band with Allauddin Khan in center

He created instruments like Nal Tarang, a percussion-melodic instrument crafted from repurposed gun barrels, Saranga-a larger variant of Sarangi with cello-like sound, Chandra Saranga with leather mounted base of Sarod, fretless but with resonance strings, played using a bow, and Sitar-Banjo, which were incorporated in the Maihar band.

== Personal life ==
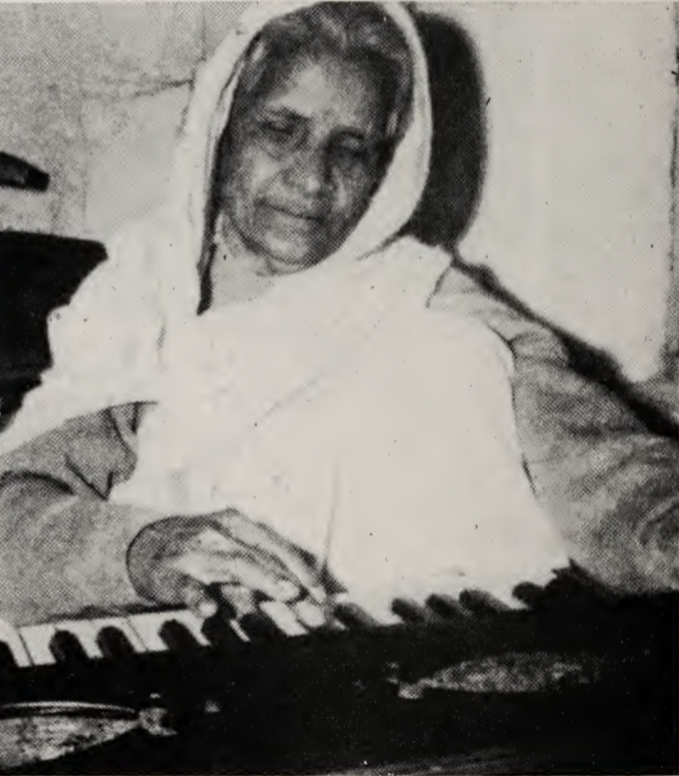
Madan Manjari Devi (1888 - 12 Nov 1989) playing Harmonium

Khan married Madanmanjari Devi with whom he had one son, Ali Akbar Khan, and three daughters: Sharija, Jehanara, and Annapurna Devi (born Roshanara Khan).

Madina Bhavan named after his wife, also known as Shanti Kutir, served as the gurukul and hub for Maihar Gharana, where he lived from 1918 until his death. In Mailhar house, the walls of Khan's personal chamber were covered with portraits of saints, poets, musicians including Beethoven, composers, and writers, alongside his certificates, doctorates, and portraits of Gods. In contrast, his wife's chamber featured largely bare walls, except for the wall facing her bed, which displays photographs of her immediate family alongside event and performance posters.

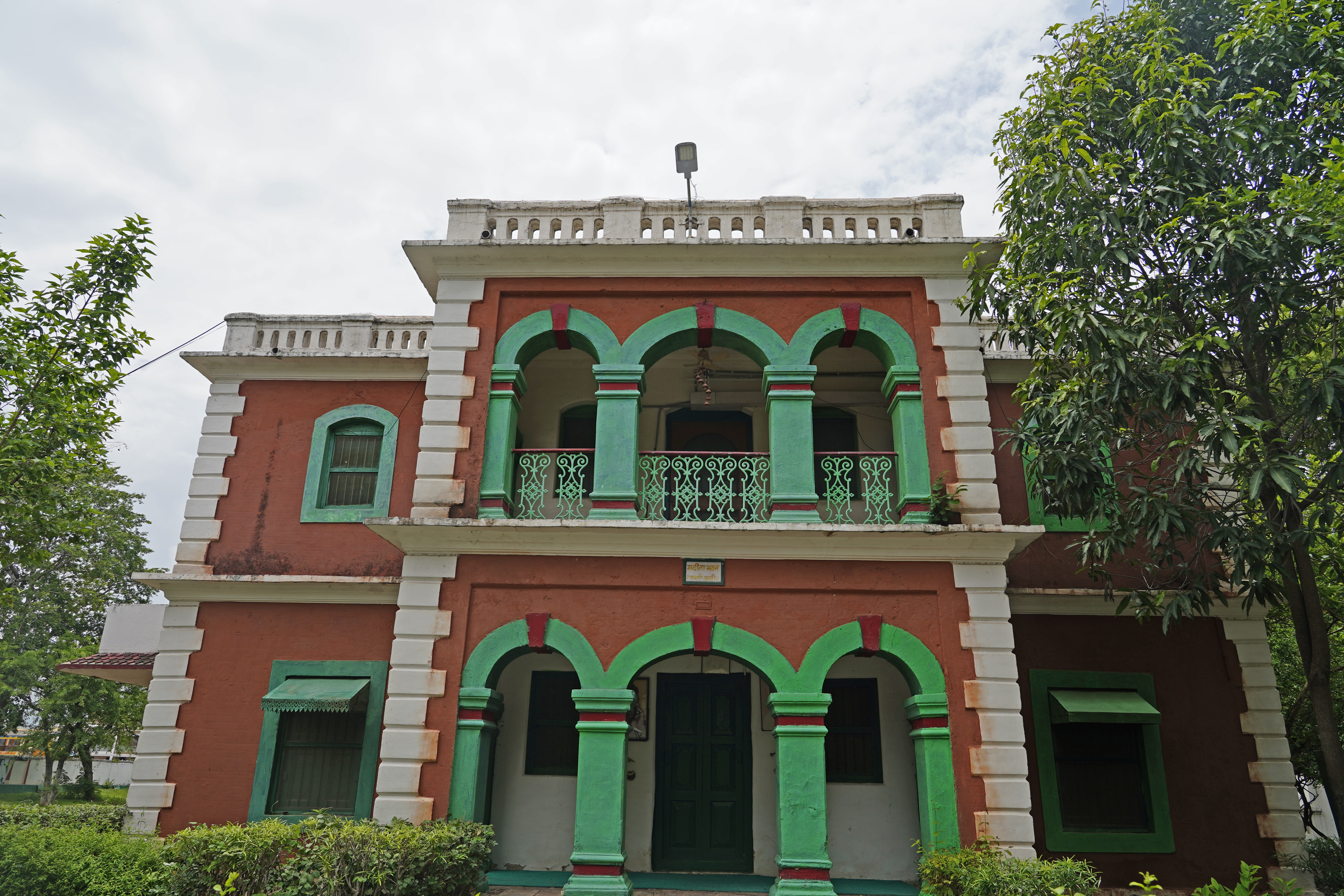
Khan's residence in Maihar, Madhya Pradesh, now preserved as his memorial.

=== Personality ===
Allauddin Khan lived a disciplined, and unassuming lifestyle with minimum necessities , completely eschewing personal luxuries. Committed to simple living, he performed his own daily chores, such as washing his own clothes and fetching market supplies, to ensure his students could focus entirely on their musical practice without distraction.

He was seen as being completely devoted to music who was not interested in talking or listening about worldly affairs.

The strictness he showed on students he himself observed: as a student he would tie his hair to ceiling to stop falling asleep and would practise most of day with little sleep. Though he was very strict and intense in musical affairs, frequently scolding and physically penalizing students, he was known to be very sensitive and pure soul. He routinely cared for wandering sadhus, established bird shelters around his home, and demonstrated compassion for the less fortunate, once using his own musical celebrity in a public market to help a struggling folk drum seller sell his wares. He was widely regarded as a saintly figure and was affectionately addressed as Baba.

=== Religion ===
In terms of religion, he was considered to be broad-minded. Ustad Allauddin Khan was deeply devoted to the Maa Sharda Devi temple atop the Trikuta Hills in Maihar. When he used to have his daily prayer or Namaz, he would tell Nikhil Banarjee to go to his room and have his Gayatri Japa. Nikhil Banatjee recollected how, often, Khan would be uttering Namaz and crying out Ma, Ma to Goddess Saraswati.

=== Death ===
Allauddin Khan died on September 6, 1972. People saw that the burial procession was being attended by the Hindus and Muslims alike and even the chief priest of the temple of Maa Sharda Mandir joined. A tomb was constructed by 1994 in his residence premises as tribute to both Allauddin Khan and his wife, with homage written on the outside by his son Ali Akbar Khan.

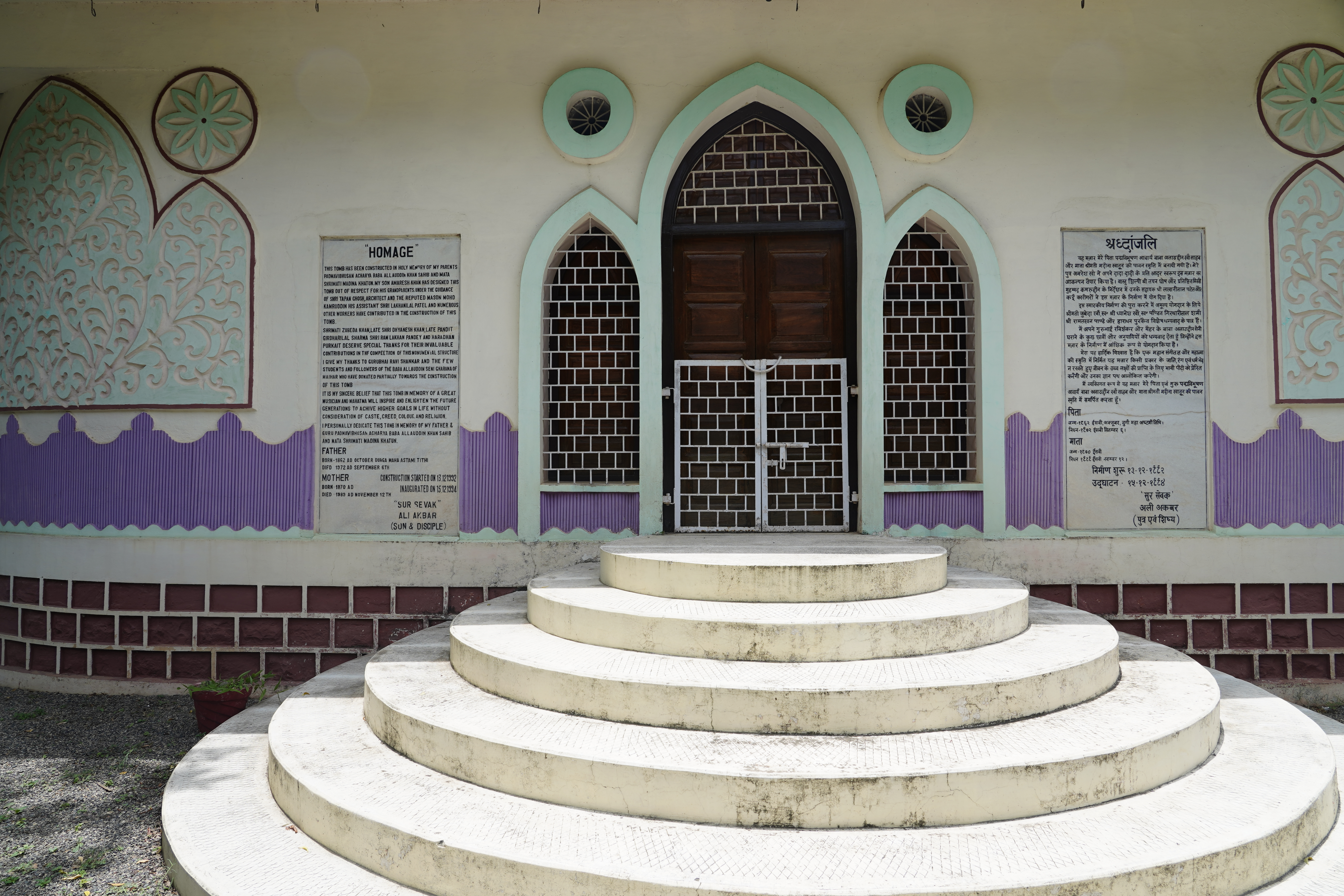
Tomb of Ustad Allauddin Khan and his wife

== Awards ==
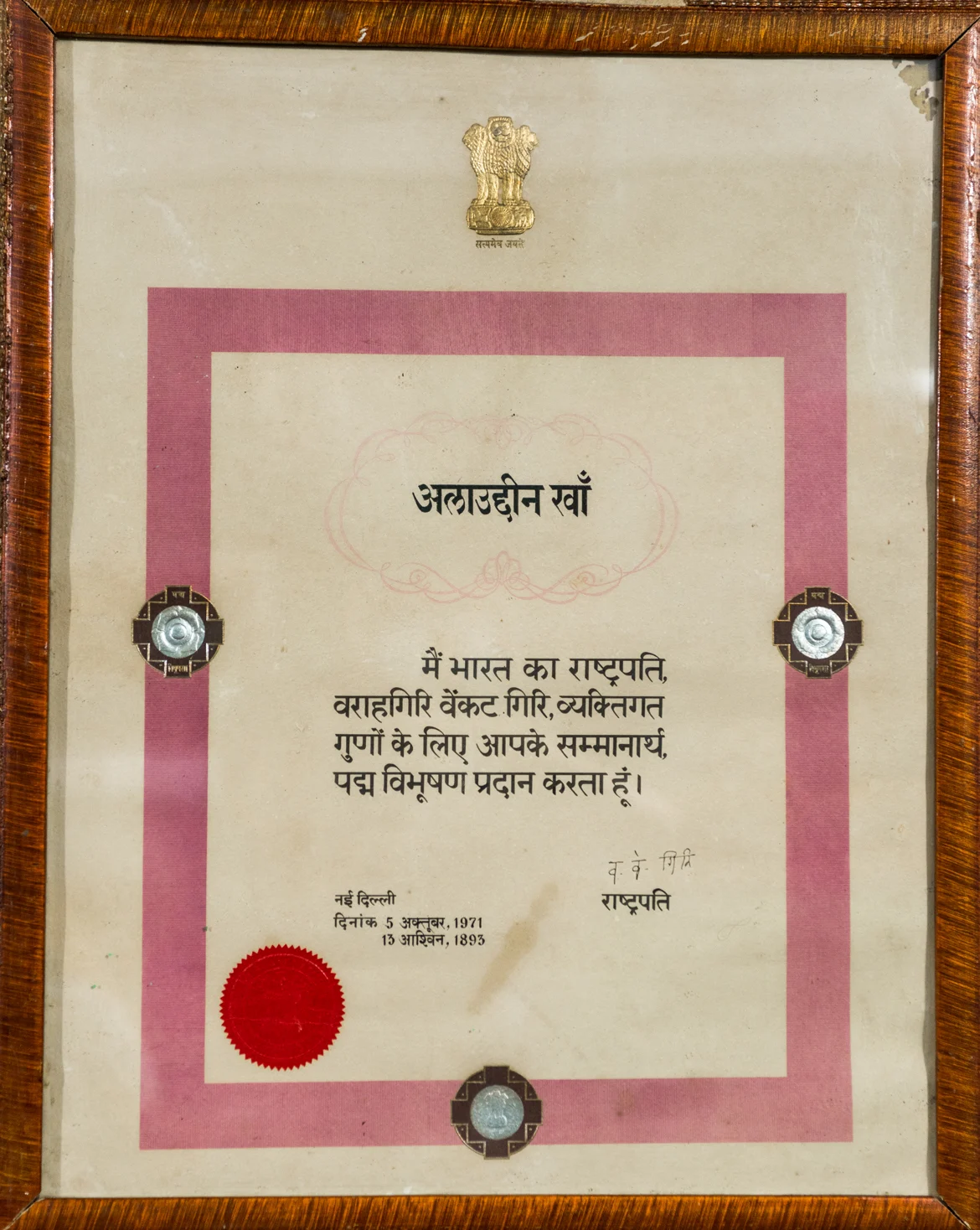
Padma Vibhushan awarded to Allauddin Khan

- 1944 – Conferred the title of Vadya Acharya by Bhatkhande University of Music, Lucknow.
- 1948 – Attended India's first music conference following Independence.
- 1952 – Honoured with Sangeet Natak Akademi Award, then known as Presidential Awards, for Sarod.
- 1954 – Elected Fellow of the Sangeet Natak Akademi (Sangeet Natak Akademi Fellowship).
- 1958 – Awarded the Padma Bhushan.
- 1961 – Honored with the Sangeet Acharya award by Indira Kala Sangeet Vishwavidyalaya, Khairagarh.
- 1963 – Conferred an honorary Doctorate of Literature (D.Litt.) by Rabindra Bharati University, Calcutta.
- 1964 – Awarded Desikottama (D.Litt.) (honorary doctorate) by Visva-Bharati University, Shantiniketan.
- 1971 – Awarded the Padma Vibhushan, as the first Hindustani classical musician to receive it.

== Films ==
- Ustad Alauddin Khan (1963), a documentary directed by Ritwik Ghatak.
- Baba Alauddin Khan (1965), a documentary by Indian film director Harisadhan Dasgupta.
- Raga (1971), directed by Howard Worth. Remastered version released in 2010 by East Meets West Music.
- Maihar Raag (1993), directed by Sunil Shanbag. A look at Allauddin Khan's crumbling heritage in Maihar, which won the National Film Award for Best Non-Feature Film in 1994.
