= Nasirnagar Upazila =

Nasirnagar নাসিরনগর
- Upazila
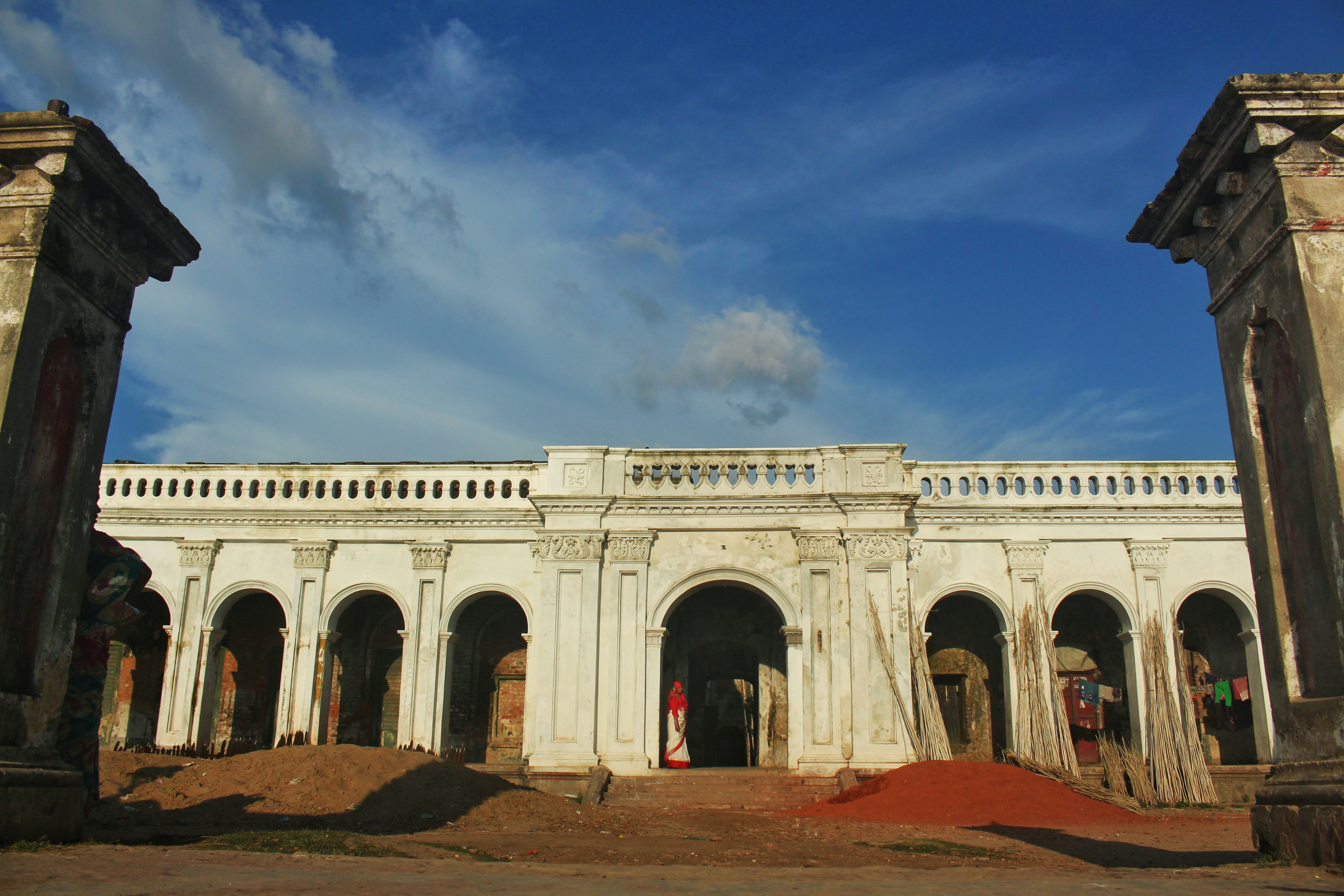
- Haripur Zamindar Bari

- Coordinates: 24°12.4′N 91°12.6′E
- Country: Bangladesh
- Division: Chittagong
- District: Brahmanbaria

Area
  - Total: 311.66 km^{2} (120.33 sq mi)

Population (2022)
  - Total: 346,774
  - Density: 1,112.7/km^{2} (2,881.8/sq mi)
- Time zone: UTC+7 (BST)
- Postal code: 3430
- Area code: 08526
- Website: Official Map of Nasirnagar

Nasirnagar Upazila mauza geocode map

Nasirnagar (Bengali: নাসিরনগর) is an upazila of Brahmanbaria District in Chittagong Division, Bangladesh.

== Geography ==
Nasirnagar is located at 24.2070°N 91.2097°E. It has a total area of 311.66 km^{2}.

== History ==
Nasirnagar, a haor-dominated upazila in Brahmanbaria district, came under the control of the British East India Company in 1765 during the acquisition of the Dewani. In 1830, the parganas of Sarail, Daudpur, Haripur, Bejura, and Satrakandal were transferred from Mymensingh to Tripura district. In 1860, Nasirnagar was established as a sub-district under the then Tripura district (formed in 1790 and renamed Comilla on October 1, 1960). In 1875, Nasirnagar sub-district was renamed Brahmanbaria sub-district. In 1792, the East India Company ordered the division of the district into thanas, with each thana covering an area of 400 square miles. In 1885, the then Tripura district was divided into eleven thanas, with fifteen police outposts. The number of police outposts was later reduced to two: Nasirnagar and Morichakandi. For the convenience of criminal administration, Nasirnagar police outpost was declared a thana in 1910. On August 1, 1983, Nasirnagar thana was upgraded to an upazila.

=== Liberation War ===
On November 15, 1971, Pakistani forces attacked various villages in Kunda, Bholakut, Gokarna, and Nasirnagar Sadar Union, setting houses on fire and killing many innocent people. The Mukti Bahini engaged in direct combat with Pakistani forces near Tullapara and Nasirnagar thana. A freedom fighter named Siddiqur Rahman from Chanderpara village in this upazila was martyred while fighting in Fulbaria village of the neighboring Kalauk upazila (now Lakhai). Nasirnagar was liberated from Pakistani forces on December 7, 1971.

=== Historical structures ===
In 1917, Kailashchandra Sarkar established the Jagannath Dev Temple in Nasirnagar upazila. Additionally, there is a Hindu temple in Fandauk village built during the Mughal era, showcasing distinct Mughal architectural features. Another notable structure is the Haripur Zamindar House (Big House). It is said that about 175 years ago, zamindars Gauri Prasad Ray Chowdhury and Krishna Prasad Ray Chowdhury constructed this house. Built on approximately 480 decimals of land, the house contains 50–55 rooms.

=== Natural disasters ===
The cyclone of 1971 completely devastated the villages of Chapairtala and Chitna. The region also suffered significant damage due to floods in 1974 and 1988.

== Demographics ==
Religions in Nasirnagar Upazila (2022)
Religion	Percent
Islam	84.86%
Hinduism	15.13%
Other or not stated	0.01%

According to the 2022 Bangladeshi census, Nasirnagar Upazila had 71,423 households and a population of 346,774. 13.40% of the population were under 5 years of age. Nasirnagar had a literacy rate (age 7 and over) of 61.97%: 61.37% for males and 62.47% for females, and a sex ratio of 86.76 males for every 100 females. 27,428 (7.91%) lived in urban areas.

According to the 2011 Census of Bangladesh, Nasirnagar Upazila had 59,024 households and a population of 309,011. 99,239 (32.12%) were under 10 years of age. Nasirnagar had a literacy rate (age 7 and over) of 34.92%, compared to the national average of 51.8%, and a sex ratio of 1052 females per 1000 males. 14,928 (4.83%) lived in urban areas.

According to the 1991 Bangladesh census, Nasirnagar had a population of 234,090. Males constituted 50.45% of the population, and females 49.55%. The population aged 18 or over was 114,601. Nasirnagar had an average literacy rate of 19.3% (7+ years), against the national average of 32.4%.

== Administration ==
Nasirnagar Upazila is divided into 13 union parishads: Burishwar, Bhalakut, Chapartala, Chatalpar, Dharmondol, Fandauk, Goalnagar, Gokarna, Goniauk, Haripur, Kunda, Nasirnagar, and Purbabhag. The union parishads are subdivided into 96 mauzas and 128 villages.

Chairman: Roma Akter

Vice Chairman: Abu Ahmad Kamrul Huda

Woman Vice Chairman: Rita Akhtar

Upazila Nirbahi Officer (UNO): Muhammad Imranul Haque

== Notable people ==
- Ashraf Ali Dharnondoli, Islamist politician, was born in Dharmandal in 1920.

== See also ==
- Upazilas of Bangladesh
- Districts of Bangladesh
- Divisions of Bangladesh
- Thanas of Bangladesh
- Union councils of Bangladesh
- Administrative geography of Bangladesh
- Villages of Bangladesh
