= Ayet Ali Khan =

Musician from Pakistan and Bangladesh (1884-1967)

Ayet Ali Khan আয়েত আলী খাঁ
- Born: 1884; Shibpur, Bengal Presidency, British India
- Origin: Maihar
- Died: 1967 (aged 82–83)
- Genres: Hindustani classical music
- Occupations: Composer, Sarodiya
- Instrument: Sarod
- Spouse: Umarunnesa
- Children: Bahadur Khan; Mobarak Hossain Khan; Abed Hossain Khan; Sheikh Sadi Khan
- Father: Sabdar Hossain Khan
- Relatives: Fakir Aftabuddin Khan (brother); Ustad Alauddin Khan (brother)
- Awards: Pride of Performance award by the President of Pakistan in 1966

Ayet Ali Khan (1884 – 1967) was a Bengali classical musician and developer of musical instruments.

== Early life ==
Khan was born in Shibpur, Brahmanbaria, Bengal Presidency, British India in 1884. He trained under his brothers Fakir Aftabuddin Khan and Ustad Alauddin Khan. He trained in Rampur under Ustad Wazir Khan for 30 years.

== Career ==
Khan took residence in the Maihir State as court musician. He formed an indigenous instrumental orchestra with his brother. In 1935, he joined Santiniketan as the head of the Music department after Rabindranath Tagore invited him. He left the post over health reasons. He invented two musical instruments, Manohara and Mandrand and developed the surbahar and the sarod. He invented a number of Ragas including Aol-Basanta, Omar-Sohag, Varis, and Hemantika. He established the Alauddin Music College in 1948 in Comilla and in 1954 in Brahmanbaria. From 1961 to 1965 he worked at Radio Pakistan.

== Awards ==
- Tamgha-e-Imtiaz (Medal of Excellence) award by the Government of Pakistan (1961)
- Pride of Performance Award by the President of Pakistan (1966)
- Bangladesh Shilpakala Academy Award (1976)
- Independence Award (1984)

== Personal life and death ==
Khan was married to Umarunnesa. Their children were Bahadur Khan, Mobarak Hossain Khan, Abed Hossain Khan, Sheikh Sadi Khan, Ambia, Kohinoor and Razia.

Khan died in 1967.
