= Ashraful =

Ashraful may refer to:

- Ashraful Abedin, Jatiya Party (Ershad) politician and the former Member of Parliament
- Mohammad Ashraful (born 1984), Bangladeshi cricketer
- Ashraful Hoq Chowdhury, rear admiral of the Bangladesh Navy, director general of the Bangladesh Coast Guard
- M Ashraful Haq, retired admiral of Bangladesh Navy, Assistant Chief of Naval Staff
- Ashraful Haque (cricketer), former Bangladeshi cricketer
- Ashraful Haque (actor) (died 2015), Indian actor who mainly appeared in Hindi films
- Ashraful Hossain (born 1989), Bangladeshi cricketer
- Ashraful Huda, former Bangladesh police officer, Inspector General of Police of Bangladesh Police
- Ashraful Hussain (born 1994), Indian politician, Member of Assam Legislative Assembly
- Ashraful Islam (army officer), major general in the Bangladesh Army, chairman of Bangladesh Tea Board
- Ashraful Islam (field hockey), international field hockey player in Bangladesh
- Ashraful Islam (politician), Bangladesh Awami League politician, former Member of Parliament
- Sayed Ashraful Islam (1952–2019), Bangladesh Awami League politician
- Ashraful Islam Rana (born 1988), Bangladeshi professional footballer

== See also ==
- Ashra (disambiguation)
