= Ashraful Islam =

Ashraful Islam may refer to:

- Ashraful Islam (general), Bangladeshi general
- Ashraful Islam (field hockey), Bangladeshi field hockey player
- Ashraful Islam (politician), Bangladeshi politician

== See also ==
- Ashraful Islam Rana (born 1988), Bangladeshi association football player
