= Mainamati =

Archaeological site in Bangladesh

Coordinates: 23.4261°N 91.1378°E

Moinamoti

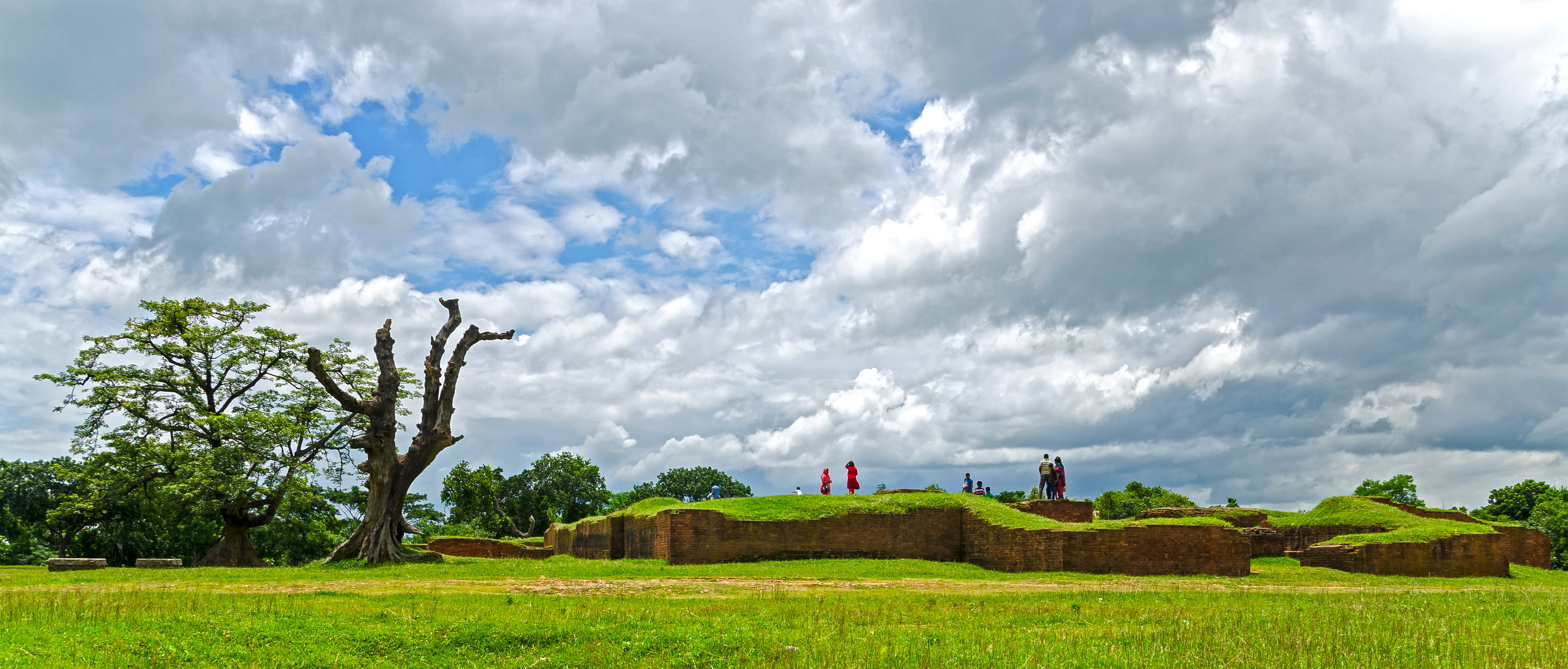
Palace of Queen Moinamoti

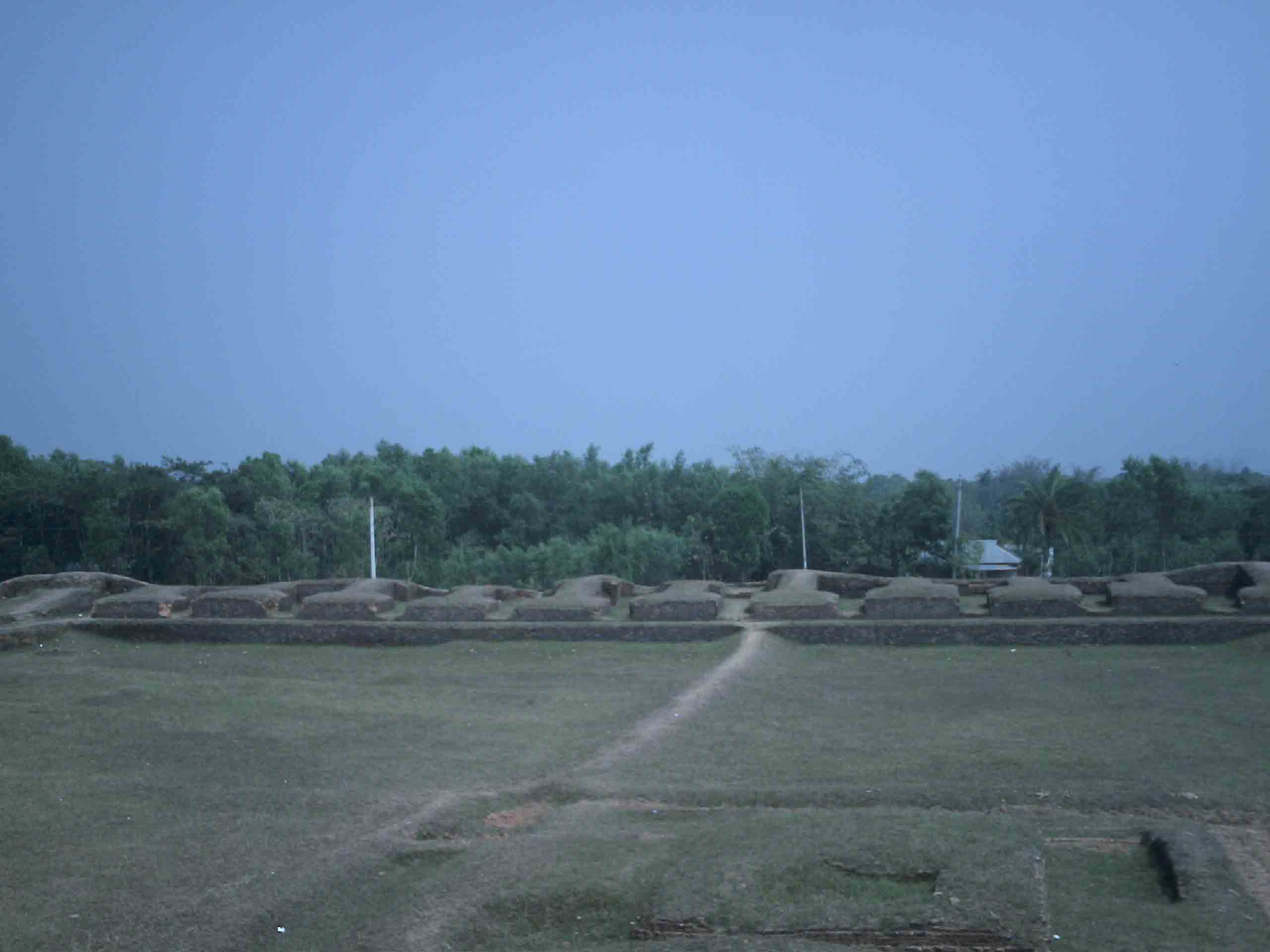
Shalban Bihar

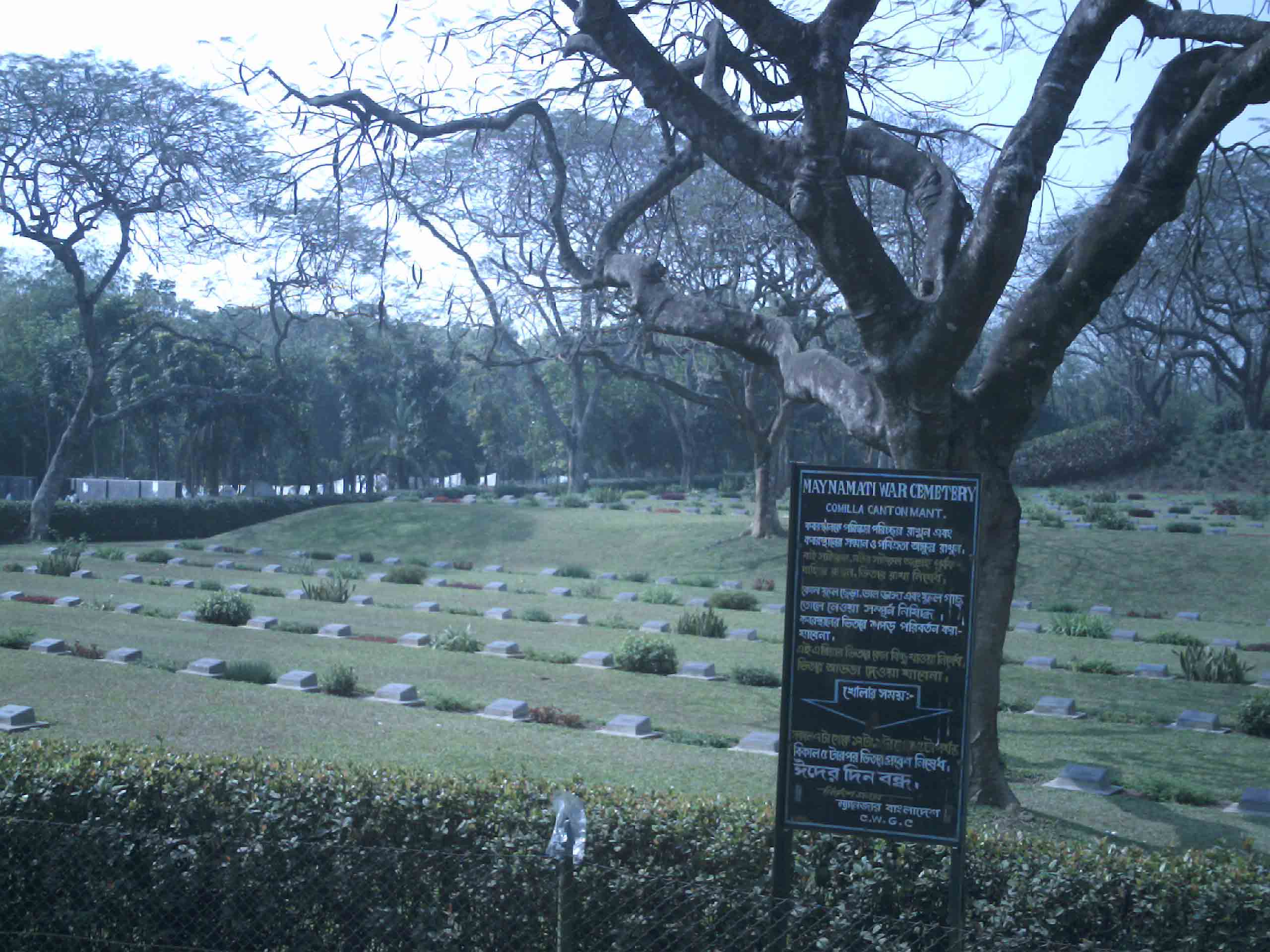
Mainamati War Cemetery

Moinamoti (Bengali: ময়নামতি, romanized: Môynamoti) is an isolated low, dimpled range of hills, dotted with more than 50 ancient Buddhist settlements dating between the 8th and 12th century, Starting from 1875. CE. It was part of the ancient Samatata division of Bengal. It extends through the centre of the district of Comilla in Bangladesh. Moinamoti is located some 12 km (8 miles) from the city of Comilla. It is the home of one of the most important Buddhist archaeological sites in the region. Comilla Cantonment is located nearby and houses a beautiful colonial era cemetery. Mainamati is named for the Chandra queen of the same name, mother of the king Govindachandra. According historian Bisweswar Chakravarti the dynasty had relation with Mahishya king Harish Pala. According to the folk song of Comilla, 'Mainamatir Gan' mentioned that Raja Govindachandra married Raja Harish Pala's two daughters named 'Aduna' and 'Poduna'. Mainamati is 114 kilometers (70 miles) from Dhaka city through National Highway 1 and nearly 162 kilometers (100 miles) from Chittagong. There is also a Buddhist temple located beside it.

== Buddhist Monuments ==
- Shalban Vihara: At the centre piece of the Buddhist sites at Mainamati is the Shalban vihara, almost in the middle of the Mainamati-Lalmai hill range consists of 115 cells, built around a spacious courtyard with a cruciform temple in the centre, facing its only gateway complex to the north, resembling that of the Sompur Bihara. It is clearly a Vihara, or an educational centre with residential facilities.
- Kutila Mura: Situated on a flattened hillock, about 5 km north of Shalban Vihara inside the Comilla Cantonment is a picturesque Buddhist establishment. Here, three stupas are found side by side representing the Buddhist "Trinity" or three jewels, i.e. the Buddha, Dharma and Sangha.
- Charpatra Mura: This is an isolated small oblong shrine situated about 2.5 km. north-west of Kotila Mura stupas. The only approach to the shrine is from the east through a gateway, which leads to a spacious hall. A number of shrines can be found here.
- Mainamati Ranir Bari: The Mainamati site Museum, situated next to Shavian Vihara, houses a good collection of artifacts found at these sites. The Museum has a rich and varied collection of copper plates, gold and silver coins and 86 bronze objects. Over 150 bronze statues have been recovered mostly from the monastic cells. Bronze stupas, stone sculptures and hundreds of terracotta plaques each measuring on an average of 9" inches high and 8" to 12" inches wide.
