= Kutila Mura =

Archaeological site in Mainamati, Cumilla, Bangladesh

- কুটিলা মুড়া
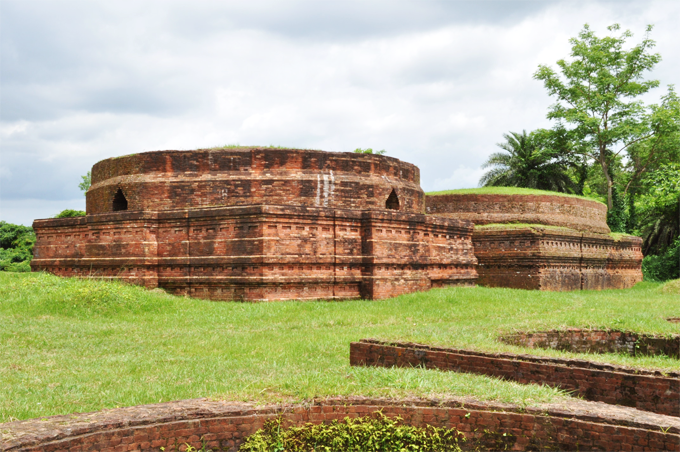
- Kutila Mura

- Location within Bangladesh Location within Southwest Asia
- 23°27′28.88″N 91°7′15.16″E
- Location: Mainamati, Cumilla District, Chittagong Division, Bangladesh

History
- Built: 7th century

The Kutila Mura (Bengali: কুটিলা মুড়া) is an archaeological site located in Mainamati, Comilla, Bangladesh. It is one of the most significant Buddhist sites in the region, renowned for its well-preserved stupas and historical importance.

== History ==
Kutila Mura is situated on the highest mound in the northeastern part of the Lalmai ridge, near the ancient site of Ananda Vihara. Excavations at the site suggest that the earliest structures date back to the 7th century, with the most recent constructions possibly dating to the 13th century. This is supported by the discovery of an Abbasid gold coin, found in the upper layers during excavation. Additionally, five ancient inscriptions found in the Mainamati area reference two Ratna-traya shrines in the nearby city of Devaparvata, and it is inferred that Kutila Mura may have been one of these shrines.

== Architecture ==
Kutila Mura is known for its unique architectural design, differing significantly from other nearby sites such as Shalvan Vihara. While sites like Shalvan Vihara showcase a more evolved architectural style, Kutila Mura maintains a traditional design.

The site features three main stupas, which are aligned in a north–south direction. These stupas are believed to symbolize the 'three jewels' of Buddhism (Tri-ratna): Buddha (knowledge), Dharma (morality), and Sanggha (discipline). The foundation of the central stupa is laid out in the shape of a Dharmachakra, with a deep central shaft surrounded by eight box chambers. These chambers housed numerous votive stupas made of terracotta and clay, as well as sealings and large pieces of fine Buddhist sculptures made from soft grey shale. The foundations of the other two stupas contained similar relics, though without the sculptures.

== Cultural Significance ==
Kutila Mura's alignment with the three jewels of Buddhism and its rich collection of religious relics point to its importance as a Buddhist sacred site. The site's religious symbolism and architectural complexity highlight the depth of Buddhist culture in the region during the period between the 7th and 13th centuries.

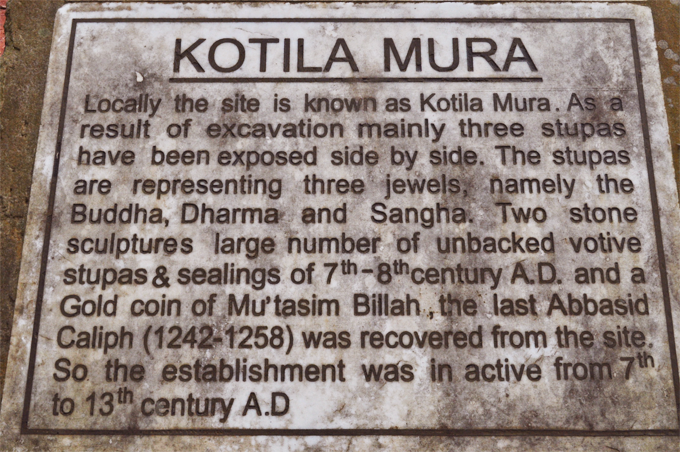
Information Plaque

== See also ==
- Somapura Mahavihara
- Bikrampur Vihara
- Kantajew Temple
- Mainamati
- Pandit Vihara
- Sixty Dome Mosque
- Lalbagh Fort
- List of archaeological sites in Bangladesh
