= Muhammad Enayet Ullah =

Major general in Bangladesh

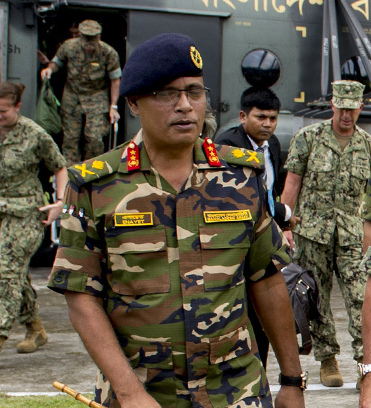
- Major General Enayet in 2017
- Born: January 7, 1965 (age 61); Kurigram, East Pakistan, Pakistan
- Military career
- Allegiance: Bangladesh
- Branch: Bangladesh Army
- Service years: 1985–2021
- Rank: Major General
- Unit: Regiment of Artillery
- Commands: AG of Army Headquarters; Commandant of BIPSOT; Commandant of DSCSC; GOC of 33rd Infantry Division; Chairman of Bangladesh Tea Board; Commander of 9th Artillery Brigade; Commander of 66th Artillery Brigade
- Conflicts: UNIKOM; UNMIT
- Awards: Bishishto Seba Padak (BSP)

Muhammad Enayet Ullah (Bengali: মুহম্মদ এনায়েত উল্লাহ) is a retired major general of the Bangladesh Army. He was adjutant general at the Bangladesh Army Headquarters.

== Early life and education ==
Enayet Ullah was born on 7 January 1965 in Kurigram District, East Pakistan, Pakistan. He graduated from Rangpur Cadet College. He also graduated from PLA National Defence University and Defence Services Command and Staff College. He has a Master's in Defence Studies from the National University, Bangladesh. He completed an MBA from Royal University of Dhaka.

== Career ==
Enayet Ullah was commissioned in the 12th Bangladesh Military Academy Long Course on 19 May 1985. He served as the brigade major of the 66th Artillery Brigade. He served as the general staff officer at the Army Training and Doctrine Command. He served in the United Nations Iraq–Kuwait Observation Mission and the United Nations Integrated Mission in East Timor. He served as the director in charge of the Administration and Logistics Directorate at the Armed Forces Division. He had served as the commandant of the Bangladesh Institute of Peace Support Operation Training.

Enayet Ullah commanded the 27th Field Artillery Regiment as lieutenant colonel and two artillery brigades as brigadier general. He was also the commandant of the Defence Services Command and Staff College. He was the chairman of the Bangladesh Tea Board, vice-chairman of the Trust Bank Limited, and vice-president of the Bangladesh Golf Federation and the Kurmitola Golf Club. On 20 February 2020, he was appointed the adjutant general at the Bangladesh Army Headquarters.
