= Rangpur Cadet College =

Military high school in Bangladesh

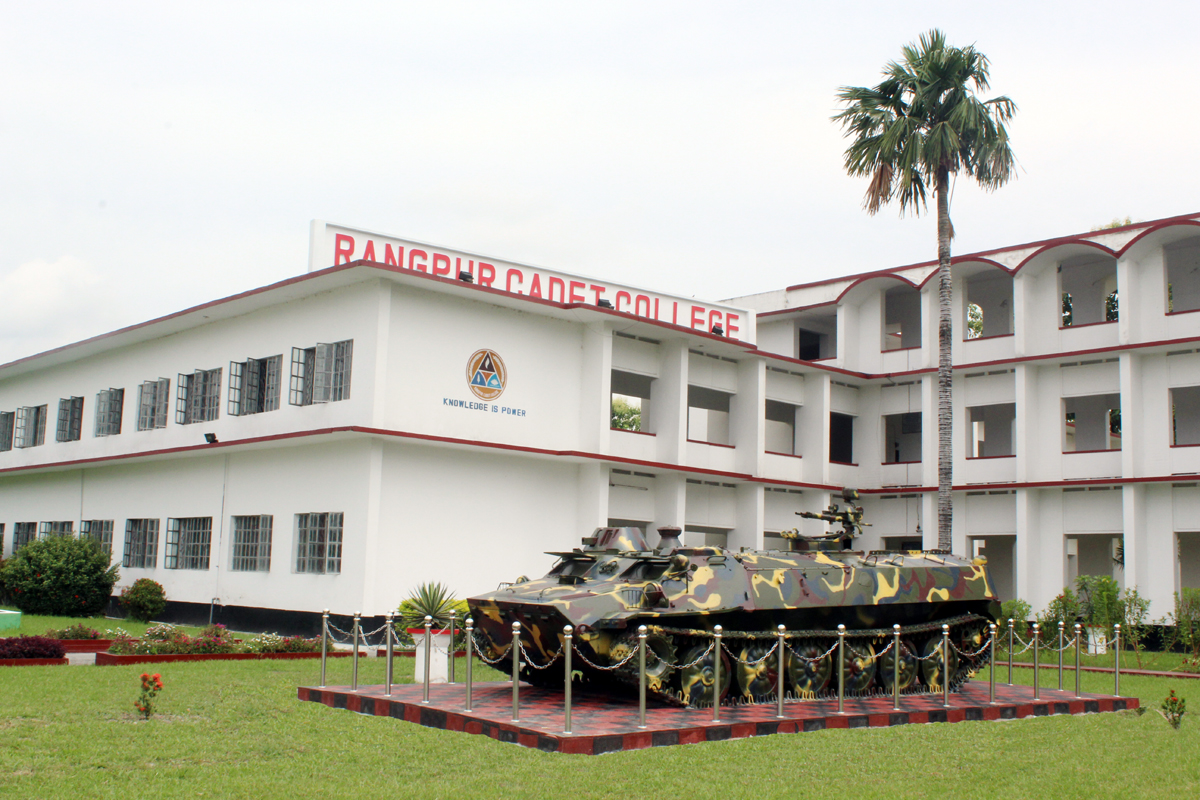
- Academic building of Rangpur Cadet College

Location
- Ashratpur, Rangpur Sadar Upazila; Rangpur, Bangladesh, 5404; 25.7126°N 89.2588°E

Information
- Established: 1 July 1979; 47 years ago
- School board: Board of Intermediate and Secondary Education, Dinajpur
- Principal: A H M SERAJUZZAMAN, PROFESSOR
- Adjutant: Major Md Tanvir Morshed Sagor, Inf
- Language: English
- EIIN: 127483
- Website: ccr.army.mil.bd

Rangpur Cadet College is a military college for boys in Rangpur, Bangladesh. The English-medium college was established in 1979.

== Alumni ==
- Major General Ashraful Islam
- Rear Admiral Golam Sadeq
- Major General Muhammad Enayet Ullah
- Add. IGP Kamrul Ahsan
