= Cumilla Cantonment =

Cantonment in Bangladesh

- কুমিল্লা সেনানিবাস
- Near Comilla in Bangladesh
- The No. 1 Gate, one of the main entrances to Cumilla Cantonment.

Site information
- Type: Cantonment
- Controlled by: Bangladesh Army

Location
- Coordinates: 23°28′3″N 91°7′3″E

Garrison information
- Current commander: Major General Mohamad Mohtashim Hyder Chowdhury, General Officer Commanding, 33rd Infantry Division & Area Commander, Cumilla Cantonment

Cumilla Cantonment (Bengali: কুমিল্লা সেনানিবাস) is a military station of the Bangladesh Army, located near Comilla, Bangladesh. The 33rd Infantry Division is based there.

Construction of the base during the Second World War damaged unsurveyed archaeological remains. Since then, archaeologists have excavated and protected some sites within the cantonment.

== History ==
During the Second World War, a jungle warfare school was set up at Comilla by the 14th Indian Infantry Division, after the mid-1942 Allied retreat from Burma. The school emphasized techniques in six areas key to successful fighting in jungle terrain: outflanking, being outflanked, ambushing and other minor tactics, the myth of the impenetrable jungle, health, and fitness. The school was transferred to Sevoke in 1943.

In 1943–1944, military contractors constructing what was then called Mainamati Cantonment disturbed and damaged unsurveyed archaeological remains at the site. The Archaeological Survey of India's T. N. Ramachandran conducted a hurried archaeological survey, the first of the area, in 1944-1945. As a result of his work, some sites were protected, but much irreversible damage had already been done.

Starting in 1955, the Pakistan Department of Archaeology excavated some sites within the cantonment. These included Kutila Mura, a Buddhist site probably built in the 7th century that comprises stupas, votive shrines, chaitya halls, and a monastery.

The third battalion of the East Bengal Regiment was raised at the cantonment on 4 February 1962.

Military priorities continued to be at odds with the preservation of ancient sites. In 1966, Barrie Morrison conducted archealogical fieldwork in the Lalmai Hills. He wrote that Abbas Ali Mura, the 6,750 square feet (627 m^{2}) site of a possible shrine, "was being bulldozed flat for new construction in the cantonment".

During the Indo-Pakistani War of 1971, an Indian news magazine described it as "one of the best natural fortifications" in East Bengal because "the greater part of this cantonment is tunnelled into the hill and is impervious to aerial bombing". Later, the base was renamed Comilla Cantonment.

The Bangladesh Military Academy (BMA) was established at the cantonment on 11 January 1974. It relocated to Bhatiari in 1976. The School of Military Intelligence, established in May 1978 at Dhaka Cantonment, was transferred to Comilla Cantonment in July 1981.

== Based units ==
The 33rd Infantry Division is a formation of the Bangladesh Army. The division is headquartered at Cumilla Cantonment and is responsible for military formations and units under the Cumilla Area.

The division includes several infantry brigades and supporting units. Its formation include the 101 Infantry Brigade and other subordinate units stationed in the Cumilla Area.

== Education ==
Cumilla Cantonment hosts several educational institutions including medical, higher-secondary and secondary-level institutions.

Army Medical College Cumilla is the cantonment's only medical college recognized by the Bangladesh Medical and Dental Council (BMDC). Instruction at the college began in 2015, and it is affiliated with Bangladesh University of Professionals (BUP).

At the higher-secondary level, Cantonment College is the private Cantonment College, established in 2003.

Cumilla Cadet College, originally established as a cadet college, began its academic activities in 1984.

Other educational institutions include Ispahani Cantonment Public School and College, founded in 1962, and Mainamati English School and College, established in 1997. Secondary-level institutions include Cantonment Board Girls' High School, Comilla (1989), Cantonment Board Madhyamic Bidyalaya (1997), and Comilla Cantonment High School (1956).

== See also ==
- Mainamati
- Mainamati War Cemetery
