= Mainamati War Cemetery =

Cemetery in Comilla, Bangladesh

- ময়নামতি যুদ্ধ সমাধি
- Commonwealth War Graves Commission
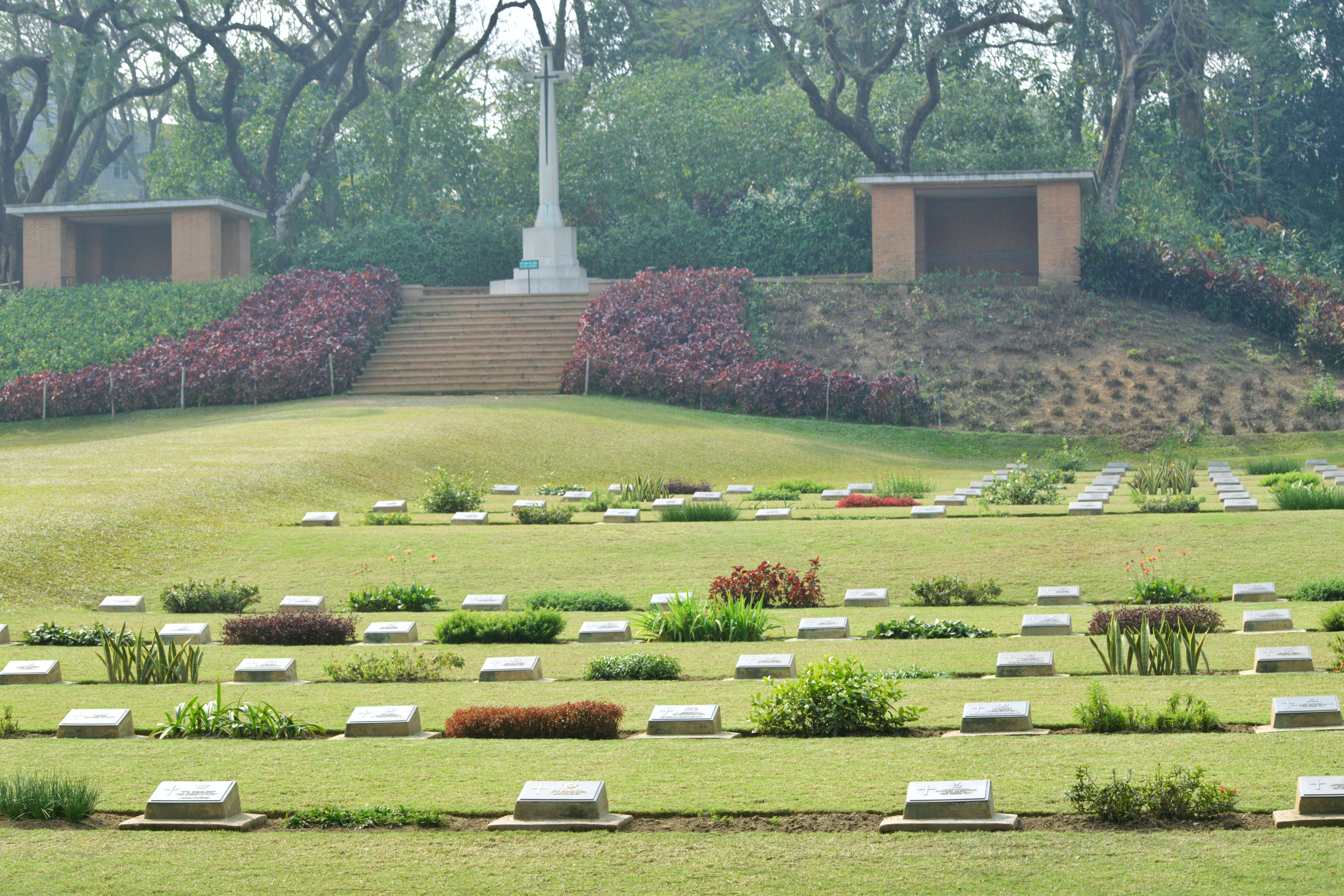
- Mainamati War Cemetery in Comilla
- Used for those deceased
- Established: After World War II (1939–1945)
- Location: 23.48703°N 91.11293°E near Comilla
- Total burials: 736

Burials by nation
- * United Kingdom – 357: Canada – 12; Australia – 12; New Zealand – 4; British Raj – 178; East Africa – 56; West Africa – 86; South Africa – 1; Burma – 1; Belgium – 1; Poland – 1; Japan – 24 (In 2024, the remains of the 24 dead bodies were taken to Japan.); Rhodesia – 3

Burials by war
- Second World War

The Mainamati War Cemetery (alternatively: Comilla War Cemetery) is a war cemetery and a memorial in Comilla, Bangladesh, for Second World War graves from nearby areas. The cemetery contains 736 Commonwealth burials. It was established and maintained by the Commonwealth War Graves Commission, to pay tribute to those who sacrificed their lives. It is situated in the Comilla Cantonment area.

== Gallery ==
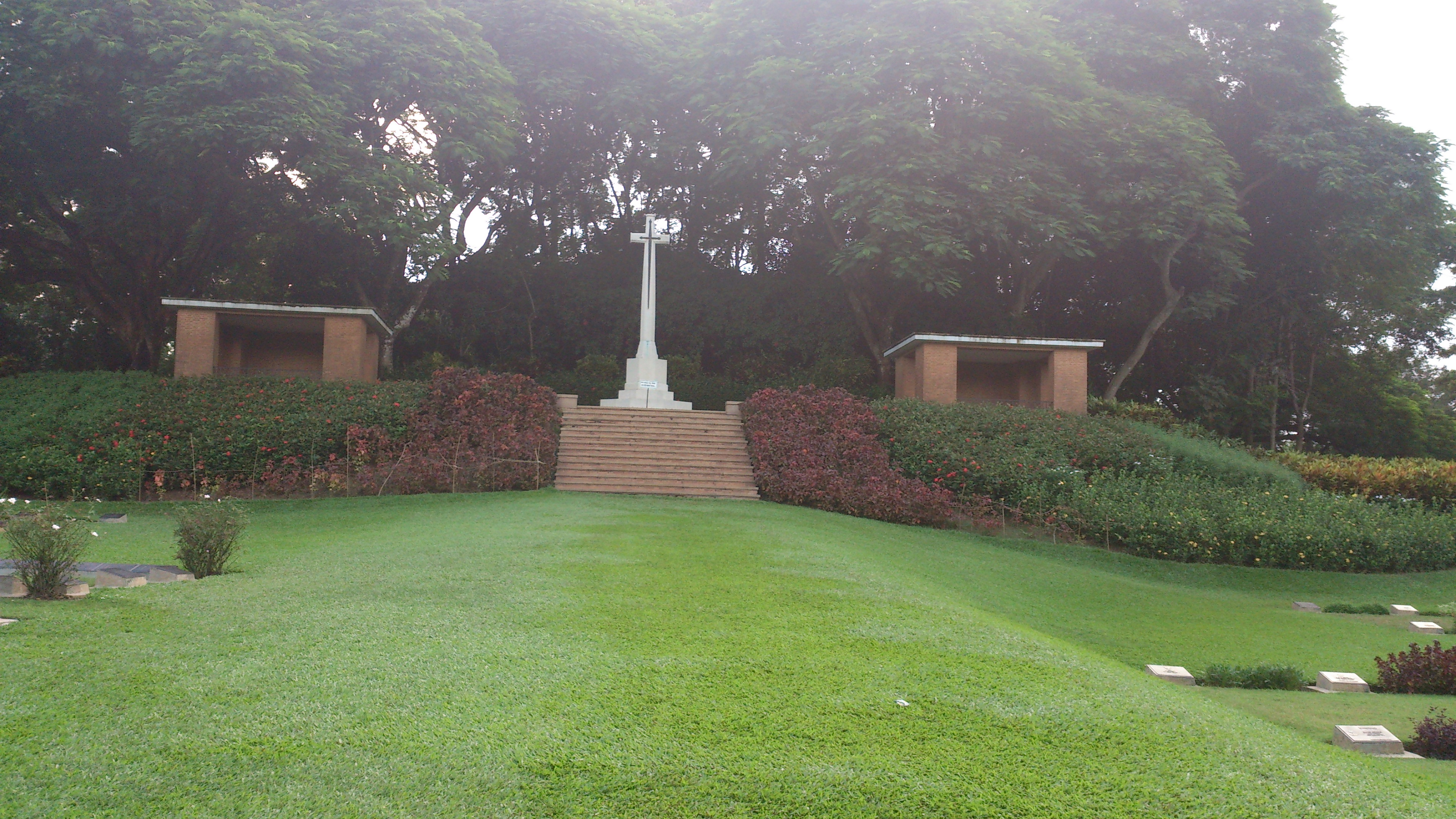

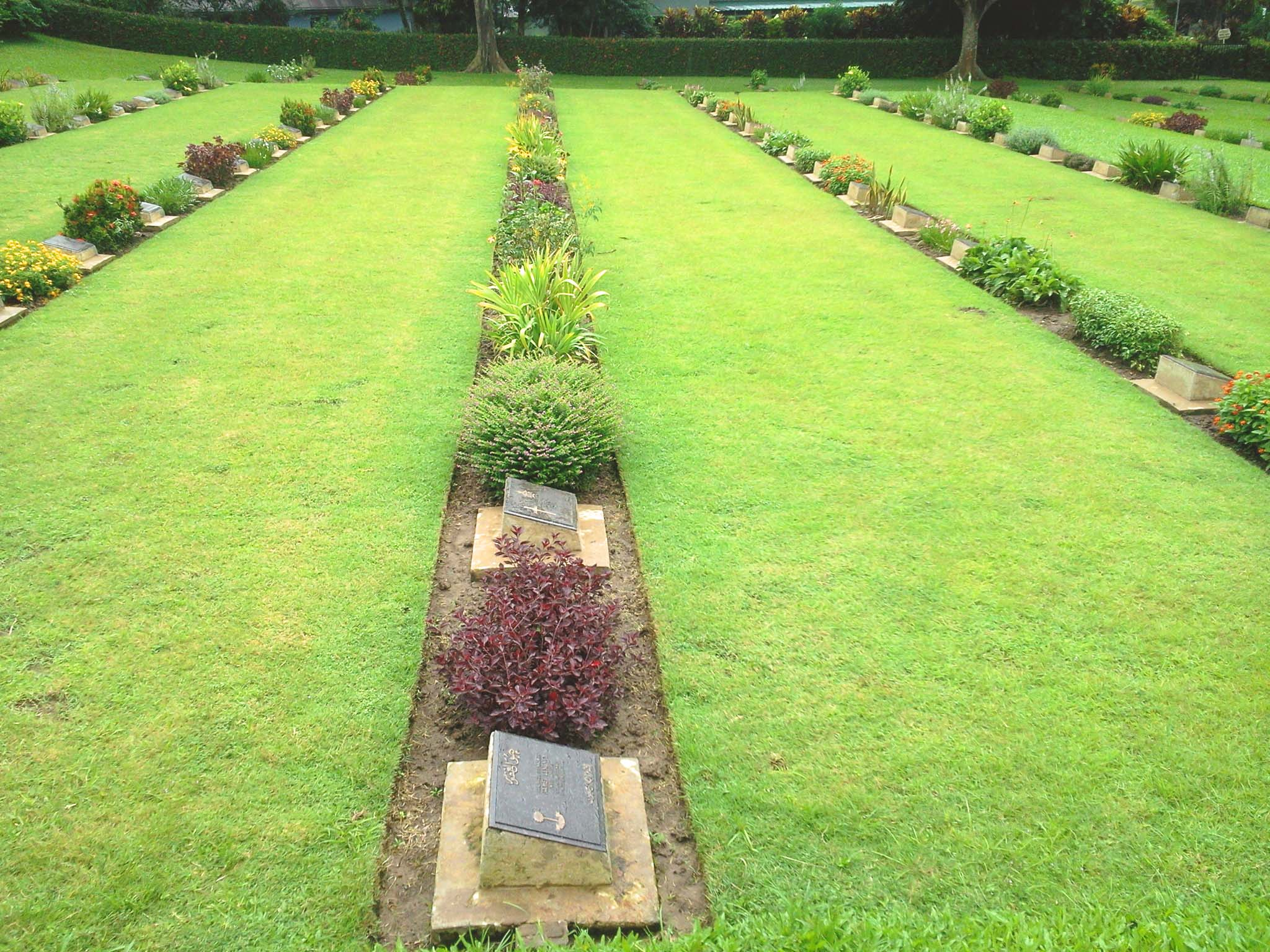

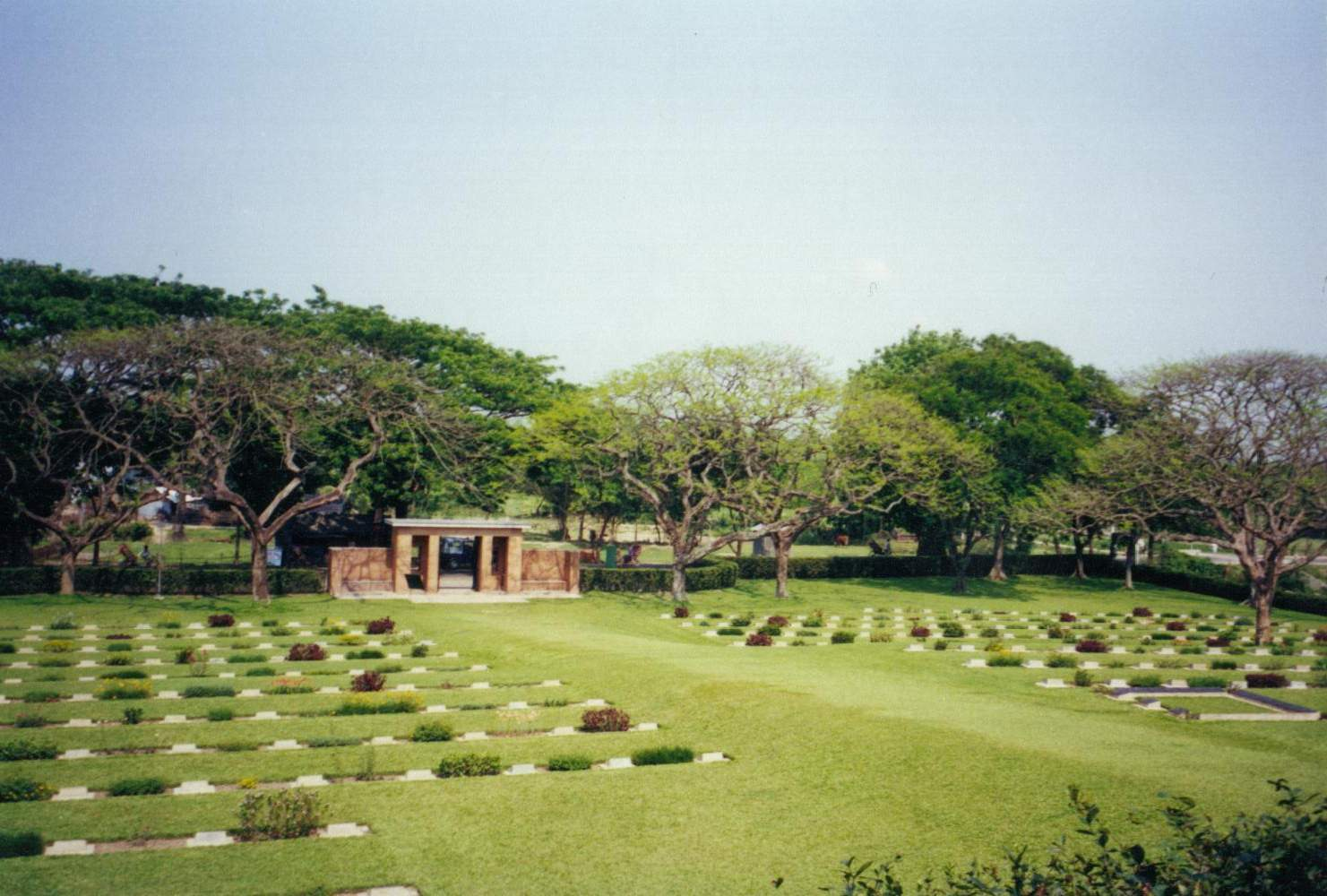

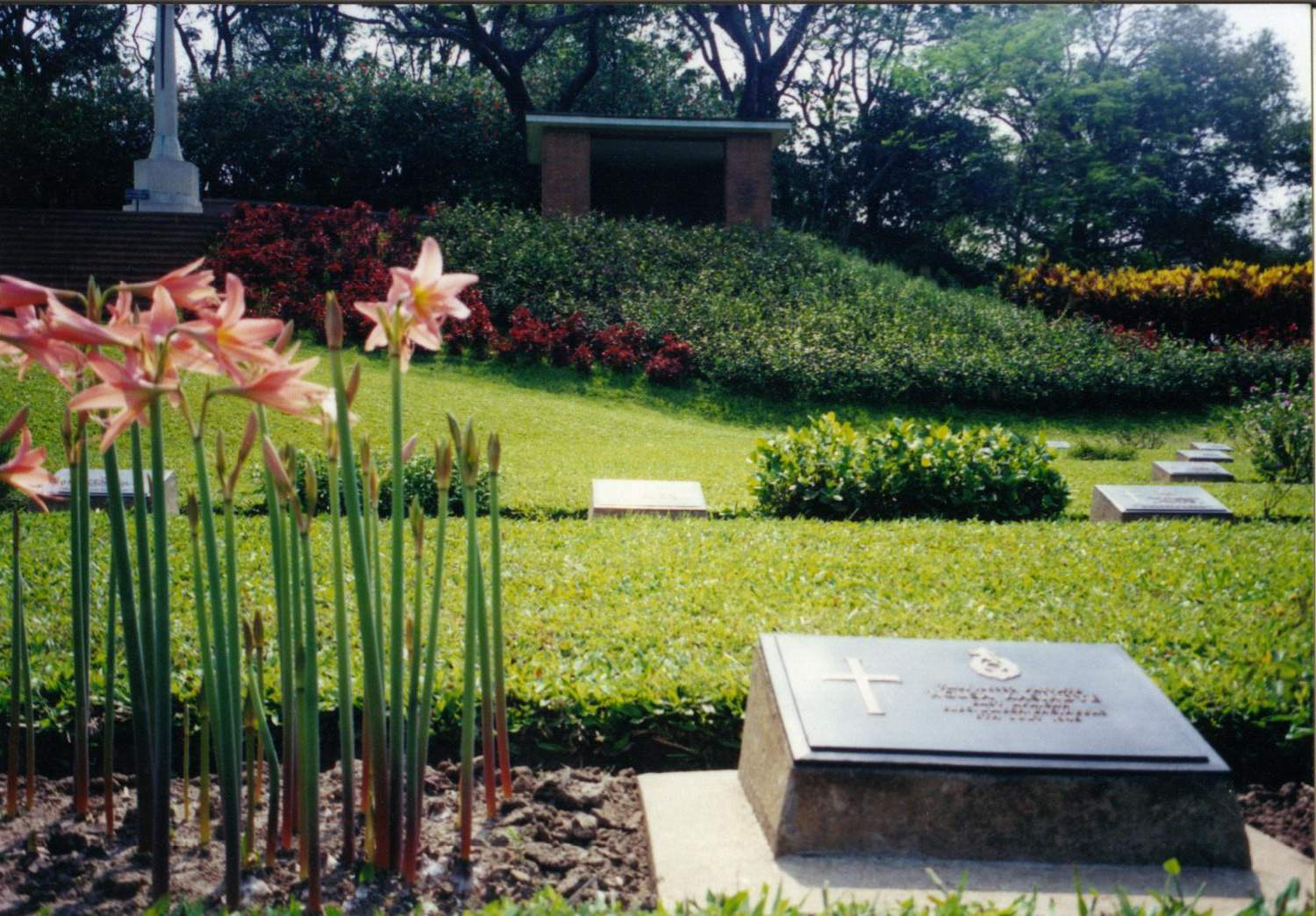

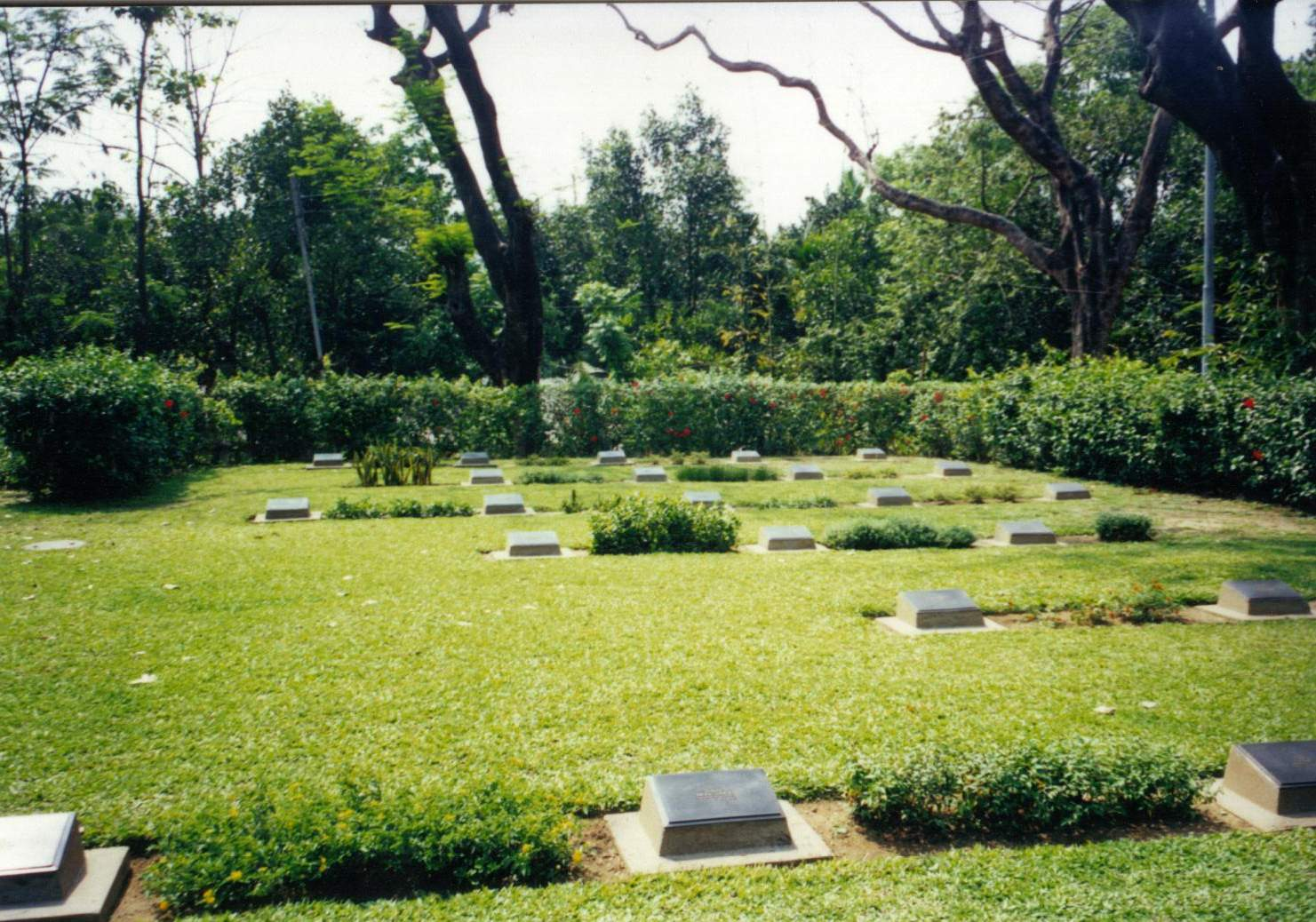

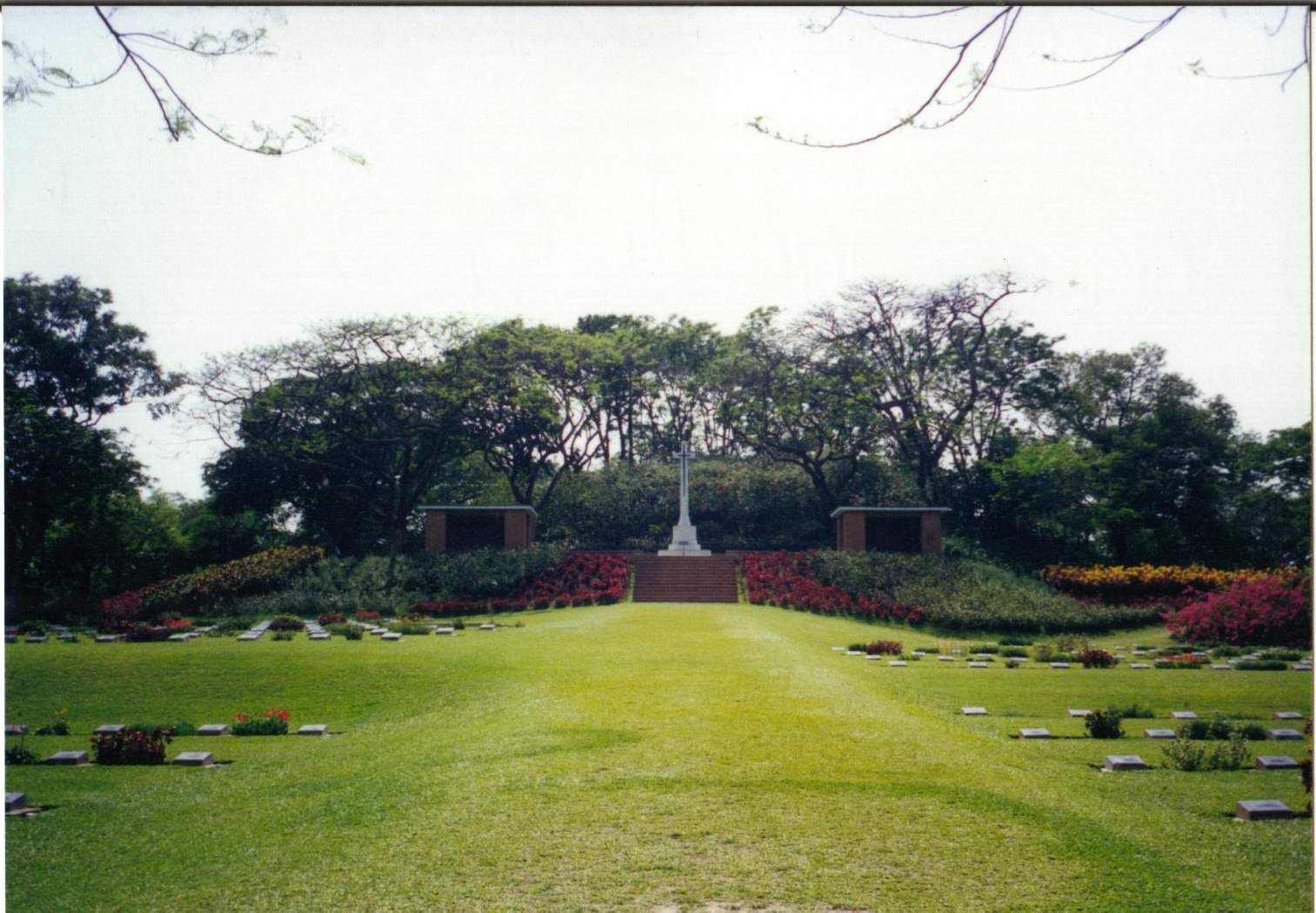

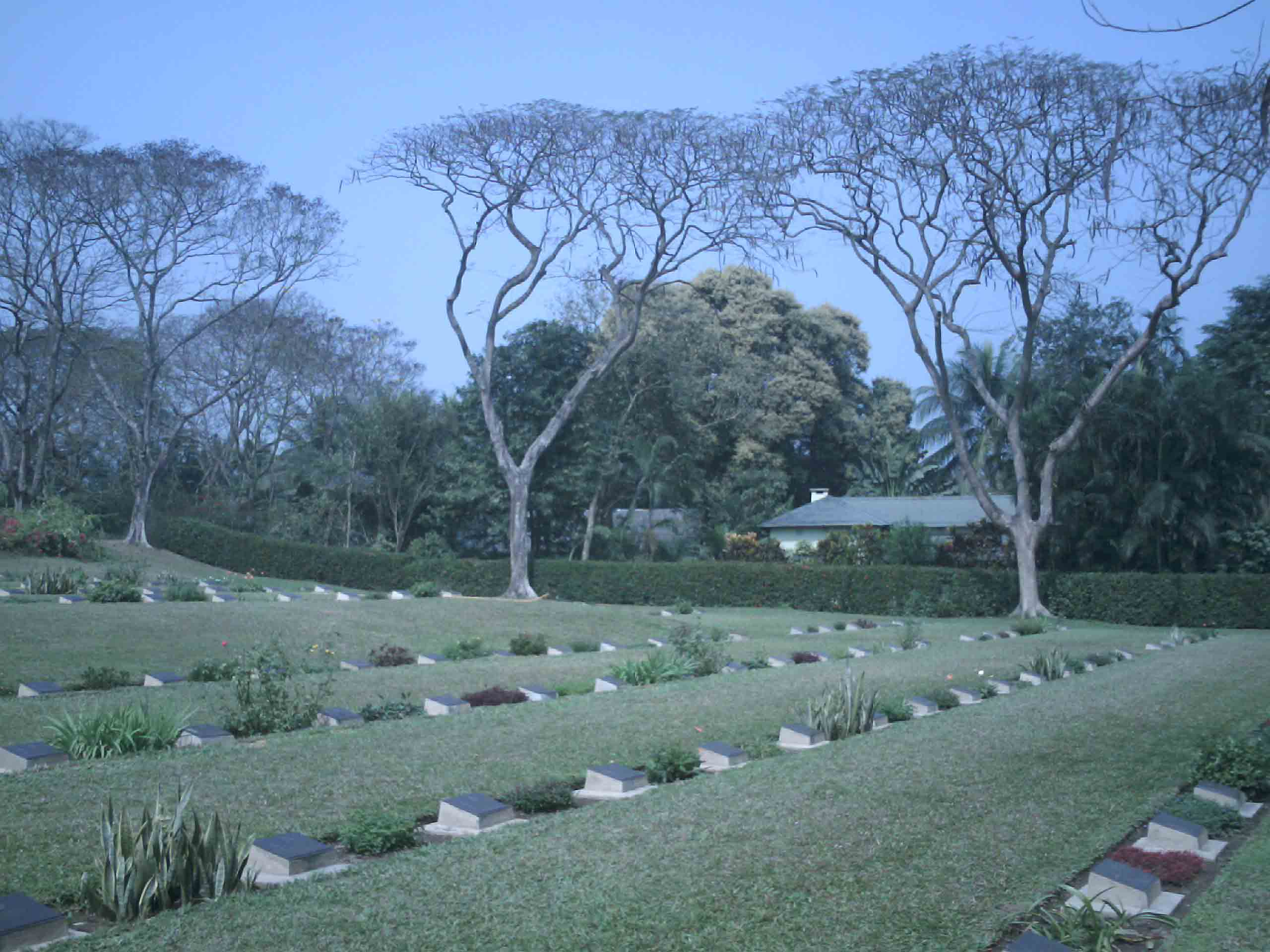

== See also ==
- Chittagong War Cemetery
