= Ashraful Islam (general) =

Bangladeshi general

Muhammad Ashraful Islam
- Born: 21 October 1968 (age 57); Lalmonirhat, East Pakistan, Pakistan
- Education: Bangladesh Military Academy; Defence Services Command and Staff College; Bangladesh University of Engineering and Technology; Rangpur Cadet College; National University
- Military career
- Allegiance: Bangladesh
- Branch: Bangladesh Army
- Service years: 1989–2024
- Rank: Major General
- Unit: Corps of Engineers
- Commands: Chairman of Bangladesh Tea Board; Senior Directing Staff (Army-3) of National Defence College; Commandant of Engineers Centre and School of Military Engineering; Station Commander, Ghatail
- Conflicts: UNMIS; UNMISS

Muhammad Ashraful Islam is a retired major general in the Bangladesh Army. He is a former chairman of the Bangladesh Tea Board. Earlier, he served as Senior Directing Staff (Army-3) at the National Defence College.

== Career ==
After completing his SSC and HSC at Rangpur Cadet College, Ashraful Islam joined the Bangladesh Army. He has served in UN missions as contingent 2IC (second-in-command) in the Demining Coy in Ethiopia/Eritrea under UNMEE and as Force Engineer at Force HQ in UNMIS and UNMISS. He also served as Director General at Sena Kalyan Sangstha and as Engineer Adviser at the Ministry of Defence. Additionally, he served as Director of Works, E in C's Branch at army headquarters.

Major General Islam joined the Bangladesh Tea Board as chairman on 14 July 2021. Before this, he was the senior directing staff at the National Defence College. He graduated with distinction from Rangpur Cadet College, earning his SSC and HSC.

On 22 December 1989, he was commissioned into the Corps of Engineers through the 21st BMA Long Course and joined the 5 RE Battalion in Postogola Cantonment. Throughout his extensive career, he has successfully held various key command, staff, and instructional positions within the Bangladesh Army. He has worked in different engineering units, served as the commandant of the Division Engineer Battalion in Comilla Cantonment, and held positions such as chief engineer at Sena Kalyan Sangstha, director of works at army headquarters, and engineer adviser at the Ministry of Defence.

He has also served as general staff officer-1 at the Army Training and Doctrine Command (ARTDOC), planning officer at Bangladesh University of Professionals (BUP), DA&AQMG at the 14 Independent Engineer Brigade, and garrison engineer (GE) in Chattogram Cantonment. As an instructor at the School of Military Engineering (SME) and commandant at the Engineer Centre and School of Military Engineering in Qadirabad Cantonment, Natore, he has imparted his knowledge and expertise to many.

Major General Islam is a graduate of the Defence Services Command and Staff College (DSCSC) and the National Defence College (NDC) in Mirpur. He holds a degree in civil engineering from Bangladesh University of Engineering and Technology (BUET) and an MSc in transportation engineering from the Military Institute of Science and Technology (MIST). Additionally, he has earned an MBA from Atish Dipankar University, an MSS in sustainable development (SD) from Bangladesh University of Professionals (BUP), and a master's in defence studies from the National University. Internationally, he completed the Engineer Officers Survey Course at the College of Military Engineering in India and served in significant roles in UN peacekeeping missions in Ethiopia-Eritrea and Sudan-South Sudan. He has participated in numerous international inspections, briefings, seminars, workshops, and conferences.

An avid traveler, the many countries he has visited include India, Dubai, Ethiopia, Eritrea, Italy, Sudan, Saudi Arabia, South Sudan, Uganda, Egypt, China, Singapore, Spain, France, Switzerland, the Netherlands, Belgium, South Korea, the United Kingdom, the United States, Malaysia, Turkey, and Rwanda. His wife, Tahmina Islam, is a senior teacher at Adamjee Cantonment School, and together they have three daughters.
