= Shalban Vihara =

Archaeological site in Mainamati, Comilla, Bangladesh

- শালবন বিহার (Bengali)
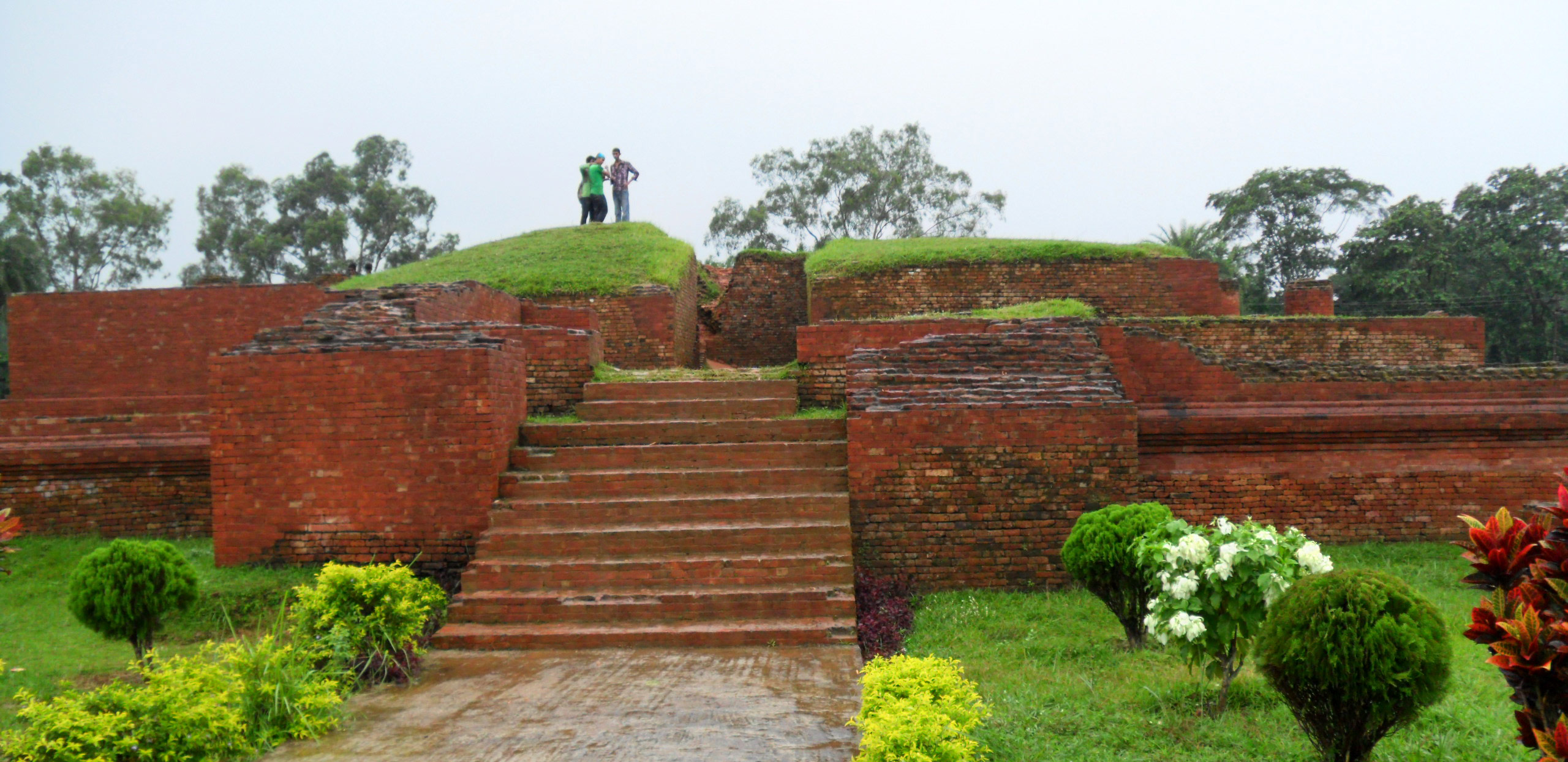
- Ruins of Shalban Vihara, Comilla, Bangladesh

- Location within Bangladesh Location within Southwest Asia
- 23.426234°N 91.1372098°E
- Location: Moinamoti, Comilla District, Chittagong Division, Bangladesh

History
- Built: 7th century

Shalban Vihara (Sanskrit; Bengali: শালবন বিহার Shalban Bihar) is an archaeological site in Moinamoti, Comilla, Bangladesh. The ruins are in the middle of the Lalmai hills ridge, and these are of a 7th-century Paharpur-style Buddhist Bihar with 115 cells for monks. It operated through the 12th century.

Excavations have revealed many archaeological artifacts dated to between the 7th and 12th centuries.

== History ==
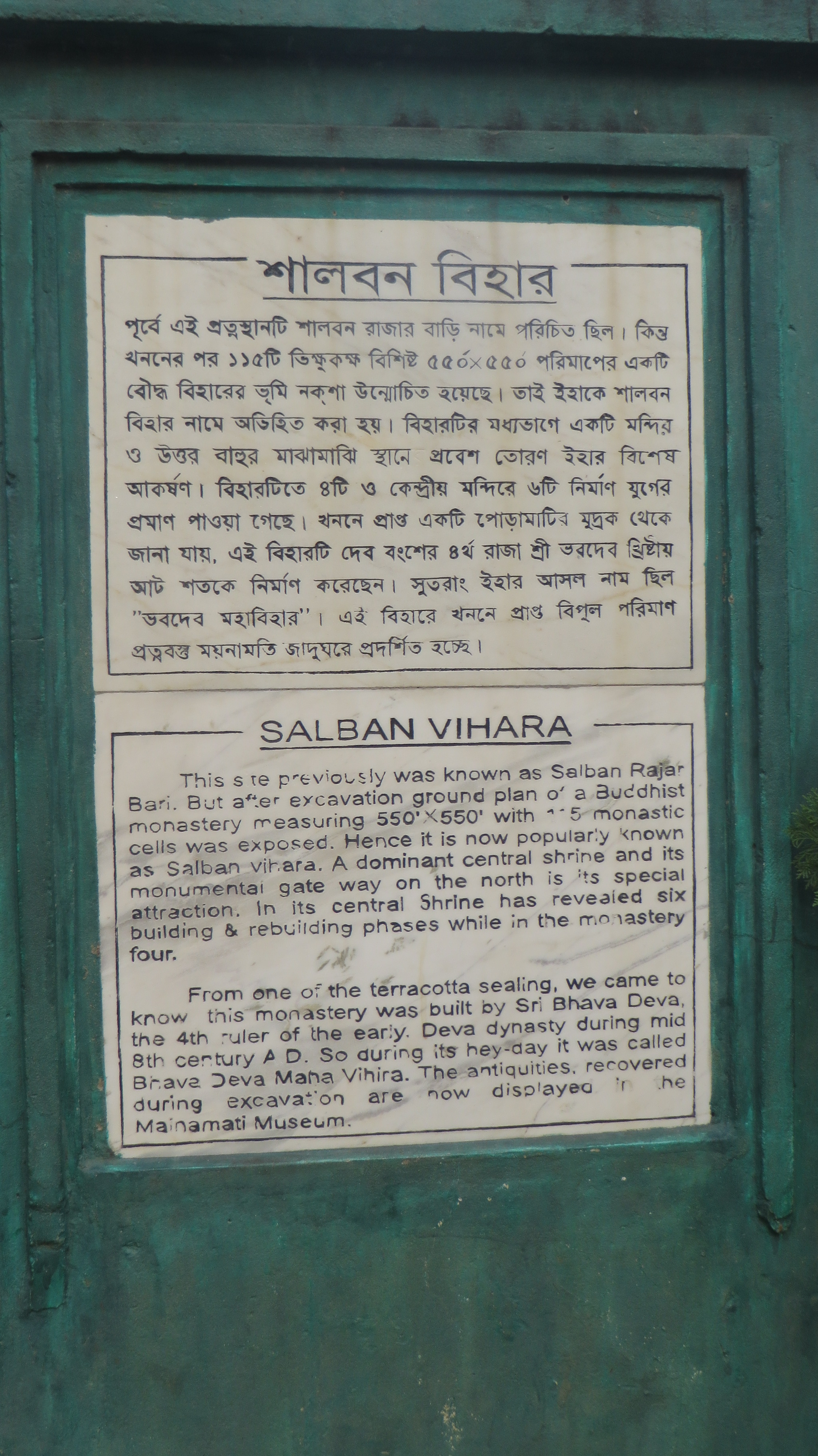
Introduction of Shalban Vihara in both English and Bengali language

The Vihara was founded in the eighth century by Bhava Deva, the fourth ruler of the Early-Deva dynasty. The 168 square meters site was built in or on the outskirts of Devaparvata, the Samatata capital bordering the Lalambi forest. The site was, previously known as Shalban Rajar Bari or King's residence at Shalban, was renamed Shalban vihara after archeological excavation revealed terracotta seals and copper plates identifying it as the remains of a residential Buddhist monastery.

== Geography ==
About eight kilometres west of Comilla town, lies a range of low hills known as the Mainamati-Lalmai range which is dotted with more than 50 ancient Buddhist settlements dating from the 8th to the 12th centuries. Almost at middle is the Shalvan Vihara of 115 cells built around a spacious courtyard with a cruciform temple in the centre. About 5 kilometres north of Shalvan Vihara is Kutila Mura, which is a picturesque relic of a unique Buddhist establishment.

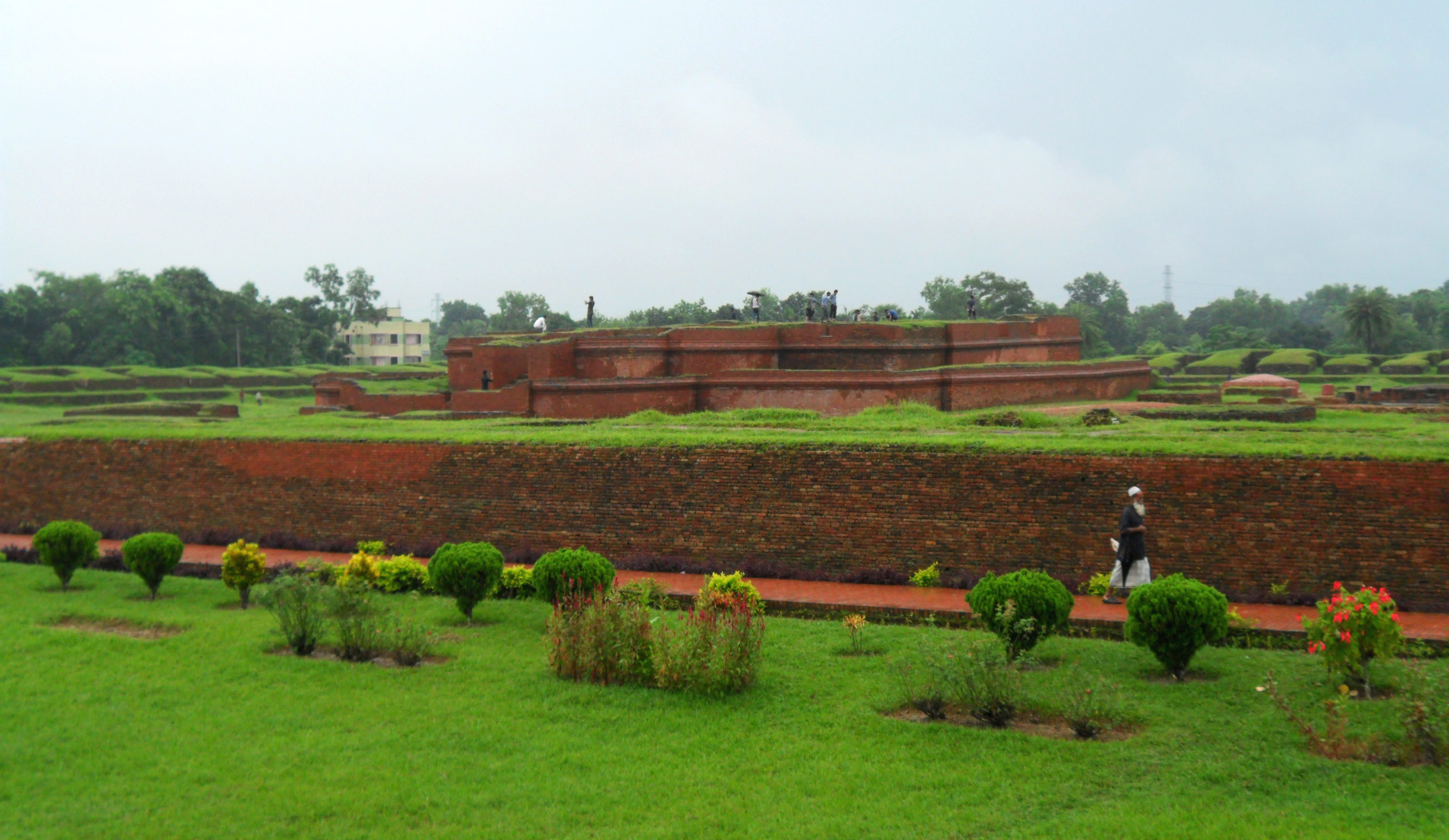
Shalban Vihara

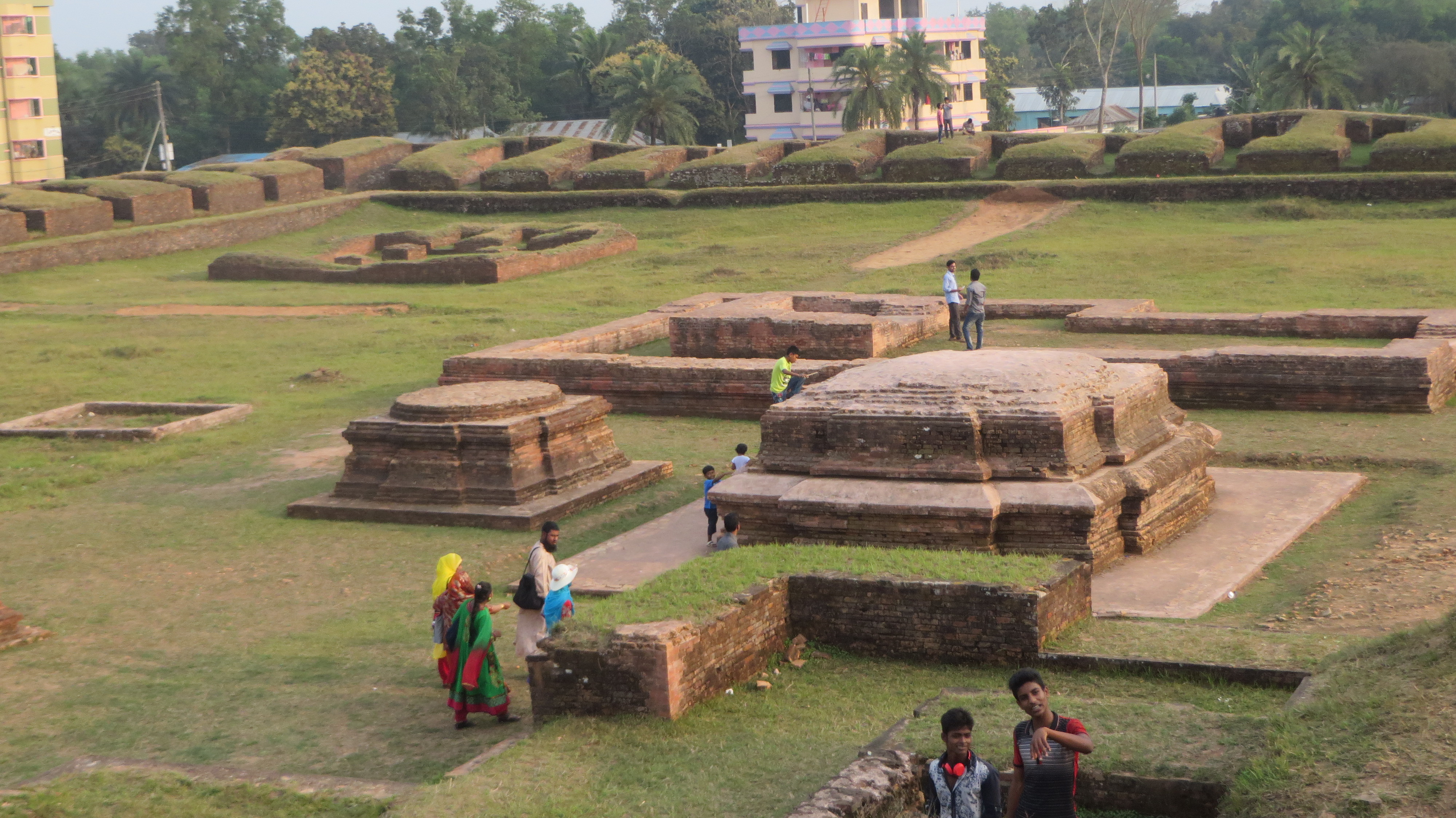
View of Shalban Vihara, Mainamati, Comilla

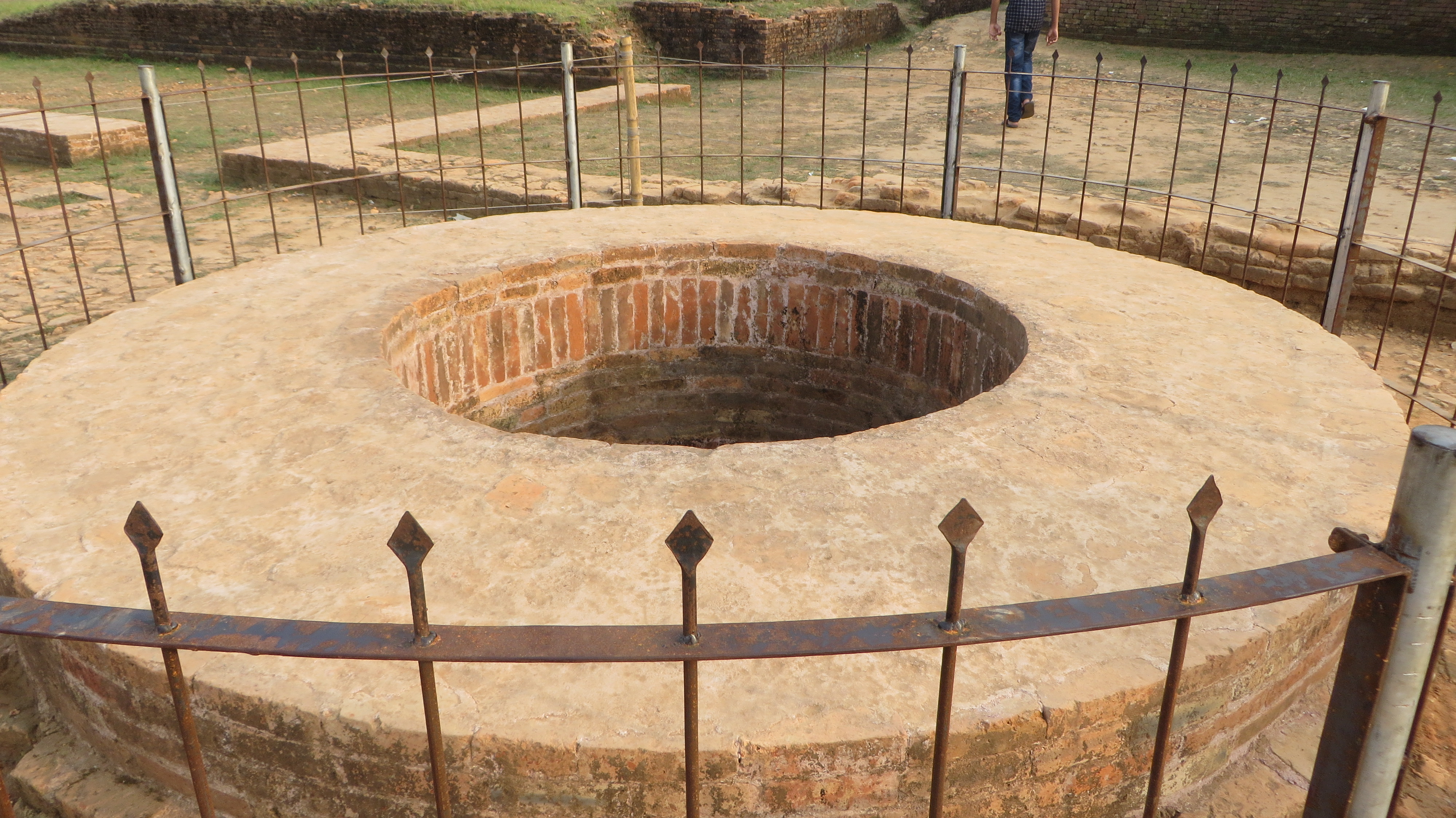
Newly discovered well in Shalban Vihara

== Architecture ==
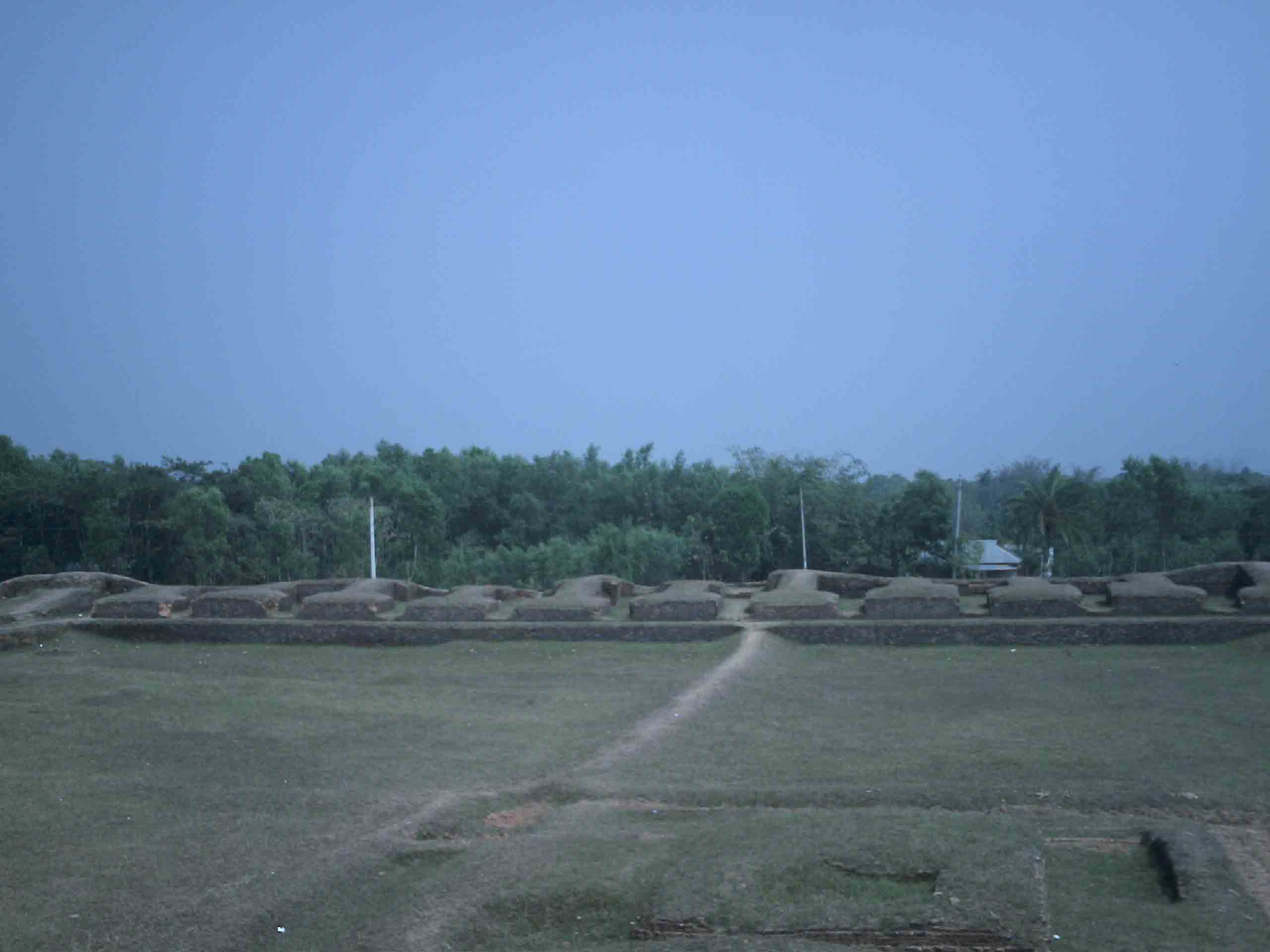
Central of Shalban Vihara

The large square monastery of 550-foot sides with 115 monastic cells, a dominant central shrine and a number of subsidiary shrines. Stupas and chapels, provides access through its monumental gateway on the north. While the central shrine revealed six building phases and the monastery four. The 1st and 2nd phases of the central shrine remains buried under the ruins of the 3rd, 4th and 5th periods but the remains of the 6th phase have been removed from the top. The cruciform central shrine of third built with the monastery as a single complex.

== See also ==
- Bagha Mosque
- Chawk Mosque
- Kantajew Temple
- Khan Mohammad Mridha Mosque
- Saat Masjid
- Shahbaz Khan Mosque
- Sixty Dome Mosque
- Lalbagh Fort
- List of archaeological sites in Bangladesh
