= Ashra =

Ashra may refer to:

- Ashra (band), a proto-trance group founded by Manuel Gottsching in 1976
- Ashra (All-sky Survey High Resolution Air-shower detector), a project of the Institute for Cosmic Ray Research

== See also ==
- Asherah, a Semitic mother goddess
