= Pandita Vihara =

Ancient Buddhist vihara

Pondit Bihar
- পণ্ডিত বিহার (Bengali)
- Pondit Bihar University
- Location of Pondit Bihar in Bangladesh
- Interactive map of Pondit Bihar
- 22.2236°N 91.8625°E
- Type: Bihār
- Periods: 8th–13th century CE
- Cultures: Tantric Buddhism
- Associated with: Buddhist scholers, monks
- Location: Deyang Hill, Anwara Upazila, Chattogram
- Region: East Bengal (present-day Bangladesh)

History
- Built: 8th century CE
- Abandoned: Likely 17th century CE
- Event: Decline due to regional conflicts

Site notes
- Discovered: Artifacts found in 1927 CE
- Proposed for reestablishment

Pondit Bihar or Pandita Bihar University was an ancient university of the Indian subcontinent established in the 8th century CE in eastern Bengal (present-day Bangladesh), in Chattogram, and it is now completely extinct. This Bihar was essentially an educational institution similar to Nalanda University, which operated as a center for teaching and propagating Tantric Buddhism in eastern Bengal. During a conflict in the 13th century, Nalanda Vihara in Bihar was destroyed, and many eastern Buddhist scholar communities later took refuge in Pondit Bihar. Atiśa Dīpaṅkara Śrījñāna, a Buddhist monk and missionary of the Pala Empire , stayed and studied for some time at Pondit Bihar.

The professors at Pondit Bihar, along with their teaching, studies, and yogic practices, also composed songs and dohas during their leisure time, which later gained recognition as Charyapada, the earliest known work of Bengali language and poetry. Before and after Pondit Bihar, and until approximately the mid-18th century, the name of no other educational institution is found in history.

== Location ==
There are various prevailing opinions regarding the location of Pondit Bihar. According to some discovered memorial artifacts, Tibet and Buddhist culture expert Sarat Chandra Das and other scholars and researchers have speculated that in the 8th century, the university was located on the hill adjacent to the present-day General Hospital in Chattogram city. According to many, it is assumed that the university was situated either at Chakrashala in Patiya Upazila of Chattogram or in the southern part of Deyang Hill in the villages of Jhiuri and Hajigaon in Anwara Upazila. Others believe it was located on Chandranath Hill in Sitakunda Upazila. However, based on most opinions, there is much evidence and data suggesting that the university was located on Deyang Hill. In February 1927 CE, 66 brass Buddha statues were discovered at the border of the villages of Jhiuri and Hajigaon on Deyang Hill in Anwara, which confirms evidence of the university's presence at this site.

== History and decline ==
The principal of Pondit Bihar was Tilopa, a Brahmin son residing in Chakrashala, Patiya. Regarding the origin of the name "Tilopa," it is known that during his Hindu life, his yogic companion earned a living by grinding sesame seeds (til), and thus he adopted the name Tilopa. Later, after embracing Tantric Buddhism, he took the name Prajñabhadra and was appointed principal of Pandita Vihara. The chief ācārya of Magadha, Naropa, received initiation from Prajñabhadra at Podit Bihar. Buddhist siddhācāryas and scholars such as Luipa, Shavaripa, Lāripa, Avadhūtapa, Amoghānātha, Dharmashrī, Maina, Buddhajñānapāda, and Anangavajra came to Pondit Bihar either as visitors or as professors. Researchers speculate that the name Pondit Bihar possibly originated from the gathering of various Buddhist scholars (Ponditas) at this monastery.

The cause of Pondit Bihar's decline is not known. It is believed that the university existed in the 8th century CE. In 1059 CE, after the King Anoratha of Burma conquered Chattogram and Pattikara, he abolished the prevailing Mahāyāna Buddhist tradition and began promoting the Hīnayāna or Theravāda sect. Later, in 1230 CE, the Buddhist king of Samatata, Damodar Deva (reigned 1230–1253 CE), conquered Pattikara along with Chattogram and ruled the region until 1253 CE. Historically, it is known that during the reign of King Damodar Deva, Pandita Vihara still existed in a flourishing state.

In the later century, in 1340 CE, the general Kadalkhan Gazi of Sonargaon’s Sultan Fakhruddin Mubarak Shah (reigned 1338–1350 CE) expelled the Arakanese from the Chattogram region and brought Chattogram under Muslim rule for the first time. Until 1580 CE, Chattogram remained under the rule of the independent Sultans and Afghan rulers of Bengal. It is assumed that during this period, the condition of Pondit Bihar became miserable. According to historical sources from Arakan, during that time, the kings of Arakan at times temporarily, and at times for extended periods, held control and governed the Chattogram region. In 1580 CE, the Arakanese king Min Phalaung defeated Afghan military ruler Jamal Khan Panni and annexed the entire Chattogram region into the Arakan kingdom. From that time until 27 January 1666 CE, Chattogram remained part of the Arakan kingdom. Historians believe that Pondit Bihar continued to exist even during this period. In 1666 CE, the Subahdar of Bengal, Shaista Khan, assigned his son Buzurg Umed Khan as his chief commander and sent him on an expedition to the Chattogram region. On 27 January 1666 CE, the Mughal soldiers captured the Chatigaon fort in Anwara Upazila and expelled the Maghs. During these battles, the ancient port town of Deyang in Chattogram was damaged, and it is assumed that as a result of this and the passage of time, Pandita Vihara eventually ceased to exist.

== Reestablishment ==
In 2012, a special delegation from the University Grants Commission conducted an on-site visit to the historical ruins of Pondit Bihar on Deyang Hill in Anwara. It has been decided that the university will be reestablished on approximately one hundred and fifty acres of hilly land, primarily funded jointly by China, Japan, Thailand, and Sri Lanka.

== Revival efforts ==
During her 2010 visit to China, Prime Minister Sheikh Hasina proposed reviving the ancient university as International Pondit University, following the footsteps of the revival of the ancient Nalanda University in India. As of 2016, the concept was still stalled due to lack of funding.
