= Ashraful Islam (politician) =

Bangladeshi politician

Member of Bangladesh Parliament
- In office 1973–1976

Personal details
- Party: Bangladesh Awami League

Ashraful Islam (Bengali: আশরাফুল ইসলাম) is a Bangladesh Awami League politician and a former member of parliament for Rajshahi-16.

== Early life ==
Ashraful Islam was born on February 19, 1923, in the village of Tajpur in Singra, Natore, Rajshahi. His father was Ghasiullah, and his mother was Azjan Bibi.

== Career ==
Islam was elected to parliament from Rajshahi-16 as an Awami League candidate in 1973.

== Death ==
Islam died on 8 March 1991.
