= Board of Intermediate and Secondary Education, Cumilla =

Education board in Bangladesh

Coordinates: 23.456997°N 91.179539°E

The Board of Intermediate and Secondary Education, Cumilla
- Bangladesh

Information
- Website: Official Website

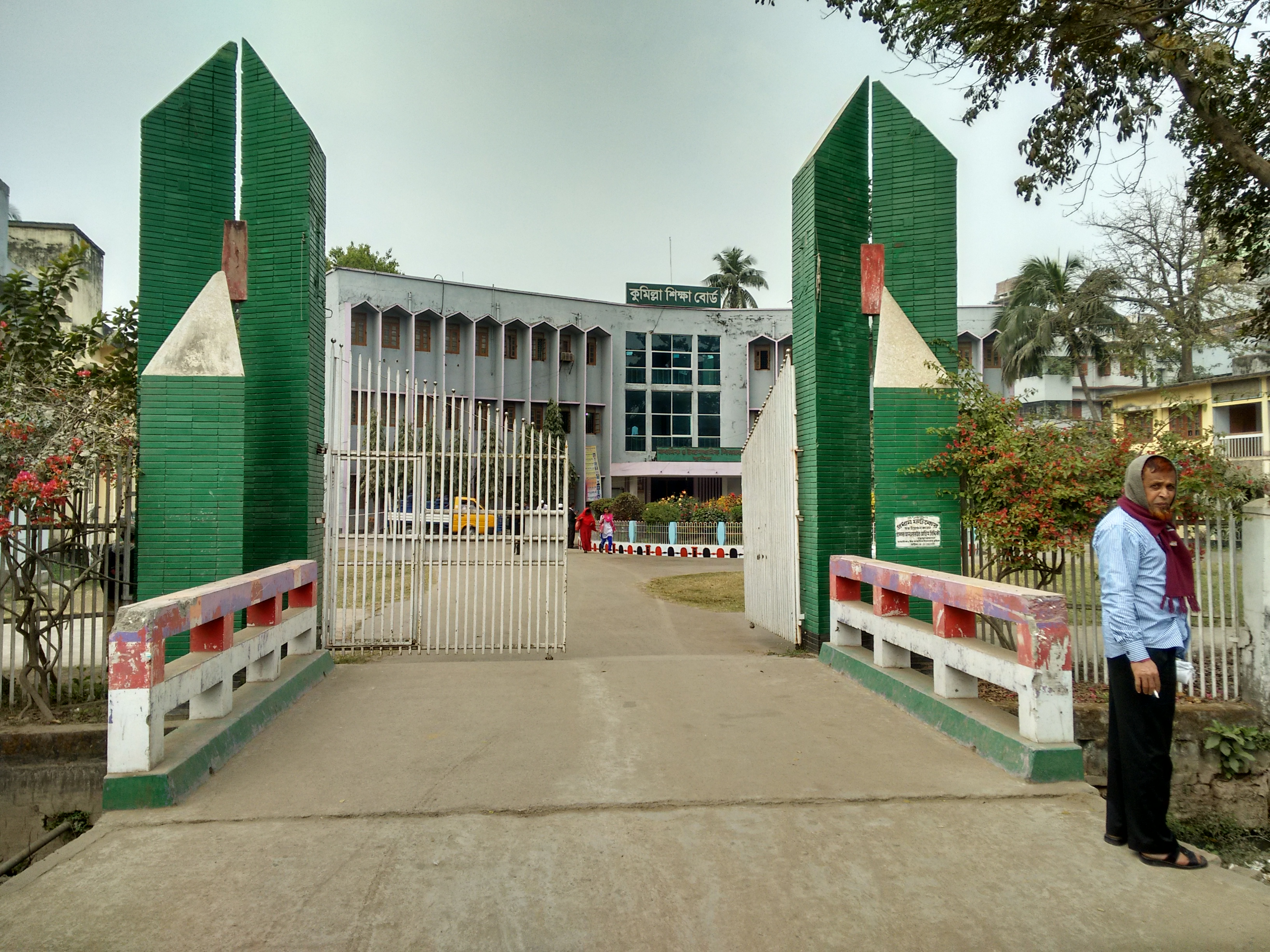
Front of the board building

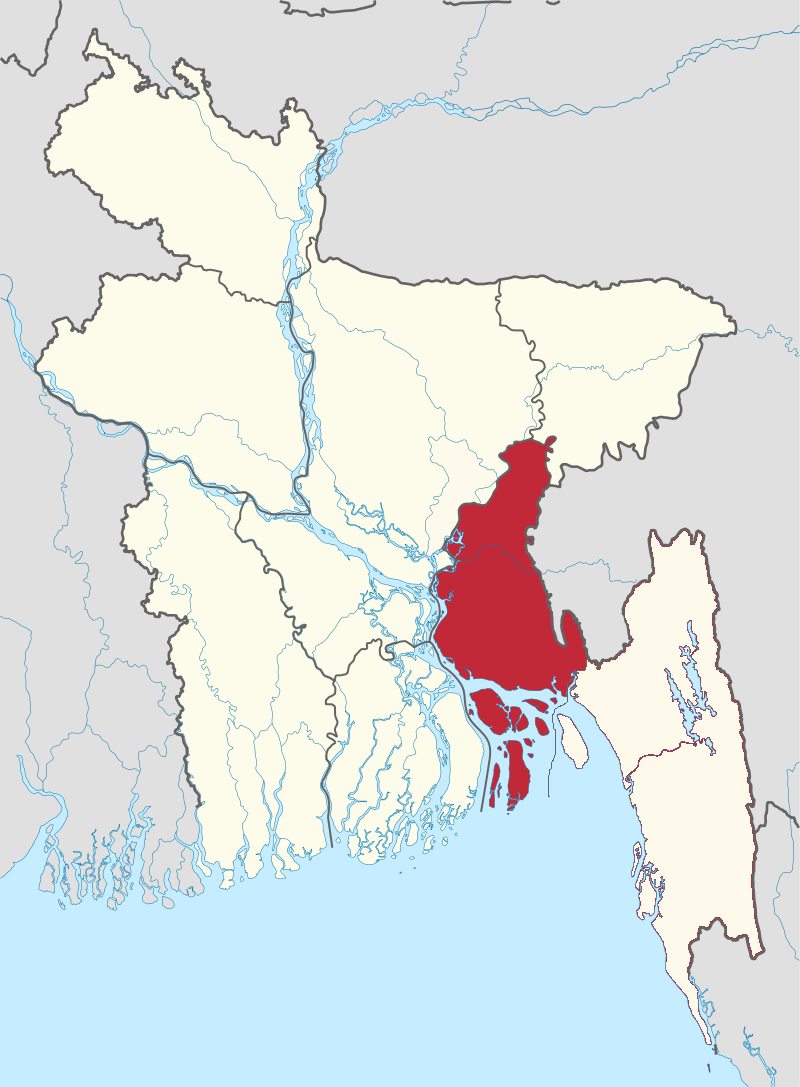
Cumilla Board served the proposed Comilla Division area

The Board of Intermediate and Secondary Education, Cumilla is an autonomous organization that is responsible for holding public examinations Secondary School Certificate (S.S.C.) and Higher Secondary (School) Certificate (H.S.C) in the Cumilla District and five nearby districts of Cumilla Division.

== History ==
The board was established in 1962 under The Intermediate and Secondary Education Ordinance, 1961 (East Pakistan Ordinance) (Ordinance NO. XXXIII OF 1961) which was amended on 1977 as Intermediate and Secondary Education (Amendment) Ordinance, 1977 (Ordinance No. XVII of 1977).

The present chairperson of the board is Md. Shamsul Islam.

== District under Cumilla Education Board ==
- Brahmanbaria District
- Chandpur District
- Comilla District
- Feni District
- Lakshmipur District
- Noakhali District

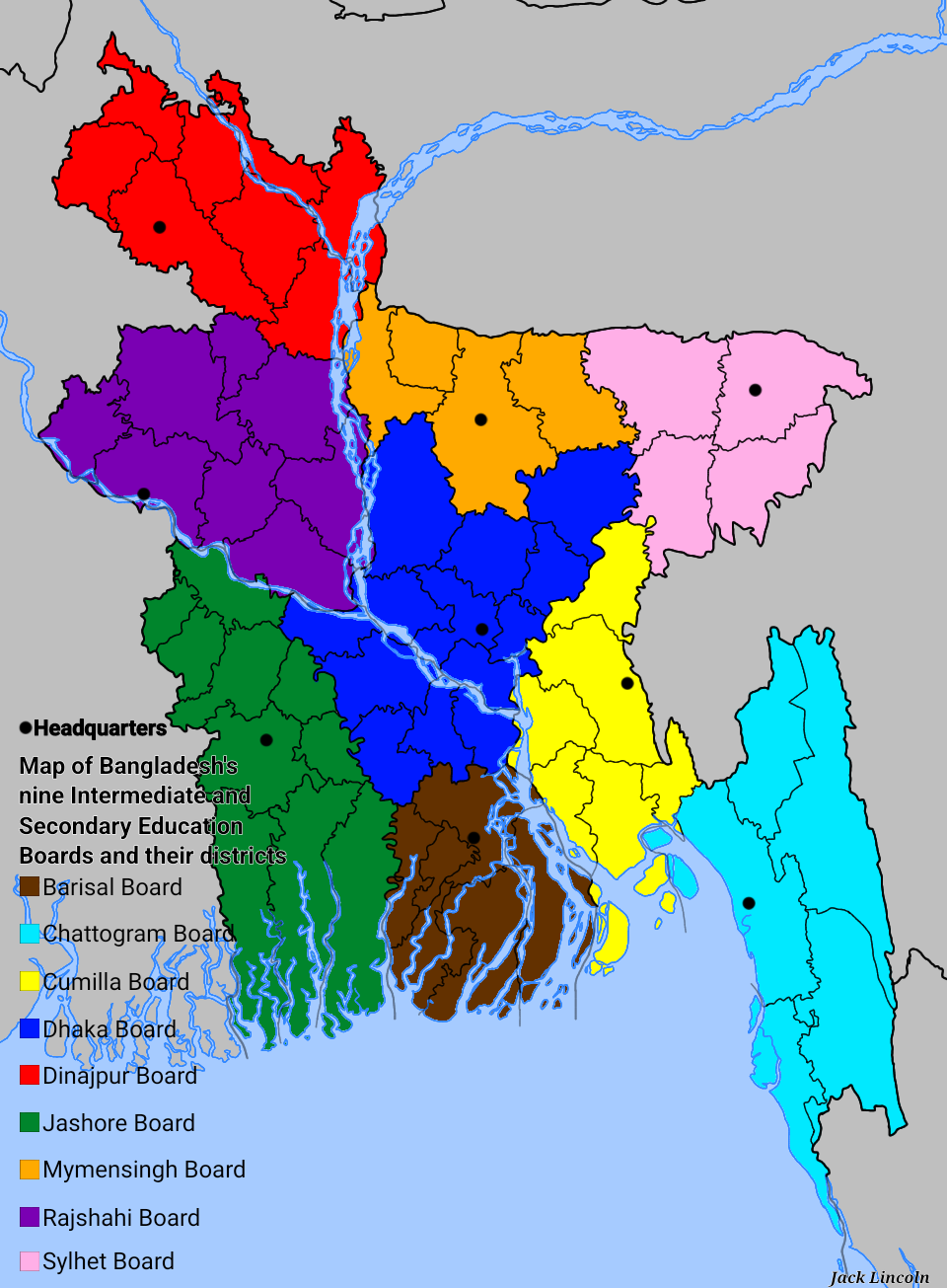
Map of Bangladesh's nine Intermediate and Secondary Education Boards and their districts

== Prominent educational institutions ==
Prominent educational institutions under the board are following:

- Comilla Government City College
- Barkota School And College
- Comilla Zilla School
- Cumilla Cadet College
- Nawab Faizunnesa Government Girls' High School
- Ispahani Public School & College, Comilla
- Comilla Victoria Government College
- Nawab Faizunnesa Government College
- Comilla Government College
- Comilla Government Women's College
- Ibne Taimiya School and College
- Comilla Residential School and College
- Noakhali Zilla School
- Comilla Modern High School
- Government Laboratory High School, Comilla
- Adhyapak Abdul Majid College
- Comilla Girls' College
- Annada Government High School
- Feni Government College
- Feni Government Girls' High School
- Feni Government Pilot High School
- Feni Girls' Cadet College
- Gobindapur High school
- Gunabati High School
- Gunabati Al Farabi High School
- Gunabati Girls' High School
- Hasan Ali Government High School
- Chandkora Sakandar Ali Secondary School
- Juranpur Adarsha University college

== See also ==
- List of Intermediate and Secondary Education Boards in Bangladesh
- List of Educational Institutions in Comilla
