= CCN University of Science & Technology =

Private university in Bangladesh

Coordinates: 23.4163°N 91.1254°E

- Motto: Communicative Computing for NextGeneration
- Type: Private
- Established: 2014; 12 years ago
- Affiliations: University Grants Commission
- Chairman: Md. Tariqul Islam Chowdhury
- Chancellor: President Mirza Fakhrul Islam Alamgir
- Vice-Chancellor: Dr. Md. Shah Jahan
- Students: About 1100 (as per 10 march 2021)
- Location: Kotbari, Comilla, Bangladesh
- Website: www.ccnust.ac.bd

CCN University of Science and Technology is a private university in Kotbari, Comilla Sadar Dakshin Upazila, Comilla District, Bangladesh, established in 2014. It was founded by Md. Tariqul Islam Chowdhury.Dr. Md. Shah Jahan is the current vice chancellor of this university. The university has over 2000 Alumni and about 1100 current students.

== Faculties ==
4 faculties with 9 departments

Faculty of Engineering:

- Department of Computer Science and Engineering
  - B.Sc in Computer Science and Engineering [Date of Approval: 22-11-2017]
- Department of Electrical and Electronic Engineering
  - B.Sc in Electrical and Electronic Engineering [Date of Approval: 22-11-2017]
- Department of Civil Engineering
  - B.Sc in Civil Engineering [Date of Approval: 11-03-2018]

Faculty of Science:

- Department of Mathematics
  - B.Sc in Mathematics [Date of Approval: 18-05-2015]
- Department of Social Science
  - BSS in Economics [Date of Approval: 18-05-2015]

Faculty of Liberal Arts:

- Department of Bangla
  - Bachelor of Arts in Bengali [Date of Approval: 18-05-2015]
- Department of English
  - Bachelor of Arts in English [Date of Approval: 18-05-2015]
- Department of Law
  - Bachelor of Law(LL.B) [Date of Approval: 18-05-2015]
  - Master of Law (LL.M) [Date of Approval: 18-05-2015]

Faculty of Business Administration:

- Department of Business Administration
  - Bachelor of Business Administration (BBA) [Date of Approval: 18-05-2015]
  - Masters of Business Administration (MBA) [Date of Approval: 18-05-2015]

== See also ==
- List of Educational Institutions in Comilla
- Comilla University
- Bangladesh Army International University of Science & Technology
- Britannia University
