= Eastern Medical College =

Private medical college in Bangladesh

- ইস্টার্ন মেডিকেল কলেজ
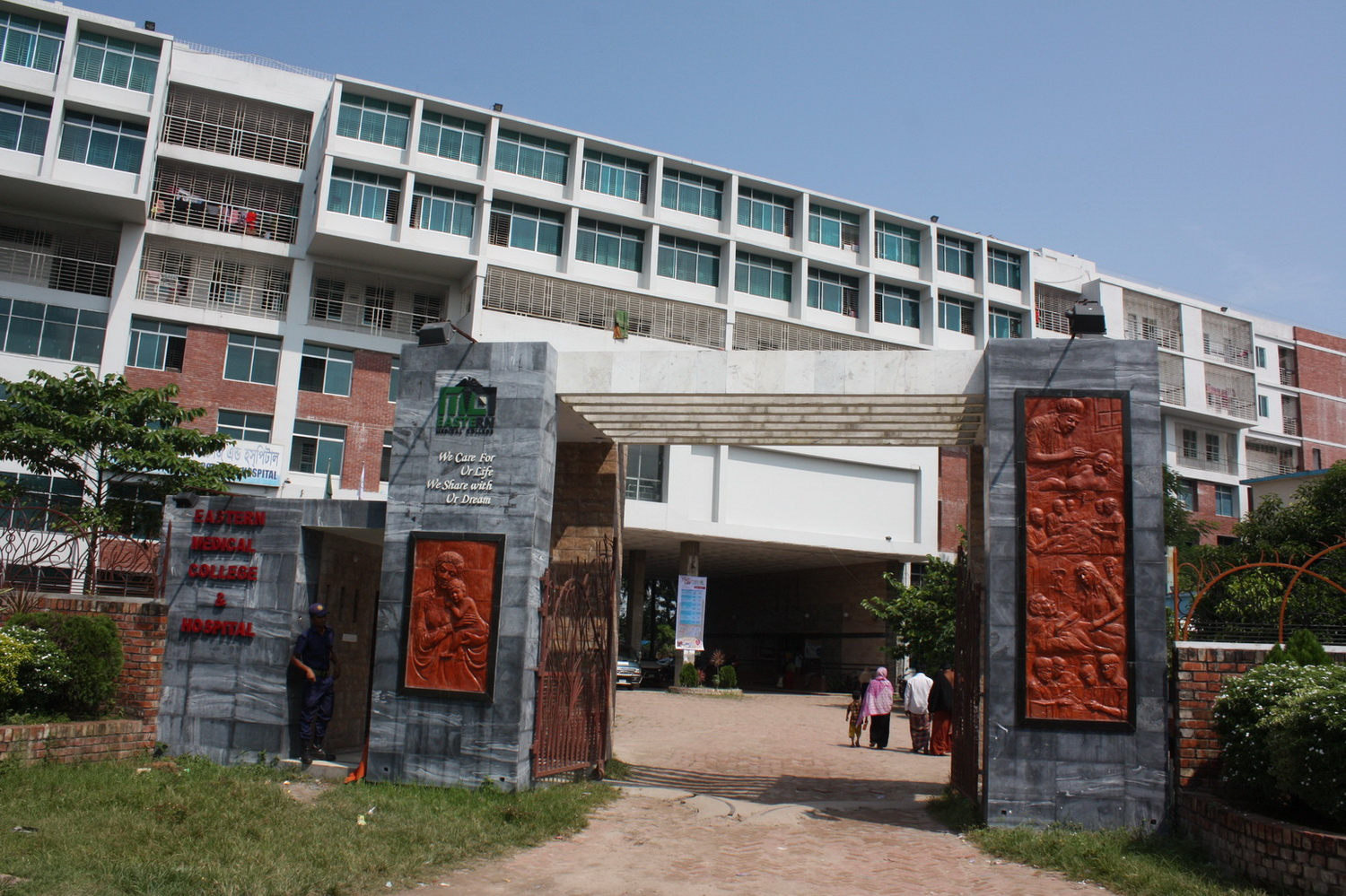
- Main gate and south facade of main building
- Other name: EMC
- Type: Private medical school
- Established: 2005
- Academic affiliations: Chittagong Medical University
- Chairman: Md. Azizul Haque
- Principal: Md. Zakirul Islam
- Academic staff: 76 (2026)
- Students: 575
- Location: Kabila, Burichang Upazila, Comilla District, Bangladesh; 23.4790°N 91.0733°E
- Campus: Rural
- Language: English
- Website: https://www.emccomilla.com/index_php.html

Eastern Medical College (Bengali: ইস্টার্ন মেডিকেল কলেজ) is a private medical school situated in Bangladesh, established in 2005. It is located beside the Dhaka-Chittagong Highway at Kabila in Burichang Upazila of Comilla District. It is affiliated with Chittagong Medical University.

It offers a five-year course of study leading to an MBBS degree. A one-year internship after graduation is compulsory for all graduates. The degree is recognised by the Bangladesh Medical and Dental Council.

The college has an attached 600-bed hospital. Eastern Medical College Journal is the official journal of the college.

== History ==
Eastern Medical College was established in 2005. Instruction began at a temporary campus in July of that year. The college moved to its current location in 2009.

== Campus ==
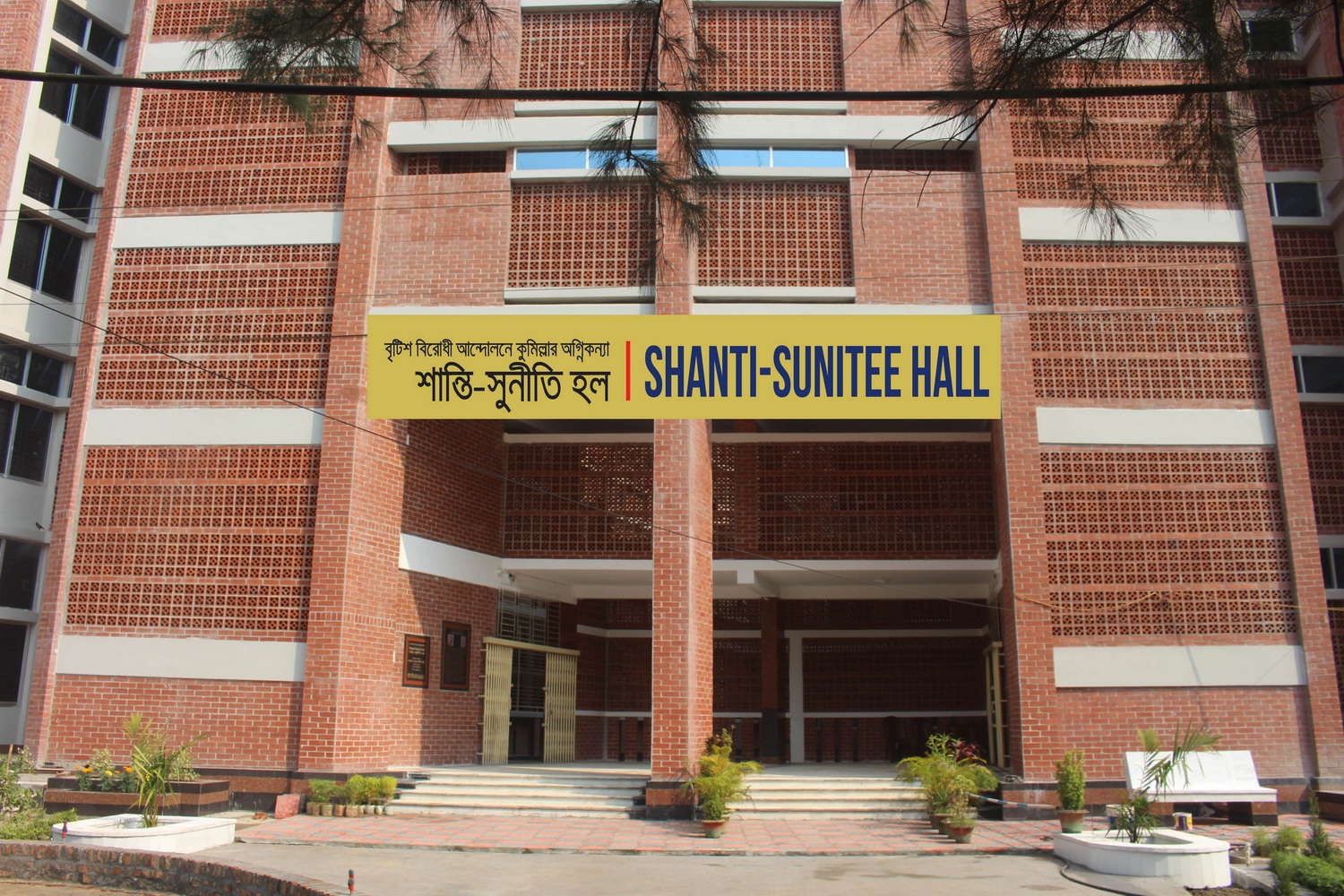
Women's hostel, named after two girls who assassinated a district magistrate

The campus is located on the north side of the Dhaka–Chittagong Highway at Kabila in Burichang Upazila of Comilla District. The 5-acre (2.0 ha) campus contains two multi-story academic buildings and an attached 600-bed hospital. There are also separate six-story hostels for men and women, and a dormitory for interns and doctors. Other amenities include a canteen, playing field, basketball court, pond, and mosque.

Major Gani Hall is the 364-bed men's hostel, named after Major Abdul Gani. Shanti-Sunitee Hall is the 336-bed women's hostel, named after Santi Ghose and Suniti Choudhury, the assassins of a district magistrate in 1931.

== Organization and administration ==
The college has been affiliated with Chittagong Medical University since 2017. Before that, it was affiliated with the University of Chittagong. As of February 2026, the acting principal of the college is Md. Zakirul Islam.

=== Principals ===
The following individuals have served as the principals of Eastern Medical College since its establishment:

Serial No.	Name	Tenure	
Serial No.	Name	Start	End
1.	Habibur Rahman Ansari	2005/05/14	2005/09/01
2.	Sayed Sharafat Ali (acting)	2005/09/02	2006/03/31
3.	Farida Adib Khanam	2006/04/01	2009/07/28
4.	Abu Mohammad Nurul Ahad (acting)	2009/07/29	2009/08/31
5.	Golam Samdani (acting)	2009/09/01	2010/05/09
6.	Golam Samdani	2010/05/10	2019/12/31
7.	Md. Kalim Ullah	2020/01/01	2023/12/31
8.	Ruhini Kumar Das	2024/01/01	
9.	Md. Zakirul Islam (acting)		present

== Academics ==
The college offers a five-year course of study, approved by the Bangladesh Medical and Dental Council (BMDC), leading to a Bachelor of Medicine, Bachelor of Surgery (MBBS) degree. The degree is awarded by Chittagong Medical University. After passing the final professional exam, there is a compulsory one-year internship. The internship is a prerequisite for obtaining registration from the BMDC to practice medicine. In November 2024, the Ministry of Health and Family Welfare capped admission and tuition fees at private medical colleges at 2,544,000 Bangladeshi taka (US$21,300 as of 2024) total for their five-year courses.

The college is also recognised by the Bangladesh College of Physicians and Surgeons for post-graduate training in five disciplines: internal medicine, general surgery, gynaecology, paediatrics, and dermatology.

Admission for Bangladeshis to the MBBS programme at all medical colleges in Bangladesh is conducted centrally. The Directorate General of Health Services (DGHS) sets a written multiple-choice question exam. On a given day the exam is administered simultaneously across the country. Candidates are admitted based primarily on their score on this test. Grades at the Secondary School Certificate (SSC) and Higher Secondary School Certificate (HSC) level also play a part. Admission for foreign students is based on their SSC and HSC grades. As of 2025, the college is allowed to admit 115 students annually.

== Journal ==
Eastern Medical College Journal is the official journal of the college. It is a peer-reviewed, open access journal, published twice a year in January and July. It accepts original research articles, review articles, case reports, short communications, and editorials. Submissions should not have been published previously, and should not be submitted to multiple publications concurrently.

== Notable alumni ==
- Tahseen Bahar Shuchona, former mayor of Cumilla City Corporation

== See also ==
- List of medical colleges in Bangladesh
- List of educational institutions in Comilla District
