= List of educational institutions in Comilla District =

This is a list of universities, colleges, and schools in Comilla District of Bangladesh.

== Universities ==
University	Acronym	Established	Location
Comilla University	CoU	2006	Kotbari, Comilla
Britannia University	BU	2010	Paduar Bazar Highway, Comilla
CCN University of Science & Technology	CCNUST	2015	Kotbari, Comilla
Bangladesh Army International University of Science & Technology	BAIUST	2015	Cumilla Cantonment

== Law colleges ==
There are two private law colleges in the district.

Name	Established	Location
Bangabandhu Law College		Kandirpar, Comilla
Comilla Law College		Nazrul Avenue, Comilla

== Medical colleges ==
Medical college	Acronym	Established	Location
Comilla Medical College	CoMC	1992	Kuchaitoli, Comilla
Army Medical College Cumilla	AMCC	2014	Cumilla Cantonment
Central Medical College	CeMeC	2005	Paduar Bazar Highway, Comilla
Eastern Medical College	EMC	2005	Kabila, Burichang
Mainamoti Medical College	MMMCH	2011	Barapara, Comilla

== Honours colleges ==
These are honours colleges (under National University, Bangladesh) situated in the district.

University college	Established	Location
Comilla Victoria Government College	1899	Comilla
Cumilla Government College	1964	Comilla
Comilla Government Women's College	1960	Comilla
Nawab Faizunnesa Government College	1943	Laksam
Lalmai Govt. College	1969	Sadar South
Badiul Alam College	1969	Muradnagar
Debidwar S. A. Govt. College	1968	Debidwar
Dollai Nawabpur Govt. College	1970	Chandina
Al-Haj Noor Mia College	1972	Chauddagram
Borura Shahid Smriti Govt. College	1972	Barura
Ajit Guha College	1970	Comilla
Comilla Shikkha Board Govt. Model College	2008	Comilla
Chandina Mohila Degree College	1997	Chandina
Jafarganj Mir Abdul Gafur College	1986	Debidwar
Debidwar Alhaj Jobeda Khatun Mahila College	1992	Debidwar
Juranpur Adarsha College	1993	Daudkandi
Kurerpar Adarsha College	1996	Muradnagar
Mosharrof Hossain Khan Chowdhury College	1999	Brahmanpara
Nangalkot Model Mohila College	1998	Nangalkot
Nangalkot Hasan Memorial Degree College	1984	Nangalkot
Nimsar Junab Ali College	1972	Burichang
Aganagar College	1995	Barura
Chandina Redwan Ahmed College	1980	Chandina
Sonar Bangla College	2000	Burichang

== Degree colleges ==
These are bachelor's degree (pass) colleges (under National University, Bangladesh) situated in Comilla District.

Degree college	Established	Location
Sreekail Govt. College	1941	Muradnagar
Gunabati College	1968	Chauddagram
Hasanpur S. N. Govt. College	1969	Duadkandi
Poyalgacha College	1969	Barura
Gouripur Munshi Fazlur Rahman Govt. College	1969	Daudkandi
Shahebabad College	1970	Brahmanpara
Chauddagram Govt. College	1972	Chauddagram
Comilla Mahila College	1984	Adarsha Sadar, Comilla
Chowara Adarsha College	1972	Sadar South
Amir Hossain Zobeda College	1972	Brahmanpara
Homna Degree College	1984	Homna
Homnabad Adarsha Degree College	1985	Nangalkot
Nurul Amin Mazumder College	1986	Laksam
Burichang Ershad College	1986	Burichang
Nilkanta Degree College	1986	Monohorgonj
Jafarganj Mir Abdul Gafur Degree College	1986	Debidwar
Chiora Govt. College	1987	Chauddagram
Natherpetua Degree College	1992	Monohorgonj
Chota Sharifpur Degree College	1993	Lalmai
Juranpur Adarsha Degree College	1993	Daudkandi
Adda Degree College	1994	Barura
Shah Sharif Degree College	1994	Monohorgonj
Kashinagar Degree College	1994	Chauddagram
Munshirhat Degree College	1994	Chauddagram
Haidarabad Begum Jahanara Hoque College	1994	Muradnagar
Banskait Barrister Rafiqul Islam Mia Degree College	1994	Muradnagar
Adhyapak Abdul Majid College	1995	Muradnagar
Farid Uddin Sarkar Degree College	1995	Muradnagar
Al-Haj Noor Mia Degree College	1995	Chauddagram
Sankuchail Degree College	1995	Burichang
Kazi Noman Ahmed Degree College	1995	Muradnagar
Chand Miah Molla Degree College	1995	Muradnagar
Rehana College (Technical & Commerce)	1996	Barura
Mia Bazar Degree College	1996	Chauddagram
Anandapur Degree College	1996	Adarsha Sadar
Dhanuakhala Adarsha Public Degree College	1996	Adarsha Sadar
Heshakhal Bazar Naem Nizam College	1996	Nangalkot
Govt. Manikarchar College	1997	Meghna
Kalikapur Abdul Matin Khasru Govt. College	1997	Burichang
Madhaiya Muktijoddha Smriti College	1999	Chandina

== College ==
- Ispahani Cantonment Public School & College
- Adhyapak Abdul Majid College
- Comilla Government City College
- Comilla Commerce College
- Ruposhi Bangla College
- Comilla Science College
- Comilla City College
- Alekjan Memorial College
- Comilla Cambrian College
- Comilla Mohanagar College
- C.C.N Model College
- Comilla Pathshala College
- Comilla Residential College

== Schools ==
These are schools situated in the district.

Name	Established	Location
Comilla Zilla School	1837	Shahid Munshi Kabir Uddin Rd, Comilla
Comilla Victoria Collegiate School	1886	Monohorpur, Comilla
Nawab Faizunnesa Government Girls' High School	1873	Badurtala, Comilla
Payerkhola Govt. High School	1882	Jogonnathdhigi, Chauddagram
Comilla High School	1878	Mogaltuli, Comilla
Comilla Yusuf High School	1879	Comilla
Comilla Cantonment High School	1956	Comilla Cantonment
Cantonment Board Girls' High School	1989	Comilla Cantonment
Comilla Modern High School	1993	Nazrul Avenue, Comilla
Ibn Taimiya School and College	1979	EPZ Road, Comilla
Ispahani Cantonment Public School & College	1962	Cumilla Cantonment, Cumilla
Government Laboratory High School	1967	Kotbari, Adarsha Sadar
Railway Public High School	1964	Dharmapur, Adarsha Sadar
Police Line High School	1977	Police Line, Comilla
Our Lady Of Fatima Girls' High School	1950	Kandirpar, Comilla
Laksam Government Pilot High School	1923	Laksam
Laksam Pilot Girls' High School	1927	Laksam
Abdul Malek Institution (Railway High School)	1950	Laksam
Al Amin Institute	1983	Paschimgaon, Laksam
GBD Amir Hamza High School	1983	Doira, Muradngar
Bagmara High School	1921	Bagmara, Lalmai
Gaiar Bhanga High School	1938	Gaiar Bhanga Bazar, Lalmai
Shakera R A High School	1950	Shakera, Lalmai
Chota Sharifpur Mult. High School	1968	Chota Sharifpur, Lalmai
Premnol High School	1973	Premnol, Lalmai
Juktikhola High School	1972	Juktikhola, Lalmai
Kanoksree High School	1984	Kanoksree, Lalmai
Suruj Memorial High School	1994	Belghor, Lalmai
Lalmai High School	1987	Boro Dharmapur, Sadar South
Kashinagar B. M. High School	1945	Kashinagar, Chauddagram
Gunabati Al Farabi High School	1983	Gunabati, Chauddagram
Gunabati Girls' High School	1987	Gunabati, Chauddagram
Haidarabad Hazi E. A. B. High School	1986	Muradnagar
Afzal Khan Jalua Para Girls High School	1991	Adarsha Sadar
Homna Adarsha High School	1989	Homna
Chauddagram HJ Govt. Model Pilot High School	1920	Chauddagram
Bangladesh Academy for Rural Development (BARD)	1959	Kotbari, Adarsha Sadar
Beltoli High School	1968	Sadar South
Burichang Ananda Pilot Govt. High School	1920	Burichang
Akubpur E. A. B. P. High School	1939	Akubpur, Muradnagar
Chhaygram High School	1963	Chhaygram, Burichang
Bakshimul High School	1986	Bakshimul, Burichang
Chandina Pilot High School	1916	Chandina
Chandpur Model Technical High School	1984	Debidwar
NF and BN Amal High School	2001	Paschimgaon, Laksam
Iswar Pathshala High School	1914	Laksam Road, Comilla
Debidwar Reaz Uddin Pilot High School	1918	Debidwar
Debidwar Mofiz Uddin Ahammed Pilot Girls' High School	1972	Debidwar
Gazipur Khan High School and College	1963	Balorampur, Titas
Ghorashal Abdul Karim High School	1932	Ghorashal, Muradnagar
Payerkhola R.M.B.R Girls High School	1962	Jagonnathdhigi, Chauddagram
Dhorkara High School	1969	Cheora, Chauddagram
Bijoykara High School	1970	Jogonnathdhigi, Chauddagram
Sukchail Govt. Junior High School		Jogonnathdhigi, Chauddagram
Gunabati High School	1944	Chauddagram
Gunabati Multilateral High School	1944	Chauddagram
Metonghar B. R. I. M. High School	1994	Metonghar, Muradnagar
Kangshanagar High School	1997	Burichang
Khalilpur High School	1962	Debidwar
Mathabhanga Bhairob High School	1919	Homna
Monohorganj Govt. High School	1971	Monoharganj
Montoli High School and College	1974	Montoli, Nangalkot
Morsheda Begum High School	1972	Kalikapur, Burichang
Rajapur High School	1965	Rajapur, Laksam
Rose Garden International School	1999	Fauzdari Square, Comilla
Sain Uddin Sarker High School	2011	Krishnapur, Muradnagar
Pandughar S.A.B. High School		Pandughar, Muradnagar
School of Military Intelligence	1981	Cumilla Cantonment
Shaila Rani Devi Municipal Girls High School	1946	Comilla
Suagazi T.A. High School and College	1921	Suagazi, Sadar South
Padua Sufia Rahman High School	1966	Padua, Chauddagram
West Bangla School	2016	Kaliyajuri
Bibir Bazar High School	1946	Comilla Adarsha Sadar
Durlovpur Model High School	1967	Adarsha Sadar
Bishnupur High School	1970	Bishnupur, Muradnagar
Jamua High School	1947	Chota Sharifpur, Sadar South
Bhomar Kandi High School	1973	Bhomar kandi, Chandina
Kaduti High School	1966	Kaduti, Chandina
Banskait PJ High School	1924	Banskait, Muradnagar
Pir Kashimpur R. N High School	1970	Pir Kashimpur, Muradnagar
Adda Umedia High School	1945	Adda, Barura
Payab Hazi Abdul Gani High School	1997	Payab, Muradnagar
Ethnica School and College	2003	Court Road, Adarsha Sadar
Comilla Collectorate School & College	2014	Rajbari, Adarsha Sadar
Mainamati English School and College	2020	Cumilla Cantonment
Bakhrabad Gas Adarsha Bidhalaya		Chapapur, Comilla

== Technical colleges ==
Name	Established	Location
Cumilla Polytechnic Institute (CPI)	1962	Kotbari, Adarsha Sadar
Bangladesh Survey Institute	1892	Rammala
CCN Polytechnic Institute	2001	Kotbari, Adarsha Sadar
Comilla Private Polytechnic Institute	2007	Paduar Bazar Highway, Comilla
Landmark Polytechnic Institute	2007	Laksam Road, Comilla
Laksam Modern Polytechnic Institute	2015	Laksam
ABM Golam Mostafa Institute Health & Technology		Debidwar
Abul Bashir Technical College		Housing Estate, Adarsha Sadar
Daulatpur Technical and Commerce College	2004	Daulatpur, Laksam
Afzal Khan Technical and Commerce College	1995	Daulatpur, Adarsha Sadar
Burichang Model Polytechnic Institute	2019	Burichang
Abdul Khaleq Polytechnic Institute	2025	Pir Kashimpur, Muradnagar

== See also ==
- Education in Bangladesh
- List of educational institutions in Barisal
- List of educational institutions in Khulna
- List of educational institutions in Rajshahi
- List of educational institutions in Sylhet
