= Adhyapak Abdul Majid College =

Private college in Chattogram Division, Bangladesh

Coordinates: 23.7176°N 90.8830°E

- অধ্যাপক আবদুল মজিদ কলেজ
- Ramchandrapur, Muradnagar Upazila, Comilla District, Bangladesh

Information
- Other name: AAMC
- School type: Private college
- Founded: 1995
- Founder: Principal Abdul Majid
- Principal: Ferdous Ahmad Chowdhury
- Gender: Co-educational
- Language: Bengali
- EIIN: 106061
- Education Board: Board of Intermediate and Secondary Education, Cumilla

Adhyapak Abdul Majid College is a college located in Ramchandrapur, Muradnagar Upazila, Chattogram Division, Bangladesh.

== History ==
Adhyapak Abdul Majid College was established in 1995 by Professor Abdul Majid.

== See also ==
- List of Educational Institutions in Comilla
