= Comilla District =

District of Bangladesh in Chittagong Division

Comilla District কুমিল্লা জেলা
- District of Bangladesh
- Cumilla District
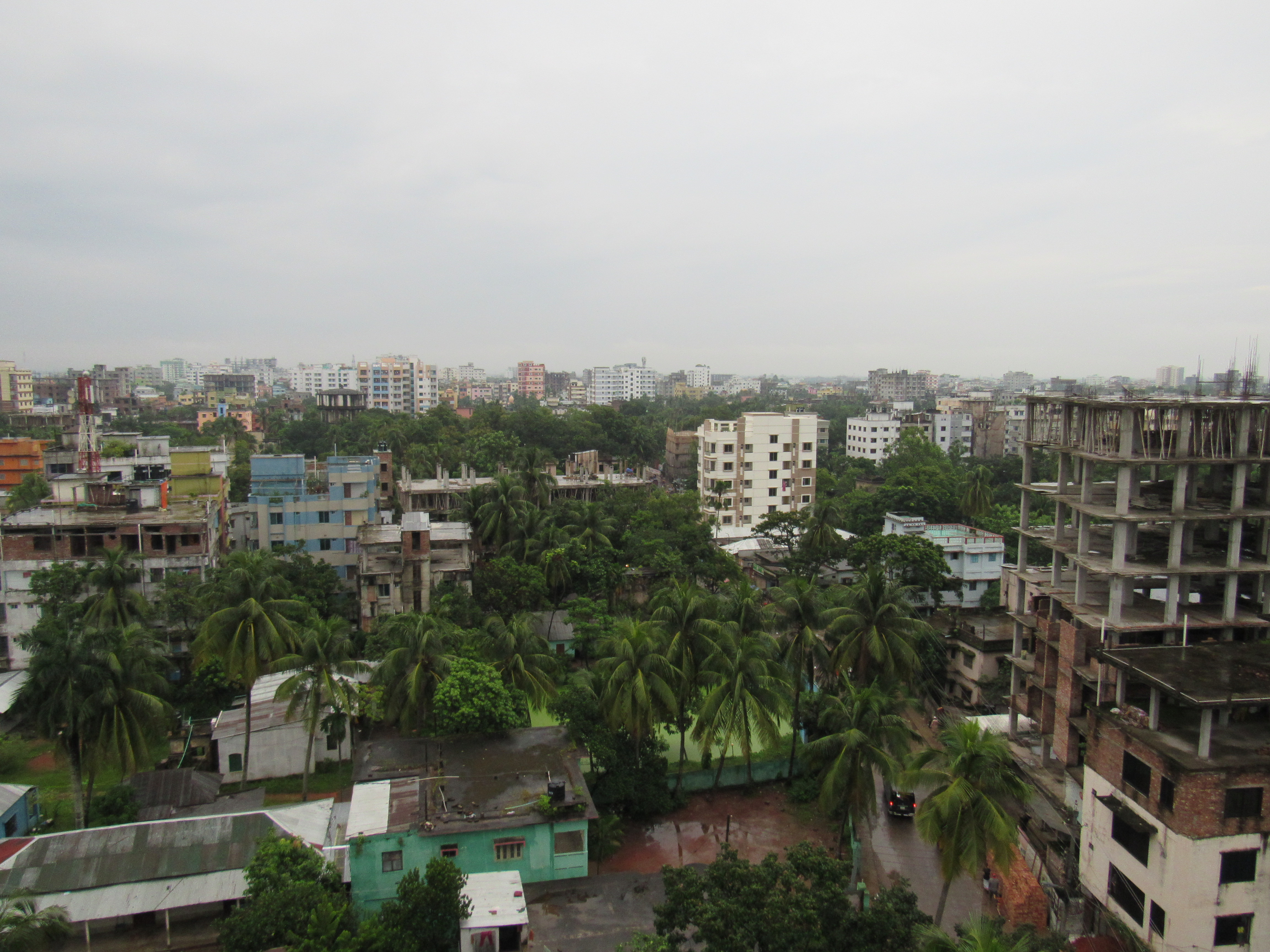
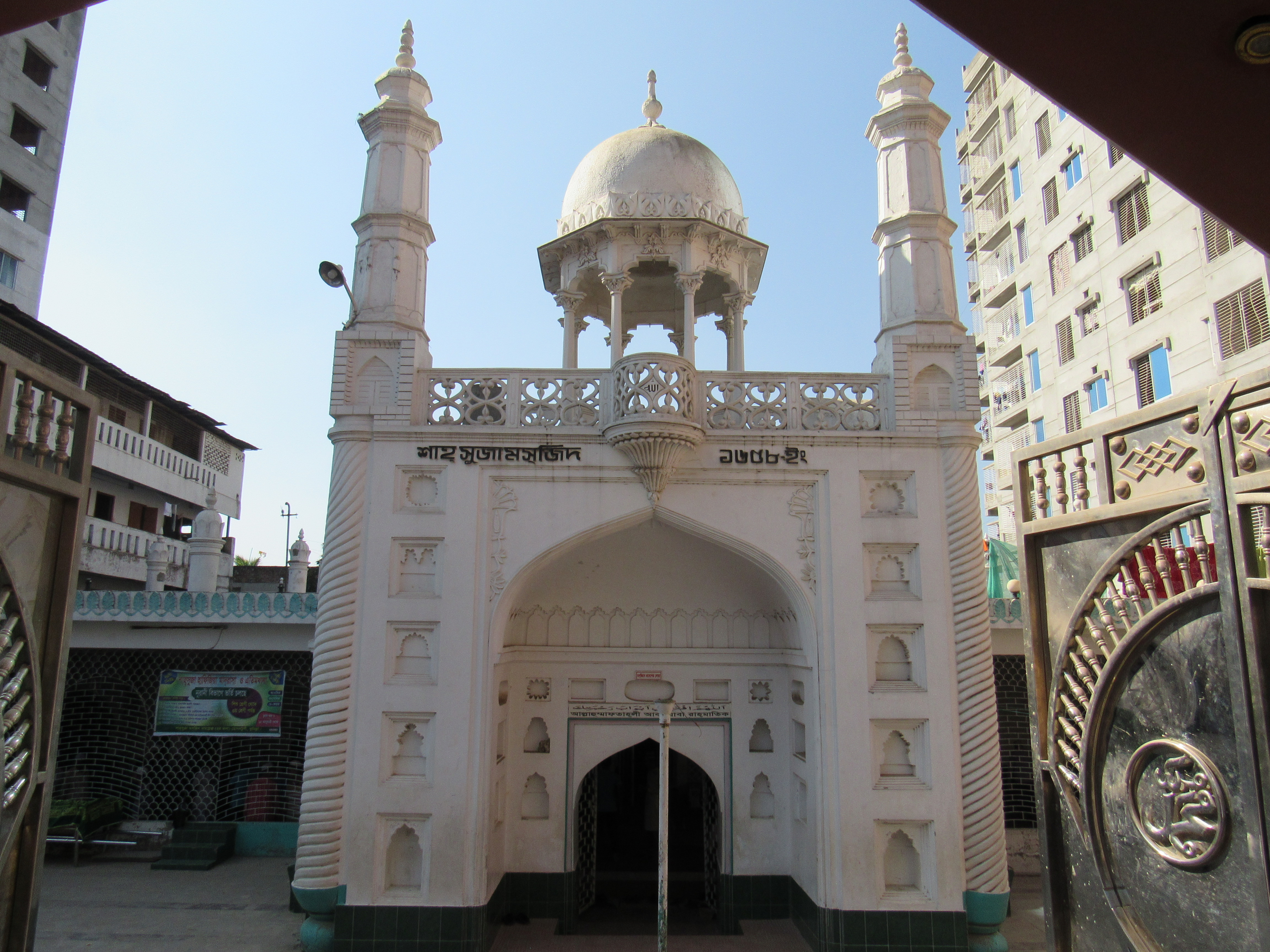
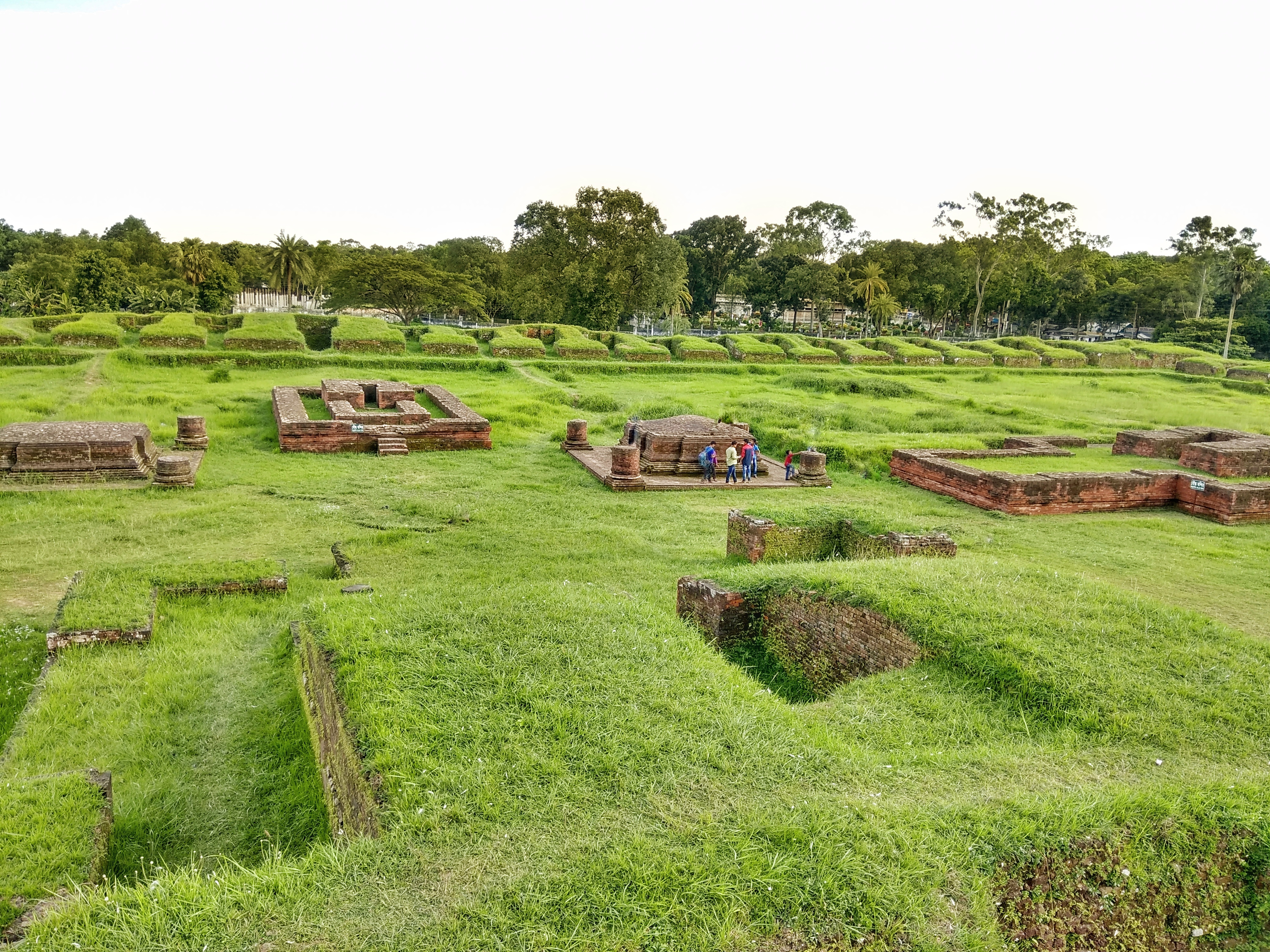
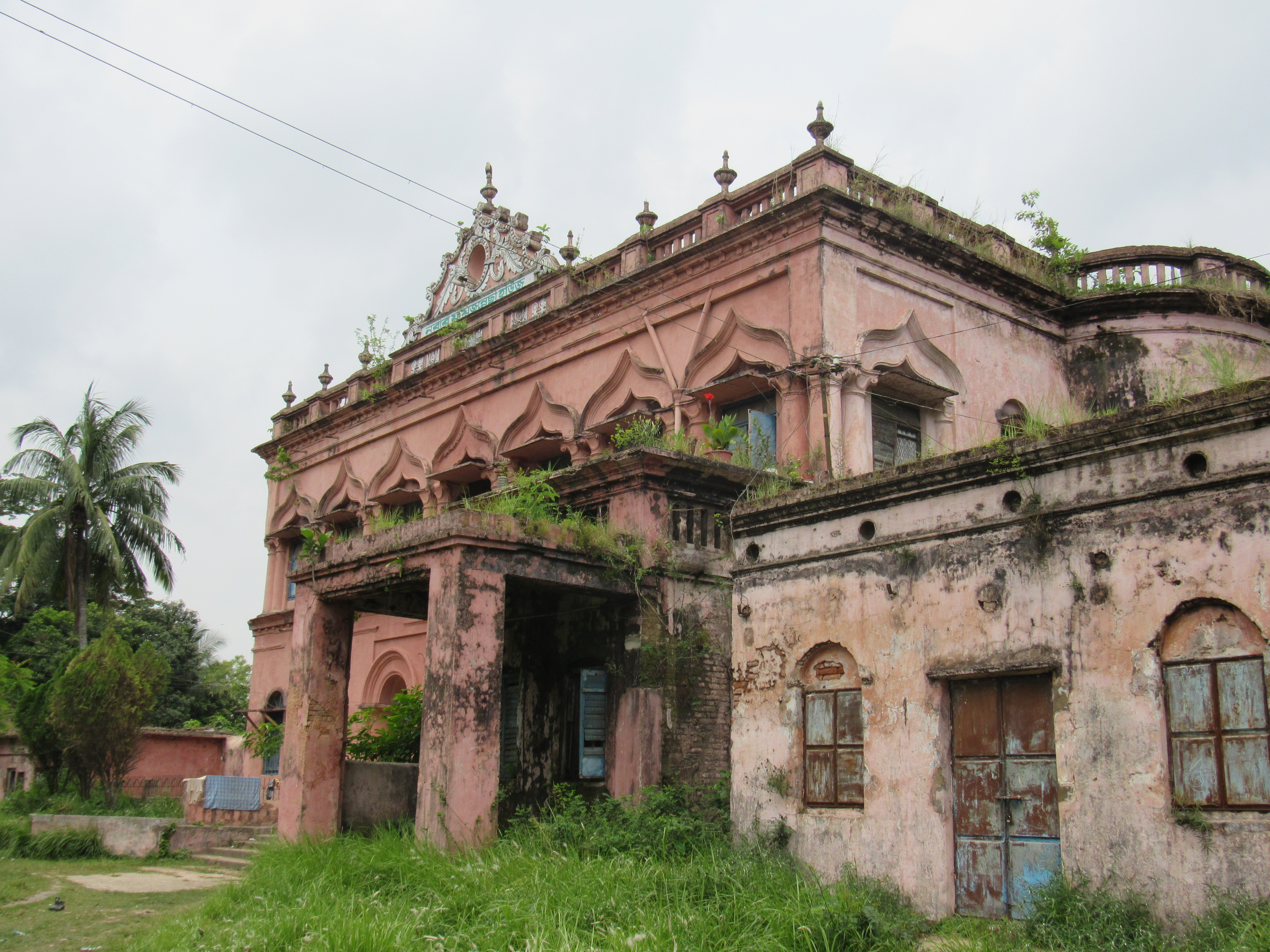
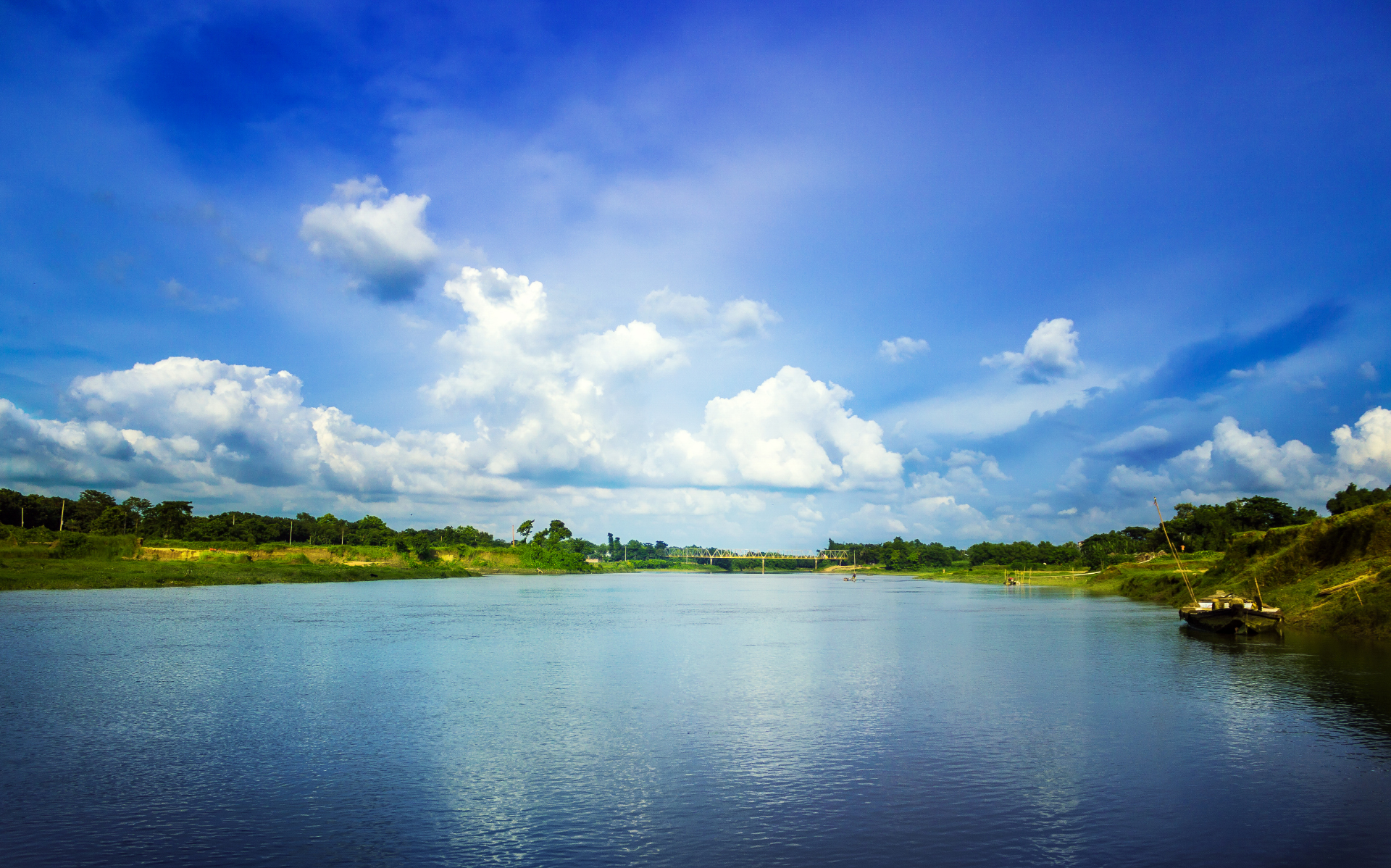
- Clockwise from top-left: Skyline of Comilla, Shah Shuja Mosque, Nawab Faizunnesa House at Laksam, Gomti River, Shalban Vihara in Mainamati

- Location of Comilla within Bangladesh
- Interactive map of Comilla District
- Coordinates: 23.27°N 91.12°E
- Country: Bangladesh
- Division: Chittagong Division
- Capital: Comilla

Government
  - Deputy Commissioner: Md. Kamrul Hasan
  - District Council Chairman: Abu Taher
  - Chief Executive Officer: Md. Helal Uddin

Area
  - Total: 3,146.30 km^{2} (1,214.79 sq mi)

Population (2022)
  - Total: 6,212,216
  - Density: 1,974.45/km^{2} (5,113.81/sq mi)
- Time zone: UTC+06:00 (BST)
- Postal code: 3500
- Area code: 081
- ISO 3166 code: BD-08
- HDI (2018): 0.614 medium · 7th of 21
- Notable sport teams: Comilla Victorians
- Website: www.comilla.gov.bd

Comilla District, officially known as Cumilla District, (Bengali: কুমিল্লা জেলা) is a district located in southeastern Bangladesh. It is a part of the Chittagong Division. It lies about 100 kilometres (60 mi) southeast of Dhaka. Comilla is bordered by Brahmanbaria and Narayanganj districts to the north, Noakhali and Feni districts to the south, Tripura state of India to the east and Munshiganj and Chandpur districts to the west.

== History ==
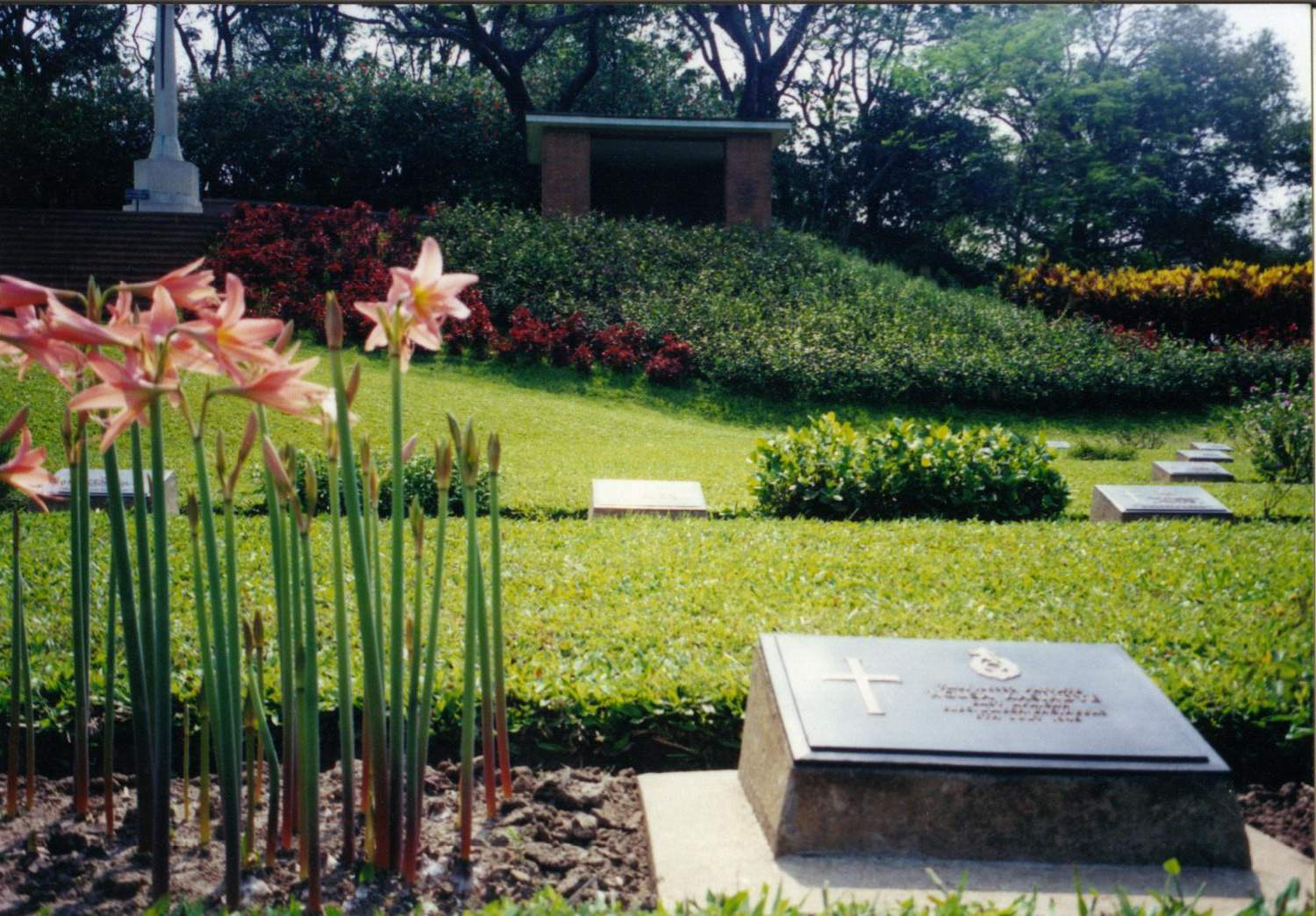
World War II cemetery in Mainamati.

The name Comilla is derived from the Bengali word Komolangko (Bengali: কমলাঙ্ক), the previous ancient name of the region, which means 'lotus pond'. The present Comilla is a district under the Chittagong Division. It was once under the reign of Gangaridai and Samatata in ancient period. As far as is known from the ancient archeology found in the region, Gupta emperors ruled Comilla since the fifth century AD. It was under the control of Gauda Kingdom in 6th century AD after the fall of Gupta rule in Bengal. According to historians, the Buddhist Deva dynasty ruled the region from the seventh to the middle of the eighth century. In the ninth century, Comilla came under the control of the kings of Harikela and Chandra dynasty during the tenth and mid-eleventh century AD. These rulers built the Shalban Vihara in the Mainamati hills, which was a major centre of Buddhist learning. The region became a part of Hindu Sena and Deva dynasty in the 12th and 13th centuries, and was one of the last strongholds of these dynasties after the invasion of the Delhi Sultanate.

Due to its position on the edge of the Bengal Delta, the Comilla region was often contested between the Delhi Sultanate and later Bengal Sultanate and the kings of Tripura whose heartland was in the hills to the east. The arrival of numerous Muslim pirs in the district caused the local Hindu and Buddhist population to largely adopt an Islamic identity In the 15th century the Tripura king Dharma Manikya I built the Dharmasagar tank in Comilla town. After the Mughal conquest of Bengal, the Mughals attacked the Tripura kingdom and conquered most of the present Comilla district, restricting the Tripura kings to the hills. The region became known as Chakla Roshanabad and was part of the Sarkar of Sonargaon of the Bengal Subah, although the Tripura kings still had Zamindari rights over much of the land. In the 18th century, the Comilla region saw the uprising of Shamsher Gazi from the current Feni district, who briefly ruled over the kingdom of Tripura and nearby lands until his execution in 1760 by the Nawabs of Bengal.

In 1765, as part of their obtaining the Diwani of Bengal, the East India Company took Comilla. In order to facilitate revenue collection, the company hired a district collector in the province in 1769. Comilla then belonged to the province of Dhaka. Comilla was made under the office of the district collector in 1776. The Tripura Collector's journey began with the formation of Tippera or Tipperah district of Bengal by the British in 1790. According to the Third Regulation in 1793, a civil judge was appointed for the Tripura district and in that year he was given magisterial powers. In 1837, the posts of magistrates and collectors were separated. In 1859, these two posts were merged again.

In the 19th century the reforming influence of Maulana Keramat Ali largely caused the Muslims of the district to abandon all folk religious practices including the worship of minor deities and pirs. In the early 20th century the Tippera Krishak Samiti helped organise the peasants of the district and won most of the seats in the district in the 1937 elections. In the 1940s, the mostly Muslim populace supported the Pakistan movement, and southern parts of the district were heavily affected by the Noakhali riots which led to a steady exodus of Hindus to India, especially neighbouring Tripura state. The district was made part of East Pakistan in 1947.

After the partition in 1947, the district was renamed Comilla in 1960 and the post of district magistrate and collector was named deputy commissioner. In 1971, 900 Bengali Muslim officers and men of the East Pakistan Army were massacred in Comilla Cantonment. After a long guerilla struggle, Bangladeshi forces took Comilla from Pakistan on 8 December 1971, and Comilla became part of Bangladesh. Chandpur and Brahmanbaria sub-divisions of this district became districts in 1984.

== Geography and climate ==
Comilla has a total area of 3146.30.17 square kilometres. It is bounded by Brahmanbaria district and Narayanganj district of Chittagong division to the north, Munshiganj district of Dhaka division and Chandpur district to the west, Noakhali and Feni districts to the south and the Indian state of Tripura to the east. The district headquarters of Comilla is located close to the Indian border, with the town of Sonamura on the other side. Major rivers passing through Comilla include the Gumti and the Little Feni, and the Meghna on the far northwest. It is hot in summer and cold in winter.

The district is primarily composed of plain land. Most of the district is situated on a bed of old elevated alluvial deposits called Chandina alluvium, while the northwestern part of the district is more recent alluvium deposited by the Meghna, while the far east consists of harder valley alluvium. The Lalmai Hills running parallel to the Tripura hills lie in the east of the district.

== Administration ==
The administrative headquarters of Comilla are located in the city of Comilla which has a total area of 11.47 square kilometres. It consists of 18 mouzas and 3 wards. Comilla thana was officially converted into an upazila in 1983 which contains one municipality, 18 wards, 19 union parishads, 452 mouzas, and 458 villages.

Deputy Commissioner (DC): Md Jahangir Alam

=== Upazilas ===
Comilla District upazila geocode map

Comilla district consists of the following Upazilas:

- Bangra Upazila
- Barura Upazila
- Brahmanpara Upazila
- Burichong Upazila
- Comilla Sadar Upazila
- Comilla Sadar Dakshin Upazila
- Chandina Upazila
- Chauddagram Upazila
- Daudkandi Upazila
- Debidwar Upazila
- Homna Upazila
- Laksam Upazila
- Lalmai Upazila
- Monohorgonj Upazila
- Meghna Upazila
- Muradnagar Upazila
- Nangalkot Upazila
- Titas Upazila

== Demographics ==
Historical population
Year	Pop.	±% p.a.
1974	2,802,944	—
1981	3,355,953	+2.61%
1991	4,032,666	+1.85%
2001	4,595,557	+1.32%
2011	5,387,288	+1.60%
2022	6,212,216	+1.30%

According to the 2022 Census of Bangladesh, Comilla District had 1,407,368 households and a population of 6,212,216 with an average 4.33 people per household. Among the population, 1,356,351 (21.83%) inhabitants were under 10 years of age. The population density was 1,974 people per km^{2}. Comilla District had a literacy rate (age 7 and over) of 76.68%, compared to the national average of 74.80%, and a sex ratio of 1142 females per 1000 males. Approximately, 20.43% of the population lived in urban areas. The ethnic population was 2,044.

Religions in Comilla District (2022)
Religion	Percent
Islam	95.56%
Hinduism	4.33%
Other or not stated	0.11%

Religion in present-day Comilla District
Religion	1941 (Note: 1941 figures are for the Sadar subdivision of erstwhile Tippera district, which roughly corresponds to the present district)		1981		1991		2001		2011		2022	
Religion	Pop.	%	Pop.	%	Pop.	%	Pop.	%	Pop.	%	Pop.	%
Islam	1,407,494	80.41%	3,119,300	92.95%	3,784,774	93.85%	4,348,227	94.62%	5,123,410	95.10%	5,936,391	95.56%
Hinduism	340,010	19.43%	230,947	6.88%	237,818	5.90%	241,742	5.26%	258,105	4.79%	269,214	4.33%
Others (Note: Including Jainism, Christianity, Buddhism, Zoroastrianism, Judaism, Ad-Dharmis, or not stated)	2,804	0.16%	5,706	0.17%	10,074	0.25%	5,588	0.12%	5,773	0.11%	6,611	0.11%
Total Population	1,750,308	100%	3,355,953	100%	4,032,666	100%	4,595,557	100%	5,387,288	100%	6,212,216	100%

Muslims make up 95.56% of the population, while Hindus are 4.33% of the total population. Formerly a centre of Buddhism, there are now 5,801 Buddhists in the district, concentrated in Lalmai and Laksam upazilas.

== Economy ==
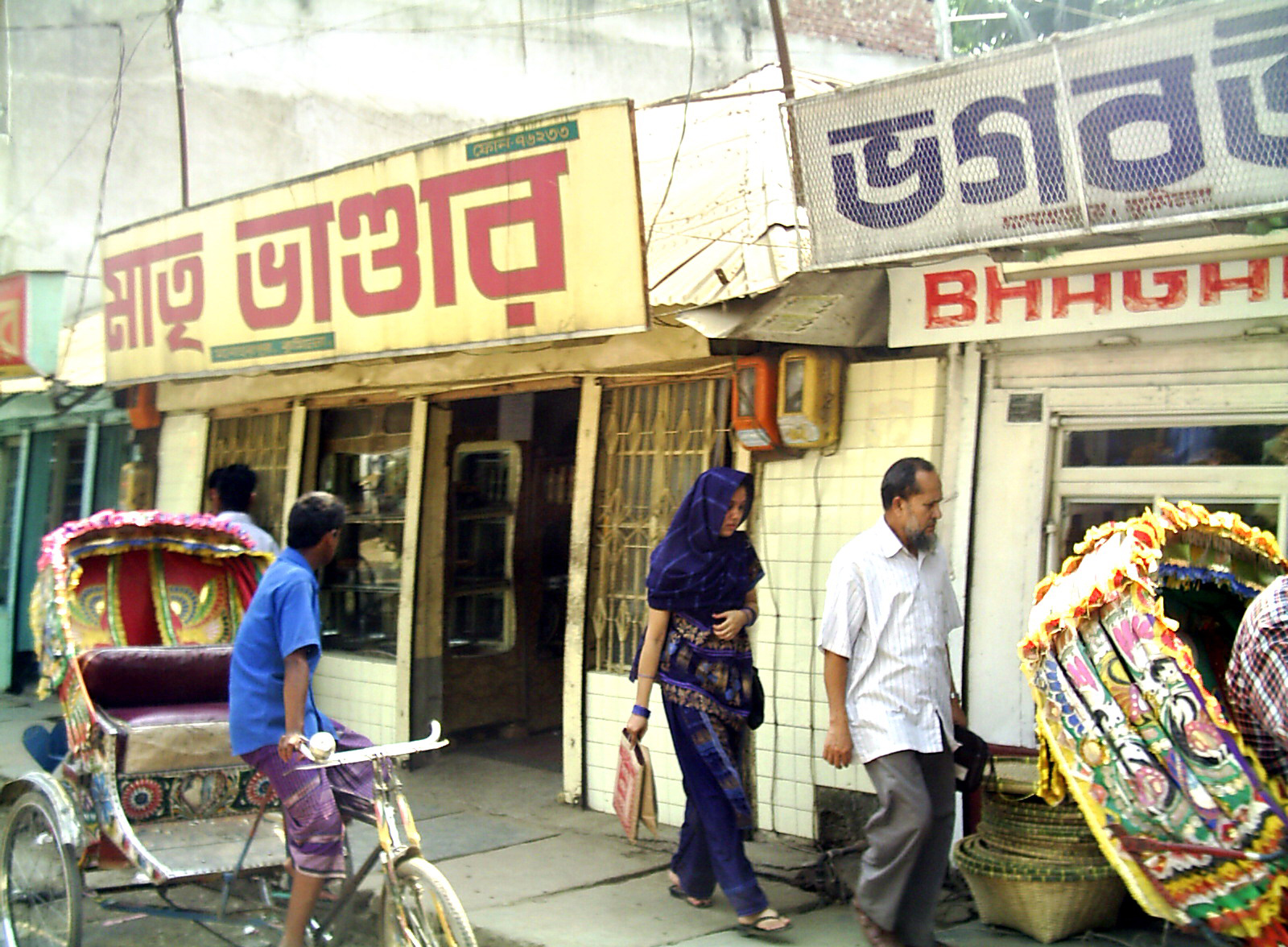
Manufacturers of popular Comilla sweetmeats are mostly based on this Manoharpur area of the main town.

Mainly based on agriculture, the economy of Comilla has flourished through trade and cottage industries, especially the 'Khadi' textile. For the economic development of the region the "Bangladesh Export Processing Zone Authority" has established the "Comilla Export Processing Zone" spread over an area of 104.44 hectares (258.1 acres) in the Comilla Airport area in 2000. The export zone employs 20 thousand people as of 2013.

== Places of interest ==
Landmarks include Kotbari, a cantonment, or military installation and Kandirpar, considered the heart of the Comilla district. Ancient Buddhist monastery ruins are the major attraction of Mainamati, near Kotbari. There is an ancient Hindu Temple named Comilla Jagannath Temple located on East Bibirbazar Road. There is also the recently constructed Allah Chattar, a tower in Muradnagar.

A Second World War cemetery, Mainamati War Cemetery, lies about 3.1 kilometres (1.9 mi) away from Comilla Cantonment, which was a frontier military base in the fight against the Japanese who had occupied Burma. British Army soldiers killed during the fight with the Japanese Army at the Burma (Myanmar) frontier were buried here. Pashchimgaon Nawab Bari, the place of only lady Jaminder Nawab Faizunnesa, a poet, educationist and a philanthropist.

Kazi Nazrul Islam, the national poet of Bangladesh, passed a significant time of his life in this town. Both his wives, Promila Devi and Nargis, hailed from this district.

Comilla Victoria College and Comilla Zilla School are here, the latter since 1837. Bangladesh Academy for Rural Development (BARD) is situated in Kotbari. The area saw the development of Comilla Model.

== Education ==
- Comilla University
- Comilla Medical College
- Comilla Victoria Government College
- Comilla Government Women's College
- Eastern Medical College
- Bangladesh Army International University of Science & Technology
- Comilla Government College
- Central Medical College
- Mainamati Medical College
- Comilla Cadet College
- Comilla Zilla School
- Army Medical College Cumilla
- Ispahani Cantonment Public School and College
- Mainamati English School and College
- Comilla Cantonment Board Boys' High School
- Comilla Cantonment Board Girls' High School
- Comilla Cantonment Madhyamik Bidyalay
- Comilla Cantonment College
- Chandina Pilot High School
- Nawab Faizunnesa Government College
- Laksam Pilot High School
- Cumilla Modern School
- Our Lady of Fatima Girls' High School
- Bangladesh Survey Institute

== Notable people ==
The following people were either born or stayed in this district for a significant span of their lifetime:

- Khondaker Mostaq Ahmad, 5th President of Bangladesh (15 August 1975 to 3 November 1975).
- Ferdous Ahmed, film actor
- Kazi Zafar Ahmed, politician
- Kamrul Ahsan : secretary to the government and now serving as Bangladesh Ambassador to Russia. Earlier served as High Commissioner to Canada and Singapore
- Buddhadeb Basu (1908–1974), Indian poet, novelist, essayist, translator and editor
- General Iqbal Karim Bhuiyan, former chief of Army Staff
- Sachin Dev Burman (1906–1975) singer, composer and music director
- Sabitri Chatterjee, actress in Indian Bengali film, TV serial and theatre
- Nawab Faizunnesa Choudhurani (1834–1903), poet and philanthropist
- Asif Akbar, singer
- Alaka Das, artist of classical music, principal of Sangeet Shikhharthee Sammilan (সঙ্গীত শিক্ষার্থী সম্মেলন) Talpukur Par, Comilla
- Shib Narayan Das, Artist of the map of Bangladesh on the first national flag of Bangladesh in 1971, political activist
- Sudhin Das, Swaralipikar of Nazrul Sangeet, awarded by Ekushe Padak
- Dhirendranath Datta (1886–1971), political leader, provincial minister of the than East Pakistan, Language Movement activist and lawyer
- Muhammad Hasanuzzaman (1900–1968), politician and educationist
- Monirul Haq Chowdhury renowned politician and a former member of parliament for Comilla-9, sector commander during Bangladesh War of Independence, born and raised in Comilla
- Akbar Hossain BP, former minister of Bangladesh government
- Abdul Gani (1919 – 1957), was a Bengali military officer. He was the founder and the first in-charge of one of the pioneer companies of 1st East Bengal Regiment
- Sagarmoy Ghosh, Indian editor and author
- Atiqul Islam, Mayor of Dhaka North City Corporation
- Md Mainul Islam, former chief of Border Guards Bangladesh
- Md. Tafazzul Islam - 17th Chief Justice of Bangladesh
- AKM Bazlul Karim, theater personality
- Akhtar Hameed Khan (1914–1999): social reformer and development activist. He is from U.P -undivided India, but spent an important part of his life as asst magistrate (ICS) and thereafter as principal Victoria College and creator of co-operative programme and BARD at Comilla
- Abul Manzoor, sector commander during Bangladesh War of Independence and decorated with the award Bir Uttom, was born in Comilla
- Asif Mahmud Shojib Bhuiyan, Bangladeshi student activist, coordinator of the Anti-discrimination Students Movement, former president of Dhaka University unit of Bangladesh Sadharon Chhatra Odhikar Songrokkhon Parishad
- Hasnat Abdullah, member of parliament for Cumilla-4, Bangladeshi student activist, coordinator of the Anti-discrimination Students Movement
- Asif Nazrul, Bangladeshi writer, novelist, columnist, political commentator, professor of law at the University of Dhaka, interim government adviser handling Ministry of Law, Justice and Parliamentary Affairs, Ministry of Expatriates' Welfare and Overseas Employment and Ministry of Cultural Affairs
- Abdullah Al Mamun, Quran reciter
- Abdul Quddus, Islamic scholar
- Hifzur Rahman, Islamic scholar
- Khondkar Nasim Ahmed, footballer
- Sirajuddin, footballer
- Rashid Ahmed, footballer

== See also ==
- List of educational institutions in Comilla
