= Central Medical College =

Private medical college located in Cumilla, Bangladesh

- সেন্ট্রাল মেডিকেল কলেজ
- Other names: CeMeC
- Type: Private medical college
- Established: 2005
- Academic affiliations: University of Chittagong, Ministry of Health and Family Welfare (Bangladesh), Bangladesh Medical and Dental Council
- Chairman: Syed Abdullah Muhammad Taher
- Principal: Shofiqur Rahman Patwary
- Location: Paduar Bazar, Bishaw Road, Cumilla, Bangladesh; 23.4119°N 91.1844°E
- Campus: Rural
- Language: English
- Website: www.cemec.edu.bd

Central Medical College (CeMeC) (Bengali: সেন্ট্রাল মেডিকেল কলেজ) is a private medical school in Bangladesh, established in 2005. The campus of the college is located beside the Dhaka–Chittagong Highway at Paduar Bazar, Bishaw Road in Cumilla Sadar Dakshin Upazila, in the Cumilla District of Chittagong Division. It is affiliated with University of Chittagong, Ministry of Health and Family Welfare (Bangladesh) and Bangladesh Medical and Dental Council.

It offers a five-year course of study leading to a Bachelor of Medicine, Bachelor of Surgery (MBBS) degree. A one-year or two-year internship after graduation is compulsory for all graduates. The degree is recognised by the Bangladesh Medical and Dental Council.

== History ==
Syed Abdullah Muhammad Taher established central medical college in 2005.

== Campus ==
The main campus is located beside the Dhaka–Chittagong Highway at Paduar Bazar, Bishaw Road in Comilla Sadar Dakshin Upazila, in the Comilla District of Chittagong Division.

== Organization and administration ==
It is affiliated with University of Chittagong and Chittagong Medical University as a constituent medical college. The college is approved by Ministry of Health and Family Welfare (Bangladesh) and the MBBS course is approved by the Bangladesh Medical and Dental Council. At present the chairman of the college is Dr. Syed Abdullah Muhammad Taher and The principal is Dr. Shofiqur Rahman Patwary.

== Academics ==
The college offers a five-year course of study, approved by the Bangladesh Medical and Dental Council (BMDC), leading to a Bachelor of Medicine, Bachelor of Surgery (MBBS) degree from Chittagong Medical University. After passing the final professional examination, there is a compulsory one-year internship. The internship is a prerequisite for obtaining registration from the BMDC to practice medicine.

== See also ==
- List of medical colleges in Bangladesh
- List of Educational Institutions in Comilla
