= Britannia University =

Private university in Comilla, Bangladesh

- ব্রিটানিয়া ইউনিভার্সিটি
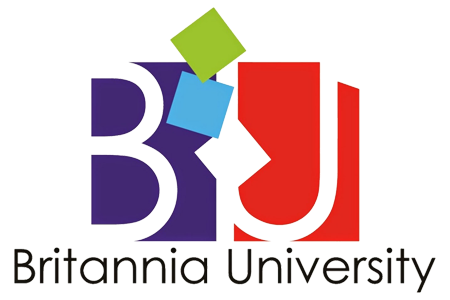
- Other name: BU
- Motto: Learning, Creativity and Leadership
- Type: Private
- Established: 2012; 14 years ago
- Affiliations: University Grants Commission (UGC)
- Chairman: Syed Ehsanul Haque
- Chancellor: President Hafiz Uddin Ahmad
- Vice-Chancellor: Prof. Dr. Surajit Sarbabidya
- Academic staff: 165
- Students: 2600
- Location: Paduar Bazar, Bishwa Road., Comilla, Comilla District, 3500, Bangladesh; 23.4199°N 91.1719°E
- Website: britannia.edu.bd

Britannia University (BU) (Bengali: ব্রিটানিয়া বিশ্ববিদ্যালয়) is a private university established in 2012 under the 2012 Private University Act. The university is located at Paduar Bazar, Bishwa Road, Comilla, Bangladesh.

== History ==
Approval from the Ministry of Education on 14 March, 2012 & from the University Grants Commission (UGC) on 20 March, 2012.

== Campus ==
Until permanent facilities are constructed, Britannia University's temporary campus is at Paduar Bazar, Bishwa Road, Comilla.

== Faculty ==
=== Faculty of Engineering ===
  - BSc. in Computer science and engineering (CSE)
  - BSc. in CSE (For Diploma Engineers)
  - M.Sc. in Computer Science and Engineering

=== School of Business ===
  - Bachelor of Business Administration (BBA)
  - Master of Business Administration (MBA)
  - Executive Master of Business Administration (EMBA)

=== Department of English ===
  - BA Hon's. in English
  - MA in English (1 Year)
  - MA in English (2 Years)

=== School of Law ===
  - LLB Hon's.
  - LLM(1 Year)
  - LL.M (2 Years)

=== Department of Economics ===
  - BSS Hon's. in Economics
  - MSS in Applied Sociology
  - MSS in Economics

== See also ==
- List of Educational Institutions in Comilla
