= Santi Ghose =

Indian politician

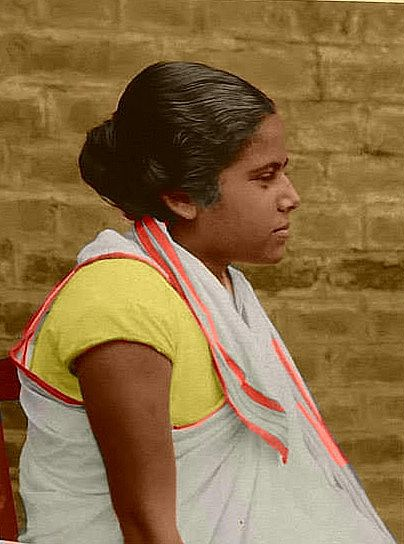
- Sri Shanti Ghosh
- Born: 22 November 1916; Cumilla, Bengal Presidency, British India
- Died: 1989 (aged 72–73)
- Education: Nawab Faizunnesa Government Girls' High School, Comilla Government Women's College
- Known for: Assassinating a British magistrate at age 15

Santi Ghose (also known as Santi Ghosh; 22 November 1916 – 1989) was an Indian nationalist who, along with Suniti Choudhury, assassinated a British district magistrate when she was 16 years old and is known for her participation in an armed revolutionary struggle.

== Early life ==
Ghose was born on 22 November 1916 in Cumilla, British India (Now Bangladesh). She belongs to Bangal and was the daughter of Debendranath Ghose, a nationalist and a professor of philosophy at Victoria College of Comilla in eastern Bengal.

In 1931, Ghose was a founding member of the Chhatri Sangha (Girl Students Association) and served as its secretary. Ghose was inspired by Profullanandini Brahma, a student at Nawab Faizunnesa Government Girls' High School Comilla, and joined the Jugantar Party, a militant revolutionary organization which "used murder as a political technique to dislodge British colonial rule." She trained in self-defense with swords, clubs, and firearms.

== Assassination of Charles Stevens ==
On 14 December 1931, Ghose and Suniti Chowdhury the former 16 and Suniti 14 at that time, walked into the office of Charles Geoffrey Buckland Stevens, a British bureaucrat and the district magistrate of Comilla, under the pretense that they wanted to present candies and chocolates to the magistrate prior to Christmas as he would be gone to Britain during the same. While Stevens ate the candy and said "These are delicious!", Ghose and Chowdhury removed automatic pistols which were hidden under their shawls and said "Well how about this one Mr. Magistrate?" and shot and killed him.

=== Trial and sentence ===
The girls were taken into custody and imprisoned in the local British jail. In February 1932, Ghose and Chowdhury appeared in court in Kolkata (formerly called Calcutta), and were sentenced to transportation for life (lifelong banishment). In an interview, they stated, "It is better to die than live in a horse's stable." Ghose said that she was disappointed that she had not been sentenced to hanging and would thus not be able to achieve martyrdom.

Ghose was subjected to humiliation and physical abuse in prison and was treated as a "second-class prisoner." In 1939, after having served seven years of her sentence, she was released because of the amnesty negotiations between Gandhi and the British colonial authorities.

=== Public and media response ===
Contemporary Western periodicals portrayed the assassination as a sign of "Indians' outrage against an ordinance by the Earl of Willingdon that suppressed the civil rights of Indians, including that of free speech." Indian sources characterized the assassination as Ghose and Chowdbury's response to the "misbehaviors of the British district magistrates" who, secure in their positions of power, had sometimes molested Indian women.

After the verdict was announced, a flyer was found by the intelligence branch of police in the Rajshahi district praising Ghose and Chowdbury as nationalist heroines. The poster read, "THOU ART FREEDOM'S NOW, AND FAME'S" and displayed photographs of the two girls alongside lines from Robert Burns' poem Scots Wha Hae:

"Tyrants fall in every foe!
Liberty's in every blow!"

== Later life and death ==
After her release, Ghose attended the Bengali Women's College and participated in India's Communist movement. She later joined the Indian National Congress. In 1942, Ghose married Professor Chittaranjan Das. She served on the West Bengal Legislative Council from 1952–62 and 1967–68. She also served on the West Bengal Legislative Assembly from 1962–64. Ghose wrote and published a book entitled Arun Bahni.

Ghose died in 1989.
