= Army Medical College Cumilla =

Bangladesh Army controlled private medical college

- Other names: AMCCu
- Established: 2014
- Chairman: Major General Md Nazim-ud-Daula SPP, ndc, psc, PhD
- Principal: Brig Gen Imranul Hasan Murad, BGBMS, FCPS, DDV
- Location: Cumilla Cantonment, Mainamoti, Comilla; 23.4856°N 91.1129°E
- Website: www.amccomilla.edu.bd

Army Medical College Cumilla (AMCCu) is a medical school in Comilla District, Bangladesh.

== History ==
Army Medical College Comilla was established in Comilla Cantonment by a sanction letter from the Ministry of Health. Total five Army Medical Colleges were inaugurated by the Prime Minister of Bangladesh through on 10 January in 2015 and this college started its academic journey on 11 January in 2015 with 50 students.

Army Medical College Comilla is affiliated to Bangladesh University of Professionals (BUP). The aim of Army Medical College Comilla is to train specially selected candidates to be called Army Medical College Comilla cadets for five academic years according to the syllabus laid down by Bangladesh Medical and Dental Council (BMDC) for MBBS degree to be awarded by the BUP.

== See also ==
- List of educational institutions in Comilla District
