= Ibn Taimiya School and College =

Private School and College in Cumilla, Bangladesh

- ইবনে তাইমিয়া স্কুল এন্ড কলেজ, কুমিল্লা

Location
- EPZ Road, Tomsom bridge Comilla; Bangladesh; 23.4494°N 91.1811°E

Information
- Type: Private School and College
- Established: 1979
- School number: 105751
- Principal: Md. Shafiqul Alam Helal
- Campus type: Urban
- Website: itsc.edu.bd

Ibn Taimiya School and College is a kindergarten through twelfth grade school in the Tomsom Bridge area of Comilla, Bangladesh. It was established in 1979. Several times in recent years, it has placed among the top ten schools in the region in terms of student performance.

== History ==
Ibn Taimiya began in 1979 as a kindergarten. Later it was expanded to cover secondary education through grade 10, and in 1996 a college section (grades 11–12) was added. The main building which is still in use today was built during 2012.

Students take their Secondary School Certificate (SSC) and Higher Secondary (School) Certificate (HSC) examinations under the Board of Intermediate and Secondary Education, Comilla. Ibn Taimiya School and College placed among the top ten schools under this board in terms of SSC results in 2013, 2014, 2015, 2018, 2019 and 2020.

== See also ==
- Education in Bangladesh
- List of universities and schools in Comilla
- List of Educational Institutions in Comilla
- National Academy for Educational Management
- Minister of Education (Bangladesh)
- Ibn Taymiyya
