= Comilla Modern High School =

- কুমিল্লা মডার্ণ হাই স্কুল

Location
- Nazrul Avenue Road, West Kandirpar, Comilla, 3500; Bangladesh; 23.459750°N 91.176181°E

Information
- Motto: প্রভু জ্ঞান দাও (God give us knowledge)
- Established: 1993
- Founder: Afzal Khan
- School board: Comilla Education Board
- Staff: 20
- Teaching staff: 145+
- Grades: 6-10
- Age range: 11–18
- Enrollment: 7000
- Language: Bengali
- Campus: Nazrul Avenue Road
- Campus type: Urban
- Colors: Navy Blue and White
- Sports: Football, cricket, basketball, volleyball, badminton,
- Website: comillamodernhighschool.edu.bd

Comilla Modern High School (Bengali: কুমিল্লা মডার্ণ হাই স্কুল) is a combined school in Comilla, a city in Bangladesh. It was established in 1993. It is situated in Nazrul Avenue Road. The Education Institute Identification Number (EIIN) of the school is 105767.

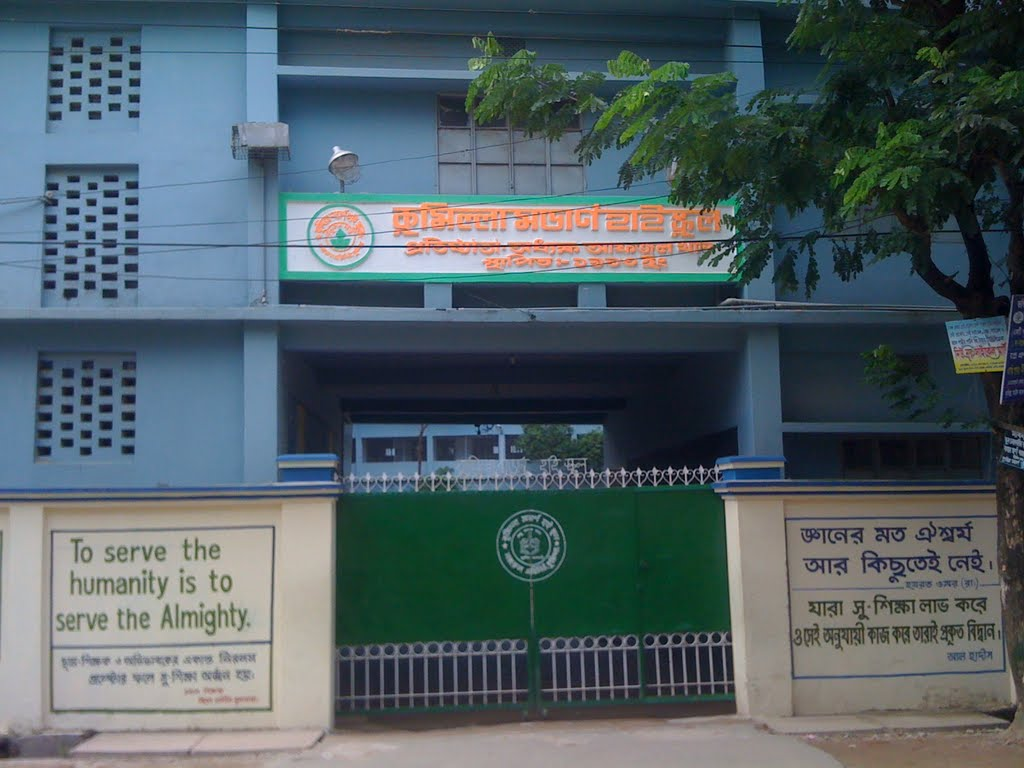
Front gate

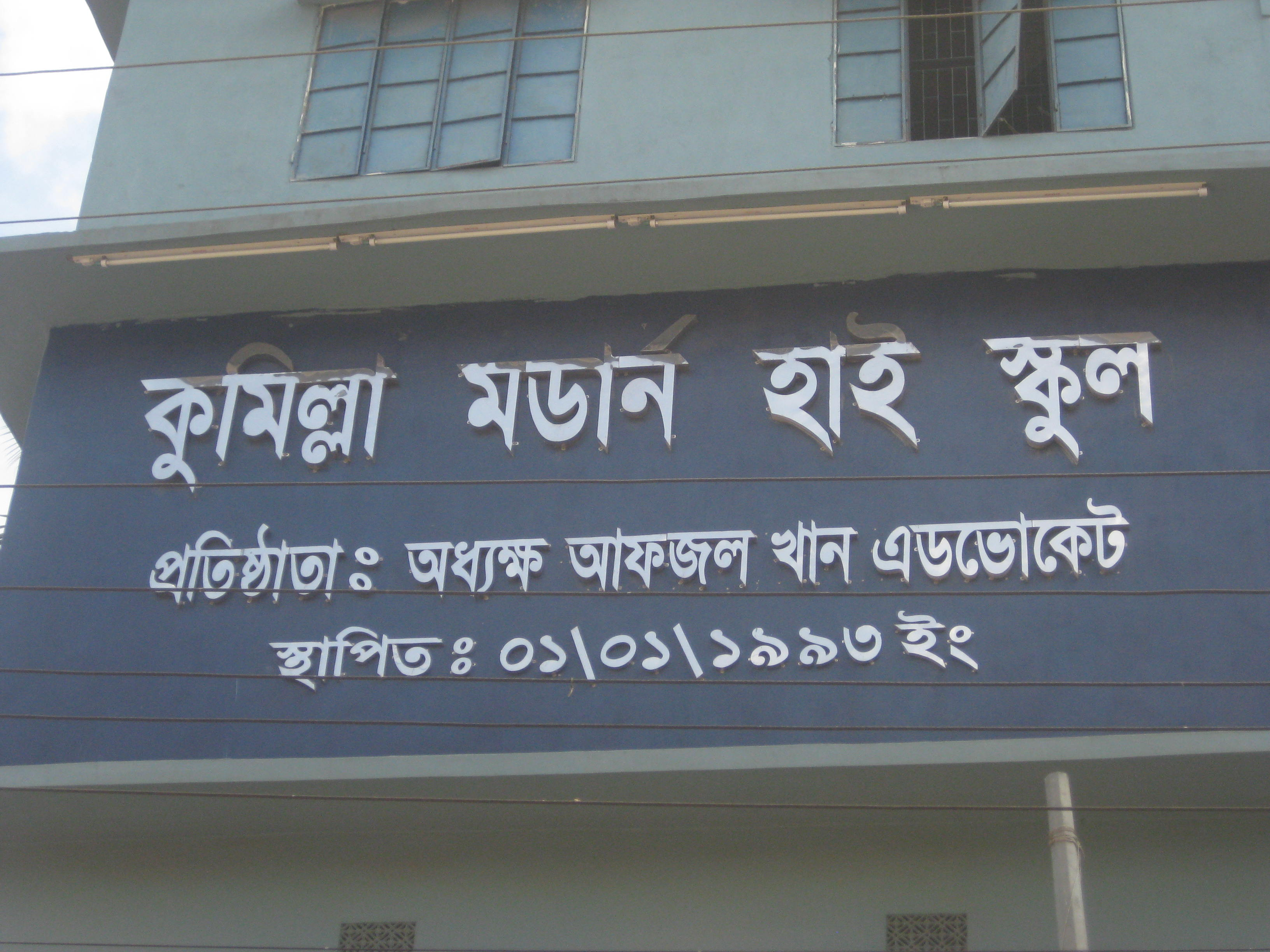
New Decorative Heading of Comilla Modern High School, June 2013

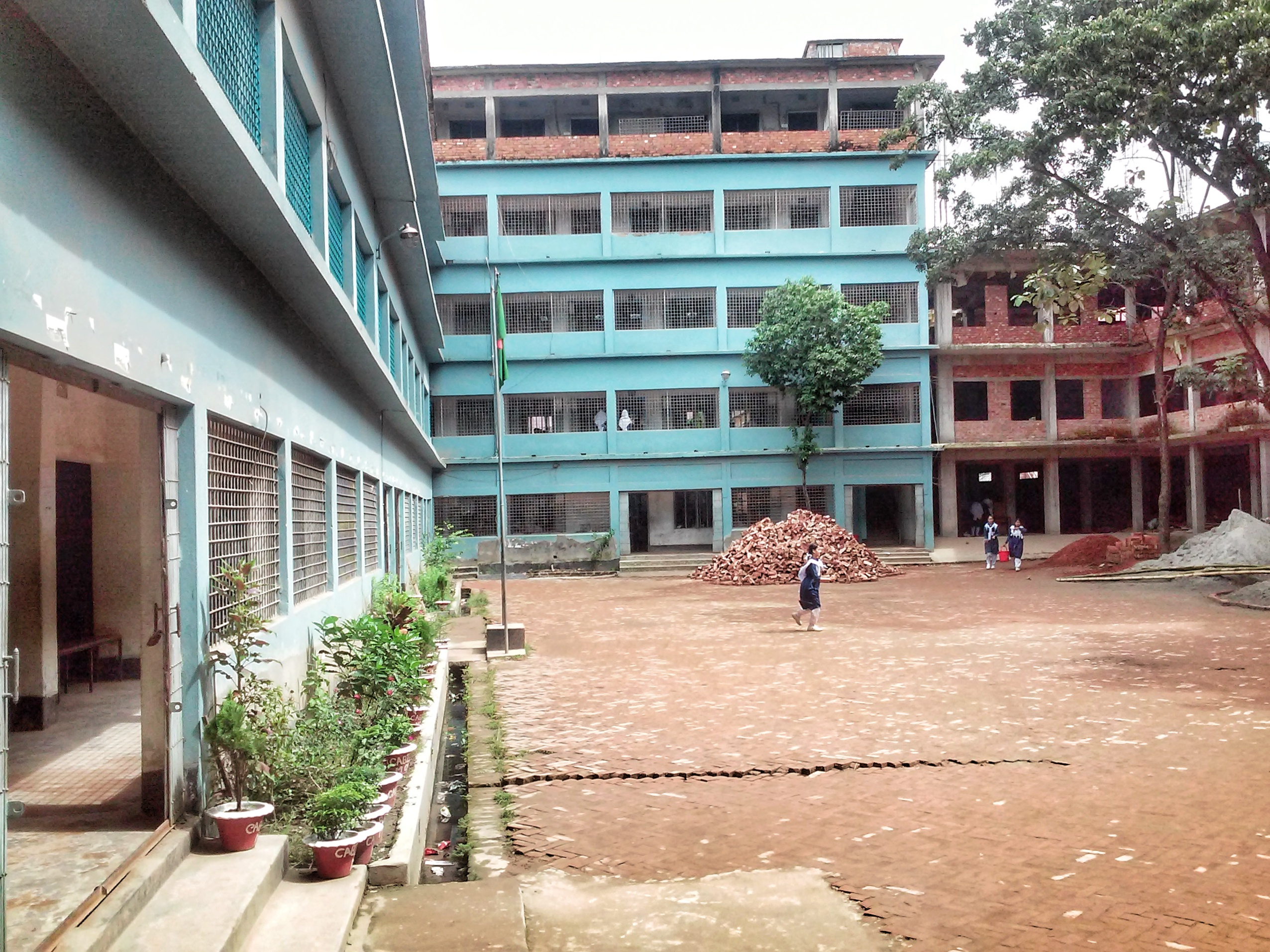
Internal view

== History ==
The school, in the centre of Comilla, was established in 1992. The school was established in 155 satak area. The official study session was started in 1993.

Initially the school conducted only one shift. From 1997 two shifts were introduced: morning and day. Presently morning shift is for girls' and day shift is for boys'. Each shift is headed by an assistant head master. 7,123 students are studying in the school with 156 teachers. The number of teachers in morning shift are 76 and in day shift are 80. Morning shift starts in 7:00 am up to 12:00 pm then day shift continues in 12.30 pm up to 5.30 pm.

Adv. Afzal Khan is the founder of the school. He is also founder of Afzal Khan Jalua Para Girls High School and 15 others school, College and Mosque.

== Facilities ==
The school has two academic buildings, an administrative building. There is a field in the school arena. Other facilities include workshop, auditorium, canteen, and library. The school has five laboratories.

The uniform is for boys; a white shirt with navy blue full pants and white shoes and for girls; navy blue kameez with white shalwar and white shoes. The school monogram is printed on the shirt pocket.

Usually students are admitted in class 6. Admission can be considered in other classes if a vacancy is available or if someone is transferred from some other government school. The admission test is usually taken in the last week of December.

== Academic performance ==
The JSC and SSC examinations are conducted by the Board of Secondary and Intermediate Education under the Ministry of Education. Junior School Certificate (JSC) is a public examination taken by students in Bangladesh after successful completion of eight years of schooling and Secondary School Certificate (SSC) is the diploma awarded for the completion of grade ten, which is equivalent to the O Levels in the UK. The JSC examination consists of nine subjects totalling 900 marks, with each subject given 100 marks and the SSC examination consists of thirteen subjects totalling 1,250 marks, with each subject given 100 marks, excluding one subject given 50 marks, including practical tests for science subjects. A minimum of 33 marks are required to pass each subject and 17 in the 50 marked subject. Subjects will depend on which major program a student has elected to study. These major programs are Sciences; and Business Studies. Students have to elect one of these three programs just before enrolment in the 9th grade for SSC. Results of both the exams are published in the form of a GPA. The highest score is GPA-5.

== JSC results ==
Results from 2010 to 2014 for the Junior School Certificate level examinations are as follows:

Year	Total Examinees	Number of Passed	Pass Percentage	Obtained style="width:70px;"| Ranking	
2010	926	920	99.35%		
2011	935	934	99.89%		
2012	1069	1068	99.91%		N/A
2013					N/A
2014	1243	1239	99.68%	N/A	11th

=== SSC results ===
Results from 2006 to 2015 for the Secondary School Certificate level examinations are as follows:

Year	Total Examinees	Number of Passed	Pass Percentage	Obtained	Ranking
2006	406	398	97.04%		N/A
2007	407	381	93.61%		N/A
2008	460	452	98.26%		N/A
2009	573		99.30%		N/A
2010	680	678	99.30%		7th
2011	758	757	99.87%		N/A
2012	767	767	100%		N/A
2013					N/A
2014	884		99.43%		N/A
2015	1019	1018	99.9%		N/A

== Extracurricular activities ==
- Programming And Robotics
- Scouting
- Games and sports (mostly athletics, cricket, Badminton and football)
- Debating
- Picnic

Programming And Robotics club is the most active, after that Debating Club is Active. Programming And Robotics club has official websites, and they are running many programs and session's. Tahjibul Islam Robi is the current president of Cumilla Modern High School Programming And Robotics Club.

== See also ==
- Education in Bangladesh
- List of universities and schools in Comilla
- List of schools in Bangladesh
- List of Educational Institutions in Comilla
