= Chandina Government Model Pilot High School =

School in Comilla District, Bangladesh

- Bengali: চান্দিনা সরকারি মডেল পাইলট উচ্চ বিদ্যালয়

Location
- 23.4862°N 91.0073°E

Information
- Established: 1916; 110 years ago
- Gender: Mixed

Chandina Government Model Pilot High School (Bengali: চান্দিনা সরকারি মডেল পাইলট উচ্চ বিদ্যালয়) is a boys and girls high school in Chandina, Comilla District, Bangladesh. It was established in 1916.

== History ==
The school was established in 1916 as Barkamata Govt. Aided English School. The school's present 4.5 acres (1.8 ha) campus was acquired in 1920. In 1956, the school was renamed Chandina High School.

The school admitted only boys after a separate girls' school was established 200 yards (180 m) away in 1970. In 1980, the school became Chandina Pilot High School. In 2013, it became Chandina Model Pilot High School. Girls began to be admitted again, along with boys, in 2016. The school was nationalized on 13 September 2018, at which point it took its present name.

== Campus ==
The school has three academic buildings and an administrative building. There is a big field at the school. Other facilities include a mosque, workshop, canteen, shaheed minar, and library. The school has laboratories and a computer lab.

== Notable alumni ==
- Pran Gopal Datta, physician, vice-chancellor of Bangabandhu Sheikh Mujib Medical University, and member of parliament, matriculated in 1968.
