= Suniti Choudhury =

Indian nationalist (1917–1988)

- Born: 22 May 1917; Comilla, Bengal Presidency, British Raj
- Died: 12 January 1988 (aged 70)
- Known for: Assassinating a British magistrate at age 14
- Movement: Indian independence movement

Suniti Choudhury (22 May 1917 – 12 January 1988) was an Indian nationalist who, along with Santi Ghose, assassinated a British district magistrate when she was 14 years old and is known for her participation in an armed revolutionary struggle.

== Early life ==
Suniti Chowdhury was born on 22 May 1917 in Comilla of Comilla District of Bengal (present Bangladesh) to Umacharan Choudhury and Surasundari Choudhury in Bengali Kayastha family. She was a student of Nawab Faizunnessa Government Girls High School of Comilla.

== Revolutionary activities ==
Chowdhury was influenced by the revolutionary activities of Ullaskar Dutta, who also lived in Comilla. She was recruited to the Jugantar Party by Prafullanalini Brahma, another pupil. She was also the member of Tripura Zilla Chhatri Sangha. Chowdhury was selected as the Captain of the Women's Volunteer Corps in the Annual Conference of Tripura Zilla Chhatri Sangha, held on 6 May 1931. During this time, she was known by the alias of 'Meera Devi'. She was selected as the “custodian of firearms” and was in charge of training female members (of the Chhatri Sangha) in lathi, sword and dagger play.

== Assassination of Charles Stevens ==
On 14 December 1931, Chowdhury (14) and Santi Ghose (15) walked into the office of Charles Geoffrey Buckland Stevens, a British bureaucrat and the district magistrate of Comilla, under the pretense that they wanted to present a petition to arrange a swimming competition amongst their classmates. While Stevens looked at the document, Ghose and Chowdhury removed automatic pistols which were hidden under their shawls and shot and killed him.

=== Trial and sentence ===
The girls were taken into custody and imprisoned in the local British jail. In February 1932, Ghose and Chowdhury appeared in court in Calcutta. Being a minor, both of them were sentenced to jail for 10 years. In an interview, they stated, "It is better to die than live in a horse's stable."

She was held captive in Hijli Detention Camp as a "third class prisoner". The effects of her activities were also faced by her family, with her father's government pension being stopped, and her two elder brothers being held in custody without trial. Her younger brother died from consumption, exacerbated by years of malnutrition.

She was released with Santi Ghose in 1939, after having served seven years of her sentence, because of the amnesty negotiations between Mohandas Karamchand Gandhi and the British colonial authorities.

=== Public and media response ===
Contemporary Western periodicals portrayed the assassination as a sign of "Indians' outrage against an ordinance by the Earl of Willingdon that suppressed the civil rights of Indians, including that of free speech." Indian sources characterized the assassination as Ghose and Chowdbury's response to the "misbehaviors of the British district magistrates" who had abused their positions of power to sexually assault Indian women.

After the verdict was announced, a flyer was found by the intelligence branch of police in the Rajshahi district praising Ghose and Chowdbury as nationalist heroines. The poster read, "THOU ART FREEDOM'S NOW, AND FAME'S" and displayed photographs of the two girls alongside lines from Robert Burns' poem Scots Wha Hae:

"Tyrants fall in every foe!
Liberty's in every blow!"

== Later life and death ==
After her release, Chowdhury studied and passed M.B.B.S. and became a doctor. In 1947, Chowdhury married Trade Union Leader Pradyot Kumar Ghosh.

Chowdhury died on 12 January 1988.
