= Mainamoti Medical College =

Coordinates: 23.4556°N 91.2057°E

- Type: Private medical school
- Established: 2011
- Location: Cumilla, Bangladesh
- Website: Mainamoti Medical College

Mainamoti Medical College is a private medical college in Baropara, Comilla, Bangladesh. It is under the Chittagong Medical University.

== History ==
The college was established on 21 February in 2011. It was fined 10 million taka in November 2016 by Bangladesh High Court for admitting students that did not meet the admission requirements for medical college set by health ministry.

== See also ==
- List of Educational Institutions in Comilla
