= Nawab Faizunnesa Government Girls' High School =

- নবাব ফয়জুন্নেছা সরকারি বালিকা উচ্চ বিদ্যালয়

Location
- Comilla; Bangladesh; 23.4625°N 91.1771°E

Information
- Motto: Better Education For Better Citizen
- Established: 1873
- Enrollment: About 2000

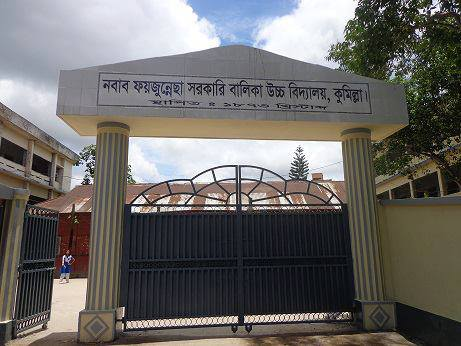
Front gate to the school

Nawab Faizunnesa Government Girls' High School is a girls' school in Comilla, Bangladesh, established in 1873 by Faizunnesa Choudhurani, who would in 1889 be titled India's only female nawab by Queen Victoria. Faizunnesa, a wealthy zamindar, established Faizunnesa Girls' Pilot High School, having noted the need for female education which would accommodate Muslim girls practising purdah. The school taught its children in the local Bengali language rather than Urdu or Persian which were the standard languages of education at the time. The students also learned English. During the early years of its establishment, it was treated as the English medium school for girls. It was converted to a junior high school in 1889, and to a high school in 1931.

== Notable alumni ==
- Bidya Sinha Saha Mim, Bangladeshi actress
- Santi Ghose, Indian nationalist
- Suniti Choudhury, Indian nationalist
