= Abdul Gani (officer) =

Bengali military officer, politician

- আবদুল গনি عبد الغنی
- Born: 1 December 1915; Brahmanpara, Bengal, British India
- Died: 11 November 1957 (aged 41); Frankfurt, Hesse, West Germany
- Burial place: Mainamati War Cemetery
- Education: Calcutta Islamia College
- Military career
- Allegiance: British India (1940-1947); Pakistan (1947-1953)
- Branch: British Indian Army; Pakistan Army
- Service years: 1940–1953
- Rank: Major
- Service number: PA-1003
- Units: 13th Frontier Force Rifles; 1st East Bengal Regiment
- Commands: Quarter Master of 1st East Bengal Regiment
- Conflicts: World War II

Abdul Gani (c. 1915 – 11 November 1957) was a Bengali military officer and considered to be the founder of the East Bengal Regiment.

== Early life ==
Abdul Gani was born in Nagaish village of Brahmanpara Upazila, Comilla District, Bengal on 1 December 1915. His father, Sharat Ali was a farmer. His mother's name was Jobeda Khatun. Abdul Gani got his elementary education in a madrasa at Sidlai and then moved to Chittagong for higher education in 1933. He was admitted to Chittagong High Madrasa for a short period before leaving in July 1935 to get admission for Khulna Zilla School. He passed the Entrance Examinations in the following year from the same school. Gani was admitted to the Calcutta Islamia College in April 1936. He passed the Intermediate and Higher Secondary Degree examinations in 1938 and 1940 respectively.

== Career ==
=== Military career ===
Abdul Gani received an emergency commission into the 13th Frontier Force Rifles of the British Indian Army in 1940, during the Second World War. As a mark of his courage, he was nicknamed "Tiger Gani". Following the Partition of India, he joined the East Bengal Regiment Training Company of 1st East Bengal Regiment of Pakistan Army. He was promoted to the rank of captain 1948. He was promoted to Brevet Major on 3 December 1953. He retired from the Army on 4 December 1953.

=== Political career ===
Abdul Gani joined politics in 1954 and became a member of the East Pakistan Provincial Assembly as an independent candidate. During his tenure, he was instrumental in proposing the foundation of Cadet College in East Pakistan. He played a role in the Language movement of Bangladesh.

== Death ==
Abdul Gani died on 11 November 1957, in Frankfurt, West Germany. He had gone there as the leader of the Pakistan Delegation at the World Veteran Soldiers' Conference. He was buried in Mainamati Cantonment in Comilla.
