= Hasan Ali Government High School =

Chandpur Hasan Ali Government High School
- চাঁদপুর হাসান আলী সরকারি উচ্চ বিদ্যালয়
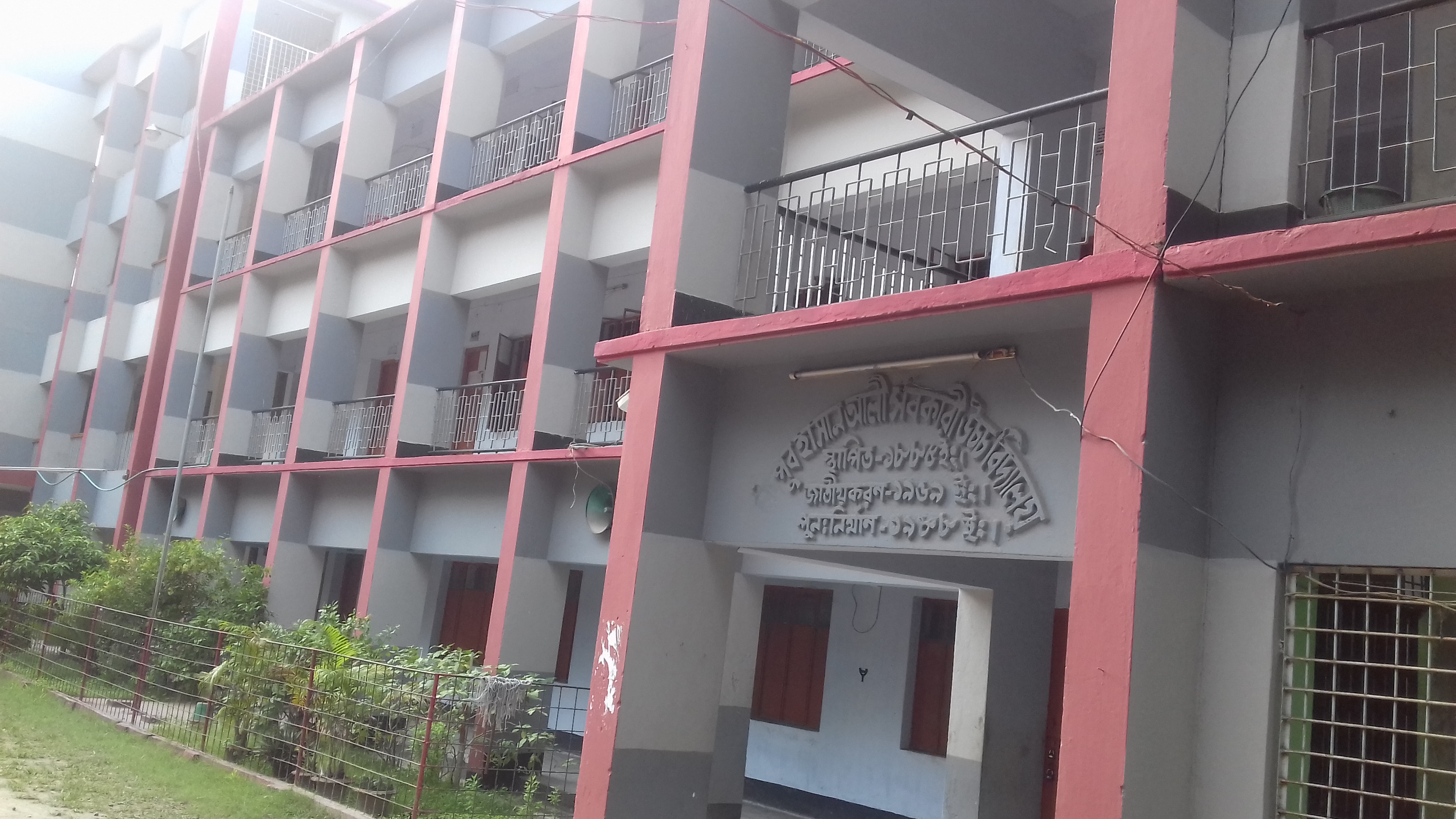

Location
- Comilla Road; Chandpur, 3600; Bangladesh

Information
- Motto: Enter to learn & leave to lead
- Established: 1885 - Government-run since 1969
- Founder: Zamindar Hasan Ali
- School board: Comilla Education Board
- School district: Chandpur
- Superintendent: Sadar
- School code: 103496
- Principal: Mominul Hoque Sardar
- Staff: 3
- Teaching staff: 53
- Grades: 6–10
- Gender: Boys
- Age range: 11–16
- Enrollment: 1,300
- Language: Bengali
- Hours in school day: 6 hours
- Campus type: Urban
- Colours: White and off white
- Sports: Football, cricket, badminton, hockey, volleyball, handball
- Website: www.facebook.com/chaghs

Chandpur Hasan Ali Government High School stands along the Chandpur–Cumilla highway in the heart of Chandpur city, Bangladesh.

== History ==
The school was established in 1885 by philanthropist Hassan Ali, who hailed from the neighboring Lakshmipur District. The school was established during celebration era of Silver Jubilee of Queen Victoria, therefore, it was named as Chandpur Hasan Ali Jubilee High School. Since May 1, 1969 the then East Pakistan Govt took control of the management. Initially the school was coeducational for boys and girls. The women's college premise used to be the Muslim Hostel of the school. Zamindar Marhum Ahmed Raja Chowdhury established the Muslim Hostel. The School is known as one of the oldest in the city of Chandpur and the 5th oldest in the then Chittagong Division. A detailed history of the School has been written by M. Abdul Hamid Mazumder (M.A, M.Ed., LL.B), who served as the Headmaster of the School from 1949 to 1972. The School celebrated its 125-year anniversary in December 2012. The School has produced notable educators, civic leaders and educators at home and abroad. At its inception the School was located near Kalibari, for 34 years. In 1919, the school moved to its current location. At that stage the School was a two-storey red brick building. The current three story yellow building is about 20 years old. The running Head Master of this school is Mrs. Sultana Ferdous Ara.

=== Extra-curricular activities ===
This school takes part in many activities, such as-

- Bangladesh National Cadet Core (BNCC)
- Red Crescent
- Debate Club
- English Spoken Club
- Scout
- Science Festival
- Quiz
- General Knowledge
- Wall Magazine
- School Sports Centre
- Math Olympiad
- Music Club (HAGHSMC organised by school's SSC batch 2023)

A student of this school took part in World Scout Jamboree as a representative of Bangladesh. He is the only student of Bangladesh who took part in World Scout Jamboree in Sweden. A student of this school took part in Global Action Model United Nations 2022 in italy as a representative of Bangladesh. This Student Name is Al Abrar Islam (Arian)

=== Library ===
This school has two rich libraries. One is Bishya Sahitya Kendra-BRAC Joined Library and another is School's Self Library. There are 25,000 books in these libraries. It is the largest school library of Bangladesh.

=== Shift ===
Now it is running on two shifts called morning and day.
