= Comilla Medical College =

Medical college in Bangladesh

- কুমিল্লা মেডিকেল কলেজ
- Logo of Comilla Medical College
- Type: Public medical college
- Academic affiliations: Chittagong Medical University
- Principal: Mirza Tayebul Islam
- Students: About 900
- Location: Comilla, Bangladesh; 23.4511°N 91.2022°E
- Campus: Urban
- Language: English
- Website: comc.college.gov.bd

Comilla Medical College (Bengali: কুমিল্লা মেডিকেল কলেজ) is a government medical school in Bangladesh, established in 1979. It is located in the eastern city of Comilla. It is affiliated with Chittagong Medical University.

It has an annual intake of 200 students for its five-year course of study leading to a Bachelor of Medicine, Bachelor of Surgery (MBBS) degree. A one-year internship after graduation is compulsory for all graduates. The degree is recognised by the Bangladesh Medical and Dental Council.

The college is associated with the 500-bed Comilla Medical College Hospital. Journal of Comilla Medical College Teachers Association is the official journal of the college.

== History ==
The government of Bangladesh founded Comilla Medical College on 28 September 1979. It was established by upgrading an existing Medical Assistant Training School (MATS). Instruction began in 1981 but then stopped. Construction of Comilla Medical College Hospital began in 1987. The 250-bed hospital was inaugurated on 11 January 1992. Academic activities restarted with the 1991-1992 school year.

The college closed for a week in January 2018 following violent clashes between opposing factions of the Bangladesh Chhatra League.

== Campus ==
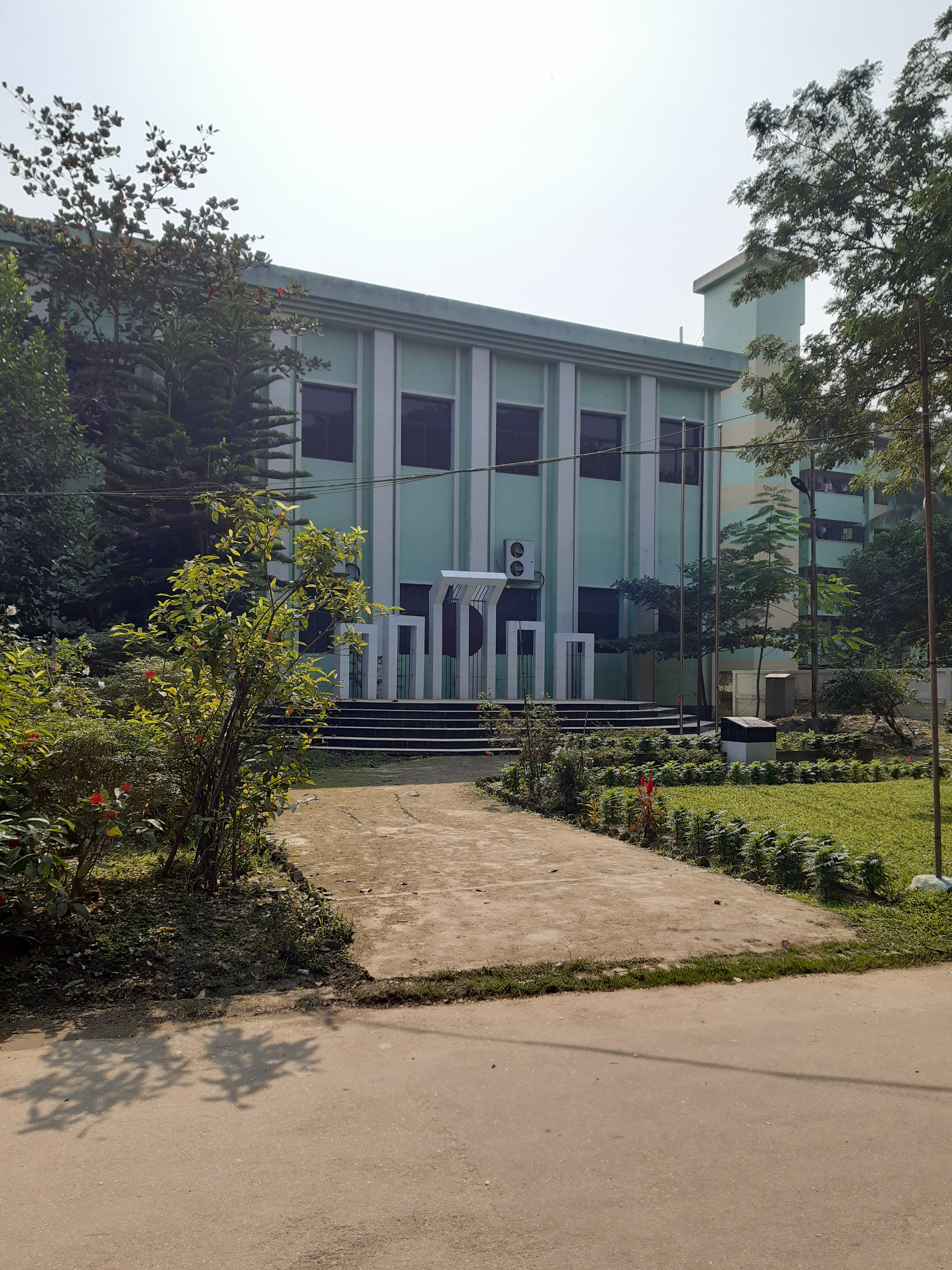
Comilla Medical College Shaheed Minar

The college is located in the Kuchaitali neighbourhood of Comilla. The 11 acres (4.5 ha) campus contains two multi-story academic buildings and an associated 500-bed hospital. There are also separate hostels for men, women, interns, and postgraduate students. Other amenities include a playing field, Shaheed Minar, and mosque.

There is a nursing college affiliated with the hospital.

== Organization and administration ==
The college has been affiliated with Chittagong Medical University since 2017. Before that, it was affiliated with the University of Chittagong. As of June 2026, the principal of the college is Mirza Mohammad Tyeabul Islam.

== Academics ==
The college offers a five-year course of study, approved by the Bangladesh Medical and Dental Council (BMDC), leading to a Bachelor of Medicine, Bachelor of Surgery (MBBS) degree. The degree is awarded by Chittagong Medical University. After passing the final professional exam, there is a compulsory one-year internship. The internship is a prerequisite for obtaining registration from the BMDC to practice medicine.

The college is also recognised by the Bangladesh College of Physicians and Surgeons for post-graduate training under Bangladesh Medical University in six disciplines: anaesthesiology, gynaecology and obstetrics, paediatrics, orthopaedic surgery, and radiology.

Admission for Bangladeshis to the MBBS course at all medical colleges in Bangladesh is controlled centrally. The Directorate General of Health Services (DGHS) sets a written multiple-choice question exam. On a given day the exam is administered simultaneously across the country. It sets prerequisites for who can take the exam, and sets a minimum pass level. DGHS has varied the admission rules over the years, but historically candidates have been admitted based primarily on their score on this test. Grades at the Secondary School Certificate (SSC) and Higher Secondary Certificate (HSC) level have also been a factor, as part of a combined score or as a prerequisite for taking the exam. DGHS also admits candidates to fill quotas: freedom fighters descendants, tribal, foreign, and others. Admission for foreign students is based on their SSC and HSC grades. As of July 2022, the college is allowed to admit 200 students annually.

== Journals ==
Journal of Comilla Medical College Teachers Association is the official journal of the college.

== See also ==
- List of medical colleges in Bangladesh
- List of dental schools in Bangladesh
- List of educational institutions in Comilla District
