= Bangladesh Army International University of Science & Technology =

University In Bangladesh

Bangladesh Army International University of Science and Technology (BAIUST)
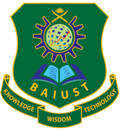
- logo of BAIUST
- Other name: BAIUST
- Motto: Knowledge, Wisdom, Technology
- Type: Army Administrated, Private
- Established: 14 February 2015; 11 years ago
- Affiliations: University Grants Commission; Bangladesh Army
- Chancellor: President Mirza Fakhrul Islam Alamgir
- Vice-Chancellor: Brigadier General Md Kamal Uddin Komol
- Students: 3000
- Location: Syedpur, Adarsha Sadar, Comilla, Bangladesh; 23.46606°N 91.09678°E
- Campus: 14 acres (5.7 ha)
- Language: English, Bengali
- Website: www.baiust.ac.bd

Bangladesh Army International University of Science and Technology (BAIUST), a private university affiliated with the Bangladesh Army, started its journey on 14 February 2015.

== Location ==
BAIUST conducts its operations from its main campus situated in Comilla, with infrastructural support from Cumilla Cantonment. The permanent campus is located in Kalakachua, near the Dhaka-Chittagong Highway. Comilla, an eastern city in Bangladesh, falls within the Chittagong Division. Previously, BAIUST functioned across two campuses: Campus-1 was positioned adjacent to the Bir Shrestha Mostafa Kamal gate, while Campus-2 was situated on the opposite side of the gate, adjacent to the Station HQ Office. These campuses were separated by the Dhaka-Chittagong Highway and connected by the First Highway Underpass constructed by the Bangladesh Army.

== Faculties ==
4 faculties with 9 departments

Faculty of Electronics and Communication Engineering:

- Bachelor of Science in electrical and electronic engineering
- Bachelor of Science in computer science and engineering
- Bachelor of Science (Hons) in information and communication technology

Faculty of Civil Engineering:

- Bachelor of Science in civil engineering.

School of Business:

- Bachelor of Business Administration.
- Bachelor of Economics.

Faculty of Science and Humanities:

- Department of English.
- Department of Law.
- Department of Sc. & Hum.

4-year bachelor's degree, 1/2-year MBA, 1-year ELT program available.

== Board of trustees ==
BAIUST is directly controlled by the Bangladesh Army, and the members of the board of trustees are directly from the Bangladesh Army. The chief of army staff of the Bangladesh Army is the chairman of the trustee board, and other high-ranking government officials, professors, and area commanders of the 33 Infantry Division of the Bangladesh Army are placed on the board by their ranks and posts.

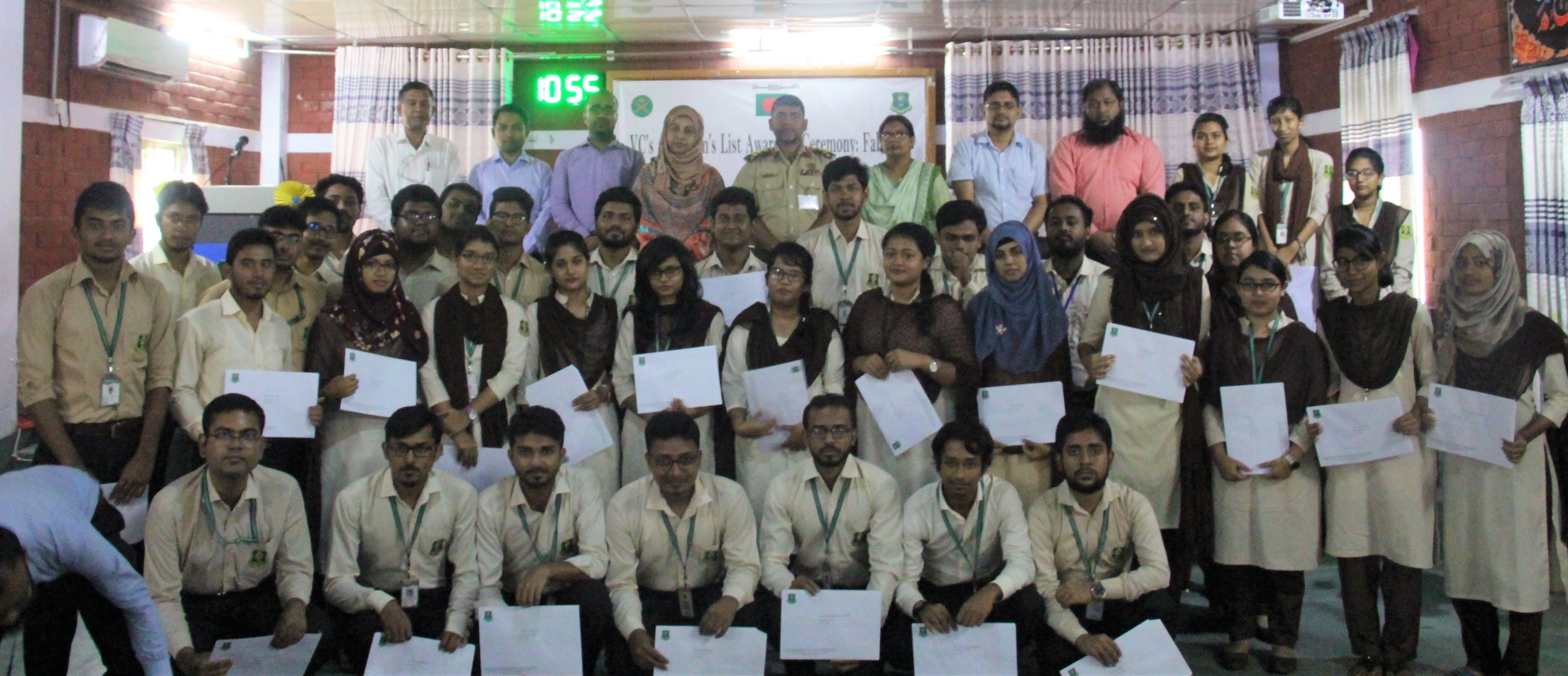
Vc's & Dean's List Award - 2019

== See also ==
- List of Educational Institutions in Comilla
