= Comilla Sadar Dakshin Upazila =

Upazila in Chattogram Division, Bangladesh

Comilla Sadar Dakshin কুমিল্লা সদর দক্ষিণ
- Upazila
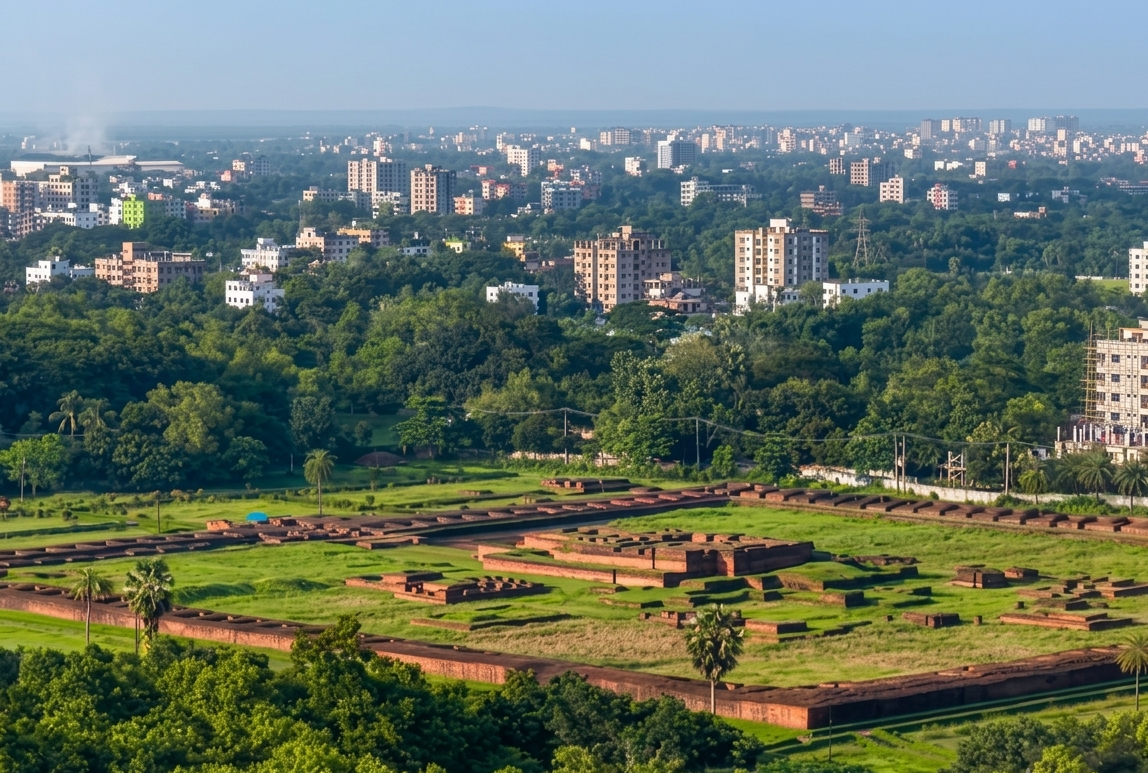
- Kotbari

- Coordinates: 23°22′N 91°12′E
- Country: Bangladesh
- Division: Chittagong
- District: Comilla

Area
  - Upazila: 128.02 km^{2} (49.43 sq mi)
  - Urban: 22.50 km^{2} (8.69 sq mi)

Population (2022)
  - Upazila: 341,096
  - Density: 2,664.4/km^{2} (6,900.8/sq mi)
  - Urban: 156,765
  - Urban density: 6,967/km^{2} (18,050/sq mi)
- Time zone: UTC+6 (BST)
- Postal code: 3500
- Area code: 081
- Website: sadarsouth.comilla.gov.bd

Comilla Sadar Dakshin Upazila mauza geocode map

Comilla Sadar Dakshin Upazila (Bengali: কুমিল্লা সদর দক্ষিণ উপজেলা) (Comilla Central South Upazila) is an upazila of Comilla District in Chattogram Division, Bangladesh.

== Demographics ==
Religions in Comilla Sadar Dakshin Upazila (2022)
Religion	Percent
Islam	96.57%
Hinduism	3.40%
Other or not stated	0.03%

According to the 2022 Bangladeshi census, Sadar Dakkhin Upazila had 41,028 households and a population of 184,331. 11.28% of the population were under 5 years of age. Sadar Dakkhin had a literacy rate (age 7 and over) of 76.69%: 77.33% for males and 76.14% for females, and a sex ratio of 88.75 males for every 100 females. 9,828 (5.33%) lived in urban areas.

According to the 2011 Census of Bangladesh, the residual Comilla Sadar Dakshin Upazila had 50,621 households and a population of 258,278. 60,785 (23.53%) were under 10 years of age. Comilla Sadar Dakshin had a literacy rate (age 7 and over) of 59.83%, compared to the national average of 51.8%, and a sex ratio of 1007 females per 1000 males. 103,710 (40.15%) lived in urban areas. 248,420 (96.18%) were Muslims and 9,439 (3.65%) Hindus.

== Administration ==
Comilla Sadar Dakshin Upazila is divided into Comilla Dakshin Municipality (part of the city of Comilla) and 14 union parishads:

Bagmara Dakshin, Bagmara Uttar, Baropara, Belgor Dakshin, Belgor Uttar, Bhuloin Dakshin, Bhuloin Uttar, Bijoypur, Chuwara, Goliara, Pachim Jorkanon, Purba Jorkanon, Perul Dakshin, and Perul Uttar. The union parishads are subdivided into 318 mauzas and 375 villages.

After the separation of Lalmai Upazila, the upazila now has 6 union parishads:

1. Barapara
2. Bijoypur
3. Chouara
4. Galiara
5. Paschim Jorekaran
6. Purba Jorekaran

Comilla Dakshin Municipality is subdivided into 9 wards and 63 mahallas.

== See also ==
- Upazilas of Bangladesh
- Districts of Bangladesh
- Divisions of Bangladesh
