= Comilla Government Women's College =

Bangladeshi College

Coordinates: 23.4563°N 91.1831°E

- কুমিল্লা সরকারি মহিলা কলেজ
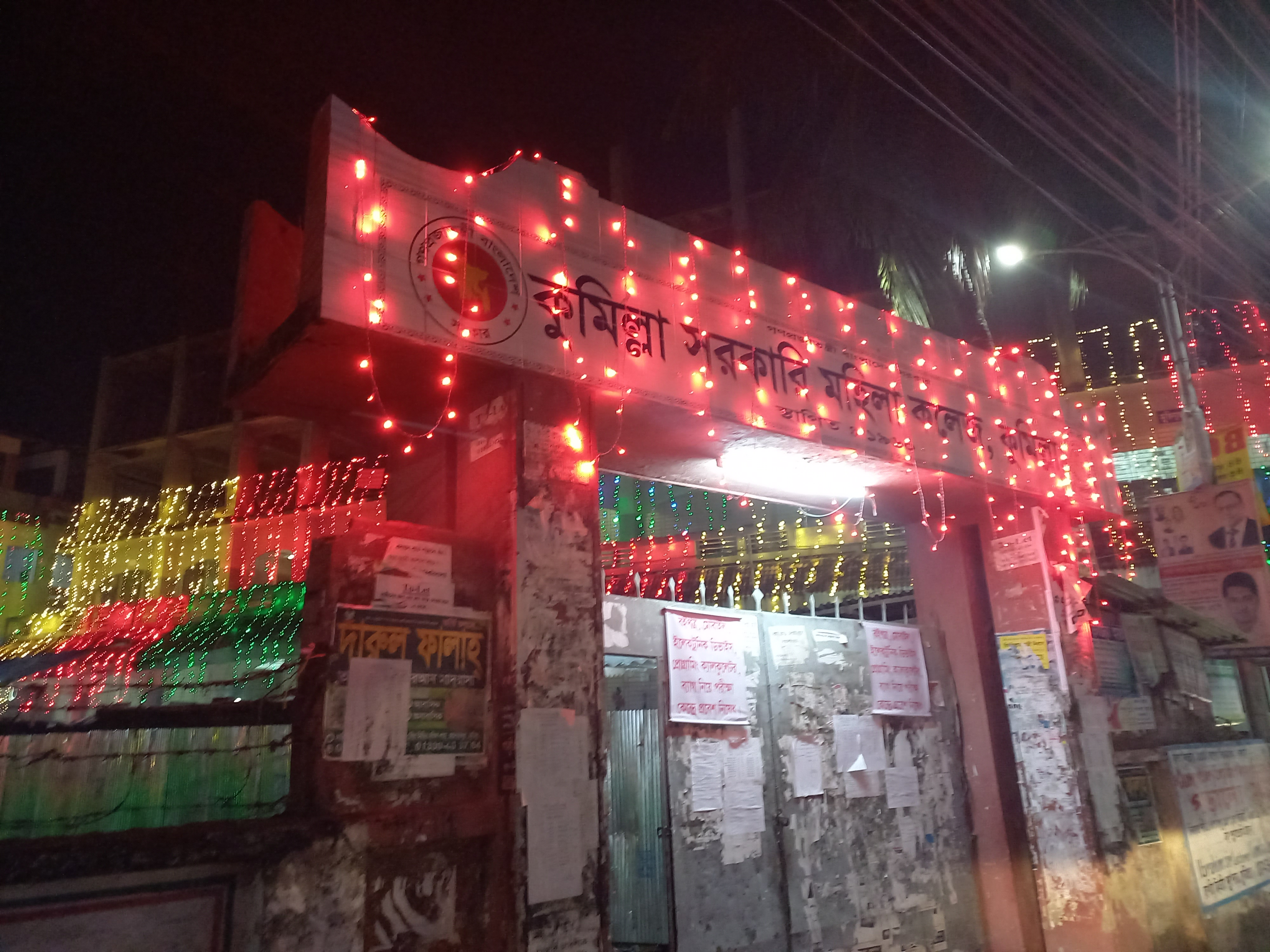
- Type: Government college
- Established: 1960
- Affiliations: Bangladesh National University, Board of Intermediate and Secondary Education, Comilla
- Location: Comilla, Bangladesh
- Website: cumillagwc.edu.bd

Comilla Government Women's College (Bengali: কুমিল্লা সরকারি মহিলা কলেজ, romanized: Cumilla Shorkari Mahila College), is a public college in Comilla, Bangladesh established in 1960. The college is located in Comilla including its Intermediate, Honors and Masters section.

== Departments ==
- Bangla
- Botany
- Chemistry
- English
- Economics
- Islamic History and Culture
- Mathematics
- Philosophy
- Political Science
- Physics
- Social Works
- Zoology

== See also ==
- List of Educational Institutions in Comilla
