= Cumilla Government College =

Public college in Cumilla, Bangladesh

Coordinates: 23.46555°N 91.17339°E

- কুমিল্লা সরকারি কলেজ
- College logo
- Other name: CGC
- Former name: Comilla College
- Type: Public college
- Established: 1968; 58 years ago
- Founders: Abul Khair; Sajedul Haque; Mohammad Nurul Haque
- Academic affiliations: Cumilla Education Board; National University
- Location: Cumilla, Bangladesh
- Campus: c. 2.7 acres; Urban
- Educational Institute Identification Number (EIIN): 105824
- National University code: 3702
- Website: www.cgcc.edu.bd

Cumilla Government College (Bengali: কুমিল্লা সরকারি কলেজ, romanized: Cumilla Shorkari College) is a public college in the Police Line area of Cumilla, Bangladesh. Established as Comilla College in 1968, it was nationalised in 1985. The college offers higher-secondary courses under the Cumilla Education Board and bachelor's pass and honours programmes affiliated with National University.

== History ==
=== Establishment and early years ===
Comilla College was established as a private college in 1968 through the efforts of lawyer Abul Khair, lawyer Sajedul Haque and industrialist Mohammad Nurul Haque. The site had previously been a zamindar's house associated with Jatindra Chandra Kar and Rabindra Kar; the family had left for India before the 1947 partition of India, and the site was later used as a regional East Pakistan Rifles camp. The college began with higher-secondary classes, and students first sat the HSC examination at its own centre in 1972.

=== Nationalisation and expansion ===
The college was nationalised in 1985. Its first honours programmes—in English, Accounting, Management and Political Science—began around 1995. Bengali and Mathematics were later added. Economics was included in plans for 2017–18, but the National University had not authorised honours admissions in the subject by 2025.

== Academics ==
The college offers higher-secondary courses in science, humanities and business studies. Its bachelor's pass programmes are B.A., B.S.S. and B.B.S. Honours programmes are offered in six subjects: Bengali, English, Political Science, Accounting, Management and Mathematics.

== Campus and facilities ==
The college entrance in 2018.

A college building and grounds in 2018.

The college's urban campus is in the Police Line area of Cumilla and covers about 2.7 acres. The building list on the college's website includes a former two-storey administrative building used for the teachers' council and girls' common room, a three-storey administrative building and honours building, the principal's residence, a boys' common room and two tin-shed academic buildings. In April 2025, the college announced a hired bus service between Companiganj and the campus.

== Student life ==
Students take part in competitions during the annual education, literature and culture week. In 2026, the college announced a team-formation process for the Prime Minister's Gold Cup national football tournament.
