= Kangshanagar =

Kangshanagar কংশনগর
- Village
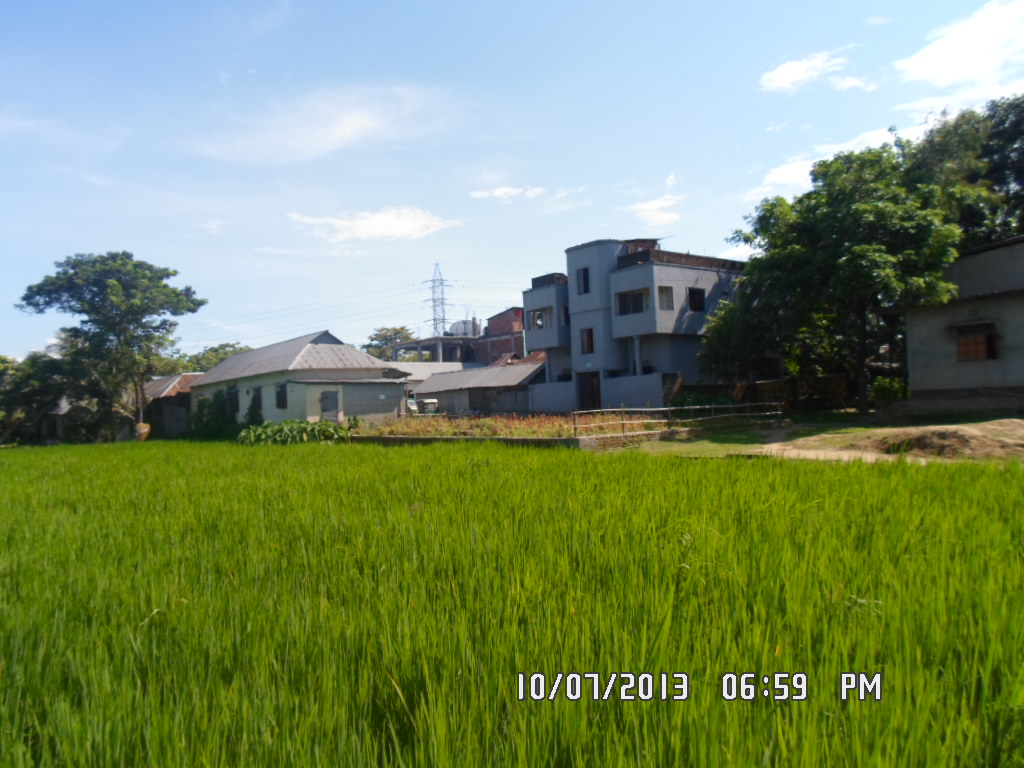
- A Snap of East Kangshanagar

- Location within Bangladesh
- Coordinates: 23.5506°N 91.0566°E
- Country: Bangladesh
- Division: Chittagong
- District: Comilla
- Upzilla: Burichang Upazila
- Union: Bharella

Population (2013)
  - Total: 3,747
- Time zone: UTC+06:00 (BST)

Kangshanagar (Bengali: কংশনগর) is a village and large market place in Bangladesh. It is situated in Bharella which is in Burichang Upazila, Comilla District. It stands beside the river of Gumti. Approximately 3,747 people live in Kangshanagar.

== Roads and highway ==
The highway between Comilla and Sylhet passes through Kangshanagar and connect to Dhaka-Chittagong highway in Comilla cantonment. There is another link road which connects Kangshanagar with the biggest highway in Nimshar.

== Economy ==
The convenient communication to Kangshanagar by river and highway makes it very important to the country. The Kangshanagar Bazar (Kangshanagar Market) supplies vegetables, crops and other agricultural products. Because of the food supplying importance Kangshanagar has two cold storage and so many agricultural storage center. There is more than 500 permanent shops and hundreds of temporary shops. It has two market day in every week, Saturday and Wednesday. During the markets day it becomes very crowded with the inhabitants from the villages around the market place. It has three Hospital with a good number of pharmacy, restaurants, bakery, stationary shops, libraries and other entertainment stations. Kangshanagar Bazar also famous for its annual "Ghror Bazar" (A place where people buy and sell cows).

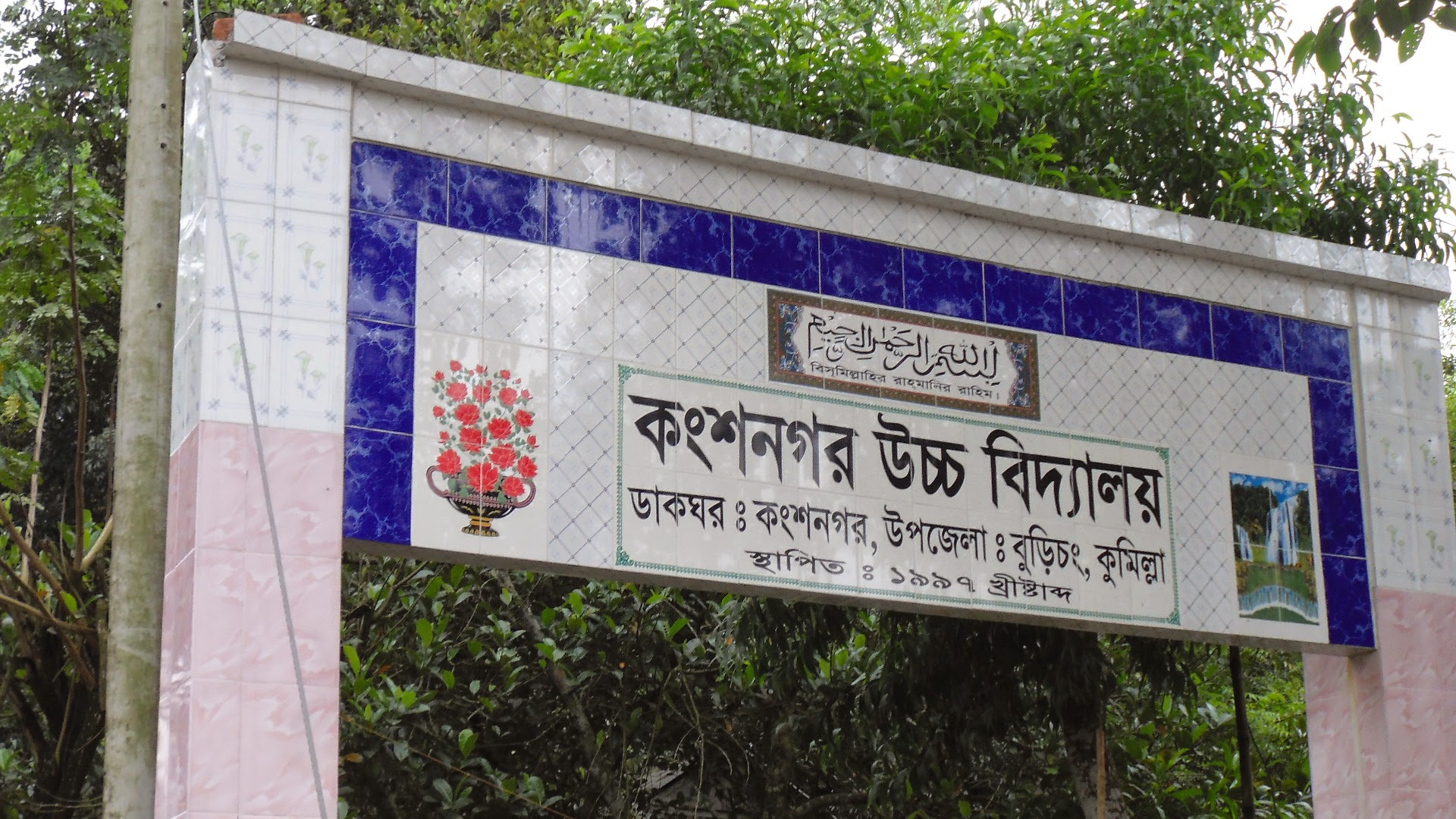
Kangshanagar High School Gate

== Education ==
There are 3 educational institutions in Kangshanagar. They are Kangshanagar High School, Kangshanagar Government Primary School and Kangshanagar Islamia Senior (Alim) Madrasha. All of these educational institutes situated in the walking distance from the bus stations.

== Public offices ==
The economical importance and convenient communication with comilla city make Kangshanagar one of the significant place in the region. This is why it has several important public offices like Bharella Union council office and Regional agricultural center is situated here.
