= A. K. M. Bahauddin =

Bangladeshi politician

A. K. M. Bahauddin Bahar
- আ ক ম বাহাউদ্দিন বাহার
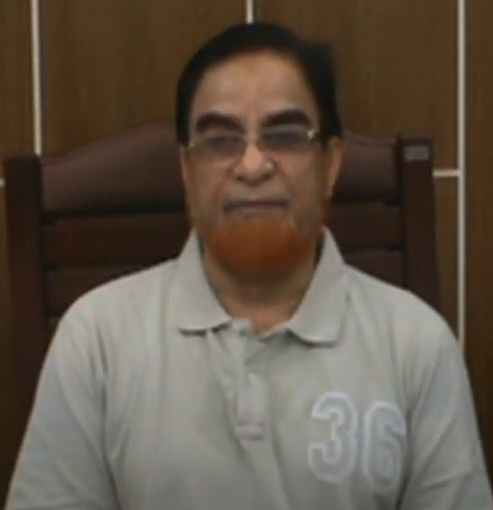
- Bahar in 2021

Member of Parliament
- In office 25 January 2009 – 5 August 2024
- Preceded by: Redwan Ahmed
- Succeeded by: Manirul Haque Chowdhury
- Constituency: Comilla-6

Personal details
- Born: 19 May 1954 (age 72) Comilla, East Bengal, Dominion of Pakistan
- Party: Bangladesh Awami League
- Children: Tahseen Bahar Shuchona

Abul Khayer Muhammad Bahauddin Bahar (born 19 May 1954) is a Bangladeshi politician from Awami League and a former Jatiya Sangsad member representing the Comilla-6 constituency.

== Early life ==
Bahauddin was born on 19 May 1954 in Comilla. He graduated with a bachelor of arts degree.

== Career ==
Bahauddin was elected to Parliament in 2008 from Comilla-6 as a candidate of Awami League. He had received 126 thousand votes while his nearest competitor, Mohammad Amin Ur Rashid Yeasin of Bangladesh Nationalist Party, received 102 thousand votes. He served in the parliamentary standing committee on the Ministry of Social Welfare.

Bahauddin was again elected to parliament from Comilla-6 in 2014 as a candidate of Awami League. He had received 59 thousand votes while his nearest competitor, Director-FBCCI Masud Parvez Khan Imran who stood as an independent candidate received 38 thousand votes. The general election was boycotted by all major parties and Awami League had won majority of the seats uncontested.

On 15 October 2014, Bahauddin sued three staff members of Independent TV and its owner Salman F Rahman. He filed a case over a report on 29 September 2014 titled Several ministers, MPs patrons of BNP-Jamaat misdeeds.

On 10 May 2015, supporters of Bahauddin and Mujibul Haque Mujib clashed in the Comilla Town Hall resulting in the death of one activist of Bangladesh Chhatra League.

Members of the Awami League secretariat called for official action against Bahauddin over his role in the Comilla City Corporation poll in April 2017. He had refused to work for the Awami League candidate of mayor, Anjum Sultana Sima, as he was a rival of her father, Afzal Khan. Monirul Haque Sakku, candidate of Bangladesh Nationalist Party, defeated Anjum Sultana Sima in the election as a result of Awami League's internal conflicts.

Bahauddin served in the parliamentary standing committee on commerce. The committee recommended that the Trading Corporation of Bangladesh should select dealers through the recommendation of Members of Parliament. Bahauddin stated that dealers who were appointed on the recommendation of Members of Parliament "acted properly".

Bahauddin was re-elected to Parliament from Comilla-6 in 2018 as a candidate of Awami League in a landslide. He had received 296 thousand votes while is closest rival, Md Aminur Rashid of Bangladesh Nationalist Party, had received 18 thousand votes.

He won the Comilla-6 seat in the 2024 National Election with 132,210 votes, defeating his closest competitor, Anjum Sultana Sima, who represented the Eagle symbol.

Bahauddin request Comilla District administration to demolish Birchandra Ganapathagar (also known as Comilla Town Hall) and replace it with a modern structure. The Daily Star was critical of the decision and described the 135 year old town hall as "historic". He is an advisor to the town hall. Following protests of the decision the Ministry of Cultural Affairs called for a mass hearing to decide the fate of the town hall. Anjum Sultana Sima, Member of Parliament from reserved seat, blamed Bahauddin for instigating the demolition of the town hall. His supporters crowded the mass hearing and left no room for citizens to participate on 20 December 2020.

Bahauddin threatened the deputy director of Department of Environment in Comilla District, Shawkat Ara Kol, after she had inspected a site of Roads and Highway Department for environmental impact. She had also issued notices to contractors of the Roads and Highway Department.

In 2023, During the celebration of minority community he made a derogatory statements about a Hindu festival and even attacked Hindus, Bahauddin called 'Durga Puja' as an 'Alcohol Festival'. Bangladesh Hindu Buddhist Christian Unity Council organised protests against Bahauddin Bahar's comments that reportedly hurt Hindu sentiments. His supporters attacked the minority group in Comilla.

Following the fall of the Sheikh Hasina led Awami League government, Bahauddin's home in Comilla was burned down and vandalized in February 2025. On 28 November 2026 in retaliation for the Awami League burning down of the home S M Jilani, his residence was burned down again by the Bangladesh Nationalist Party.
