= M. A. Zaher =

M. A. Zaher may refer to:

- M. A. Zaher (geologist)
- M. A. Zaher (politician)
