= 2022 Comilla City Corporation election =

Mayoral election in Bangladesh

2022 Cumilla City Corporation election
- 15 June 2022
- Registered: 229,920 (▲10.77 pp)
- Turnout: 58.62% (▼5.30 pp)
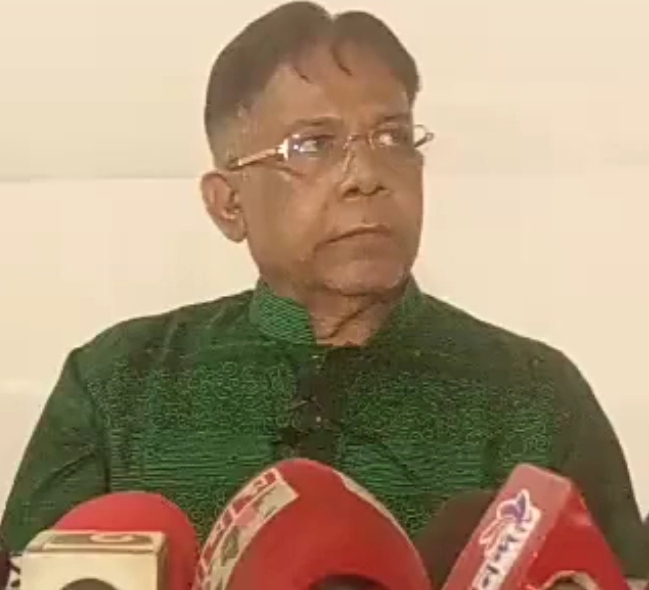
	First party	Second party	Third party
Candidate	Arfanul Haque Rifat	Monirul Haque Sakku	Nizamuddin Kaiser
Party	AL	Independent	Independent
Popular vote	50,310	49,967	29,099
Percentage	37.34%	37.08%	21.60%
Swing	▼6.26 pp	▼14.88 pp	▲21.60 pp
Mayor before election
Monirul Haque Sakku
BNP
Elected Mayor
Arfanul Haque Rifat
AL
- Council election
- 15 June 2022; 36 seats in the Comilla City Corporation
Party	Leader	Seats	+/–
AL	Arfanul Haque Rifat	21	+6
BNP	Didn’t contest	5	−3
Jamaat	—	2	−1
Independent	—	8	−2
This lists parties that won seats. See the complete results below.

The 2022 Comilla City Corporation election was an election in Comilla, Bangladesh, held on 15 June 2022 to elect the 3rd Mayor of Comilla and the city councillors of the Comilla City Corporation. Awami League candidate Arfanul Haque Rifat won the mayoral election by defeating independent candidate and incumbent mayor Monirul Haque Sakku.

== Mayoral election results ==
Comilla Mayoral Election 2022
Party	Candidate	Votes	%	±%
AL	Arfanul Haque Rifat	50,310	37.34	−6.26
Independent	Monirul Haque Sakku	49,967	37.08	−14.88
Independent	Nizamuddin Kaiser	29,099	21.60	+21.60
Majority		343	0.26	New
Turnout		134,801	58.62	−5.30
Registered electors		229,920		
AL gain from BNP				

== Council election results ==
=== Party-wise ===
2022 Comilla City Corporation council election results (party-wise)
Party	Winning seats
Bangladesh Awami League	21
Bangladesh Nationalist Party	5
Bangladesh Jamaat-e-Islami	2
Independent	8
Total	36
