= Md. Jashim Uddin (politician) =

Bangladeshi politician

- মোঃ জসীম উদ্দিন

Member of the Bangladesh Parliament for Comilla-5
- Incumbent
- Assumed office 17 February 2026
- Preceded by: M. A. Zaher

Personal details
- Born: March 1, 1965 (age 61) Brahmanpara Upazila, Comilla District
- Party: Bangladesh Jamaat-e-Islami

Md. Jashim Uddin is a Bangladeshi politician of the Bangladesh Nationalist Party. He is currently serving as a member of parliament from Comilla-5.

== Early life ==
Uddin was born on 1 March 1965 in Brahmanpara Upazila in Comilla District.
