= Abul Hashem Khan =

Bangladeshi politician (1955–2024)

- আবুল হাশেম খান

Member of Parliament for Comilla-5
- In office 24 June 2021 – 10 January 2024
- Preceded by: Abdul Matin Khasru
- Succeeded by: M. A. Zaher

Personal details
- Born: 31 December 1955 North village, Burichang Upazila, Comilla District, East Pakistan, Pakistan
- Died: 31 January 2024 (aged 68) Dhaka, Bangladesh
- Party: Bangladesh Awami League

Abul Hashem Khan (31 December 1955 – 31 January 2024) was a Bangladesh Awami League politician who was the Jatiya Sangsad member representing Comilla-5 from 2021 to 2024.

== Life and career ==
Khan was the president of Burichang Upazila Awami League and former PP. When Abdul Matin Khasru, member of parliament for the Comilla-5 constituency, died on 14 April 2021, he was elected unopposed as a member of parliament on 24 June 2021 in the by-election of the vacant constituency.

Khan died on 31 January 2024, at the age of 68.
