= Comilla-5 =

Constituency of Bangladesh's Jatiya Sangsad

Coordinates: 23.55°N 91.13°E

- Constituency for the Jatiya Sangsad
- District: Comilla District
- Division: Chittagong Division
- Electorate: 476,172 (2026)

Current constituency
- Created: 1973
- Party: Bangladesh Nationalist Party
- Member: Md. Jashim Uddin
- ← 252 Comilla-4 254 Comilla-6 →

Comilla-5 is a constituency represented in the Jatiya Sangsad (National Parliament) of Bangladesh since 2026 by Md. Jashim Uddin of the Bangladesh Nationalist Party.

== Boundaries ==
The constituency encompasses Brahmanpara and Burichang upazilas.

== History ==
The constituency was created for the first general elections in newly independent Bangladesh, held in 1973.

== Members of Parliament ==
Election	Member	Party
1973	Abdul Kuddas Makhan	Awami League
1979	Habib Ullah Khan	Bangladesh Nationalist Party
Major Boundary Changes
1986	Mohammad Yunus	Jatiya Party
1988	Mohammad Yunus	Jatiya Party
1991	Abdul Matin Khasru	Awami League
Feb 1996	Mujibur Rahman	Bangladesh Nationalist Party
Jun 1996	Abdul Matin Khasru	Awami League
2001	Mohammad Yunus	Bangladesh Nationalist Party
2008	Abdul Matin Khasru	Awami League
2014	Abdul Matin Khasru	Awami League
2018	Abdul Matin Khasru	Awami League
Jun 2021 by-election	Abul Hashem Khan	Awami League
2024	M A Zaher	Independent
2026	Md. Jashim Uddin	Bangladesh Nationalist Party

== Elections ==
=== Elections in the 2020s ===
General Election 2026: Comilla-5
Party	Candidate	Votes	%	±%
BNP	Md. Jashim Uddin	134,485	51.29	+16.99
Jamaat	Mobarak Hossen	124,547	47.50	+47.50
Majority		9,938	3.79	−88.61
Turnout		262,185	55.06	−11.94
Registered electors		476,172		
BNP gain from Independent				

=== Elections in the 2010s ===
General Election 2014: Comilla-5
Party	Candidate	Votes	%	±%
AL	Abdul Matin Khasru	206,931	96.2	+32.5
JP(E)	Safikur Rahman	8,157	3.8	N/A
Majority		198,774	92.4	+63.1
Turnout		215,088	67.0	−16.2
AL hold				

=== Elections in the 2000s ===
General Election 2008: Comilla-5
Party	Candidate	Votes	%	±%
AL	Abdul Matin Khasru	143,208	63.7	+18.0
BNP	ASM Alauddin Bhuiyan	77,260	34.3	−16.4
Independent	Abdullah Al Mamun	3,200	1.4	+1.1
People's Front	Md. Farid Uddin	379	0.2	N/A
Gano Forum	Sheikh Abdul Baten	280	0.1	N/A
Independent	Md. Shaha Uddin	232	0.1	N/A
Independent	Abul Bashar	232	0.1	N/A
Independent	Sajeda Arif	168	0.1	N/A
Majority		65,948	29.3	+24.3
Turnout		224,959	83.2	+11.8
AL gain from BNP				

General Election 2001: Comilla-5
Party	Candidate	Votes	%	±%
BNP	Mohammad Yunus	96,828	50.7	+21.5
AL	Abdul Matin Khasru	87,276	45.7	+6.8
IJOF	Tafazzal Hossain	6,034	3.2	N/A
Independent	Abdullah Al-Mamun	504	0.3	N/A
KSJL	Md. Delowar Hossain Bhuyan	188	0.1	N/A
Majority		9,552	5.0	−4.7
Turnout		190,830	71.4	+0.6
BNP gain from AL				

=== Elections in the 1990s ===
General Election June 1996: Comilla-5
Party	Candidate	Votes	%	±%
AL	Abdul Matin Khasru	51,184	38.9	−0.5
BNP	Abul Qashem	38,378	29.2	+7.1
JP(E)	Md. Ohidun Nabi	30,295	23.1	+6.6
Jamaat	Abdur Rouf	10,038	7.6	−7.2
NAP (Bhashani)	Md. Sirajul Islam	493	0.4	N/A
IOJ	A. B. M. Jaher Sharif	421	0.3	N/A
Zaker Party	Shamsul Alam	340	0.3	−0.6
Independent	Mohammad Yunus	268	0.2	N/A
Majority		12,806	9.7	−7.6
Turnout		131,417	70.8	+27.1
AL hold				

General Election 1991: Comilla-5
Party	Candidate	Votes	%	±%
AL	Abdul Matin Khasru	42,680	39.4	
BNP	Md. A. Latif	23,960	22.1	
JP(E)	Mohammad Yunus	17,852	16.5	
Jamaat	Abdur Rouf	16,048	14.8	
FP	A. Sattar Bhuiyan	5,924	5.5	
Zaker Party	Shamsul Alam	1,029	0.9	
Independent	Tafazzal Hossain	322	0.3	
Ganatantri Party	Abdul Khaleq	274	0.3	
Independent	Yusuf Sarwar	261	0.2	
Majority		18,720	17.3	
Turnout		108,350	43.7	
AL gain from JP(E)				
