= Anjum Sultana Sima =

Bangladeshi politician

Member of the Bangladesh Parliament for Reserved women's seat-10
- In office 20 February 2019 – 3 January 2024

Personal details
- Party: Awami League

Anjum Sultana Sima is an Awami League politician and a member of the Bangladesh Parliament from a reserved seat.

== Early life ==
Sultana was born on 28 September 1971. She has a B.Ed. degree. Her father, Afzal Khan, was a leader of the Awami League.

== Career ==
Sultana was nominated by the Awami League to contest the Comilla City mayoral election in 2017. She lost the election to Monirul Haque Sakku. She lost in part due to internal conflicts in the Awami League and lack of support from the local Awami League member of parliament, AKM Bahauddin Bahar.

In 2019, Sultana was elected to parliament from reserved seat as an Awami League candidate.
