= Abdul Matin Khasru =

Bangladeshi politician (1950–2021)

- আবদুল মতিন খসরু
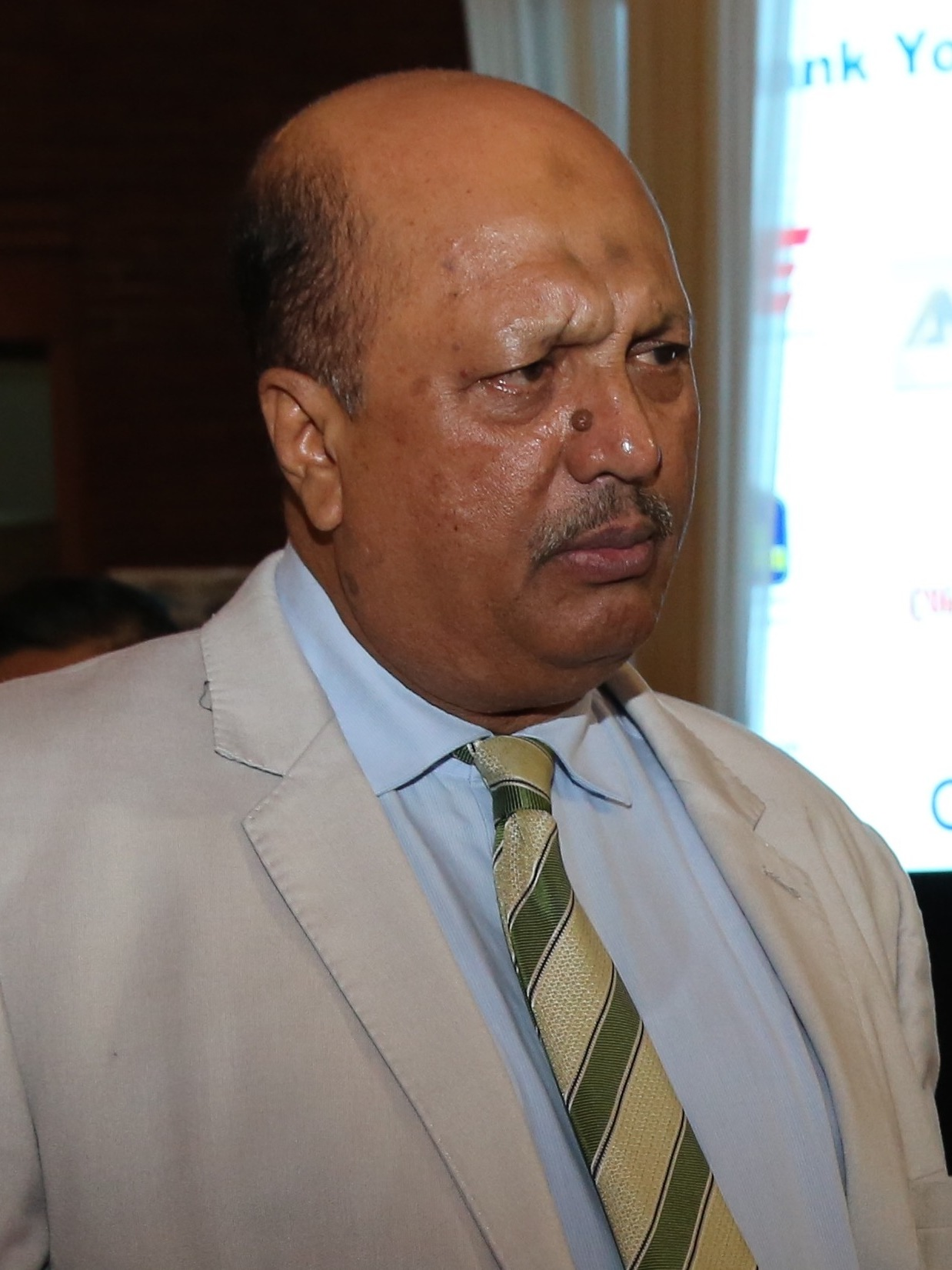
- Khasru in 2018

Minister of Law and Justice
- In office 14 January 1997 – 15 July 2001
- Prime Minister: Sheikh Hasina
- Preceded by: Mirza Ghulam Hafiz
- Succeeded by: Moudud Ahmed

Member of Parliament for Comilla-5
- In office 5 March 1991 – 24 November 1995
- Preceded by: Mohammad Yunus
- In office 14 July 1996 – 13 July 2001
- Preceded by: Mujibur Rahman
- In office 25 January 2009 – 14 April 2021
- Preceded by: Mohammad Yunus
- Succeeded by: Abul Hashim Khan

Personal details
- Born: 12 February 1950 Comilla District, East Bengal, Dominion of Pakistan
- Died: 14 April 2021 (aged 71) Dhaka, Bangladesh
- Party: Bangladesh Awami League
- Education: Comilla Victoria Government College
- Occupation: Lawyer, Politician

Abdul Matin Khasru (12 February 1950 – 14 April 2021) was a Bangladeshi lawyer and politician. He was a Jatiya Sangsad member representing the Comilla-5 constituency during 1991–1995, 1996–2001 and 2009–2021. He served in the first Hasina cabinet as Minister of Law and Justice from 1997 until 2001.

== Personal life ==
Khasru completed his SSC from Madhabpur High School in 1967. He got admitted to Comilla Victoria Government College and completed graduation under the University of Chittagong in 1970.Later, he admitted law in Comilla Law College and completed LL.B under the same university. They were four brothers and three sisters of whom he was the eldest. His father served in the Pakistan Army. His son Munem Wasif is a photojournalist who works at Agence Vu photography agency. Khasru was actively involved in politics since his student life. When he was a graduate student, the Bangladesh Liberation War started. Khasru fought in Burichang in Comilla District during the war.

== Career ==
Khasru started his legal practice at the District and Sessions Judges Court, Comilla in 1978. Later he started practicing in the High Court Division of the Bangladesh Supreme Court in 1982. He founded a law firm Abdul Matin Khasru & Associates in Dhaka.

Khasru was a senior advocate enrolled at the Supreme Court of Bangladesh. He was elected chairman of the executive committee of the Bangladesh Bar Council in 2015.

On 16 March 2021, he won the Bangladesh Supreme Court Bar Association Election 2021-2022 as the president from the White Panel backed by the Bangladesh Awami League. He died before taking charge.

=== Political career ===
Khasru was first elected to Parliament in 1991 from Comilla-5 on a nomination of Awami League defeating the incumbent, Mohammad Yunus of the Jatiya Party. He was re-elected in 1996.

Khasru stood for re-election in 2001 but lost to Mohammad Yunus who had then been nominated by Bangladesh Nationalist Party.

Khasru was elected to the parliament in 2008 on an Awami League nomination from Comilla-5. He headed the Parliamentarians' Caucus on Disability during the 9th parliamentary sessions. On 23 March 2011, he criticised the use of "vulgar" words by members of parliament in the Jatiya Sangshad.

Khasru was re-elected to the parliament in 2014 on an Awami League nomination from Comilla-5. In 2015, he was made the law secretary of Bangladesh Awami League. He became a member of the party's Presidium in 2017.

Khasru was re-elected to the parliament in 2018 on an Awami League nomination from Comilla-5. He was the president of the parliamentary standing committee on law. He summoned the Anti-Corruption Commission to parliament over its failure to take action against the former chairperson of BASIC Bank, Sheikh Abdul Hai Bacchu, on loans scams.

On 10 April 2020, Mosheur Mahfuz Babu, journalist and owner of Times of Cumilla, was arrested under the Digital Security Act for spreading "rumours" about Khasru. The website had reported Khasru's death. During the COVID-19 pandemic in Bangladesh, Khasru provided food aid to 5000 families in Comilla in April 2020.

== Death ==
Khasru died on 14 April 2021, after contracting COVID-19. He was under treatment at the Combined Military Hospital. He had a son Munem Wasif and a daughter.
