= Mujibur Rahman (Comilla politician) =

Bangladeshi politician

Mojibur Rahman

Member of Bangladesh Parliament
- In office February 1996 – June 2001
- Preceded by: Abdul Matin Khasru
- Succeeded by: Abdul Matin Khasru

Personal details
- Born: 1965 (age 60–61) Comilla Bangladesh
- Party: Bangladesh Nationalist Party

Mojibur Rahman is a Bangladesh Nationalist Party politician and a former member of parliament from Comilla-5.

== Career ==
Rahman was elected to parliament from Comilla-5 as a Bangladesh Nationalist Party candidate in February 1996.
