= Dharmasagar =

Dharmasagar may refer to:

- Dharmasagar, India, a town in Telangana, India
- Dharmasagar (pond), a man-made lake in Comilla, Bangladesh
