= Arfanul Haque Rifat =

Bangladeshi politician (1958–2023)

- আরফানুল হক রিফাত
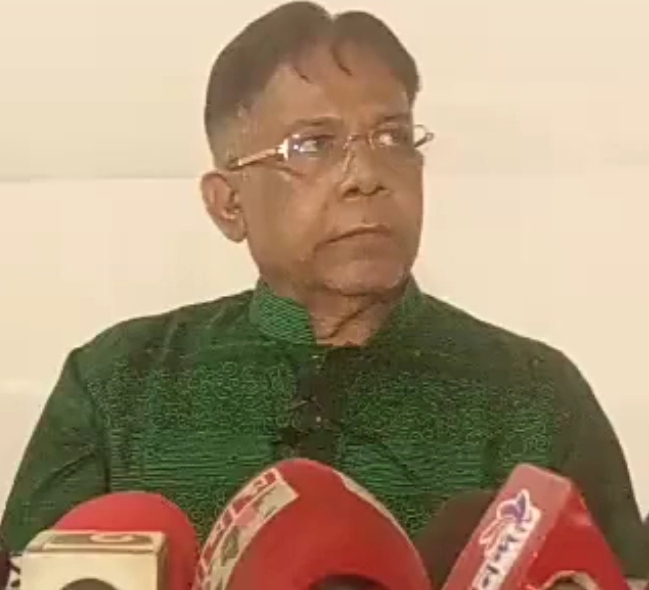
- Rifat in 2022

2nd Mayor of Comilla
- In office 16 June 2022 – 13 December 2023
- Preceded by: Monirul Haque Sakku
- Succeeded by: Tahseen Bahar Shuchona

Personal details
- Born: 1957/1958 Comilla, East Pakistan, Pakistan
- Died: 13 December 2023 (aged 65) Singapore
- Party: Bangladesh Awami League
- Education: Comilla Victoria Government College
- Occupation: Politician

Arfanul Haque Rifat (1957/1958 – 13 December 2023) was a Bangladeshi Awami League politician who was the 2nd mayor of Comilla City Corporation. Rifat served as the general secretary of Comilla city unit Awami League from 2017 until his death.

== Career ==
Rifat joined the Chhatra League in 1976 and became president of its Cumilla city unit after two years. He also served as a senior vice-president of the district unit of Jubo League. He served as District Football Association president since 2010. In 2022 Cumilla City Corporation election, Rifat defeated his closest rival former BNP leader Monirul Haque Sakku by a margin of only 343 votes. He took oath on 5 June 2022 as 2nd Mayor of Cumilla City Corporation (CUSIC).

== Controversies ==
Rifat was listed number one patron of drug dealers and smugglers in Cumilla according to a government agency which was listed by the prime minister's office in 2018, according to The Daily Star, Vorer Kagoj, Prothom Alo and other credible media. Though, the leaders of Awami League denied the allegations.

== Death ==
Rifat died in Mount Elizabeth Hospital, Singapore on 13 December 2023, at the age of 65.
