= Bharella =

Bharella ভারেল্লা
- Union
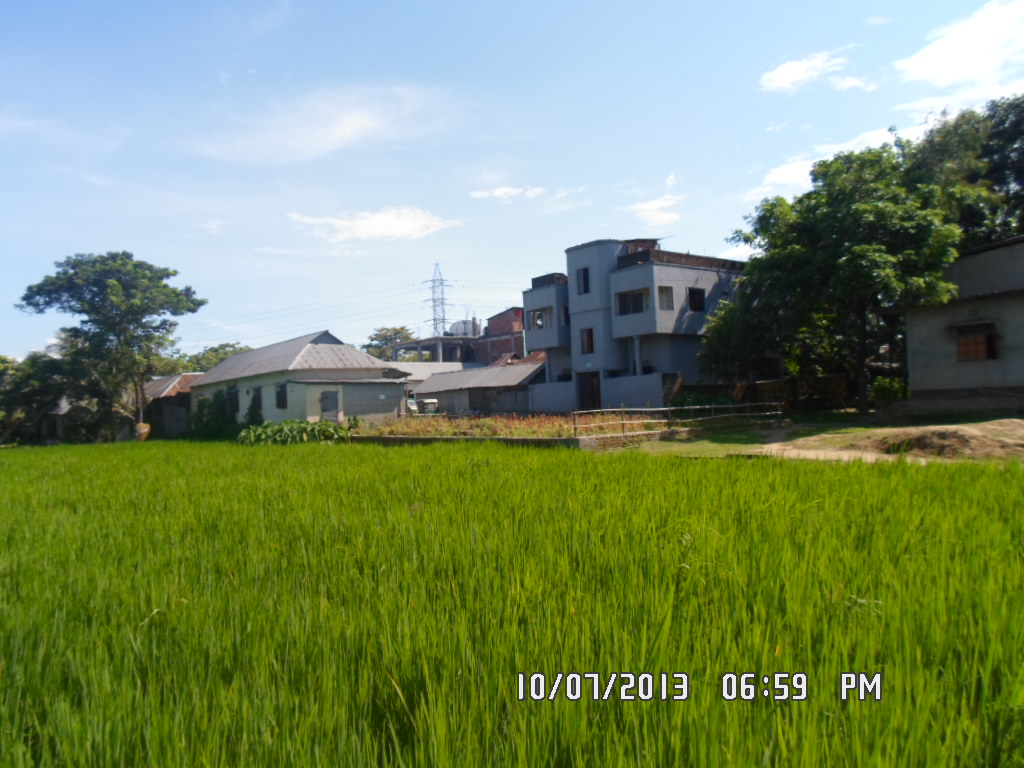
- A Snap of East Kangshanagar

- Location within Bangladesh
- Coordinates: 23.550612°N 91.056561°E
- Country: Bangladesh
- Division: Chittagong
- District: Comilla
- Upzilla: Burichang Upazila

Population (2013)
  - Total: 44,656
- Time zone: UTC+06:00 (BST)
- Website: varellaup.comilla.gov.bd

Bharella (Bengali: ভারেল্লা) is a union in Bangladesh. It is situated in the Comilla District of Chittagong Division. which is situated in Burichang Upazila. It stands beside the river of Gumti. Approximately 44656 people live in Bharella.

== Market ==
A market name Kangshanagar Bazar (কংশনগর বাজার) is situated here. It approximately 26 square kilometers size.

== Transport ==
Comilla-Sylhet Highway is a main road which by people of this city communicate with whole country. A road from Kangshanagar goes to Nimsha.

== Education ==
There are 3 educational institutions in Bharella. They are Bharella Shah Nuruddin High School, Bharella Government Primary School.

== Government offices ==
A branch of government bank Sonali Bank is situated here.
