= Tahseen Bahar Shuchona =

Bangladeshi politician

- তাহসিন বাহার সূচনা
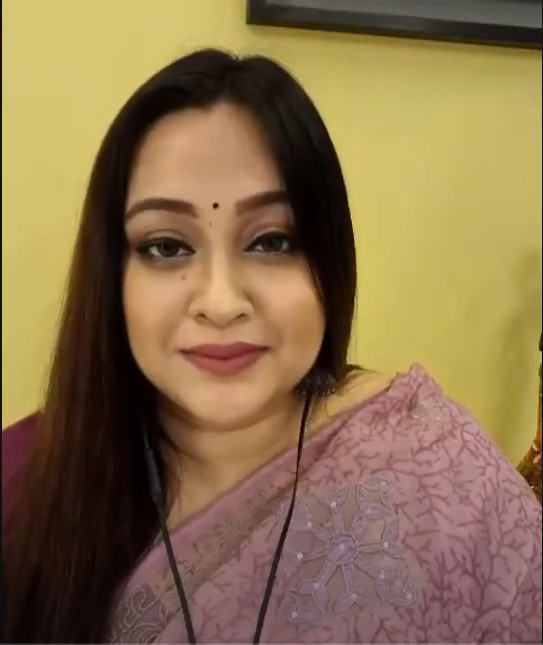
- Shuchona in 2021

3rd Mayor of Comilla
- In office 4 April 2024 – 5 August 2024
- Preceded by: Arfanul Haque Rifat
- Succeeded by: Saif Uddin Ahmed; as Administrator

Personal details
- Born: Comilla, Bangladesh
- Party: Bangladesh Awami League
- Parent: A. K. M. Bahauddin (father)
- Profession: Doctor

Tahseen Bahar Shuchona is a Bangladeshi politician and the third mayor of Cumilla City Corporation. A physician by profession, Suchona is the first female mayor of Cumilla City. She represents the Bangladesh Awami League.

== Early life and education ==
Suchona was born to A. K. M. Bahauddin Bahar and Meharun Nassa. Her father Bahar is a Bangladeshi politician from the Awami League and the incumbent member of parliament for Comilla-6. Suchona passed SSC from the Our Lady of Fatema Girls' High School, Cumilla and completed her HSC from the Comilla Govt. Women's College. She earned Bachelor of Medicine, Bachelor of Surgery degree from Eastern Medical College. She launched a social welfare organization namely 'Jagroto Manobikota'.

== Political career ==
Tahseen Bahar Suchona's involvement in politics began with her role as the organizing secretary of the Cumilla city unit of the Awami League. She later ran for the mayoral seat in the Cumilla City Corporation by-elections. On March 9, 2024, Suchona was elected as mayor, receiving 48,890 votes. After the fall of Awami League government during the 2024 Bangladesh quota reform movement, Suchona and her father fled to India and are reportedly staying in Kolkata under the protection of a local political leader. On 19 August 2024, the national government removed her from the mayoralty along with numerous other mayors and other elected local government officials.

== Awards ==
In 2021, Tahseen Bahar Suchona was honored with the JCI TOYP (Ten Outstanding Young Persons) Award by Junior Chamber International Bangladesh. Suchona's recognition was for her role as the general secretary of 'Jagroto Manobikota'.

== Controversies ==
Due to her questionable role throughout the July Massacre, several murder cases have been filed against Suchona and her father which are under investigation by the interim government of Muhammad Yunus. Suchona is accused of being involved in the torture of general protestors in Cumilla area during the 2024 Bangladesh quota reform movement.
