= 2017 Cumilla City Corporation election =

Local election in Bangladesh

2017 Comilla City Corporation election
- 30 March 2017
- Registered: 207,566 (▲22.62 pp)
- Turnout: 63.92% (▼10.23 pp)
	First party	Second party
Candidate	Monirul Haque Sakku	Anjum Sultana Sima
Party	BNP	AL
Popular vote	68,948	57,863
Percentage	51.96%	43.60%
Swing	▼0.44 pp	▲14.55 pp
Mayor before election
Monirul Haque Sakku
BNP
Elected Mayor
Monirul Haque Sakku
BNP
- Council election
- 30 March 2017; 36 seats in the Cumilla City Corporation
Party	Leader	Seats	+/–
AL	Anjum Sultana Sima	15	
BNP	Monirul Haque Sakku	8	
Jamaat	—	3	
Independent	—	10	
This lists parties that won seats. See the complete results below.

The 2017 Comilla City Corporation election was an election in Cumilla, Bangladesh, held on 30 March 2017 to elect the Mayor of Cumilla and councillors of the Cumilla City Corporation. This was the second election of the City Corporation since its establishment. In the election, incumbent BNP candidate Monirul Haque Sakku won by defeating his closest rival, Awami League candidate Anjum Sultana Sima.

== Mayor Election Result ==
Cumilla Mayoral Election 2017
Party	Candidate	Votes	%	±%
BNP	Monirul Haque Sakku	68,948	51.96	−0.44
AL	Anjum Sultana Sima	57,863	43.60	+14.55
Majority		11,085	8.36	New
Turnout		132,689	63.92	−10.23
Registered electors		207,566		
BNP hold				
