= Shahebabad =

Coordinates: 23°36′16″N 91°06′22″E

Shahebabad (Bengali: শাহেদাবাদ) is a village, the headquarters of Shahebabad Union under Brahmanpara Upazila of Comilla District, Bangladesh. The other villages in the union parishad are Chhatiani and Tatera to the north, Nagarpar to the east, Takai to the south, and Jiran Naya Para to the west.

Previously it was known as Bolda. Soon after Bangladesh period it was renamed to Shahebabad.

According to the 2011 Bangladesh census, Shahebabad had 1,304 households and a population of 7,517. Islam was the majority religion (98.1% of the population). Hindus were the second-largest religious community (1.9% of the population). 12.8% of the population was under the age of 5. The literacy rate (age 7 and over) was 51.6%, compared to the national average of 51.8%.

Shahebabad Degree College, founded in 1970, is the only college. Shahebabad Latif Ismail High School is the only secondary school.
