= Comilla Airport =

Unused domestic airport in Bangladesh

- IATA: CLA; ICAO: VGCM

Summary
- Airport type: Public
- Serves: Cumilla
- Location: Bangladesh
- Elevation AMSL: 26 ft (7.9 m)
- Coordinates: 23°26′12.5″N 91°11′23.5″E
- Interactive map of Comilla Airport

Runways
Direction	Length		Surface
Direction	ft	m	Surface
16/34	3,380	1,030	Asphalt
- Source: Landings.com

Comilla Airport (IATA: CLA, ICAO: VGCM) is an unused airport located near the city of Cumilla, in eastern Bangladesh.

== History ==
Comilla Airport was built by the United States in 1941−1942 during World War II. After the war, the airport catered to domestic flights. Pakistan International Airlines flew from Comilla to Dacca and Chittagong, and after independence Biman Bangladesh operated flights to Dhaka. The airport became defunct in 1976. Air service resumed in 1994 but lasted two weeks due to poor demand.

== See also ==
- List of airports in Bangladesh
