= Zaherite =

Sulfate mineral

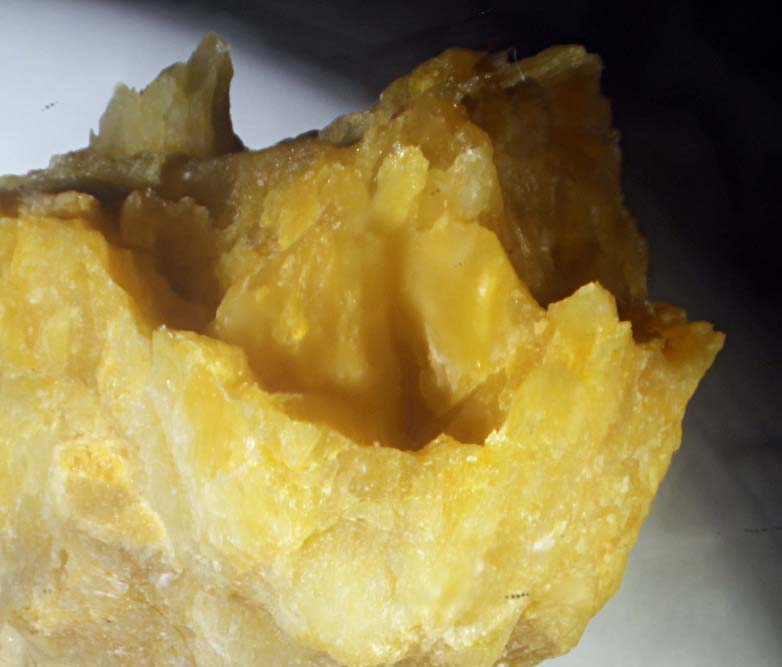

General
- Category: Minerals
- Formula: Al_{12}(OH)_{26}(SO_{4})_{5}·20H_{2}O
- IMA symbol: Zah
- Crystal system: Triclinic

Identification
- Mohs scale hardness: 3.5
- Luster: Pearly, earthy
- Specific gravity: 2.007

Zaherite is a mineral, a complex sulfate of aluminium, formula Al_{12}(OH)_{26}(SO_{4})_{5}·20H_{2}O. It was discovered in the Salt range, Punjab, Pakistan by M. A. Zaher of the Bangladesh Geological Survey after whom it is named in 1977. This mineral would be extremely soluble in water and unlikely to persist anywhere except in the most arid of environments. It spontaneously, and reversibly dehydrates around room temperature. Its color is white to blue-green.

== See also ==
- List of minerals
- List of minerals named after people
