= Bharella Shah Nuruddin High School =

Location
- Kangshanagar-Nimser Rd, Bharella; Bangladesh
- Coordinates: 23.5420°N 91.0609°E

Information
- Type: Public
- Established: 1962
- School district: Comilla
- Enrollment: 1,500

Bharella Shah Nuruddin High School (Bengali: ভারেল্লা শাহ নুরুদ্দিন উচ্চ বিদ্যালয়) is a secondary school located in Bharella, Burichang Upazila of Comilla District, Bangladesh. It was established in 1962 to eradicate illiteracy from the village. Almost 1,500 students study there.

== History ==
In October 2016, an eighth grade student drank pesticide at home after being beaten with a cane in front of her classmates at the school. She died on the way to Dhaka Medical College Hospital.

== See also ==
- Education in Bangladesh
- Board of Intermediate and Secondary Education, Comilla
- List of schools in Bangladesh
