= Mayor of Cumilla =

Bangladesh local government official

- Incumbent; Yusuf Molla Tipu since 14 March 2026
- Cumilla City Corporation
- Style: Honourable (formal)
- Type: Council Leader
- Member of: Cumilla City Corporation
- Seat: Nagar Bhaban, Cumilla
- Appointer: Electorate of Cumilla
- Term length: Five years, renewable
- Constituting instrument: The City Corporation act, 2009
- Inaugural holder: Monirul Haque Sakku
- Formation: 10 July 2011; 15 years ago
- Salary: ৳150000 (US$1,200) per month (incl. allowances)
- Website: cucc.gov.bd

The Mayor of Cumilla is the chief elected executive of the Cumilla City Corporation in Comilla, Bangladesh. The Mayor’s office oversees civic services, manages public properties, and coordinates the functions of various government agencies within the city. In addition, the Mayor is responsible for enforcing city corporation regulations and state laws.

The Mayor's office is located in Nagar Bhaban; it has jurisdiction over all 27 wards of Cumilla City.

== List of officeholders ==
=== Political parties ===
Bangladesh Nationalist Party
Bangladesh Awami League

=== Other factions ===
Independent

=== Status ===
Acting Mayor and Administrator

No.	Portrait	Officeholder (birth–death)	Election	Term of office			Designation	Political party	Reference
No.	Portrait	Officeholder (birth–death)	Election	From	To	Period	Designation	Political party	Reference
1		Monirul Haque Sakku	2012; 2017	5 January 2012	16 May 2022	10 years, 131 days	Mayor	Bangladesh Nationalist Party	
–		Dr. Safiqul Islam	–	17 May 2022	5 July 2022	49 days	Administrator	Independent	
2		Arfanul Haque Rifat; (1958–2023)	2022	5 July 2022	13 December 2023	1 year, 161 days	Mayor	Bangladesh Awami League	
3		Dr. Tahseen Bahar Shuchona	2024^	4 April 2024	19 August 2024	137 days	Mayor	Bangladesh Awami League	
–		Saif Uddin Ahmed	–	19 August 2024	25 September 2025	1 year, 37 days	Administrator	Independent	
–		Md. Shah Alam	–	25 September 2025	13 March 2026	169 days	Administrator	Independent	
–		Yusuf Molla Tipu	–	14 March 2026	Incumbent	177 days	Administrator	Bangladesh Nationalist Party	

== Elections ==
=== Election Result 2024 ===
Comilla Mayoral Election 2024
Party	Candidate	Votes	%	±%
AL	Tahseen Bahar Shuchona	48,890	51.95	+14.61
Independent	Monirul Haque Sakku	26,897	28.58	−8.50
Independent	Nizam Uddin Kaiser	13,155	13.98	New
Independent	Noor ur Rahman Mahmud	5,173	5.50	New
Majority		21,993	23.37	+23.11
Turnout		94,115	38.82	▼19.80pp
Registered electors		242,458		
AL hold				

=== Election result 2022 ===
Comilla Mayoral Election 2022
Party	Candidate	Votes	%	±%
AL	Arfanul Haque Rifat	50,310	37.34	−6.25
Independent	Monirul Haque Sakku	49,967	37.08	−14.89
Independent	Nizam Uddin Kaiser	29,099	21.60	New
IAB	Rashedul Islam	3,040	2.26	New
Independent	Kamrul Ahsan Babul	2,329	1.73	New
Majority		343	0.25	−8.13
Turnout		134,776	58.62	▼5.38pp
Registered electors		229,920		
AL gain from BNP				

=== Election result 2017 ===
Comilla Mayoral Election 2017
Party	Candidate	Votes	%	±%
BNP	Monirul Haque Sakku	68,948	51.97	−0.44
AL	Anjum Sultana Sima	57,863	43.59	+14.53
Majority		11,085	8.38	−13.37
Turnout		132,690	64.00	▼10.20pp
Registered electors		207,566		
BNP hold				

=== Election result 2012 ===
Comilla Mayoral Election 2012
Party	Candidate	Votes	%	±%
BNP	Monirul Haque Sakku	65,777	52.41	New
AL	Afzal Khan	36,471	29.06	New
Independent	Nurul Rahman Tanim	8,514	6.78	New
JP(E)	Mohammad Selim	7,961	6.34	New
Majority		29,306	23.35	New
Turnout		125,522	74.2	New
Registered electors		169,279		
BNP win (new seat)				
