= Cumilla City Corporation =

Local governing body of Comilla, Bangladesh

Coordinates: 23.467212°N 91.176049°E

Cumilla City Corporation কুমিল্লা সিটি কর্পোরেশন
- Emblem of the city corporation

Type
- Type: City Corporation

History
- Founded: July 10, 2011; 15 years ago
- New session started: 15 September 2025

Leadership
- Mayor: Vacant since 19 August 2024
- Administrator: Yusuf Molla Tipu, BNP since 14 March 2026
- Deputy Mayor: Vacant since 19 August 2024
- Chief Executive Officer: Mohammad Mamun since 15 September 2025

Structure
- Seats: Vacant seats 36 councillors
- Length of term: Up to five years

Elections
- Voting system: First past the post
- First election: 5 January 2012
- Last election: 9 March 2024
- Next election: TBD

Meeting place
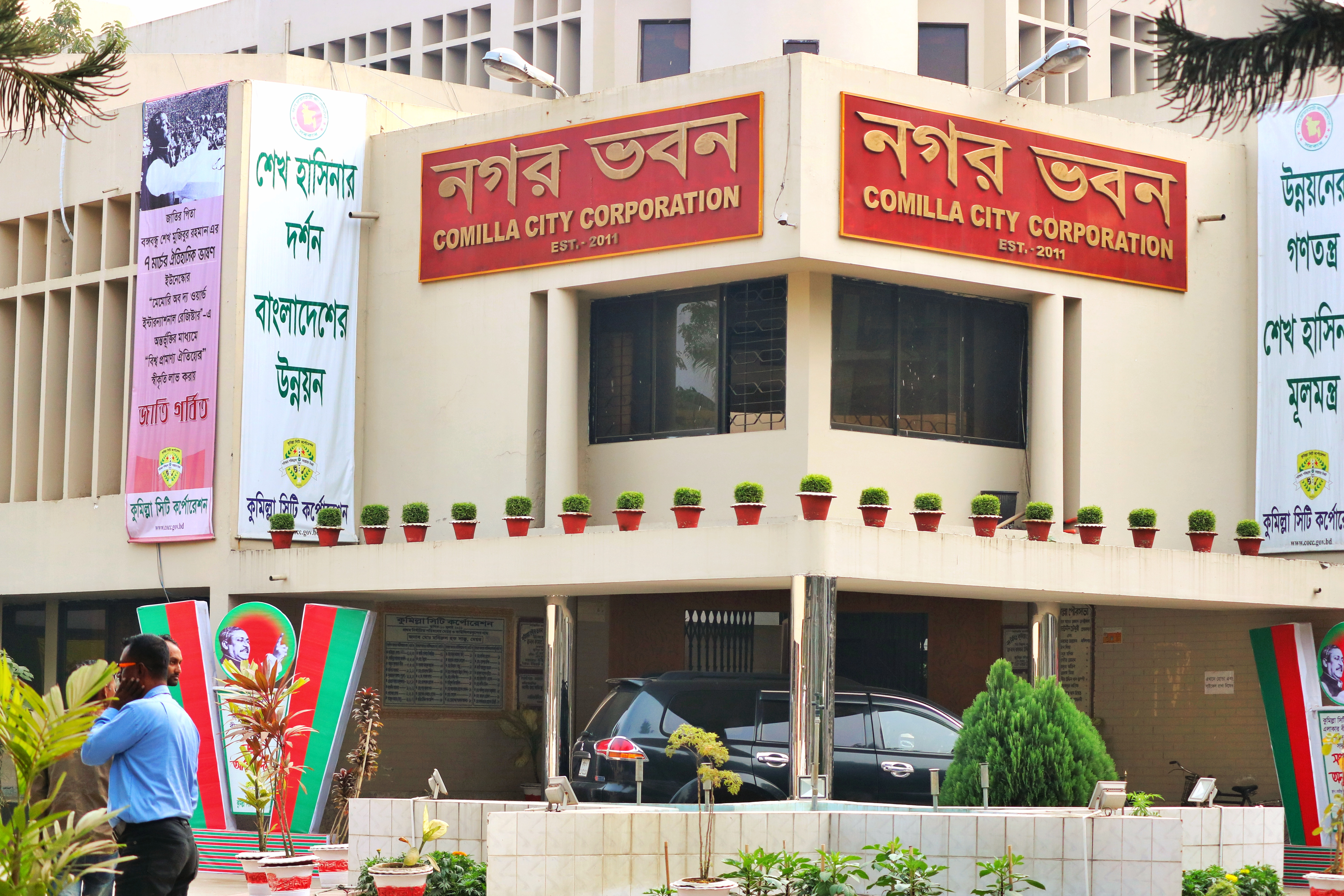
- Nagar Bhaban, Comilla

Website
- cocc.portal.gov.bd

Comilla City Corporation mahallah geocode map

Cumilla City Corporation (Bengali: কুমিল্লা সিটি কর্পোরেশন) is a local government authority responsible for administering all civic services in the Comilla, the city of Bangladesh. The COCC government is elected by popular vote every five years. The corporation is headed by a mayor, who oversees a council consisting of 36 councillors representing different wards of the city. The functions and powers of the COCC are defined under the provisions of the City Corporation Act, 2009.

The corporation covers an area of over 53.84 square kilometers in the Comilla District. The body was known as Comilla Municipality previously, until it obtained the city corporation status by a ministry of local government declaration on 10 July 2011.

== History ==
The Comilla municipality was formed in the mid-1890s and the city remained as a municipality for over 125 years though the number of the population has been rising with time. An administrative proposition, issued from the Comilla district administration, was passed on 20 August 2009. The ministry of local government meeting on 4 March 2011 declared to turn at least four of the populated municipalities into city corporations, largely bringing Comilla as a suggestion as one of the contenders. An administrative move was made on 23 June 2011 abolishing the Comilla Municipality as the final step to introduce the administrative body as a city corporation. Later on 10 July 2011, a ministry gazette named the Comilla Municipality as the new Comilla City Corporation.

The city corporation is run by a joint staff of elected public representatives and government officials. Officials both come from departmental recruitment and the administrative cadre service of the country. The city corporation has 37 members, containing 27 councilors, 9 woman councilors led by the mayor. Bangladesh Election Commission is constituted to oversee city corporation polls, which sits in the office for a five-year tenure.

The first ever mayoral election of the city corporation was held on 5 January 2012, has an area of 200 kilometers, elected the municipality's Monirul Haque Sakku as its new mayor, 27 councilors and 9 woman councilors from 27 wards. 2024 Comilla City Corporation by-election

== Functions and Services ==
The Cumilla City Corporation (COCC) is responsible for administering the city and ensuring the provision of essential infrastructure and public services. Its functions include urban planning, transport management, healthcare, education, waste management, water supply, and security. Through these services, COCC aims to improve the quality of life for residents and promote sustainable urban development.

Departments of Cumilla City Corporation
#	Departments	Functions / Services
1	Office of the Mayor	Executive administration; city governance; supervision of all COCC services
2	Chief Executive Office	Departmental coordination; service implementation monitoring
3	Administration And Establishment	HR management; staff recruitment; service delivery monitoring
4	Finance and Accounts	Budget preparation; financial planning; payment processing; accounts management; internal audit
5	Engineering	Road-cutting permission; building design approval; contractor registration; land demarcation certificates
6	Urban Planning and Development	Road, drain, bridge, culvert and footpath development; land development; planned residential areas; city beautification
7	Electricity	Installation and maintenance of street lights; lamp-post management; city illumination
8	Transportation and Communication	Urban transport management; traffic & parking control; emergency transport; corpse handling; bus terminal management; road roller & ambulance services
9	Waste Management and Cleaning	Solid waste collection and disposal; street cleaning; drain clearing; mosquito control; landfill management
10	Health	Hospital & clinic management; maternal & child immunization; vitamin A campaigns; midwifery and health technology training
11	Registrar	Birth & death certificates; nationality, inheritance & character certificates
12	Education	Management of schools, madrasas, Sanskrit tolls, kindergartens, technical institutes; adult education; teacher training; cultural & theatre institutes
13	Water Supply and Sewerage	Clean water supply and sewerage management in the entire city corporation.
14	Revenue	Trade license issuance & renewal; holding tax collection; shop/market allotment; lease and asset management
15	Security and Law and Order	City security; joint operations with Cumilla District Police; CCTV installation and monitoring
16	Magistracy	Arbitration-based case settlement; mobile courts; anti-adulteration drives
17	Housing and Public Works	Distribution and maintenance of residential plots and flats
18	Cultural and Social Development	National Day celebrations; charity programs; and children’s park and playground construction & maintenance
19	Environmental Protection	Pollution control; climate change mitigation; urban greening; tree plantation
20	Religious Welfare	Support for Eid, Puja, and religious events; Qurbani market permissions; land allocation for religious events

== Ward and councillor list ==
#	Ward	Councillor	Party
1	Ward-1	Vacant	TBD
2	Ward-2	Vacant	TBD
3	Ward-3	Vacant	TBD
4	Ward-4	Vacant	TBD
5	Ward-5	Vacant	TBD
6	Ward-6	Vacant	TBD
7	Ward-7	Vacant	TBD
8	Ward-8	Vacant	TBD
9	Ward-9	Vacant	TBD
10	Ward-10	Vacant	TBD
11	Ward-11	Vacant	TBD
12	Ward-12	Vacant	TBD
13	Ward-13	Vacant	TBD
14	Ward-14	Vacant	TBD
15	Ward-15	Vacant	TBD
16	Ward-16	Vacant	TBD
17	Ward-17	Vacant	TBD
18	Ward-18	Vacant	TBD
19	Ward-19	Vacant	TBD
20	Ward-20	Vacant	TBD
21	Ward-21	Vacant	TBD
22	Ward-22	Vacant	TBD
23	Ward-23	Vacant	TBD
24	Ward-24	Vacant	TBD
25	Ward-25	Vacant	TBD
26	Ward-26	Vacant	TBD
27	Ward-27	Vacant	TBD
Reserved Women's Councillor
28	Reserved women's seat-1	Vacant	TBD
29	Reserved women's seat-2	Vacant	TBD
30	Reserved women's seat-3	Vacant	TBD
31	Reserved women's seat-4	Vacant	TBD
32	Reserved women's seat-5	Vacant	TBD
33	Reserved women's seat-6	Vacant	TBD
34	Reserved women's seat-7	Vacant	TBD
35	Reserved women's seat-8	Vacant	TBD
36	Reserved women's seat-9	Vacant	TBD

== List of mayors ==
Political parties

- Bangladesh Nationalist Party
- Bangladesh Awami League

Other factions

- Independent

Status

- Acting Mayor and Administrator

No.	Portrait	Officeholder (birth–death)	Election	Term of office			Designation	Political party	Reference
No.	Portrait	Officeholder (birth–death)	Election	From	To	Period	Designation	Political party	Reference
1		Monirul Haque Sakku	2012; 2017	5 January 2012	16 May 2022	10 years, 131 days	Mayor	Bangladesh Nationalist Party	
–		Dr. Safiqul Islam	–	17 May 2022	5 July 2022	49 days	Administrator	Independent	
2		Arfanul Haque Rifat; (1958–2023)	2022	5 July 2022	13 December 2023	1 year, 161 days	Mayor	Bangladesh Awami League	
3		Dr. Tahseen Bahar Shuchona	2024^	4 April 2024	19 August 2024	137 days	Mayor	Bangladesh Awami League	
–		Saif Uddin Ahmed	–	19 August 2024	25 September 2025	1 year, 37 days	Administrator	Independent	
–		Md. Shah Alam	–	25 September 2025	13 March 2026	169 days	Administrator	Independent	
–		Yusuf Molla Tipu	–	14 March 2026	Incumbent	130 days	Administrator	Bangladesh Nationalist Party	

== Past elections ==
=== Election Result 2024 ===
Comilla Mayoral Election 2024
Party	Candidate	Votes	%	±%
AL	Tahseen Bahar Shuchona	48,890	51.95	+14.61
Independent	Monirul Haque Sakku	26,897	28.58	−8.50
Independent	Nizam Uddin Kaiser	13,155	13.98	New
Independent	Noor ur Rahman Mahmud	5,173	5.50	New
Majority		21,993	23.37	+23.11
Turnout		94,115	38.82	▼19.80pp
Registered electors		242,458		
AL hold				

=== Election result 2022 ===
Comilla Mayoral Election 2022
Party	Candidate	Votes	%	±%
AL	Arfanul Haque Rifat	50,310	37.34	−6.25
Independent	Monirul Haque Sakku	49,967	37.08	−14.89
Independent	Nizam Uddin Kaiser	29,099	21.60	New
IAB	Rashedul Islam	3,040	2.26	New
Independent	Kamrul Ahsan Babul	2,329	1.73	New
Majority		343	0.25	−8.13
Turnout		134,776	58.62	▼5.38pp
Registered electors		229,920		
AL gain from BNP				

=== Election result 2017 ===
Comilla Mayoral Election 2017
Party	Candidate	Votes	%	±%
BNP	Monirul Haque Sakku	68,948	51.97	−0.44
AL	Anjum Sultana Sima	57,863	43.59	+14.53
Majority		11,085	8.38	−13.37
Turnout		132,690	64.00	▼10.20pp
Registered electors		207,566		
BNP hold				

=== Election result 2012 ===
Comilla Mayoral Election 2012
Party	Candidate	Votes	%	±%
BNP	Monirul Haque Sakku	65,777	52.41	New
AL	Afzal Khan	36,471	29.06	New
Independent	Nurul Rahman Tanim	8,514	6.78	New
JP(E)	Mohammad Selim	7,961	6.34	New
Majority		29,306	23.35	New
Turnout		125,522	74.2	New
Registered electors		169,279		
BNP win (new seat)				

== See also ==
- List of city corporations in Bangladesh
- Comilla Division
