= Abdul Kuddas Makhan =

Bangladeshi politician (1947–1994)

Abdul Kuddus Makhan

Member of Bangladesh Parliament
- In office 1973–1979
- Succeeded by: Habib Ullah Khan

Personal details
- Political party: Bangladesh Awami League

Abdul Kuddus Makhan (1 July 1947 – 10 February 1994) was a Bangladesh Awami League politician and a member of parliament for Comilla-5.

== Early life ==
Makhan was born on 1 July 1947 in Brahmanbaria, East Bengal, British India. He studied at Brahmanbaria College and Dhaka University. He was a leader of the Six point movement.

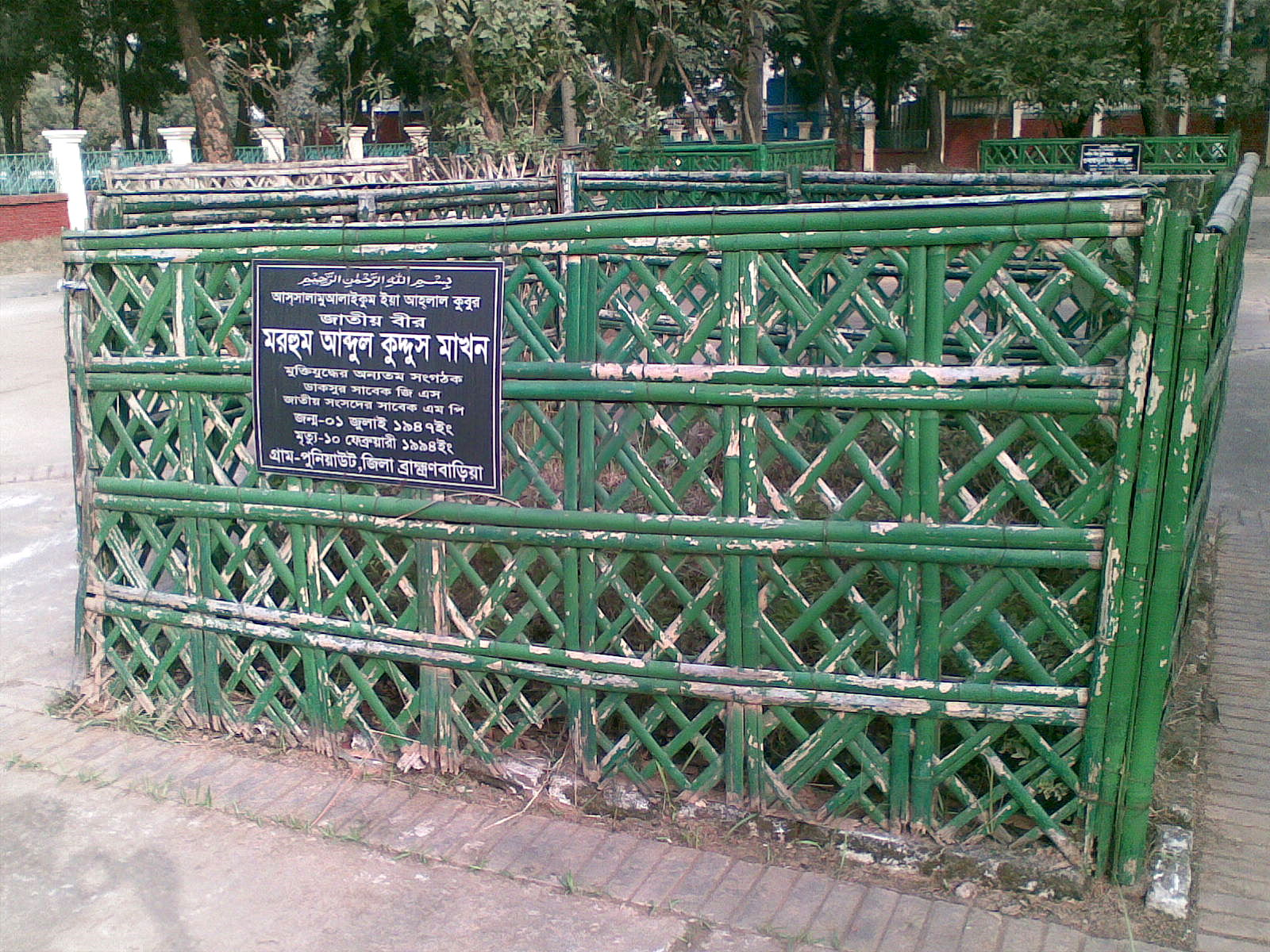
Grave of Abdul Kuddus Makhan at Martyred Intellectuals Graveyard, Mirpur

== Career ==
Makhan served in the Jubo League as a presidium member. He was elected to parliament from Comilla-5 as a Bangladesh Awami League candidate in 1973. From 1992 to 1994 he was a member of the Awami League central working committee.

== Death ==
Makhan died on 10 February 1994.
