= M. A. Zaher (geologist) =

Bangladeshi geologist

Mohammed Abduz Zaher
- Born: c. 1932; Bancharampur, Bangladesh
- Died: 27 August 2017 (aged 85); Dhaka, Bangladesh
- Occupation: Geologist

Mohammed Abduz Zaher (c. 1932 – 27 August 2017) was a Bangladeshi geologist. He was the director general of Geological Survey of Bangladesh.

== Biography ==
Abduz Zaher described a new mineral in his M.S. Thesis of Michigan Technological University in 1969 that he investigated from Salt Range, Pakistan. The mineral was named after him as zaherite by International Mineralogical Association in 1977. He was the director general of Geological Survey of Bangladesh. He was a teacher of Dhaka University's soil science department too. He provided technical and strategic support to the freedom fighters during the Liberation War of Bangladesh.

Abduz Zaher died on 27 August 2017 at the age of 85.

== Selected publications ==
- A. Zaher, M. (1963). Peat deposit of Kola Moza, Khulna, East Pakistan
- Ahmed, W., and A. Zaher, M., (1965). Paharpur Gondwana coalfield and subsurface geology of Rajshahi Division, East Pakistan
- A. Zaher, M. (1969). A study of the clays of the Salt Range and Kala-Chitta Hills, West Pakistan
- Rahman, M. M. and A. Zaher, M., (1980). Jamalganj Coal - Its Quantity, Quality and Minability
- A. Zaher, M., and Anisur Rahman, (1980). Prospects and investigations for minerals in the northern part of Bangladesh, in Petroleum and mineral resources of Bangladesh
- A. Zaher, M., Alam, M. K., Arifur Rahman, Q. M. and Chowdhury, S. I. (1986). Subsurface Geology of the Limestone Deposits of Jaypurhat Area, Jaypurhat District, Bangladesh
