= Dharmasagar (pond) =

Large pond in Bangladesh

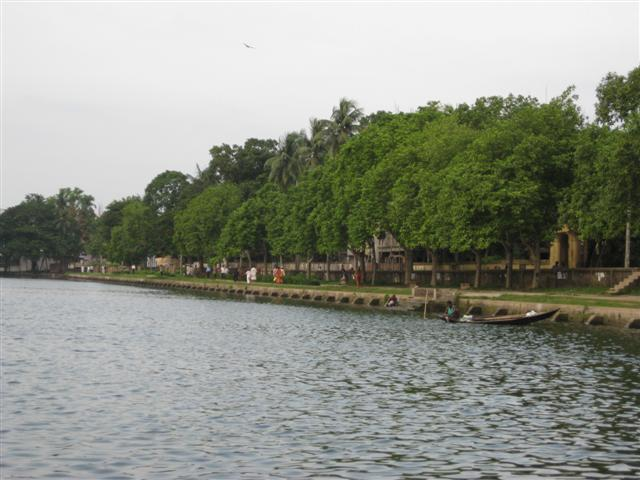
- The lake in 2009
- Interactive map of Dharmasagar
- Location: Comilla
- Coordinates: 23°27′52″N 91°10′46″E
- Type: Reservoirs, Dighi
- Basin countries: Bangladesh
- Max. length: 375.46 m (1,231.8 ft)
- Max. width: 237.42 m (778.9 ft)
- Surface area: 23.18 acres (9.38 ha)
- Average depth: 3.6 m (12 ft)
- Max. depth: 5.2 m (17 ft)
- Residence time: about 600 years
- Surface elevation: 15 m (49 ft)
- Settlements: Comilla

Dharmasagar is a man-made water body in Comilla, Bangladesh. The pond was dug by the Tripura king Dharma Manikya I in 1458.

Sachin Dev Burman and Kazi Nazrul Islam were here during their time in Comilla. There is memorial center of Nazrul beside the pond.

To facilitate the local habitat with mineral water ‘Dharmashagar’ was established, which is considered one of the earliest evidences of urban water heritage of Bangladesh. Since the establishment, this water body has been the centre of the social & economic growth of the city. Cumilla, like all other major cities in Bangladesh, has been dealing with the erosion of its distinctive aspect because of fast unplanned growth, which has harmed the city's primordial urban fabric and identity. Since then, governmental and non-governmental organizations have worked to protect and conserve the Dighi environment as a distinct entity.

Dharmashagar is defined as the centre of Cumilla city. From the beginning, the central recreational zones of the city were developed based on the east bank of this water body, by the time it was divided & converted into a stadium and central Eidgah. The north bank is the administrative territory of the city. The walk running beside the west bank of the Dighi, is the only open space in the city. However, private residential properties entirely block the South bank and strict public access. Unplanned development near the bank has ruined the waterfront character created a negative space behind it.

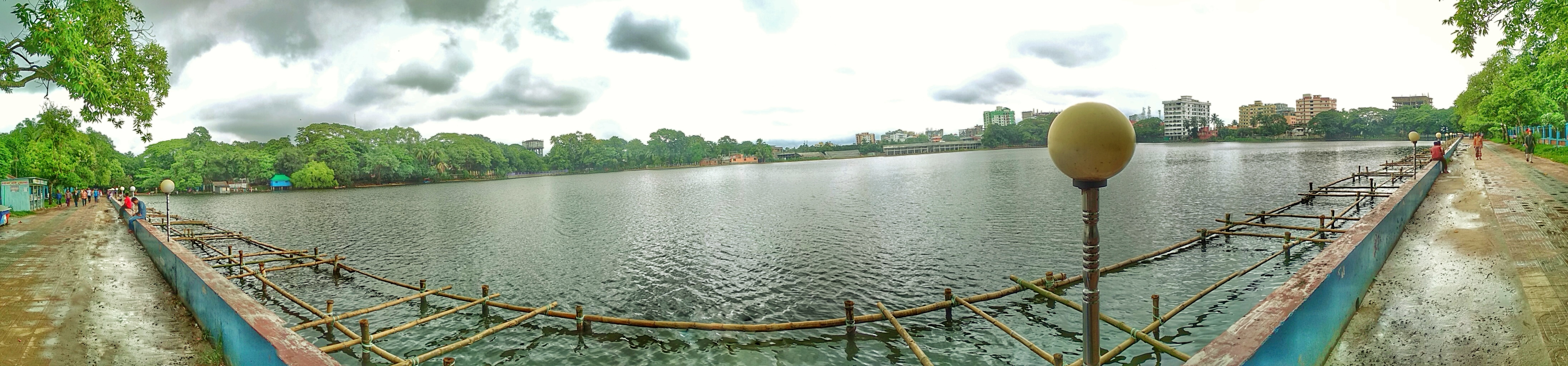
Panorama of the Dharmasagar pond, taken in 2017

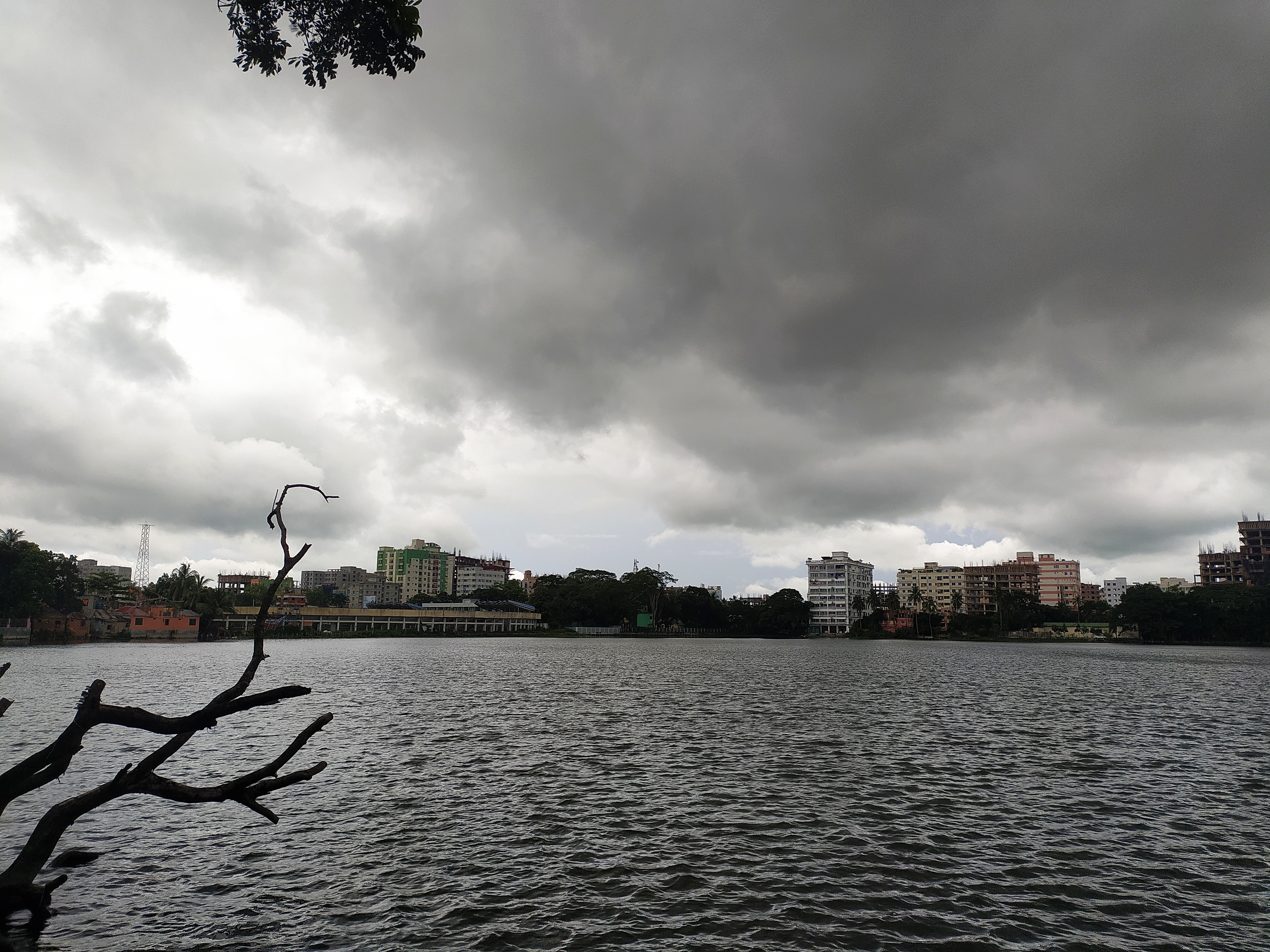
water view from south (2020)
