= Mohammad Yunus (Bangladeshi politician) =

Bangladeshi politician (1944–2021)

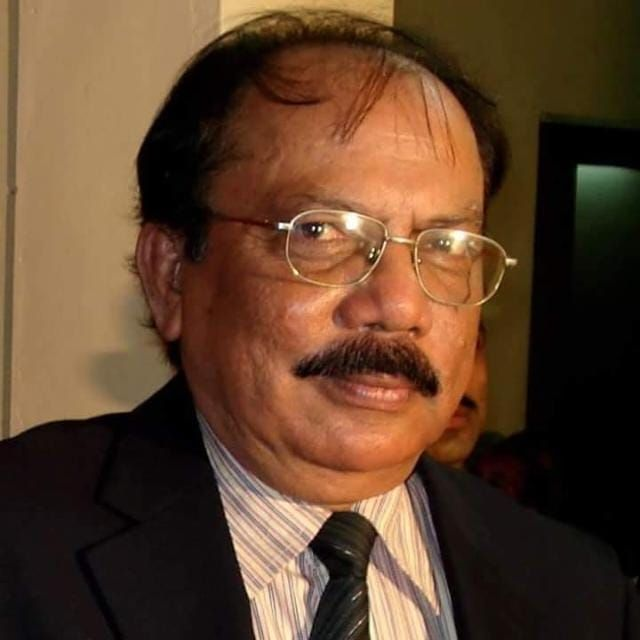

Member of Parliament for Comilla-14
- In office 7 March 1973 – 1976

Member of Parliament for Comilla-5
- In office 7 May 1986 – 6 December 1990
- In office 1 October 2001 – 26 October 2006

Personal details
- Born: 4 July 1944 Comilla District
- Died: 27 March 2021 (aged 76) Dhaka
- Party: Bangladesh Nationalist Party
- Education: University of Dhaka

Mohammad Yunus (4 July 1944 – 27 March 2021) was a politician of the Bangladesh Nationalist Party and MP for the Comilla-14 and Comilla-5 constituencies.

== Birth and early life ==
Yunus was born on 4 July 1944 in Gobinath village of Piryatrapur union in Burichang upazila of Comilla district.

== Education ==
Yunus completed his bachelor's degree in Mathematics from the University of Dhaka, graduating with first class honours.

== Career ==
Yunus was an organizer of the liberation war. He played an active role in political activities of the time, including the 6-point movement, the language movement, and participation in the war of independence of Bangladesh.

He served as a lecturer in the Department of Mathematics at the University of Dhaka, where he taught courses in Applied Mathematics and Theoretical Physics. He also delivered classes at University of Cambridge and University College London in the United Kingdom, as well as at the University of Chittagong and BUET (Bangladesh), teaching similar courses.

In the first parliamentary elections of 1973, he won the then Comilla-14 seat as a candidate of the Bangladesh Awami League.

As a candidate of the Jatiya Party, he won the third Jatiya Sangsad election of 1986 and the fourth Jatiya Sangsad election of 1988 from the Comilla-5 constituency.

He was elected a member of parliament from the Bangladesh Nationalist Party in the 8th parliamentary election of 2001.

He was defeated in the fifth national election of 1991 by contesting on behalf of Jatiya Party and in the national election of 2018 by BNP.

== Death ==
Mohammad Yunus died on 27 March 2021.
