= M. A. Zaher (politician) =

Bangladeshi politician

- এম এ জাহের

Member of Parliament for Comilla-5
- In office 30 January 2024 – 6 August 2024
- Preceded by: Abul Hashem Khan

Personal details
- Born: 15 January 1966 (age 60) Comilla, East Pakistan, Pakistan
- Party: Bangladesh Awami League
- Occupation: Politician, businessman

M. A. Zaher is a Bangladeshi politician. He is a former Jatiya Sangsad member representing the Comilla-5 constituency.

== Political life ==
M A Zaher was nominated as a member of parliament as a candidate of Independent from Comilla-5 constituency in 2024 twelfth national parliament election. He lost his position as a Member of Parliament in 2024 following the dissolution of the National Parliament through the Non-cooperation movement.
