= Monirul Haque Sakku =

Bangladeshi politician

- মনিরুল হক সাক্কু

1st Mayor of Comilla
- In office 5 January 2012 – 15 May 2022
- Preceded by: Post established
- Succeeded by: Arfanul Haque Rifat

Personal details
- Born: Comilla, East Pakistan
- Party: Bangladesh Nationalist Party
- Spouse: Afroza Jesmin
- Children: Sunzida Haque
- Occupation: Politician

Monirul Haque Sakku is a Bangladeshi politician and the first and former mayor of the Cumilla City Corporation as a candidate of the Bangladesh Nationalist Party. On 19 May 2022, he was expelled from the BNP for breaching party discipline and again joined the BNP in 2023. He was pourashva mayor before 2012. He has a daughter, Sunzida Haque.

== Career ==
On 7 January 2008, the Anti-Corruption Commission sued Sakku and his wife for illegal wealth. He was charged on 4 February 2016, but his wife's, Afroza Jasmine's, was dropped. On 22 November 2017, a trial court found him innocent of all charges.

On 5 January 2012, Sakku was elected mayor of Comilla on a nomination of the Citizens Committee. He is a former president of the Comilla City unit of the Bangladesh Nationalist Party. He had been expelled from the party.

Sakku was nominated by the Bangladesh Nationalist Party to contest the mayoral election in Comilla in 2017. He was re-elected mayor on 31 March 2017. A correspondent of The Daily Star reported seeing some activists of the Awami League stuff ballots for their candidate. His candidacy was supported by Bangladesh Jamaat-e-Islami.

He was removed from the BNP national executive committee in December 2021.
