= Brahmanpara Upazila =

Brahmanpara ব্রাহ্মণপাড়া
- Upazila
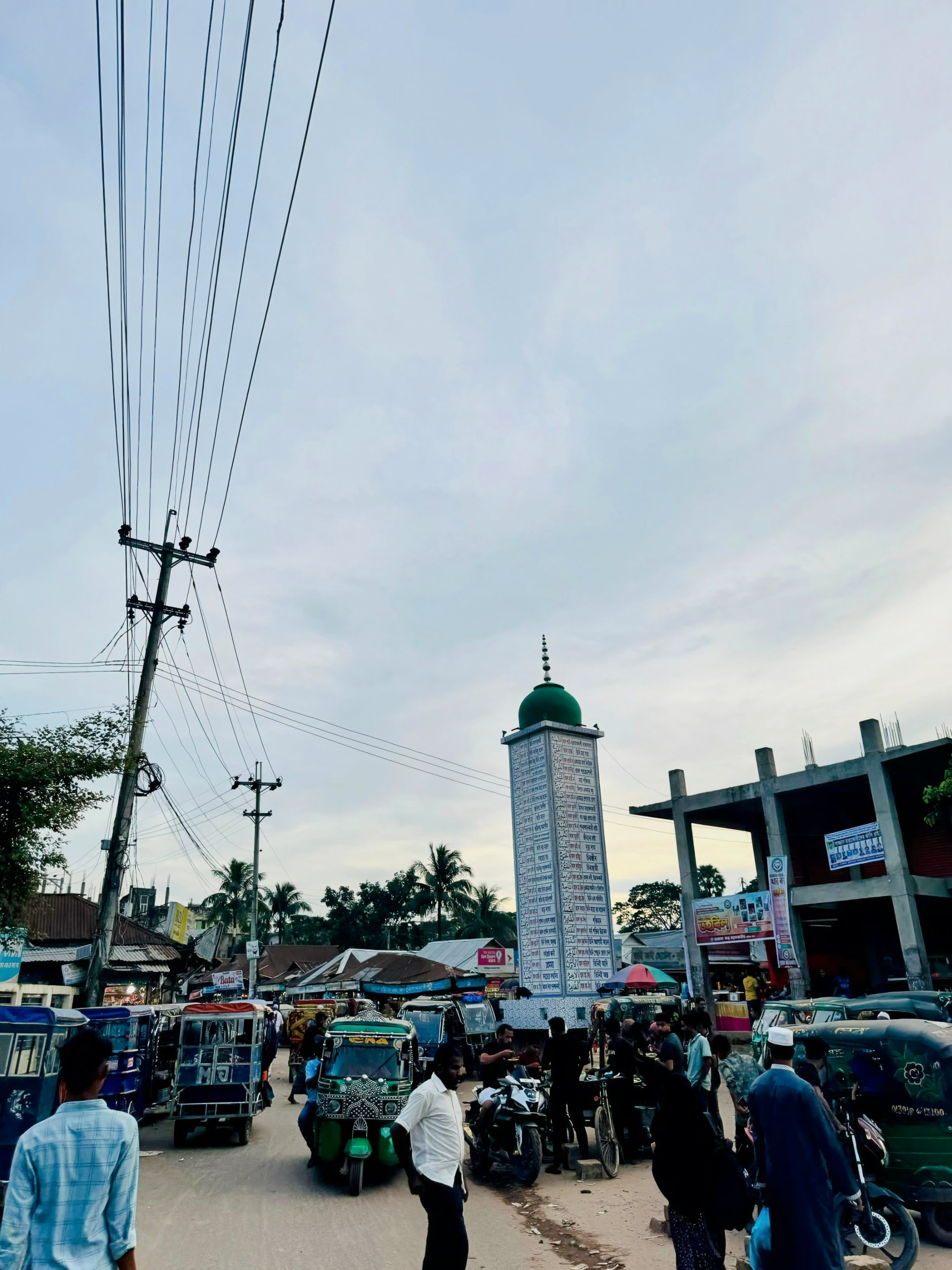
- A road in Brahmanpara

- Coordinates: 23°37′N 91°6.5′E
- Country: Bangladesh
- Division: Chittagong
- District: Comilla

Area
  - Total: 128.9 km^{2} (49.8 sq mi)

Population (2022)
  - Total: 232,628
  - Density: 1,805/km^{2} (4,674/sq mi)
- Time zone: UTC+6 (BST)
- Postal code: 3526
- Website: brahmanpara.comilla.gov.bd

Brahmanpara (Bengali: ব্রাহ্মণপাড়া) is an upazila of Comilla District in the Division of Chittagong, Bangladesh.

== Geography ==
It has a total area of 128.9 km^{2}.

== Demographics ==
Religions in Brahmanpara Upazila (2022)
Religion	Percent
Islam	97.67%
Hinduism	2.32%
Other or not stated	0.01%

According to the 2022 Bangladeshi census, Brahmanpara Upazila had 50,473 households and a population of 232,628. 11.46% of the population were under 5 years of age. Brahmanpara had a literacy rate (age 7 and over) of 77.31%: 78.42% for males and 76.37% for females, and a sex ratio of 87.46 males for every 100 females. 47,875 (20.58%) lived in urban areas.

According to the 2011 Census of Bangladesh, Brahmanpara Upazila had 35,068 households and a population of 204,691. 58,429 (28.54%) were under 10 years of age. Brahmanpara has a literacy rate (age 7 and over) of 54.74%, compared to the national average of 51.8%, and a sex ratio of 1101 females per 1000 males. 6,013 (2.94%) lived in urban areas.

== Administration ==
Brahmanpara Upazila is divided into Brahmanpara Municipality and eight union parishads: Brahmanpara, Chandla, Dulalpur, Madhabpur, Malapara, Shahebabad, Shashidal, and Shidli. The union parishads are subdivided into 53 mauzas and 65 villages.

== See also ==
- Upazilas of Bangladesh
- Districts of Bangladesh
- Divisions of Bangladesh
