= Burichang Upazila =

Burichang বুড়িচং
- Upazila
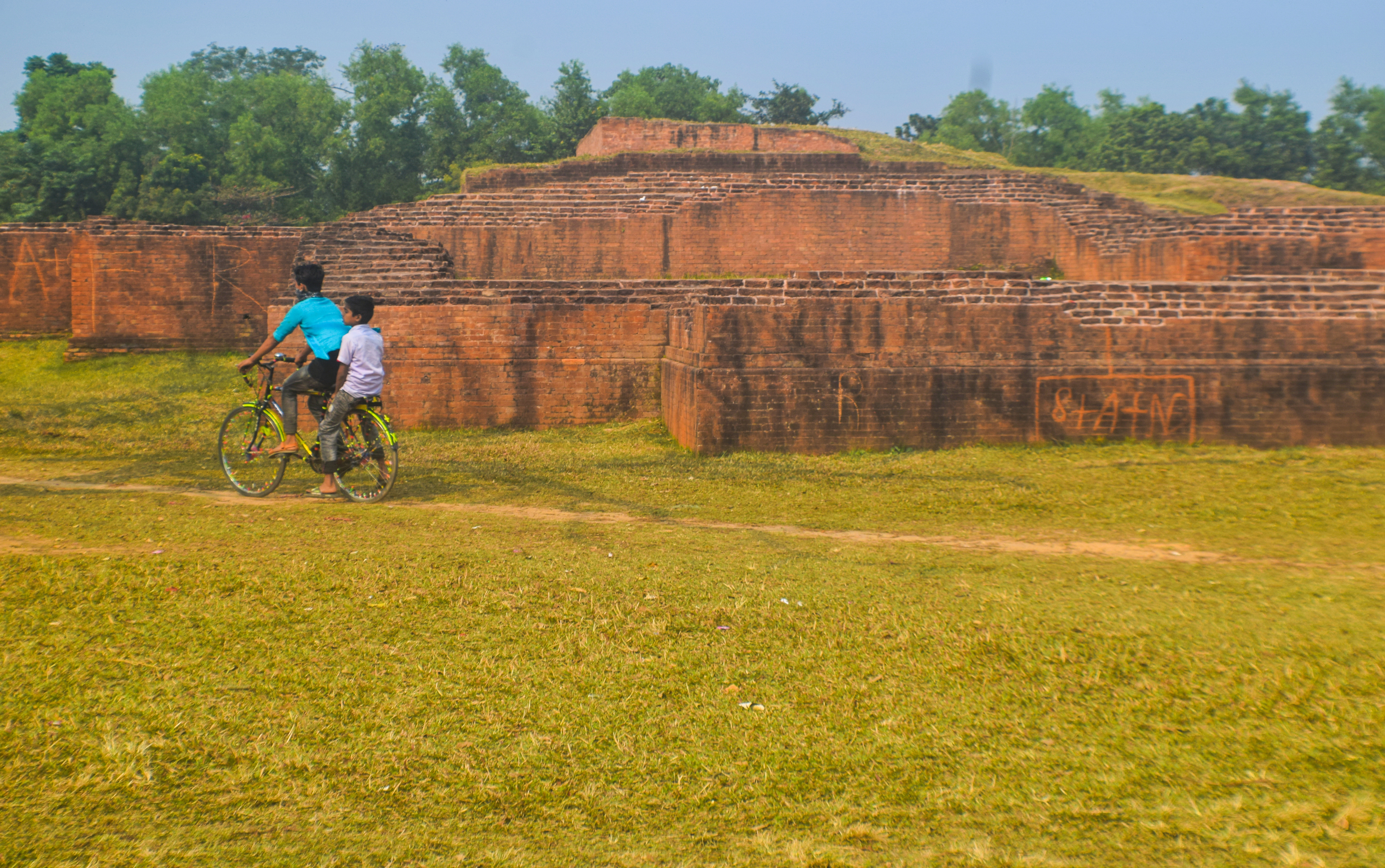
- Palace of Rani Mainamati

- Coordinates: 23°33′N 91°7.6′E
- Country: Bangladesh
- Division: Chattogram
- District: Cumilla

Area
  - Total: 163.76 km^{2} (63.23 sq mi)

Population (2022)
  - Total: 349,633
  - Density: 2,135.0/km^{2} (5,529.7/sq mi)
- Time zone: UTC+6 (BST)
- Postal code: 3520
- Area code: 08029
- Upazila Nirbahi Officer (UNO): Md. Tanvir Hossain
- Website: burichang.comilla.gov.bd

Burichang Upazila mauza geocode map

Burichang, also known as Burichong, (Bengali: বুড়িচং) is an upazila of Cumilla in the Division of Chattogram, Bangladesh.

== History ==
Raghunath Tarkavachaspati, a Bramhin scholar in the subject of logic migrated from Dingshai village now in West Bengal in the 17th century to establish the village of Burichang on the land granted to him by Chhatra Manikya the Maharaja of Tripura to start a Tola (an institute for Vedic learning).

== Geography ==
Burichang is located at 23.5500°N 91.1264°E. It has 58,402 households and a total area of 163.76 km^{2} (63.23 sq mi).which is located at the extreme near the Upazila by the Dhaka - Chattogram Highway. The Gumti River flows through this upazila. There is a lot of green forests here. There are some kinds of birds and wild animals. Moreover, there are snakes and reptiles. There are mud houses here. Jackfruit, mango, blackberry, litchi, many more fruit trees can be seen. Burichang village area is within the municipality and the value of property here, like the rest of the municipality, has increased significantly.

== Demographics ==
Religions in Burichang Upazila (2022)
Religion	Percent
Islam	96.70%
Hinduism	3.28%
Other or not stated	0.02%

According to the 2022 Bangladeshi census, Burichang Upazila had 77,845 households and a population of 349,633. 11.04% of the population were under 5 years of age. Burichang had a literacy rate (age 7 and over) of 79.63%: 80.81% for males and 78.60% for females, and a sex ratio of 88.99 males for every 100 females. 34,186 (9.78%) lived in urban areas.

According to the 2011 Census of Bangladesh, Burichang Upazila had 58,402 households and a population of 301,825. 76,424 (25.32%) were under 10 years of age. Burichang had a literacy rate (age 7 and over) of 57.03%, compared to the national average of 51.8%, and a sex ratio of 1067 females per 1000 males. 12,776 (4.23%) lived in urban areas.

== Administration ==
Burichang Upazila is divided into Burichang Municipality and eight union councils: Rajapur, Bakshimul, Sholonal, Pirjatrapur, Moynamoti, Mokam, Bharella North and Bharella South. The union councils are subdivided into 149 mauzas and 172 villages.

Burichang Municipality is subdivided into 9 wards, 7 mauzas and 7 villages.

== See also ==
- Upazilas of Bangladesh
- Districts of Bangladesh
- Divisions of Bangladesh
