= Comilla =

City in eastern Bangladesh

Comilla কুমিল্লা
- Metropolis
- Cumilla
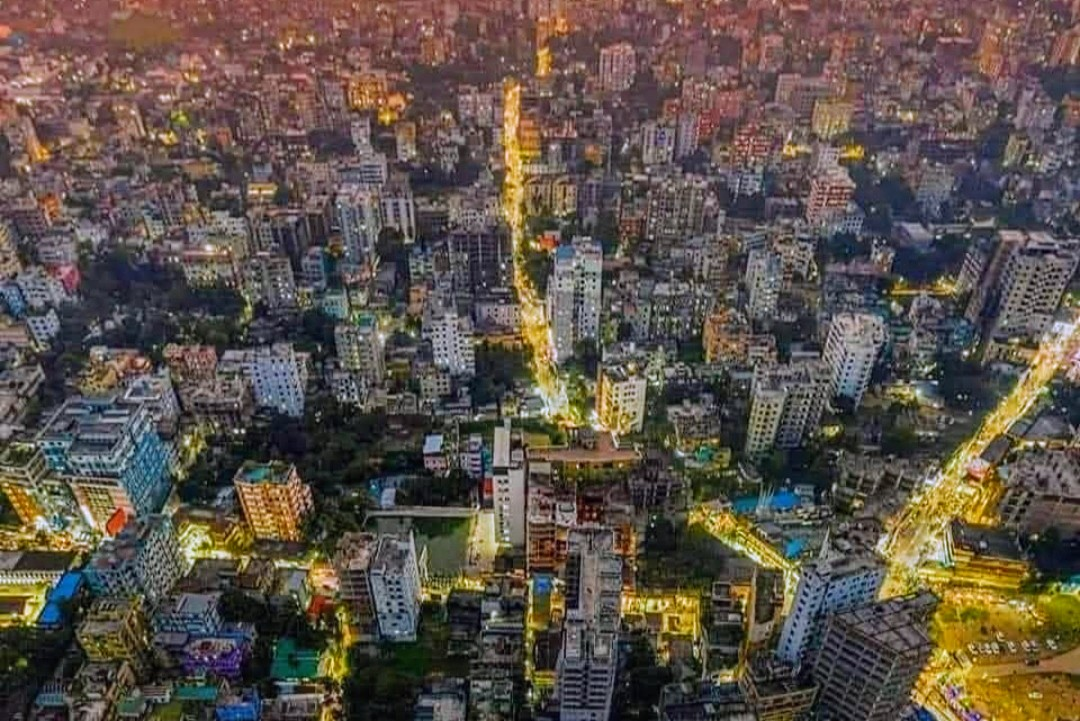
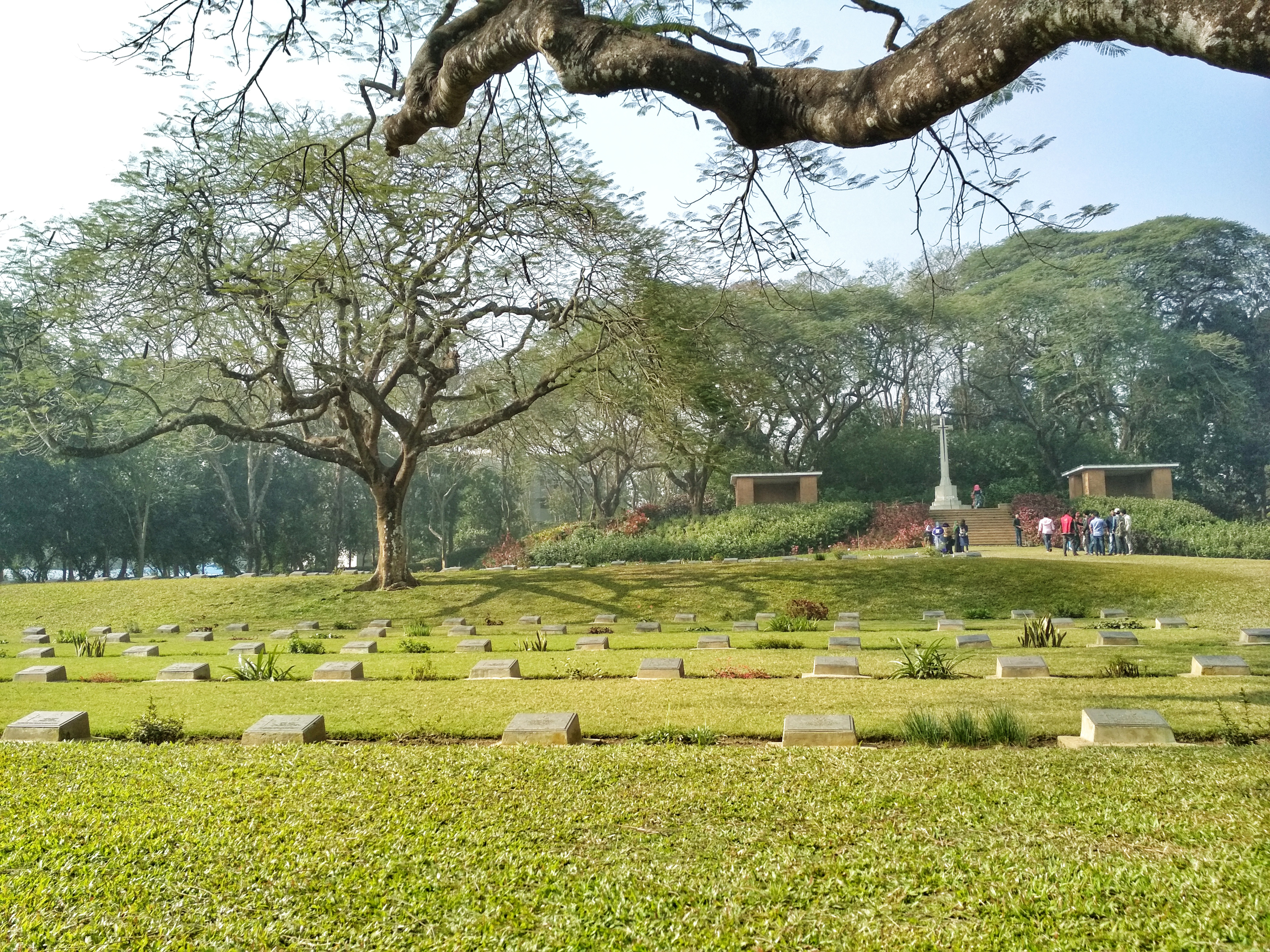
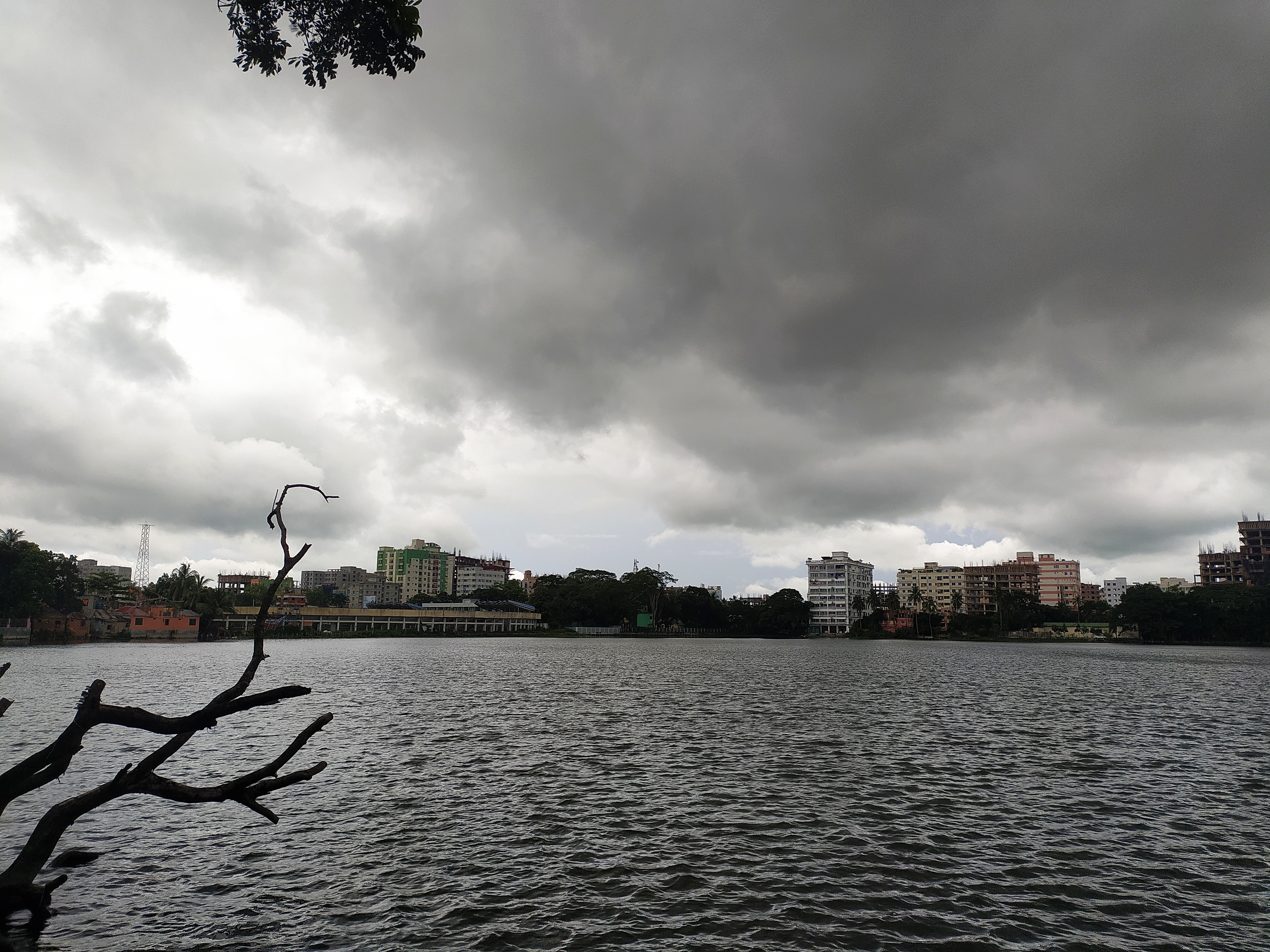
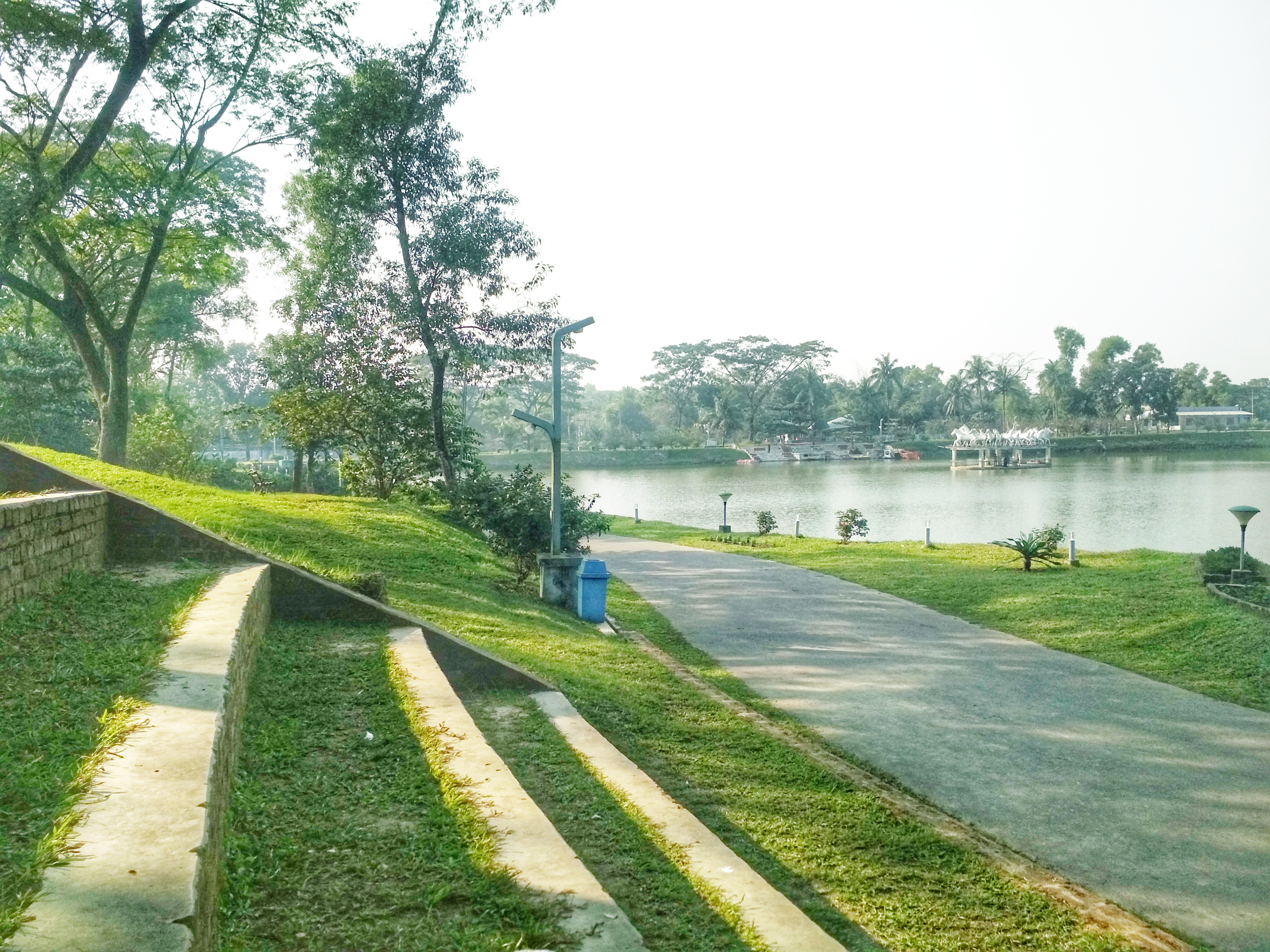
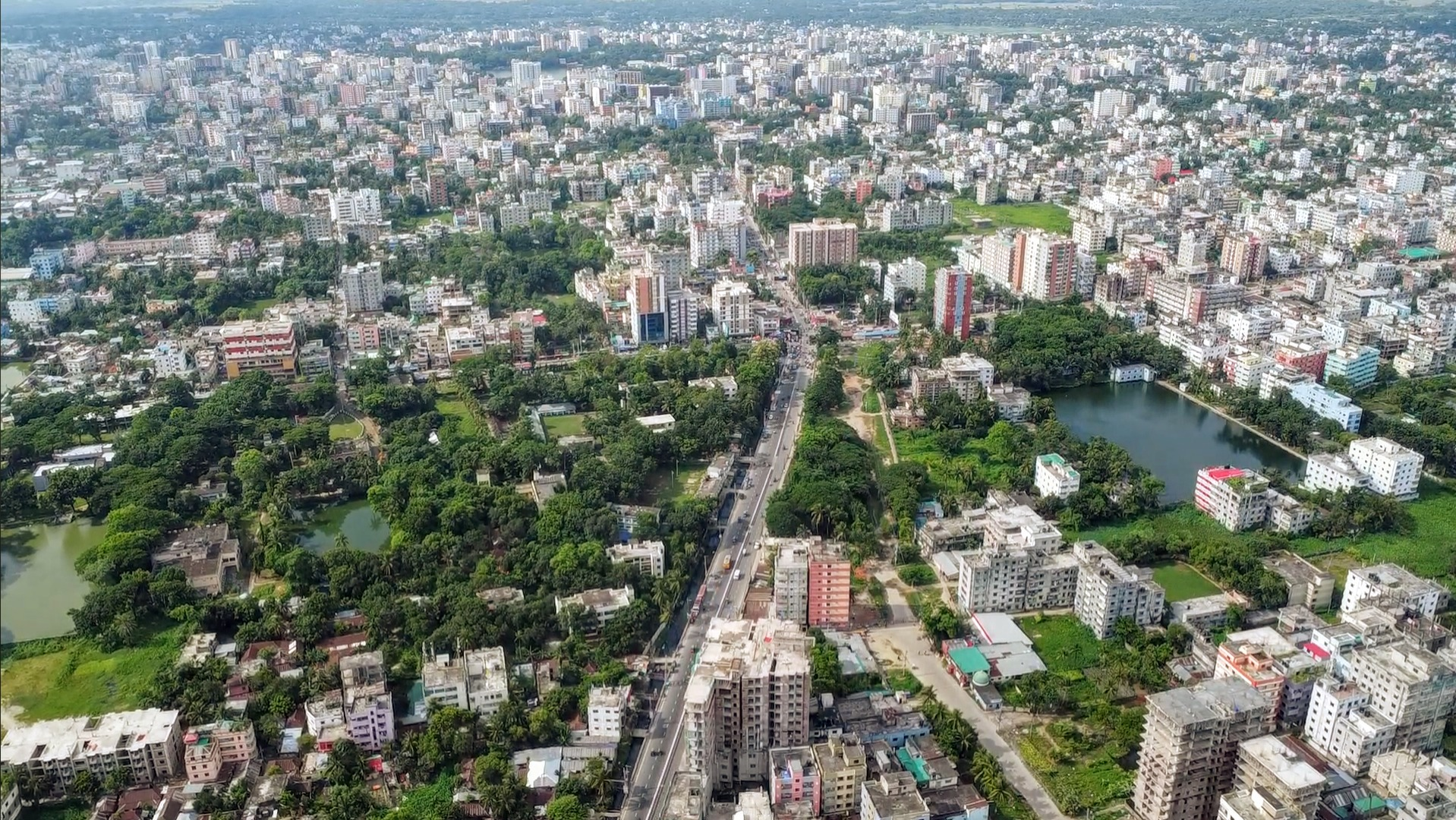
- Kandirpar Commercial Area Mainamati War Cemetery Dharmasagar Lake Roop sagar park Tomsom Bridge Green City Area

- Location in Chittagong Division Location in Bangladesh Location in Asia Comilla (Asia)
- Coordinates: 23°27′N 91°12′E
- Country: Bangladesh
- Division: Chittagong
- District: Comilla
- Municipality: 1890
- City Corporation: 10 July 2011

Government
  - Type: Mayor–Council
  - Body: Comilla City Corporation
  - Administrator: Md Yusuf Molla
  - City Council: 27 constituencies
  - Parliament: 1 constituencies

Area
  - Urban: 61.34 km^{2} (23.68 sq mi)
  - Metro: 148 km^{2} (57 sq mi)
- Elevation: 11 m (36 ft)

Population (2022)
  - Urban: 634,654
  - Urban density: 10,350/km^{2} (26,800/sq mi)
  - Metro: 867,757
  - Metro density: 5,860/km^{2} (15,200/sq mi)
- 8th in Bangladesh
  - Metro rank: 8th in Bangladesh

Languages
  - Official: Bengali • English
  - Regional: Eastern Bengali dialects
- Time zone: UTC+6 (Bangladesh Time)
- Postal code: 3500–3583
- Calling code: +880 81
- UN/LOCODE: BD CLA
- GDP (2022): PPP ▲$4.4 billion Nominal ▲$1.6 billion
- HDI (2023): 0.672 medium · 16th of 22
- Airport: Comilla Airport (currently non-operational)
- Planning Authority: COCC Development Authority
- Water Supply and Sewerage Authority: COCC WASA
- Website: comilla.gov.bd

Comilla (Bengali: কুমিল্লা), officially spelled Cumilla, is the seat of Comilla District and the second-largest city in Chittagong Division of Bangladesh. It is located on the banks of the Gumti River in the east of the country. Comilla was one of the cities of ancient Bengal. It was once the capital of Tripura kingdom. Comilla Airport is located in the Dulipara area of Comilla city Although it is currently replaced with Comilla Export Processing Zone (EPZ). Comilla City is a division centered city district with surrounding districts coming to Comilla in more diverse areas of work. Bibir Bazar land port is located 5 km away from Comilla city. The area of Comilla City Corporation is 53.04 square kilometers, so the surrounding areas of the main city fall under the jurisdiction of the City Corporation. The urban areas falling outside the Comilla City Corporation are considered suburbs, forming part of the metro area, which was estimated at 691,000 in 2025- a 2.98% increase from 2024.

== History ==
=== Ancient era ===
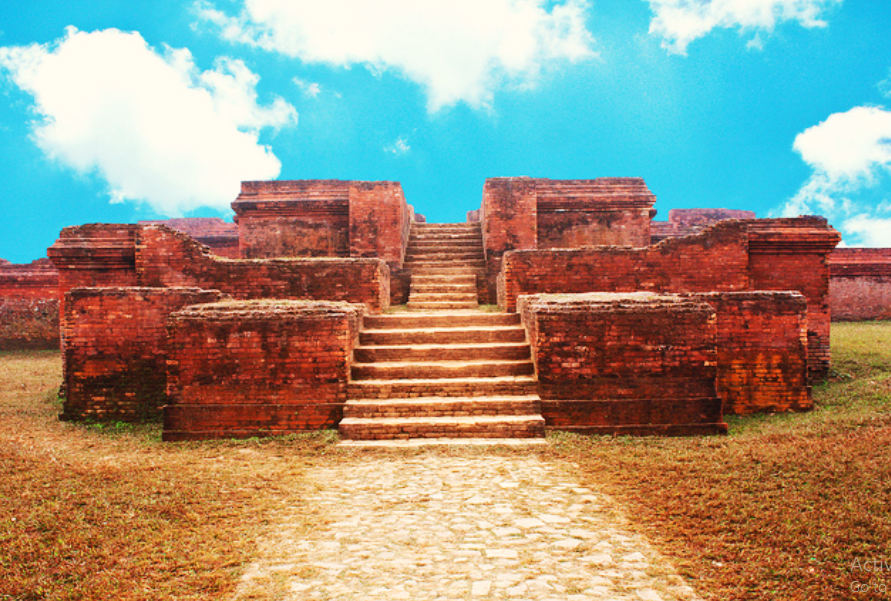
Shalban Bihar is evidence of the age of Comilla.

The Comilla region was once under the reign of Gangaridai and Samatata in ancient period. This district came under the reign of the kings of the Harikela in the ninth century AD. Lalmai Mainamati was ruled by the Deva dynasty (eighth century AD) and Chandra dynasty (during the 10th and mid-11th century AD). In 1732, it became the centre of the Bengal-backed domain of Jagat Manikya.

The Peasants' Movement against the king of Tripura in 1764, which originally formed under the leadership of Shamsher Gazi is a notable historical event in Comilla. It came under the rule of East India Company in 1765. This district was established as the Tripura district in 1790. It was renamed Comilla in 1960.

=== British era ===
Communal tension spread over Comilla when a Muslim was shot in the town during the partition of Bengal in 1905. On 21 November 1921, Kazi Nazrul Islam composed patriotic songs and tried to awaken the townspeople by protesting the Prince of Wales's visit to India. During this time, Avay Ashram, as a revolutionary institution, played a significant role. Poet Rabindranath Tagore and Mahatma Gandhi visited Comilla at that time. In 1931, approximately 4000 peasants in Mohini village in Chauddagram Upazila revolted against a land revenue tax. The British Gurkha soldiers fired indiscriminately on the crowd, killing four people. In a major peasant gathering, the police fired at Hasnabad of Laksam Upazila in 1932. Two people were killed and many were wounded. Comilla Victoria Government College in the city was named in memory of Queen Victoria. The main meaning of the context is that the people of Comilla have always maintained good relations and harmonized with others.

=== World War II ===
Comilla Cantonment is an important military base and the oldest in East Bengal. It was widely used by the British Indian Army during World War II. It was the headquarter of the British 14th Army. There is a war cemetery, Maynamati War Cemetery, in Comilla that was established after World War II to remember the Allied soldiers who died during World War I and II, mostly from Commonwealth states and the United States. There are a number of Japanese soldiers buried there as well, from the Second World War.

=== War of liberation of Bangladesh ===
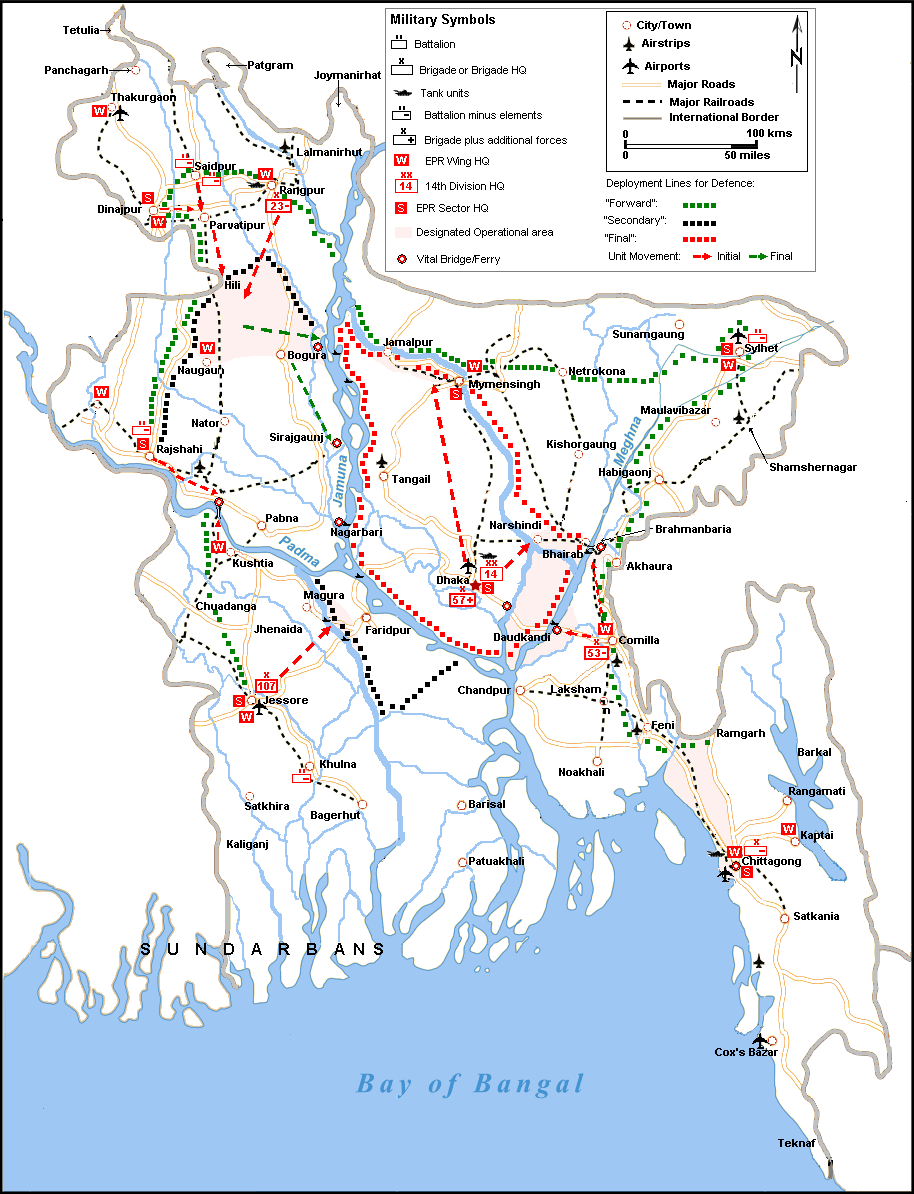
Pakistani Eastern Command plan for the defense of East Pakistan from 1967 to 1971 (generic representation—some unit locations not shown).

During the war for the liberation of Bangladesh, when Pakistan Army created the 39th ad hoc Division in mid-November, from the 14th Division units deployed in those areas, to hold on to the Comilla and Noakhali districts, and the 14th Division was tasked to defend the Sylhet and Brahmanbaria areas only. Pakistan Army's 93,000 troops unconditionally surrendered to the Joint Coalition forces on 16 December 1971. This day and event is commemorated as the Bijoy Dibos (Bengali: বিজয় দিবস) in Bangladesh.

== Geography ==
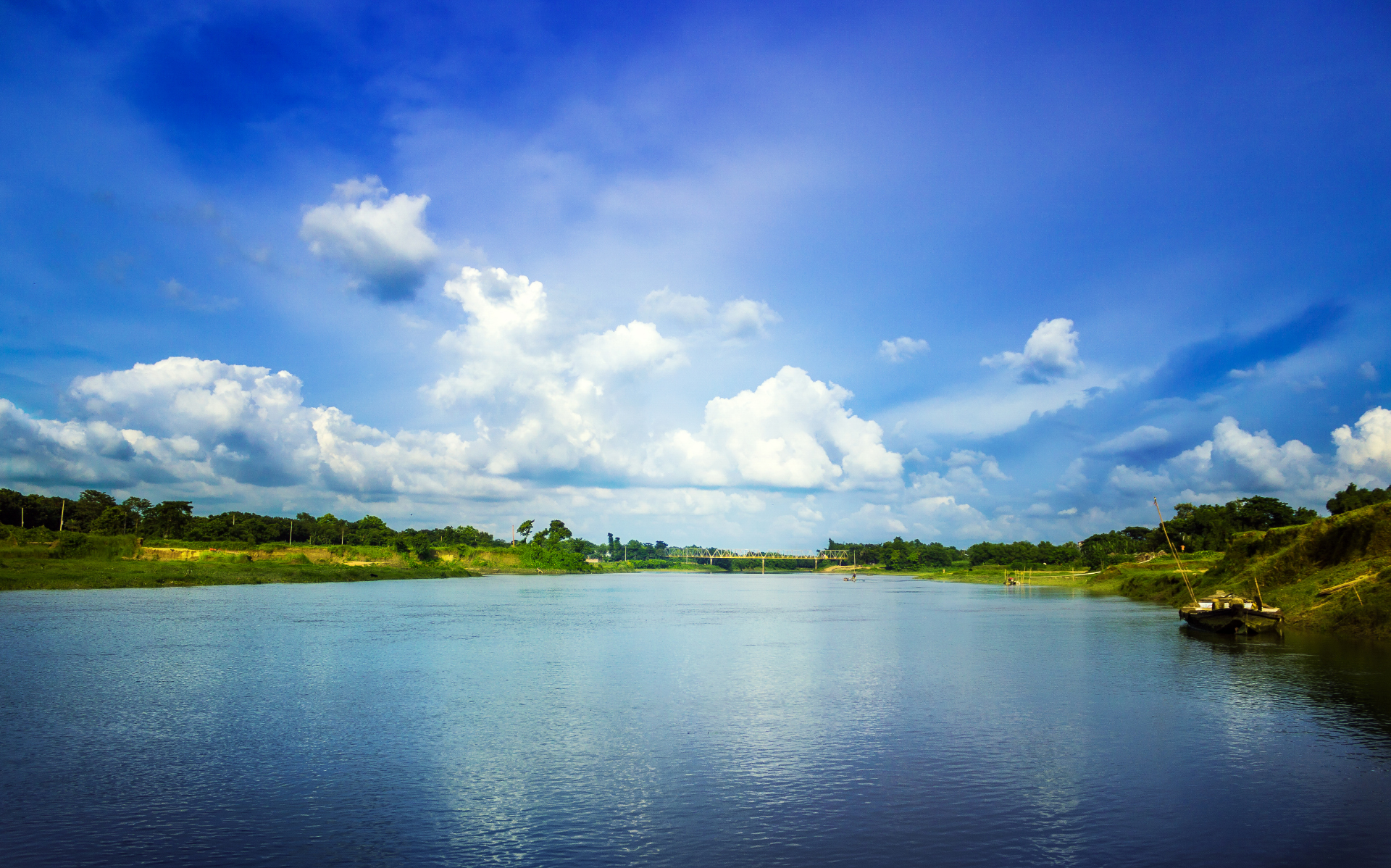
Gomati River, Comilla

Comilla is bounded by Burichang Upazila and Tripura on the north, Laksam and Chauddagram on the south, and Barura Upazila on the west. The major rivers that pass through Comilla include Gomati River and Little Feni.

=== Climate ===
Climate data for Comilla (1991–2020, extremes 1883-present)
Month	Jan	Feb	Mar	Apr	May	Jun	Jul	Aug	Sep	Oct	Nov	Dec	Year
Record high °C (°F)	31.0 (87.8)	34.0 (93.2)	36.0 (96.8)	41.8 (107.2)	37.5 (99.5)	37.0 (98.6)	37.0 (98.6)	36.8 (98.2)	37.0 (98.6)	36.5 (97.7)	34.8 (94.6)	32.0 (89.6)	41.8 (107.2)
Mean daily maximum °C (°F)	25.9 (78.6)	28.6 (83.5)	31.1 (88.0)	32.2 (90.0)	32.5 (90.5)	31.8 (89.2)	31.1 (88.0)	31.4 (88.5)	31.9 (89.4)	31.7 (89.1)	30.0 (86.0)	27.1 (80.8)	30.4 (86.7)
Daily mean °C (°F)	18.0 (64.4)	21.3 (70.3)	25.0 (77.0)	27.2 (81.0)	28.0 (82.4)	28.3 (82.9)	28.2 (82.8)	28.4 (83.1)	28.2 (82.8)	27.1 (80.8)	23.5 (74.3)	19.4 (66.9)	25.2 (77.4)
Mean daily minimum °C (°F)	12.1 (53.8)	15.6 (60.1)	19.9 (67.8)	22.8 (73.0)	24.3 (75.7)	25.5 (77.9)	25.7 (78.3)	25.7 (78.3)	25.4 (77.7)	23.7 (74.7)	18.7 (65.7)	13.8 (56.8)	21.1 (70.0)
Record low °C (°F)	5.3 (41.5)	8.5 (47.3)	12.0 (53.6)	15.4 (59.7)	18.5 (65.3)	21.5 (70.7)	20.2 (68.4)	22.6 (72.7)	21.2 (70.2)	18.0 (64.4)	11.8 (53.2)	7.8 (46.0)	5.3 (41.5)
Average precipitation mm (inches)	8 (0.3)	23 (0.9)	63 (2.5)	138 (5.4)	314 (12.4)	378 (14.9)	432 (17.0)	290 (11.4)	247 (9.7)	156 (6.1)	35 (1.4)	13 (0.5)	2,097 (82.6)
Average precipitation days (≥ 1 mm)	1	2	4	8	15	18	21	20	17	9	2	1	118
Average relative humidity (%)	77	75	77	81	82	86	87	86	86	84	80	79	82
Mean monthly sunshine hours	211.7	218.4	242.5	231.0	213.0	167.9	164.3	173.8	175.1	220.5	239.2	215.2	2,472.6
Source 1: NOAA
Source 2: Bangladesh Meteorological Department (humidity 1981–2010)

== Points of interest ==
Comilla has a number of tourist attractions. Various archaeological relics discovered in the district, especially from the seventh–eighth centuries, are now preserved in the Mainamati Museum. There is a World War II war cemetery in Comilla, which is protected and maintained by the Commonwealth War Graves Commission.

== Sports ==
Comilla Victorians is a professional cricket team based in Comilla and is the most successful franchise in the Bangladesh Premier League.

== Administration ==
Comilla is controlled by the Comilla City Corporation. It has 27 wards.

== Demographics ==
Population

Historical population

Year	Pop.	±% p.a.
1991	183,199	—
2001	224,782	+2.07%

Year	Pop.	±% p.a.
2011	326,386	+3.80%
2022	440,233	+2.76%

As of 2022 census results, Comilla City Corporation had 101,245 households and a population of 440,233. 17.63% of the population was under 10 years of age. Comilla had a literacy rate of 87.28% for those 7 years and older and a sex ratio of 100.68 males per 100 females.

Religions

Religions in Comilla City Corp. (2022)
Religion	Percent
Islam	91.96%
Hinduism	7.75%
Other or not stated	0.29%

== Transportation ==
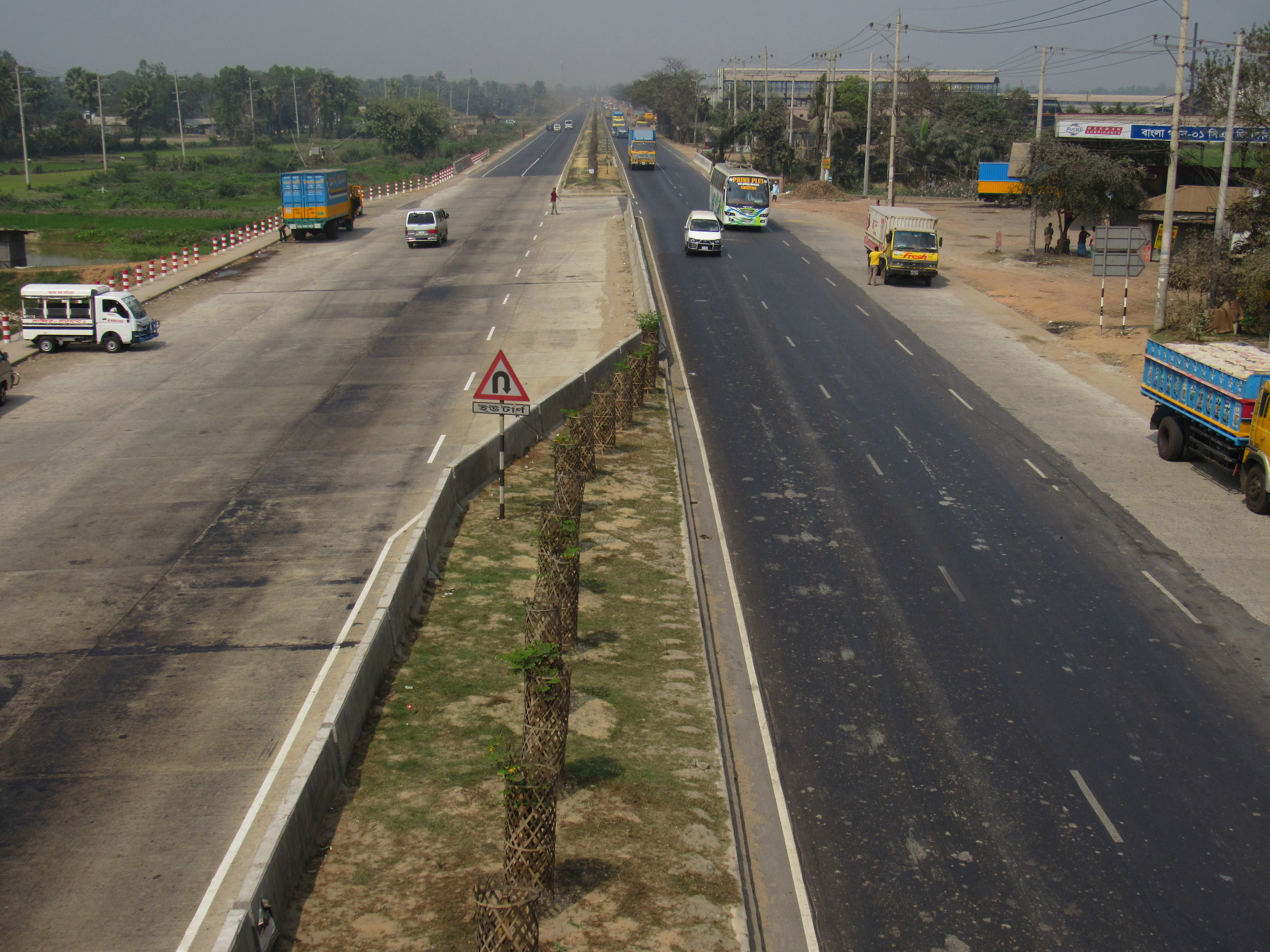
Dhaka-Chittagong Highway, Comilla

=== Highway ===
One of the oldest highways of the Indian subcontinent, 'The Grand Trunk Road', passes through the city. The Dhaka–Chittagong Highway bypasses the city from the cantonment to Shuagaji through Poduar Bazar.

=== Airport ===
Comilla Airport is a public-use airport that is not in use for commercial travel.

== Media ==
Daily newspapers published in Comilla include Comillar Kagoj, Daily Amader Comilla, Shiranam, and Rupasi Bangla, established in 1972. Amod, founded in 1955, is the city's oldest weekly newspaper.

== Notable residents ==
- Kazi Zafar Ahmed, Prime Minister
- Iqbal Karim Bhuiyan, General (Retired), 15th Chief of Army Staff of the Bangladesh Army
- Kamrul Ahsan: Secretary to the Government and now serving as Bangladesh Ambassador to Russia. Earlier served as High Commissioner to Canada and Singapore.
- Buddhadeb Bosu, Bengali poet, novelist, translator, editor, and essayist
- S. D. Burman, Indian singer, composer and music director, was born in Comilla in 1906.
- Sabitri Chatterjee, Indian Actress, was born in Comilla in 1937
- Shib Narayan Das, member of BLF. One of the designers of the first flag of Bangladesh.
- Shaheed Dhirendranath Datta was ex-Minister of Law, Language movement activist and Shaheed of 1971.
- Harold John Finlay (1901–1951), New Zealand palaeontologist and conchologist
- Major Abdul Gani, organizer of the First East Bengal Regiment
- Kazi Nazrul Islam, resided at Comilla
- Abdul Kadir, poet, researcher and editor
- Mustafa Kamal served as president of the International Cricket Council. He is a member of the Jatiya Sangsad representing the Comilla-10 constituency and is a former Minister for Planning and former Minister of Finance.
- Shaukat Mahmood, senior journalist and editor of Weekly Economic Times. Elected president of National Press Club.
- Abdul Matin Patwari, former vice-chancellor, Bangladesh University of Engineering and Technology (BUET) and former director general, IUT
- Reba Rakshit, bodybuilder and circus performer, was born in Comilla in the early 1930s.
- Bidya Sinha Saha Mim, actress, grew up partly in Comilla, where her father worked for a time.
- Ayman Sadiq, founder of 10 Minute School
- Biplob Bhattacharjee, former Bangladesh national team footballer
- Asif Nazrul, an adviser in the Yunus ministry, was born in Comilla in 1966.
- Rashid Ahmed, Kolkata Mohammedan footballer in the 1930s, was born in Comilla.
- Khondkar Nasim Ahmed, former Kolkata Mohammedan and India XI footballer
- Sirajuddin, former Kolkata Mohammedan and India XI footballer

== See also ==
- Districts of Bangladesh
- Divisions of Bangladesh
- List of educational institutions in Comilla District
- Thana
- Upazila
- Upazilas of Bangladesh
