= Galimpur Union =

Union in Comilla District, Barura Upazila

No. 11 Galimpur Union Galimpur
- Union
- Location within Bangladesh
- Coordinates: 23°16′N 91°4′E
- Upazila: Barura Upazila
- District: Comilla District
- Division: Chittagong Division
- Postal Code: 3560

Galimpur (Bengali: গালিমপুর) is a union parishad of Baruda upazila in Comilla district of Bangladesh.

== Location and boundaries ==
Location of Galimpur Union in the south-east of Barura Upazila. It is bounded on the north-east by Shilmuri South Union and Shilmuri North Union, on the north by Baruda Municipality, on the west by Shakpur Union and Vauksar Union, on the south-west by Payalgachha Union and on the south-east by Bakai Union of Laksam Upazila and Bakai North Union of Lalmai Upazila.

== Administrative structure ==
No. 11 Union Parishad is under Baruda Upazila of Galimpur Union. Administrative activities of this union are under Baruda police station. It is part of Comilla-6, the 256th constituency of the Jatiya Sangsad.

== See also ==
- Barura Upazila
- Comilla District
