= Bhabanipur Union =

Bhabanipur Union Parishad ভবানীপুর
- Bangladesh
- Location within Bangladesh
- Coordinates: 23°24′N 91°6′E
- Upazila: Barura Upazila
- District: Comilla District
- Division: Chittagong Division
- Postal code: 3450

Bhabanipur (Bengali: ভবানীপুর) is a union parishad of Baruda upazila in Comilla district of Bangladesh.

== Population ==
Almost 21,550.

== History ==
Bhabanipur Union was formerly known as Bhabanipur South Union.

== Location and boundaries ==
Bhabanipur Union is located in the northeastern part of Baruda upazila. It is bounded on the south by Shilmuri North Union, on the west by Baruda Municipality, on the north by Aganagar Union and Kalirbazar Union of Comilla Adarsh Sadar Upazila and on the east by Comilla Sadar Dakshin Upazila Bijoypur Union.

== Administrative structure ==
Bhabanipur Union is under Barura Upazila. Administrative activities of this union are under Baruda police station. It is part of the Comilla-6 constituency of the Jatiya Sangsad.

== Education ==
Secondary Schools:

- Bataichhari High School

Madrasas:

- Bataichhari Dakhil Madrasa

Primary schools:

- Jalgaon Government Primary School
- Lakshmipur Primary School
- Bhabanipur Primary School

== Local markets ==
1. Bataichari New Market (Sujatnagar)
2. Bataichhari Old Market
3. Jalgaon Fakir Market
4. Bhabanipur Super Market

== See also ==
- Barura Upazila
- Comilla District
