= Shilmuri South Union =

Union in Comilla District, Barura Upazila

Shilmuri South Union Parishad
- Union
- Location within Bangladesh
- Coordinates: 23°21.5′N 91°6′E
- Upazila: Barura Upazila
- District: Comilla District
- Division: Comills Division

Population
  - Total: 24,493
- Postal Code: 3560

Shilmuri (Bengali: শিলমুড়ী) is a union territory of Barura upazila in Comilla district in southern Bangladesh.

== Geography ==
Shilmuri South Union is located in the eastern part of Baruda upazila. It is bounded on the north and west by Shilmuri North Union, on the south by Galimpur Union and Baki North Union of Lalmai Upazila, on the southeast by Bagmara South Union and Bagmara North Union of Lalmai Upazila and on the east by Barpara Union of Comilla Sadar South Upazila.

The area of this union is almost 4221 acres.

== Population ==
The total population is 24493.

== Administrative structure ==
No. 9 Union Parishad is under Baruda upazila of Shilmuri North Union. Administrative activities of this union are under Baruda police station. It is part of Comilla-6, the 256th constituency of the Jatiya Sangsad.

== Education ==
=== List of government primary schools ===
Name	Name of the school	Location of School
01	Lagnasar East Government Primary School	Lagnasar, Baruda, Comilla
02	Amratali Government Primary School	Amratali, Baruda, Comilla
03	Lagnasar P: Government Primary School	Lagnasar, Baruda, Comilla
04	Banshpur Government Primary School	Banshpur, Baruda, Comilla
05	Shilmuri Government Primary School	Shilmuri, Baruda, Comilla
07	Jayag Government Primary School	Jayag, Baruda, Comilla
07	Sundardaul Government Primary School	Sundardaul, Baruda, Comilla
07	Chengahata Regi: Primary School	Chengahata, Baruda, Comilla
09	Shialora Reggie: Primary School	Lagnasar, Baruda, Comilla
10	Manohara Reji: Primary School	Manohara, Baruda, Comilla
11	Falkamuri Regi: Primary School	Falkamuri, Baruda, Comilla

=== Secondary high schools ===
No.	Name of the school	Name of head teacher
01	Amratali C Ali High School	Kazi Md. Ayub Ali
02	Shilmuri R&R High School	Abul Kalam Majumdar
03	Shaher Banu Ideal School	Mokhlesur Rahman Munshi
04	Lognosher Dakhil Madrasa	

== See also ==
- Barura Upazila
- Comilla District
