= Aganagar Union =

No. 1 Aganagar Union Parishad আগানগর
- Union
- Location within Bangladesh
- Coordinates: 23°25′N 91°4′E
- Upazila: Barura Upazila
- District: Comilla District
- Postal code: 3560

Agangar (Bengali: আগানগর) is a union parishad of Baruda upazila in Comilla district of Bangladesh.

== Population ==
About 21,750.

== History ==
Aganagar Union was formerly known as Bhabanipur North Union.

== Location and boundaries ==
Agangar Union is located in the northeastern part of Baruda upazila. It is bounded on the west by Khoshbas North Union and Khoshbas South Union, on the southwest by Baruda Municipality, on the south by Bhabanipur Union and on the east and north by Kalirbazar Union of Comilla Adarsh Sadar Upazila.

== Administrative structure ==
Agangar Union is the 1st Union Parishad under Barura Upazila. Administrative activities of this union are under Baruda police station. It is part of Comilla-6, the 256th constituency of the Jatiya Sangsad.
