= Military budget of Bangladesh =

Allocation of the military budget of Bangladesh

The Military budget of Bangladesh is the proportion of the overall national budget of Bangladesh that is allocated for the purpose of funding the Bangladesh Armed Forces. This military budget finances employee salaries and training costs, the maintenance of equipment and facilities, support of new or ongoing operations, and development and procurement of new weapons, equipment, and vehicles. The budget funds three branches of the Bangladesh Armed Forces: the Army, Navy and Air Force.

For the 2022-23 fiscal year, the Bangladesh Armed Forces were allocated ৳40360 crore (US$3.3 billion) (Note: Excludes funding allocated by the Government of Bangladesh for Forces Goal 2030.) by the Government of Bangladesh, a 7.5% increase from the previous fiscal year.

== Other military-related expenditures ==
Unofficial estimates places the total amount of military spending for the Bangladesh Armed Forces higher than the official allocated figures, however, the approximately calculation differs. As of 2021, Bangladesh military maintains a thriving military industrial complex and other business interests. According to the Economist, Sena Kalyan Sangstha, a trust owned by the Bangladesh Army, alone has assets well over $700 million.

Beside massively expanding industrial complex, the Bangladesh Armed Forces receives an undisclosed budget for its ongoing modernization program Forces Goal 2030. The allocation is used primarily for procurement of weapons and technologies, establishment of new military bases and R&D. According to Ministry of Finance report, the government allocated approximately 40000-crores taka or $5.2 billion between the 2012-2017 period.

According to reports published in 2007, Bangladesh Armed Forces also receives approximately $300 million funding from United Nations annually.

== Previous budgets ==
FY	Budget (bn)	Change	Expenditure (%)
2025-26	3.34		
2024-25	3.60		
2023-24	3.92		
2022-23	4.8	7.53%	0.91%
2021-22	4.5	8.0%	1.3%
2020-21	4.06	9.50%	1.16%
2019-20	3.87	9.40%	1.28%
2018-19	3.59	10.7%	1.31%
2017-18	3.45	9.40%	1.38%
2016-17	3.24	10.6%	1.46%
2015-16	2.82	8.70%	1.45%
2014-15	2.36	8.36%	1.36%
2013-14	2.05	11.3%	1.36%
2012-13	1.82	1.20%	1.36%
2011-12	1.80	9.05%	1.39%
2010-11	1.62		1.40%

== See also ==
- Defence industry of Bangladesh
- Forces Goal 2030
- Bangabandhu Aeronautical Centre
- National Budget of Bangladesh
