= 2025 National budget of Bangladesh =

Budget of the Bangladeshi government for the fiscal year of 2025–26

2025–26 National Budget of Bangladesh
Annual Financial Statement of the Government of Bangladesh for the year 2025–26 Finance Bill, 2025
- Government Seal of Bangladesh
- Submitted by: Salehuddin Ahmed (Adviser of Finance)
- Submitted to: Muhammad Yunus (Chief Adviser)
- Presented: 2 June 2025
- Passed: 2 June 2025
- Country: Bangladesh
- Parliament: Dissolved
- Government: Yunus ministry
- Party: Independent
- Finance minister: Salehuddin Ahmed
- Total revenue: ৳5.64 trillion (US$46 billion)
- Total expenditures: ৳7.90 trillion (US$64 billion) ▼(0.88%)
- Deficit: ▲ ৳2.26 trillion (US$18 billion) (3.6% of GDP)
- GDP: ▲ ৳57.91 trillion (US$470 billion)
- Website: mof.gov.bd

The national budget of Bangladesh for the fiscal year 2025–26 was presented by finance adviser Salehuddin Ahmed on 2 June 2025. This will be Bangladesh's 54th national budget, and at the same time, it is the first budget of the interim government formed after the July Uprising.

The interim government has unveiled a national budget of Tk 7.90 trillion (7,90,000 crore) for fiscal year 2025–26, which is slightly smaller (about Tk 7,000 crore less) than the original budget of Tk 7.97 trillion for 2024–25.

The budget's financing strategy puts a major emphasis on boosting revenues. The government set a revenue collection target of Tk 5,64,000 crore for FY2025–26, which is about 7.6% higher than the current year's revised target – roughly 9% of GDP. Of this, Tk 4,99,000 crore is expected to come from the National Board of Revenue through taxes, with the remaining Tk 65,000 crore from non-tax and other sources.

Many organizations have criticized this budget as it shows no structural difference from the previous budget of the Awami League government. According to the Centre for Policy Dialogue, the fundamental philosophy of the 2025–26 fiscal year budget—building an “inequality-free society”—is not reflected in the practical measures taken. Economist Fahmida Khatun stated that the reduction of Annual Development Programme allocations in the education, health, and agriculture sectors in the 2025–26 budget is concerning.
