= Shilmuri North Union =

Union in Comilla District, Barura Upazila

Shilmuri North Union Parishad শিলমুড়ি উত্তর ইউনিয়ন পরিষদ
- Union
- Location within Bangladesh
- Coordinates: 23°22.5′N 91°6′E
- Upazila: Barura Upazila
- District: Comilla District
- Division: Chittagong Division
- Postal Code: 3560

Shilmuri (Bengali: শিলমুড়ী) is a union parishad of Barura Upazila in Comilla District in northern Bangladesh.

== Geography ==
Shilmuri North Union is located in the eastern part of Baruda upazila. It is bounded on the north by Bhabanipur Union, on the west by Barura Municipality, on the south-west by Galimpur Union, on the south and south-east by Shilmuri South Union and on the east by Barpara Union of Comilla Sadar Dakshin Upazila.

== Population ==
Almost 17,499 people.

== Administrative structure ==
Union Parishad No. 10 under Barura Upazila of Shilmuri North Union. Administrative activities of this union are under Baruda police station. It is part of the Comilla-6 constituency of the Jatiya Sangsad.

== Education ==
=== List of madrasas ===
1. Dimdul Rahmania Sunnia Da: Madrasa.
2. Sultanpur Madhyampara Haji Abdul Ali Madrasa and Orphanage.
3. Arui Islamia Yusufia Hafizia Nurani Madrasa.
4. Jibanpur Ashraful Ulum Hafizia Nurani Madrasa.
5. Sholapukuria Nurani Madrasa.
6. Yogipukuria Women's Madras.
7. Dighilgaon Dighirpar Hafizia Madrasa and Orphanage.
8. Dighalgaon Dakshinpara Hafizia Madrasa.
