= 2022 National budget of Bangladesh =

Budget of the Bangladeshi government for the fiscal year of 2022–23

2022 National Budget of Bangladesh
- • Government Seal • National Emblem
- Submitted: 9 June 2022
- Submitted by: Mustafa Kamal (Minister of Finance)
- Submitted to: Jatiya Sangsad
- Presented: 9 June 2022
- Passed: 30 June 2022
- Country: Bangladesh
- Parliament: 11th Jatiya Sangsad
- Party: Bangladesh Awami League
- Finance minister: AHM Mustafa Kamal
- Total revenue: ৳433000 crore (US$36 billion) ▲(10.32%)
- Total expenditures: ৳678064 crore (US$56 billion) ▲(12.32%)
- Deficit: 5.5% ▼(0.7%)
- Website: mof.gov.bd

The 2022 National budget of Bangladesh was presented by Minister of Finance AHM Mustafa Kamal on 9 June 2022. The budget is for the fiscal year beginning on 1 July 2022, and ending on 30 June 2023. The budget was the 14th presented by the Awami League-led Grand Alliance of Prime Minister Sheikh Hasina since returning to office in 2009. The budget was the third to be presented since the outbreak of the COVID-19 pandemic and focused primarily on economic recovery from the pandemic and ameliorating the impact of rising inflation as a result of the Russo-Ukrainian War.

== History ==
The National Budget is the annual financial statement of Bangladesh; an estimate of income and expenditure of the government of Bangladesh on a periodical basis. Under Article 87.(1) of the Constitution of Bangladesh, it is a compulsory task of the government. Upon achieving independence, the first budget of Bangladesh was presented by Tajuddin Ahmad in 1972 and totaled ৳786 crore (US$65 million). This was the 51st national budget of Bangladesh. Former ministers of finance AMA Muhith and Saifur Rahman presented 12 budgets each for their respective governments, the highest number in Bangladesh's history. The 2022 budget was the 51st in the nation's history and the 23rd budget to be presented by an Awami League-led government.

== Significant announcements ==
- The total expenditure for the budget is ৳678064 crore (US$56 billion), an increase of ৳74383 crore (US$6.1 billion) (12.32%) from the previous fiscal year. This consists of ৳431998 crore (US$35 billion) allocated for operating and other expenditures, while ৳246066 crore (US$20 billion) has been allocated for the annual development programme.
- The total revenue collection has been fixed at ৳433000 crore (US$36 billion), of which ৳370000 crore (US$30 billion) is due to be raised by the National Board of Revenue, while ৳63000 crore (US$5.2 billion) will be raised from non-NBR and other sources.
- The total GDP growth rate was fixed at 7.5% with an estimated total GDP of ৳4450000 crore (US$370 billion)
- The total deficit of the budget is ৳245064 crore (US$20 billion) equivalent to 5.5% of GDP, a 0.7% decrease from the previous fiscal year. The government intends to finance the deficit through the use of various domestic and external sources.
- The average inflation rate was projected to be 5.6%. Kamal stated that rising inflation was as a result of external factors beyond the control of the government such as the rise in oil prices, depreciation of the taka against the US dollar, increase in inflation among trading partners, disruption of the global supply chain and the Russo-Ukrainian War. The Finance Minister pledged the government would do its utmost to contain inflation and provide relief for the masses.
- The Minister announced an initiative to allow deputy commissioners of taxes to cut supplies of utilities such as power, water and gas to businesses who deliberately evade the payment of taxes.
