= National Budget of Bangladesh =

Budget of the Bangladeshi government

National budget of Bangladesh
- • Government Seal • National Emblem
- Country: Bangladesh
- Government: Government of the People's Republic of Bangladesh
- Website: mof.gov.bd

The National Budget of Bangladesh is the government's annual financial statement, outlining the projected income and expenditure for the fiscal year. According to Article 87.(1) of the Constitution of Bangladesh, presenting this budget is a mandatory duty of the government. It is the annual budget of the People's Republic of Bangladesh set by Ministry of Finance for the following financial year, with the revenues to be gathered by National Board of Revenue (NBR) to identify planned government spending and expected government revenue and the expenditures of the public sector, to forecast economic conditions in compliance with government policy.

After gaining independence in 1971, Bangladesh's first budget was presented by Tajuddin Ahmad in 1972, totaling ৳786 crore (US$67 million). Former Finance Ministers AMA Muhith and Saifur Rahman each presented 12 budgets during their respective tenures, marking the highest number of budgets in the country's history. The 2024-25 budget marked the 53rd in Bangladesh's history and was the 25th budget presented by an Awami League-led government.

== History ==
=== Tajuddin Ahmad ===
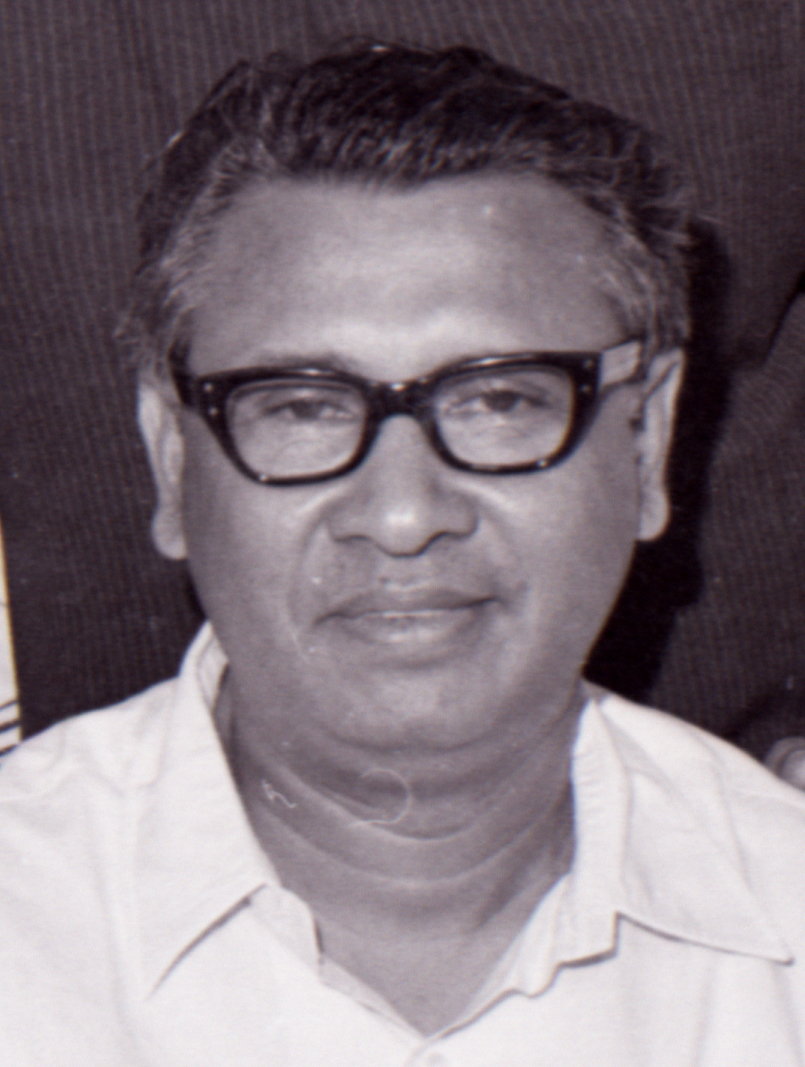
Tajuddin Ahmad presented the first National Budget in 1972

Following the war of independence, Tajuddin Ahmad presented three key budgets aimed at economic recovery, reconstruction, and establishing the foundations of a socialist society. Ahmed introduced this budget on 30 june 1972.For the 1972-73 fiscal year Ahmad introduced a budget totaling ৳786 crore In his 1973-74 budget speech, the finance minister emphasized the importance of utilizing domestic resources more effectively and reducing dependence on foreign aid. He also advocated for boosting exports and developing import substitution strategies.

=== Azizur Rahman Mallik ===
Mallick presented a budget during the transitional period of the country, focusing on development activities. In the 1975-76 fiscal year, Mallick introduced a budget of ৳1,549 crore, which included a significant increase in the upper limit of private capital investment, raising it from ৳25 lakh to ৳3 crore.

=== Ziaur Rahman ===
During his tenure as both military ruler and President, Ziaur Rahman also assumed the role of finance minister, overseeing the presentation of three key budgets. His first budget notably raised the minimum income tax threshold for individual taxpayers from ৳8,400 to ৳10,000. The second budget introduced measures allowing the legalization of "black money" without penalties. In his third budget, Zia announced the implementation of new pay scales.

=== Mirza Nurul Huda ===
Mirza Nurul Huda presented his sole budget during the 1979-80 fiscal year, amounting to ৳3,317 crore. This budget was significant as it was the first to be presented in the House after a three-year gap. A key focus of Huda's budget was on enhancing direct taxation as a means of revenue generation.

=== Saifur Rahman (First Tenure) ===
M Saifur Rahman holds the record for presenting the most budgets in Bangladesh's history. In his first two budgets, he introduced significant measures to enhance tax compliance and regulate imports. In his inaugural budget for the 1980-81 fiscal year, which totaled ৳4,108 crore, Saifur made it mandatory for individuals with an income exceeding ৳20,000 to file tax returns on time, with penalties imposed for non-compliance. In his second budget, he introduced a 50% reduction in duties on computers and imposed a 1% development surcharge on all imports.

=== A M A Muhith (First Tenure) ===
Abul Maal Abdul Muhith presented his first two budgets under the military rule of General HM Ershad, bringing significant changes to the fiscal landscape. In his initial budget for the 1982-83 fiscal year, which totaled ৳4,738 crore, Muhith raised the tax-free income limit to ৳20,000 and introduced a dearness allowance for public servants. In the following fiscal year, he presented a larger budget of ৳5,896 crore, marking a notable increase. During this period, Muhith also introduced a new taxation structure by categorizing imported goods into three distinct groups for tax purposes, a first in Bangladesh's budgetary history.

=== Syeduzzaman ===
During M Syeduzzaman's tenure as finance minister, he presented four budgets, each with measures aimed at boosting investment and refining tax policies. To encourage investment, tax exemptions were granted to new industries. Additionally, a new income tax law was introduced to streamline the tax system. For the second time, an opportunity to legalize "black money" was offered, albeit with a mandatory 20% tax on the amount being regularized. His budgets reflected an ongoing effort to stimulate economic growth while addressing fiscal challenges.

=== MA Munim and Wahidul Haque ===
During the period when Major General MA Munim and Wahidul Haque served as finance ministers, significant changes were introduced in the management of banks, debt, and taxation policies. Notably, for the first time, government officials were subjected to income tax. Major General MA Munim presented two budgets. In between, Wahidul Haque presented a budget of ৳12,703 crore for the 1989-90 fiscal year. One of the key initiatives during Munim's tenure was the introduction of a national system for distributing taxpayer identification numbers, which marked an important step in the modernization of the country's tax infrastructure.

=== Saifur Rahman (Second Tenure) ===
Saifur Rahman, during his second tenure as the finance minister, presented five budgets that focused on significant economic reforms, including the promotion of liberal trade policies, and the pursuit of sustainable economic growth. A notable policy shift during this period was the adoption of a flexible exchange rate. Additionally, all surcharges and levies that had been imposed for the construction of the Bangabandhu Bridge were withdrawn, reflecting a shift toward easing the financial burden on citizens and businesses.The introduction of Value-Added Tax on July 1, 1991, marked a significant milestone in Bangladesh's taxation system, laying the foundation for modern fiscal management.

=== Shams Kibria ===
Shah AMS Kibria presented six budgets. Under his leadership, the country achieved a 7% growth GDP rate for the first time, and national poverty alleviation targets were established. His budgets introduced significant social security programs, including old-age allowances, aimed at providing a safety net for vulnerable populations. Additionally, Kibria's policies offered a golden opportunity to regularize “black money” by investing it in the stock market, the industrial sector, or purchasing luxury cars, thereby encouraging economic formalization.

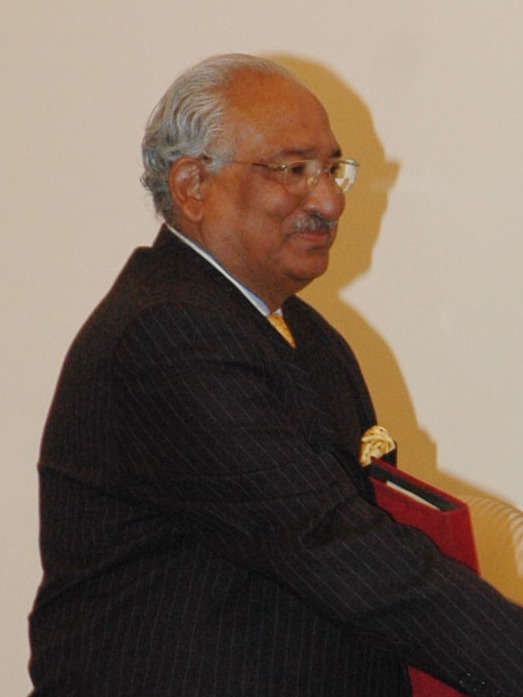
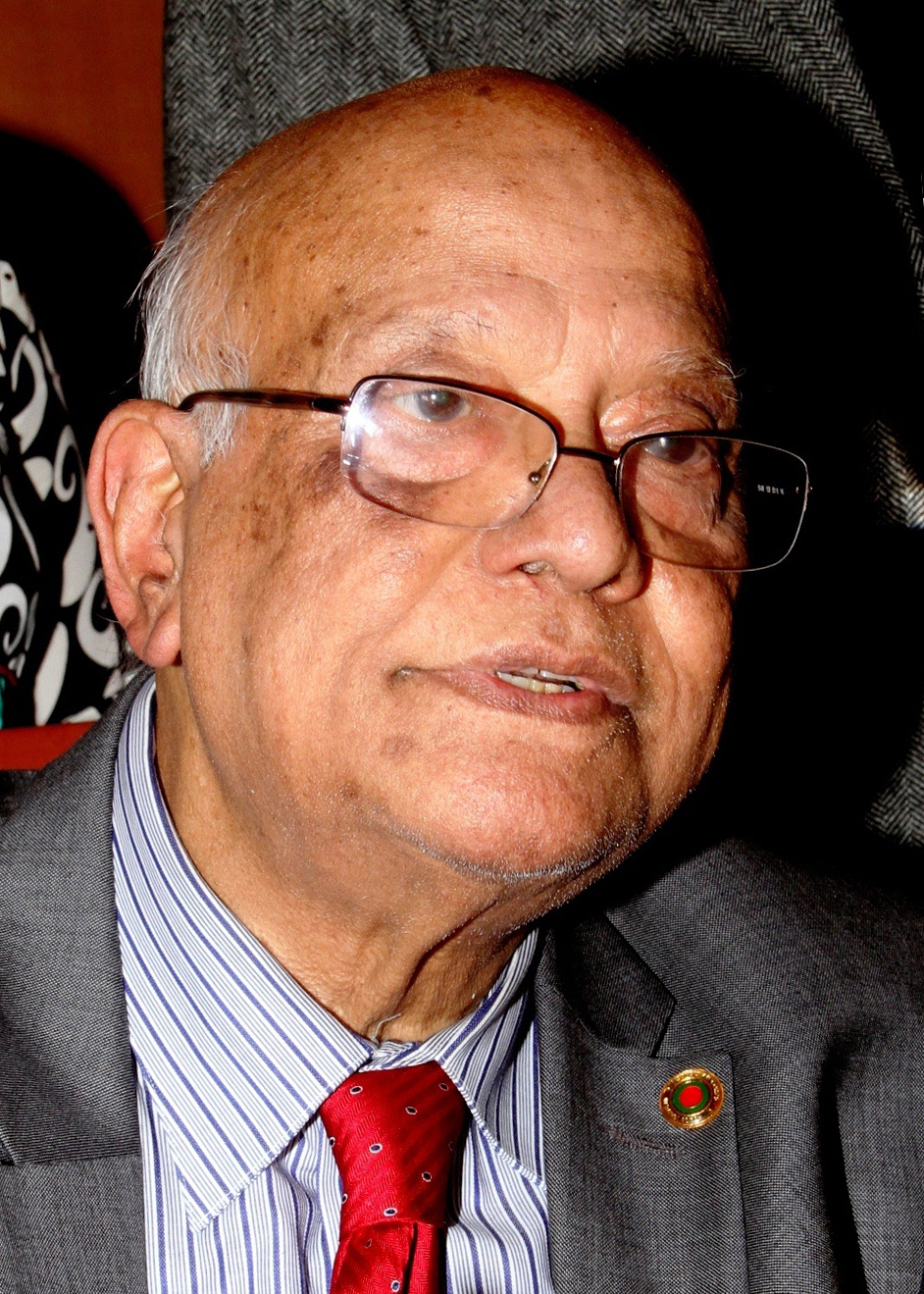
M. Saifur Rahman and AMA Muhith each presented the highest number of budgets, with 12 budgets delivered during their respective tenures

=== Saifur Rahman (Third Tenure) ===
M Saifur Rahman, in his third term, introduced five budgets that focused on comprehensive economic reforms and addressed several key fiscal issues. His tenure saw renewed emphasis on combating black money laundering, alongside reforms that included mandatory submission of tax returns for election candidates and those participating in government tenders. The scope of VAT collection was expanded, and the tax-free income limit was increased to ৳0.15 million. Additionally, the infrastructure development surcharge of 4% was removed, aiming to reduce the financial burden on businesses and consumers.

=== Mirza Azizul Islam ===
During the 1/11 changeover in 2007, when the military assumed control under a caretaker government, two budgets were presented. The budgets focused on several key reforms: the VAT net was expanded, and the tax-free income limit was increased to ৳0.15 lakh. The 4% infrastructure development surcharge was abolished, and changes were made to the tariff structure to support local industries. A new system of tax holidays was introduced, and corporate tax rates were reduced. AB Mirza Azizul Islam presented the budget of ৳99,962 crore for both the 2007-08 and 2008-09 fiscal years.

=== A M A Muhith (Second Tenure) ===
Abul Maal Abdul Muhith presented ten consecutive budgets during this period. Key measures introduced in these budgets included: the opportunity to legalize undisclosed income with a 10% tax, promotion of Public-Private Partnerships (PPP), taxation on savings certificate interest, a 2% surcharge on mobile phone bills, and an increase in the tax-free income limit to ৳220,000. Additionally, tax holiday benefits were extended by two years, and a 30% tax rate was applied to incomes exceeding ৳4.42 million. Requirements were introduced for paying house rent exceeding ৳25,000 through banks, imposing a 1% apparel source tax, and a mandatory surcharge for owning two cars or house properties larger than 8,000 square feet.

=== Mustafa Kamal ===
Mustafa Kamal presented four budgets amid global economic instability, and the COVID-19 pandemic. Kamal's budgets focused on strengthening the country's economy with several key measures: incentives for young entrepreneurs and remittance, enhancements in emergency healthcare, the abolition of the minimum surcharge system, and provisions for the legalization of black and laundered money. These initiatives are part of the broader goal to transition towards a “Smart Bangladesh.” Kamal presented his final budget during a period of global economic recession and post-pandemic recovery, with growing inflation and concerns about foreign currency reserves.

=== Abul Hassan Mahmood Ali ===
Abul Hassan Mahmood Ali presented the 2024-25 budget with a strong focus on addressing agricultural development, energy sector reforms, and healthcare enhancements amid ongoing economic challenges. The budget highlights a 40% increase in the agricultural development budget, a shift in priorities within the energy sector towards immediate infrastructure needs, and a 9% rise in healthcare spending. Additionally, it introduces tax reforms, including an increased tax rate for individual taxpayers, and measures to expand the net VAT.

=== Salehuddin Ahmed ===
Finance Adviser Salehuddin Ahmed presented a ৳7.90 trillion national budget for the 2025–26 fiscal year, the first under the post-July Uprising interim administration. Slightly lower than the previous year's budget, the plan established a total revenue collection target of ৳5.64 trillion (roughly 9% of GDP), expecting ৳4.99 trillion from the National Board of Revenue and ৳65,000 crore from non-tax sources. However, the proposal faced widespread critique from independent organizations for maintaining structural continuity with the outgoing Awami League administration's fiscal framework. The Centre for Policy Dialogue (CPD) argued that the stated philosophy of creating an "inequality-free society" lacked practical implementation, while economist Fahmida Khatun highlighted concerning cuts to the Annual Development Programme in education, health, and agriculture.

=== Amir Khosru Mahmud Chowdhury ===
Amir Khosru Mahmud Chowdhury presented a record ৳9.38 trillion national budget for the 2026–27 fiscal year. The budget set an overall revenue mobilization target of ৳6.95 trillion. The plan expects ৳6.04 trillion from the National Board of Revenue, ৳25,000 crore from non-NBR tax sectors, and ৳66,000 crore from non-tax revenue sources.

== Timeline of the budget presenters ==
AMA Muhith and M Saifur Rahman each presented the highest number of budgets in Bangladesh's history, with 12 budgets delivered during their respective tenures. Muhith stands out as the first finance minister to present a budget for ten consecutive fiscal years, from 2009 until his retirement at the end of the 11th Parliament.

== List of National Budgets ==
Fiscal Year	Placed by	Total Size (In Taka)	Annual development programme (ADP)	Government
1972-73	Tajuddin Ahmed	7,860,000,000	5,010,000,000	Mujib II
1973-74	Tajuddin Ahmed	9,950,000,000	5,250,000,000	Mujib III
1974-75	Tajuddin Ahmed	10,840,000,000	5,250,000,000	Mujib IV
1975-76	Dr. Azizur Rahman Mallik	15,490,000,000	9,500,000,000	Mujib IV
1976-77	Ziaur Rahman	19,890,000,000	12,220,000,000	Sayem
1977-78	Ziaur Rahman	21,840,000,000	12,780,000,000	Zia
1978-79	Ziaur Rahman	24,990,000,000	14,460,000,000	Zia
1979-80	Mirza Nurul Huda	33,170,000,000	21,230,000,000	Zia
1980-81	Saifur Rahman	41,080,000,000	27,000,000,000	Zia
1981-82	Saifur Rahman	46,770,000,000	30,150,000,000	Sattar
1982-83	AMA Muhith	47,380,000,000	27,000,000,000	Ershad
1983-84	AMA Muhith	58,960,000,000	34,830,000,000	Ershad
1984-85	Sayeduzzaman	66,990,000,000	38,960,000,000	Ershad
1985-86	Sayeduzzaman	71,380,000,000	38,250,000,000	Ershad
1986-87	Sayeduzzaman	85,040,000,000	47,640,000,000	Ershad
1987-88	Sayeduzzaman	85,270,000,000	50,460,000,000	Ershad
1988-89	Abdul Munim	105,650,000,000	53,150,000,000	Ershad
1989-90	Wahidul Haq	127,030,000,000	58,030,000,000	Ershad
1990-91	Abdul Munim	129,600,000,000	56,680,000,000	Ershad
1991-92	Saifur Rahman	155,840,000,000	75,000,000,000	Khaleda I
1992-93	Saifur Rahman	176,070,000,000	90,570,000,000	Khaleda I
1993-94	Saifur Rahman	190,500,000,000	97,500,000,000	Khaleda I
1994-95	Saifur Rahman	209,480,000,000	110,000,000,000	Khaleda I
1995-96	Saifur Rahman	231,700,000,000	121,000,000,000	Khaleda I
1996-97	Shah A M S Kibria	246,030,000,000	125,000,000,000	Hasina I
1997-98	Shah A M S Kibria	277,860,000,000	128,000,000,000	Hasina I
1998-99	Shah A M S Kibria	295,370,000,000	136,000,000,000	Hasina I
1999-00	Shah A M S Kibria	342,520,000,000	124,770,000,000	Hasina I
2000-01	Shah A M S Kibria	385,240,000,000	175,000,000,000	Hasina I
2001-02	Shah A M S Kibria	423,060,000,000	190,000,000,000	Hasina I
2002-03	Saifur Rahman	448,540,000,000	192,000,000,000	Khaleda III
2003-04	Saifur Rahman	519,800,000,000	203,000,000,000	Khaleda III
2004-05	Saifur Rahman	572,480,000,000	220,000,000,000	Khaleda III
2005-06	Saifur Rahman	610,580,000,000	236,260,000,000	Khaleda III
2006-07	Saifur Rahman	697,400,000,000	260,000,000,000	Khaleda III
2007-08	Mirza Azizul Islam	999,620,000,000	256,000,000,000	Iajuddin
2008-09	Mirza Azizul Islam	999,620,000,000	254,000,000,000	Fakhruddin
2009-10	AMA Muhith	1,138,150,000,000	285,000,000,000	Hasina II
2010-11	AMA Muhith	1,321,700,000,000	351,300,000,000	Hasina II
2011-12	AMA Muhith	1,612,140,000,000	410,800,000,000	Hasina II
2012-13	AMA Muhith	1,917,380,000,000	523,660,000,000	Hasina II
2013-14	AMA Muhith	2,224,910,000,000	600,000,000,000	Hasina II
2014-15	AMA Muhith	2,505,600,000,000	750,000,000,000	Hasina III
2015-16	AMA Muhith	2,951,000,000,000	938,940,000,000	Hasina III
2016-17	AMA Muhith	3,406,050,000,000	1,107,000,000,000	Hasina III
2017-18	AMA Muhith	4,002,660,000,000	1,483,810,000,000	Hasina III
2018-19	AMA Muhith	4,645,730,000,000	1,730,000,000,000	Hasina III
2019-20	Mustafa Kamal	5,231,900,000,000	2,027,210,000,000	Hasina IV
2020-21	Mustafa Kamal	5,680,000,000,000	2,051,450,000,000	Hasina IV
2021-22	Mustafa Kamal	6,036,810,000,000	2,253,240,000,000	Hasina IV
2022-23	Mustafa Kamal	6,780,640,000,000	2,460,660,000,000	Hasina IV
2023-24	Mustafa Kamal	7,617,850,000,000	2,630,000,000,000	Hasina IV
2024-25	Abul Hassan Mahmood Ali	7,970,000,000,000	2,650,000,000,000	Hasina V
2025-26	Salehuddin Ahmed	7,900,000,000,000	2,300,000,000,000	Yunus
2026-27	Amir Khosru Mahmud Chowdhury	9,380,000,000,000	3,000,000,000,000	Tarique

== See also ==
- Economy of Bangladesh
- Ministry of Finance (Bangladesh)
- Bangladeshi taka
