= Comilla-10 =

Constituency of Bangladesh's Jatiya Sangsad

Coordinates: 23.16°N 91.20°E

- Constituency for the Jatiya Sangsad
- District: Comilla District
- Division: Chittagong Division
- Electorate: 536,227 (2026)

Current constituency
- Created: 1973
- Party: Bangladesh Nationalist Party
- Member: Md. Mobasher Alam Bhuiyan
- ← 257 Comilla-9 259 Comilla-11 →

Comilla-10 is a constituency represented in the Jatiya Sangsad (National Parliament) of Bangladesh since 2026 by Md. Mobasher Alam Bhuiyan of the Bangladesh Nationalist Party.

== Boundaries ==
The constituency encompasses Lalmai, and Nangalkot upazilas.

== History ==
The constituency was created for the first general elections in newly independent Bangladesh, held in 1973.

Ahead of the 2014 general election, the Election Commission expanded the boundaries of the constituency to include all of Comilla Sadar Dakshin Upazila. Previously it had excluded Comilla Dakshin Municipality and the upazila's six northernmost union parishads: Bara Para, Bijoypur, Chouara, Galiara, Purba Jorekaran, and Paschim Jorekaran.

Ahead of the 2018 general election, the Election Commission expanded the boundaries of the constituency by adding Lalmai Upazila, which had been created in 2017 from union parishads of Comilla Sadar Upazila and Laksam Upazila.

== Members of Parliament ==
Election	Member	Party
1973	Wali Ahmed	Awami League
1979	Redwan Ahmed	Bangladesh Nationalist Party
Major Boundary Changes
1986	Rafiqul Hossain	Jatiya Party
1988	Saiful Islam	Bangladesh Nationalist Party
1991	ATM Alamgir	Bangladesh Nationalist Party
Jun 1996	Md. Tajul Islam	Awami League
2001	Anwarul Azim	Bangladesh Nationalist Party
2008	Mustafa Kamal	Awami League
2014	Mustafa Kamal	Awami League
2018	Mustafa Kamal	Awami League
2024	Mustafa Kamal	Awami League
2026	Md. Mobasher Alam Bhuiyan	Bangladesh Nationalist Party

== Elections ==
=== Elections in the 2020s ===
General Election 2026: Comilla-10
Party	Candidate	Votes	%	±%
BNP	Md. Mobasher Alam Bhuiyan	163,667		N/A
Jamaat	Muhammad Yasin Arafath	123,733		N/A
Majority		39,934		N/A
Turnout				N/A
BNP gain from AL				

=== Elections in the 2010s ===
Mustafa Kamal was re-elected unopposed in the 2014 general election after opposition parties withdrew their candidacies in a boycott of the election.

=== Elections in the 2000s ===
General Election 2008: Comilla-10
Party	Candidate	Votes	%	±%
AL	Mustafa Kamal	138,089	59.7	+21.7
BNP	Mobasher Alam Bhuiyan	89,821	38.8	−19.3
IAB	Md. Gajiul Haque Mazumder	1,298	0.6	N/A
NPP	M. Ahidur Rahman	999	0.4	N/A
BNP	Abdul Gafur Bhuiyan	629	0.3	N/A
LDP	Jmirul Akhter	517	0.2	N/A
Majority		48,268	20.9	+0.8
Turnout		231,353	81.5	+11.4
AL gain from BNP				

General Election 2001: Comilla-10
Party	Candidate	Votes	%	±%
BNP	Anwarul Azim	107,769	58.1	+23.5
AL	Md. Tajul Islam	70,434	38.0	+1.3
IJOF	Golam Mostafa Kamal	6,518	3.5	N/A
JSD	Monirul Anwar	388	0.2	N/A
Independent	ATM Alamgir	256	0.1	N/A
BSD	Yasin Mia	148	0.1	N/A
Majority		37,335	20.1	+18.0
Turnout		185,513	70.1	−2.1
BNP gain from AL				

=== Elections in the 1990s ===
General Election June 1996: Comilla-10
Party	Candidate	Votes	%	±%
AL	Md. Tajul Islam	49,298	36.7	+3.6
BNP	ATM Alamgir	46,479	34.6	−1.4
Independent	Moksed Ali	23,605	17.6	N/A
Jamaat	Rezaul Karim	13,285	9.9	N/A
Independent	Golam Mostafa Kamal	708	0.5	N/A
Zaker Party	Ruhul Amin	482	0.4	N/A
NAP(B)	Mohammad Lokman Hossain	470	0.3	N/A
JSD	Monirul Anwar	168	0.1	N/A
Majority		2,819	2.1	−0.8
Turnout		134,495	72.2	+30.2
AL gain from BNP				

General Election 1991: Comilla-10
Party	Candidate	Votes	%	±%
BNP	ATM Alamgir	36,658	36.0	
AL	Khorshed Alam Suruz	33,709	33.1	
Jamaat	Md. Abdur Rab Patwari	16,151	15.9	
JP(E)	Habibur Rahman Mazumdar	12,883	12.7	
Zaker Party	Moktar Ahmed	793	0.8	
IOJ	A K M Ruhul Amin Chowdhury	591	0.6	
WPB	Shuvas Bhoumik	584	0.6	
NAP(B)	Jinnat Ali	469	0.5	
Majority		2,949	2.9	
Turnout		101,838	42.0	
BNP gain from				
