= IBSS =

IBSS may refer to:

- International Bibliography of the Social Sciences
- Independent basic service set, in wireless computer networking
- International Business School of Scandinavia, a business school in Denmark
- International Business School Suzhou, the Xi'an Jiaotong–Liverpool University business school in Suzhou, China
