= Abul Kalam Mazumdar =

Bangladeshi politician

Principal Abul Kalam Mazumdar

Member of the Bangladesh Parliament for Comilla-18
- In office 7 April 1973 – 6 November 1976
- Preceded by: seat start
- Succeeded by: Nurur Rahman

Member of the Bangladesh Parliament for Comilla-9
- In office 10 July 1986 – 7 December 1987
- Preceded by: A. K. M. Abu Zahed
- Succeeded by: Monirul Haq Chowdhury

Personal details
- Born: 25 August 1945 Comilla, British India
- Died: 31 October 1994 (aged 49) Holy Family Hospital, Dhaka
- Party: Bangladesh Awami League
- Education: Dhaka University

Principal Abul Kalam Mazumder is a Bangladeshi national politician, one of the organizers of the Bangladesh Liberation War, a social worker and a member of the Jatiya Sangsad.

== Early life ==
He was born on 25 August 1945 in Meherkul Daulatpur village of Lalmai Upazila of Comilla District. He is the son of Miyajan Majumder and Atnen Nesha Majumder. He is the youngest of five brothers and two sisters. He started his education at Daulatpur Primary School established by his father Miyajan Majumdar. Then Bagmara was admitted to high school. In 1982, he passed SSC in the first division from Dhaka Board. Then he was admitted to Comilla Victoria College. In 1984, he passed HSC, securing 14th position in the merit list. In 1969, he obtained an Honors master's degree in economics from Dhaka University.

== Career ==
After graduation, he became the head teacher at Nazrol Academy (Pipulia). In 1970, he paid close attention to politics. He played a key role in the 1970 elections. He took part in the liberation war from the role of organizer in the Bangladesh Liberation War of 1971. In 1983, he was the chief of the Comilla district of Brihaur of the volunteer force. He was elected as a Member of Parliament in 1973 and later in 1986 as a candidate of Awami League. He participated in the 1991 elections. His speech in Parliament introduced him anew. At that time he became the national leader in the movement against the dictator Hussain Muhammad Ershad on the streets and in the parliament. He was the convener of Comilla district 15 party in the anti-Ershad movement. He was a member of the Bangladesh Awami League Executive Council. He was a member of the Education Commission of the Government of Bangladesh. He was the General Secretary of the Red Crescent Society and represented Bangladesh at a seminar in London. Served as the Director of the Central Committee of the Cooperative Federation, Lalmai Degree College, Bagmara Women's College, Bagmara Girls High School, Daulatpur High School and many other educational institutions in Comilla district. Towards the end of his life, Abul Kalam Majumdar sowed the seeds for the establishment of a women's college, Kalam Majumdar.

Mazumdar was elected to parliament from Comilla-9 as a Bangladesh Awami League candidate in 1986.

== Death ==
Mazumdar died on 31 October 1994.
