= Md. Tazul Islam =

Bangladeshi politician

- মোঃ তাজুল ইসলাম
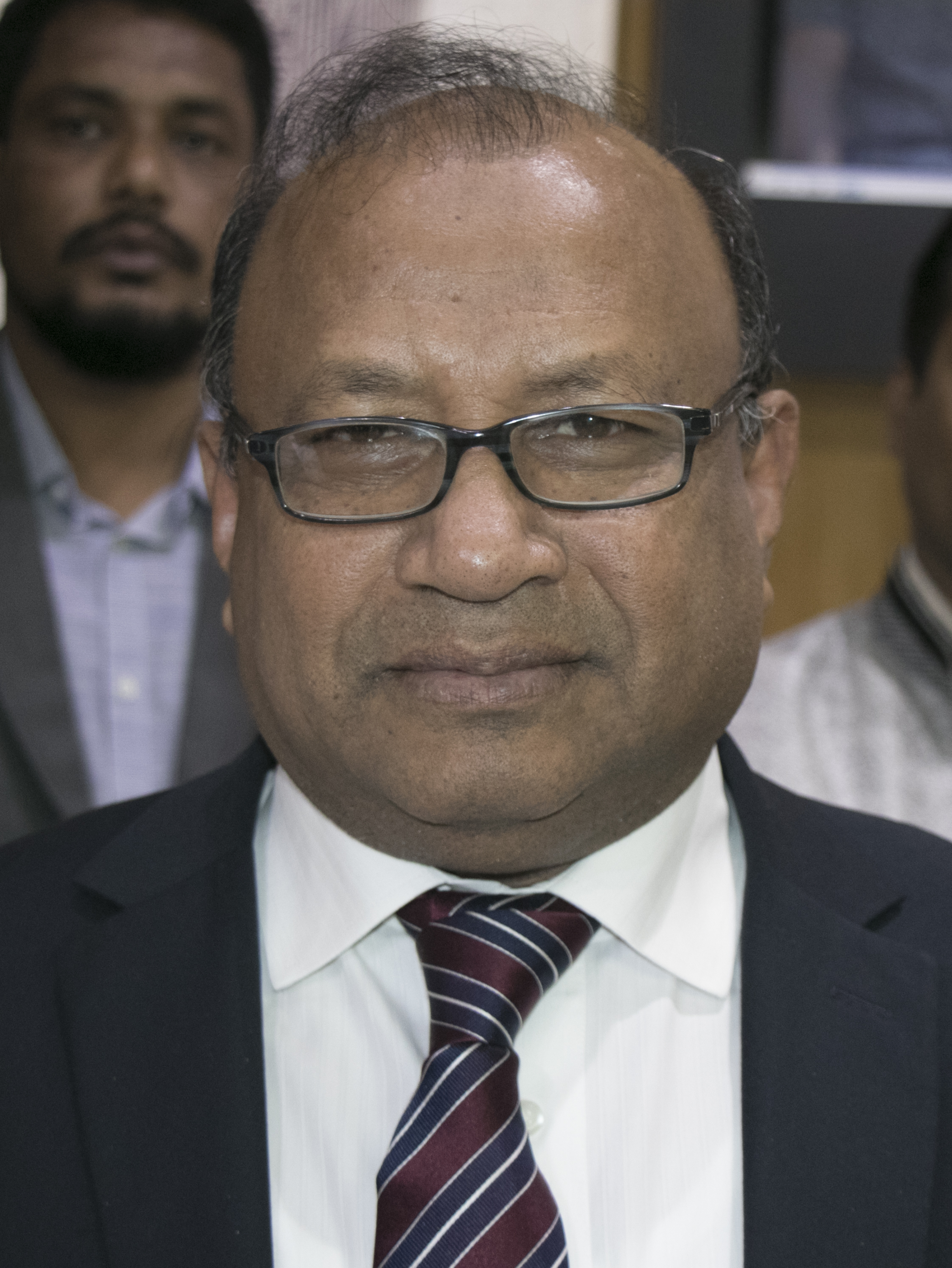
- Tazul in 2018

Minister of Local Government and Rural Development and Co-operatives
- In office 7 January 2019 – 6 August 2024
- Prime Minister: Sheikh Hasina
- Deputy: Kazi Abdul Wadud Dara
- Preceded by: Khandaker Mosharraf Hossain

Member of the Bangladesh Parliament for Comilla-9
- In office 29 December 2008 – 6 August 2024
- Preceded by: Monirul Haq Chowdhury

Member of the Bangladesh Parliament for Comilla-10
- In office 14 July 1996 – 13 July 2001
- Preceded by: ATM Alamgir
- Succeeded by: Anwarul Azim

Personal details
- Born: 30 June 1955 (age 70) Comilla District, East Bengal, Dominion of Pakistan
- Party: Bangladesh Awami League
- Education: MBA

Mohammad Tazul Islam (born 30 June 1955) is a Bangladesh Awami League politician and a former member of Jatiya Sangsad representing the Comilla-9 constituency. In January 2024, he is a former Minister of Local Government and Rural Development, succeeding the 2019 election where he held the same position.

== Early life ==
Tazul Islam was born on 30 June 1955 in the village of Pomgaon in Laksam, Comilla District, East Bengal (now under Monoharganj Upazila, Bangladesh). He was the eldest of the three sons and four daughters of Zulfiqar Ali and Anwara Begum. Islam studied at the Pomgaon Government Primary School and Pomgaon High School. He then went onto study at the Nawab Faizunnesa Government College, before enrolling at the University of Chittagong where he earned his BA. Islam obtained an MBA in marketing from Southern University, Bangladesh and an MBA in finance from the International Business School of Scandinavia, respectively.

== Career ==
Islam was elected from Comilla-9 ( Laksam-Monohorgonj ) constituency as a member of parliament in 1996, 2008, 2014, 2018, and most recently in 2024. After the 2024 general election, the Hon'ble Prime Minister appointed him as the Minister for Local Government, Rural Development and Cooperatives for a second consecutive term.

As a long-serving parliamentarian, Islam worked with the standing committee of Home, Planning, and Finance Ministry as a member and worked as Chairman of standing committee of Power and Energy from 2014 to 2018.

== Personal life ==
He is married to Fauzia Islam. The couple had 2 daughters and 2 sons.
