= Comilla-9 =

Constituency of Bangladesh's Jatiya Sangsad

Coordinates: 23.24°N 91.12°E

- Constituency for the Jatiya Sangsad
- District: Comilla District
- Division: Chittagong Division
- Electorate: 478,535 (2026)

Current constituency
- Created: 1973
- Party: Bangladesh Nationalist Party
- Member: Md. Abul Kalam
- ← 256 Comilla-8 258 Comilla-10 →

Comilla-9 is a constituency represented in the Jatiya Sangsad (National Parliament) of Bangladesh since 2026 by Md. Abul Kalam of the Bangladesh Nationalist Party.

== Boundaries ==
The constituency encompasses Laksam and Manoharganj upazilas.

== History ==
The constituency was created for the first general elections in newly independent Bangladesh, held in 1973.

Ahead of the 2008 general election, the Election Commission redrew constituency boundaries to reflect population changes revealed by the 2001 Bangladesh census. The 2008 redistricting altered the boundaries of the constituency.

== Members of Parliament ==
Election	Member	Party
1973	Khandaker Mushtaq Ahmed	Awami League
1979	A. K. M. Abu Zahed	Bangladesh Nationalist Party
1986	Abul Kalam Mazumdar	Awami League
1988	Monirul Haq Chowdhury	Jatiya Party
1991	Monirul Haq Chowdhury	Jatiya Party
Feb 1996	Amin ur Rashid Yasin	Bangladesh Nationalist Party
Jun 1996	A. H. M. Mustafa Kamal	Awami League
2001	Monirul Haq Chowdhury	Bangladesh Nationalist Party
2008	Tazul Islam	Awami League
2014	Tazul Islam	Awami League
2018	Tazul Islam	Awami League
2024	Tazul Islam	Awami League
2026	Md. Abul Kalam	Bangladesh Nationalist Party

== Elections ==
=== Elections in the 2020s ===
General election 2026: Comilla-9
Party	Candidate	Votes	%	±%
BNP	Md. Abul Kalam	170,008	56.07	+56.07
Jamaat	Syed A. K. M. Sarowar Uddin Seddique	118,961	39.23	+36.93
Majority		51,047	16.84	−69.26
Turnout		303,208	63.36	+8.86
Registered electors		478,535		
BNP gain from AL				

=== Elections in the 2010s ===
General Election 2014: Comilla-9
Party	Candidate	Votes	%	±%
AL	Tazul Islam	163,195	93.0	+43.8
JP(E)	Md. Golam Mostofa Kamal	12,192	7.0	N/A
Majority		151,003	86.1	+85.9
Turnout		175,387	54.5	−36
AL hold				

=== Elections in the 2000s ===
General Election 2008: Comilla-9
Party	Candidate	Votes	%	±%
AL	Tazul Islam	117,748	49.2	+4.0
BNP	Anwarul Azim	117,290	49.0	−4.7
IAB	Salim Mahmud	2,230	0.9	N/A
BKA	Md. Ismail	761	0.3	N/A
Bangladesh Kalyan Party	Mostak Hosen	731	0.3	N/A
Independent	Md. Ayub Ali	630	0.3	N/A
Majority		458	0.2	−8.3
Turnout		239,390	90.5	+15.4
AL gain from BNP				

General Election 2001: Comilla-9
Party	Candidate	Votes	%	±%
BNP	Monirul Haq Chowdhury	78,622	53.7	+51.0
AL	A. H. M. Mustafa Kamal	66,175	45.2	−6.1
IJOF	Saif Uddin Ahmmad	496	0.3	N/A
JSD	Munsi Faruk Ahmed	268	0.2	N/A
Gano Forum	M. A. Matin	225	0.2	−0.2
Independent	Abul Kasem	214	0.1	N/A
NAP (Bhashani)	Md. Rustam Ali Maishan	209	0.1	−0.1
Independent	Md. Rashid	104	0.1	N/A
Quran Sunnah Bastabayan Parishad	Md. Mostafa Kamal	77	0.1	0.0
Independent	Golam Mohiuddin	74	0.1	N/A
Majority		12,447	8.5	−0.1
Turnout		146,464	75.1	−0.1
BNP gain from AL				

=== Elections in the 1990s ===
General Election June 1996: Comilla-9
Party	Candidate	Votes	%	±%
AL	A. H. M. Mustafa Kamal	57,195	51.3	+13.3
JP(E)	Monirul Haq Chowdhury	47,570	42.7	−4.3
BNP	Syed Matiul Islam	3,010	2.7	−8.3
Jamaat	Mostofa Kamal Bhuiyan	2,602	2.3	N/A
Gano Forum	Md. Abdul Matin	430	0.4	N/A
NAP (Bhashani)	Md. Rustam Ali Maishan	238	0.2	N/A
Zaker Party	Fate Ali Member	212	0.2	−0.5
IOJ	Md. Siddiqur Rahman	97	0.1	N/A
Quran Sunnah Bastabayan Parishad	Md. Mostafa Kamal	82	0.1	N/A
Islamic Sashantantrik Andolan	Yakub	54	0.0	N/A
Jatiya Samajtantrik Dal-JSD	Munshi Faruk Ahmed	45	0.0	N/A
Majority		9,625	8.6	−0.3
Turnout		111,535	75.2	+20.2
AL gain from JP(E)				

General Election 1991: Comilla-9
Party	Candidate	Votes	%	±%
JP(E)	Monirul Haq Chowdhury	42,746	47.0	
AL	Abul Kalam Mazumdar	34,612	38.0	
BNP	Rabeya Khatun Chowdhury	10,017	11.0	
Bangladesh Janata Party	Abdur Razzak	2,219	2.4	
Zaker Party	Fazal Khan	675	0.7	
NAP (Muzaffar)	Joinal Abedin	386	0.4	
Bangladesh Muslim League (Kader)	Abdur Rahman Mazumdar	351	0.4	
Majority		8,134	8.9	
Turnout		91,006	55.0	
JP(E) hold				
