= Fahmida Khatun =

Fahmida Khatun may refer to:

- Fahmida Khatun (singer), Bangladeshi singer
- Fahmida Khatun (economist), Bangladeshi economist
