= Amin ur Rashid Yasin =

Bangladeshi politician

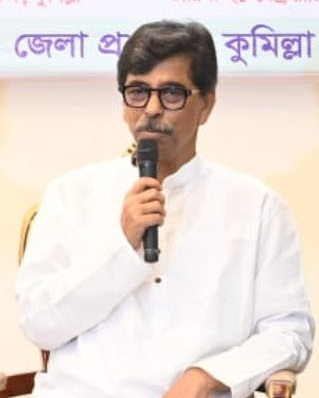
- Yasin 2026

Minister of Agriculture
- Incumbent
- Assumed office 17 February 2026
- Prime Minister: Tarique Rahman
- Preceded by: Jahangir Alam Chowdhury

Minister of Fisheries and Livestock
- Incumbent
- Assumed office 17 February 2026
- Prime Minister: Tarique Rahman
- Preceded by: Farida Akhter

Minister of Food
- In office 17 February – 25 March 2026
- Prime Minister: Tarique Rahman
- Preceded by: Ali Imam Majumder
- Succeeded by: Afroza Khanam Rita

Member of the Bangladesh Parliament for Comilla-9
- In office 19 March 1996 – 30 March 1996
- Preceded by: Monirul Haq Chowdhury
- Succeeded by: Mustafa Kamal

Personal details
- Born: 23 January 1958 (age 68) Comilla, East Pakistan, Pakistan
- Party: Bangladesh Nationalist Party

Amin ur Rashid Yasin (born 23 January 1958) widely known as Haji Yasin, is a Bangladeshi politician, businessman and exporter. He is a politician of the Bangladesh Nationalist Party and the incumbent minister of food, agriculture, fisheries and livestock since February 2026.

== Early life and education ==
He was born on 23 January 1958 in Comilla District, East Pakistan (now Bangladesh). His father was Ali Mia, and his mother is Amena Begum.

== Career ==
Yasin served as the chairman of Lalmai Group. He served as managing director/director of Lalmai Footwear Limited, Arku Industries Manufacturing Limited, Baby Nutrition Limited, Lalmai Food Products, Organic Nutrition Limited (Functional Food) and Arku Foods Limited.

Yasin is a member of the Chairperson's Advisory Council of BNP, joint secretary for agriculture affairs (2010-2016), relief and rehabilitation affairs secretary (2016–2025) and a member of the national Executive Committee (2001-2009), convener (2022–2025) and general secretary (2009–2022) of Comilla South District BNP.

Yasin was elected to Jatiya Sangsad, representing the Comilla-9 (Sadar South–Lalmai Upazila) constituency as a Bangladesh Nationalist Party candidate in February 1996. He failed to win the same constituency contested in the 2008 and 2018 Bangladeshi general elections.

== Personal life ==
Yasin is married to Musammat Tahmina Akter. They have two sons, Iftekhar Rashid and Anayet Rashid.
