= Shakpur Union =

Place in Chittagong Division, Bangladesh

Shakpur Union শাকপুর ইউনিয়ন
- 7 no. Shakpur Union Parishad
- Location within Bangladesh
- Coordinates: 23°21′N 91°2′E
- Country: Bangladesh
- Division: Chittagong Division
- District: Comilla District
- Sub-district: Barura Upazila
- Time zone: UTC+6 (Eastern Standard Time)
- Postal code: 3560

Shakpur (Bengali: শাকপুর ইউনিয়ন) is a union parishad of Barura Upazila in Comilla District of Bangladesh.

== History ==
Shakpur Union was formerly known as Deora South Union.

== Geography ==
Location of Shakpur Union in the middle of Barura Upazila. It is bounded by galimpur union on the east, vauksar union on the south, adra union on the southwest, jhalam union on the west and baruda town on the north.

Area: About 3929.09 acres.

== Demographics ==
Out of 28690 people, 13600 are males, 14990 are females and the total number of voters is 12915.

== Administration ==
Shakpur union No. 7 Union Parishad under Barura Upazila. Administrative activities of this union are under Baruda police station. It is part of Comilla-6, the 256th constituency of the Jatiya Sangsad.

== Education ==
There are a total of 18 educational institutions including high schools, government primary schools, community primary schools and kindergartens.
