= Mustafizur Rahman (economist) =

- মোস্তাফিজুর রহমান
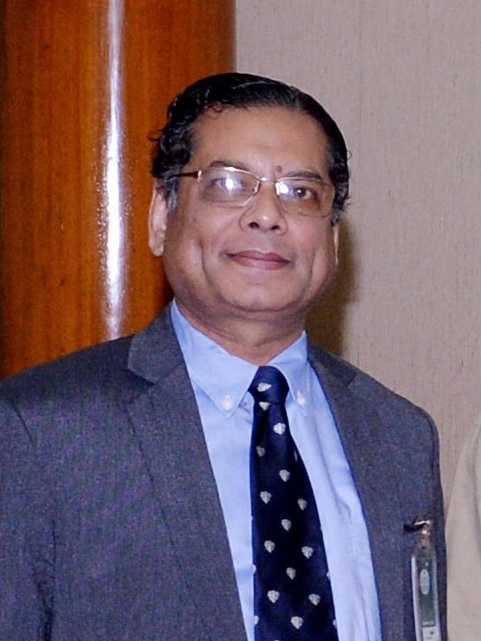
- Rahman in 2016
- Born: 31 December 1955 (age 70)
- Occupations: Economist, policy researcher
- Title: Distinguished fellow

Academic work
- Discipline: Economics
- Institutions: Centre for Policy Dialogue

Mustafizur Rahman (born: December 31, 1955) is a Bangladeshi economist and policy analyst. He serves as a Distinguished Fellow and member of the Board of Trustees at the Centre for Policy Dialogue (CPD).

== Education ==
Rahman completed his secondary and higher secondary education from Mirzapur Cadet College. He completed his master’s degree in economics from Kharkov State University and earned a PhD in development economics from Moscow State University. He has undertaken post-doctoral and visiting research at institutions including the University of Oxford, Yale University, University of Warwick, and the ISEAS – Yusof Ishak Institute.

== Career ==
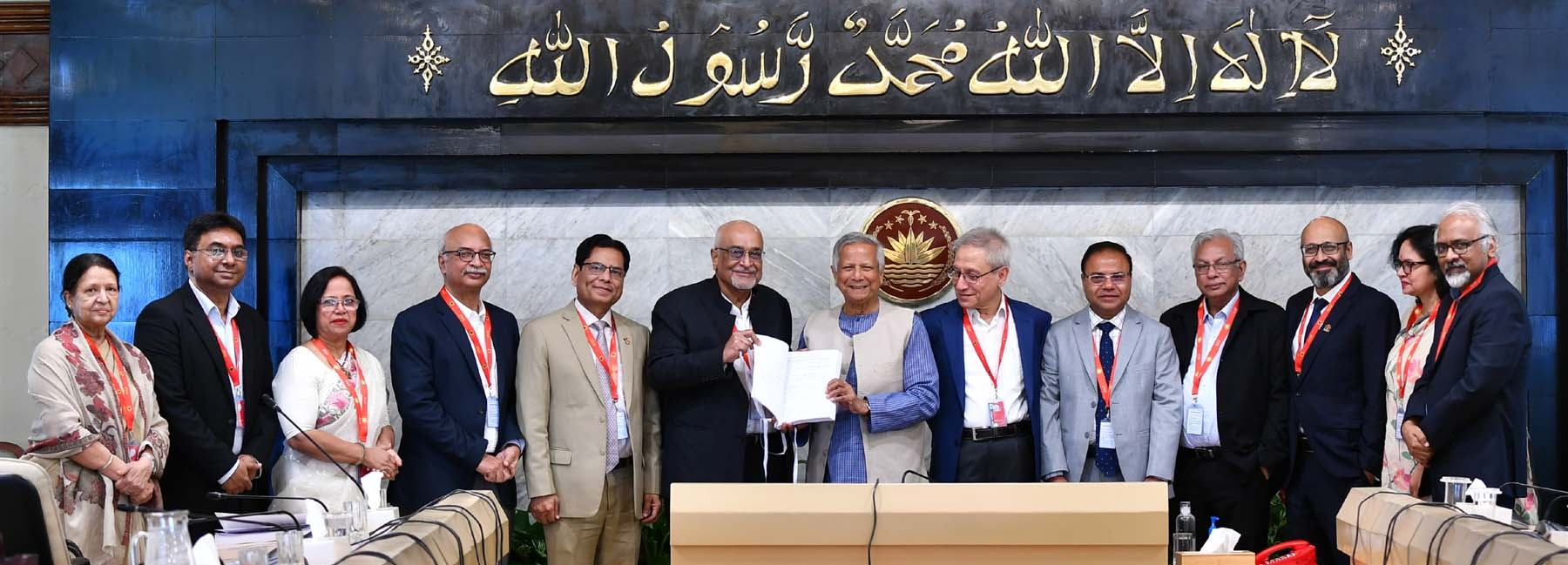
National white paper committee submits its report to Muhammad Yunus in December 2024

Rahman joined the University of Dhaka as an Assistant Professor in the Department of Accounting and Information Systems in 1986 and took voluntary retirement in 2012. He was also a member of the university's Senate. He has also been a member of the Board of Trustees and Syndicate of BRAC University.

Rahman was a founding member of the Centre for Policy Dialogue in 1993 along with Rehman Sobhan and was made the research director of the organisation in 1999.

In 2024, Rahman was appointed by the Interim government of Muhammad Yunus as a member of the National White Paper Committee, led by Debapriya Bhattacharya to evaluate the economic mismanagement of the Sheikh Hasina government and outlining a path toward reform.
