= Md. Mobasher Alam Bhuiyan =

Bangladesh politician (born 1970)

Md Mobasher Alam Bhuiyan

Member of Parliament
- Incumbent
- Assumed office 17 February 2026
- Preceded by: Mustafa Kamal
- Constituency: Comilla-10

Personal details
- Born: 2 July 1970 (age 55)
- Party: Bangladesh Nationalist Party
- Occupation: Politician

Md. Mobasher Alam Bhuiyan (born 2 July 1970) is a Bangladeshi Bangladesh Nationalist Party who is an incumbent member of Parliament from the Comilla-10 constituency.
