= Khandaker Abdul Mannan =

Bangladeshi politician

Member of Bangladesh Parliament
- In office 1986–1988
- Preceded by: Redwan Ahmed
- Succeeded by: Redwan Ahmed

Personal details
- Born: 1940 Comilla
- Died: 10 June 2020 (aged 79–80) BIRDEM
- Party: Bangladesh Freedom Party

Khandaker Abdul Mannan (1940 – 10 June 2020) is a Bangladesh Freedom Party politician and a former member of parliament for Comilla-6.

== Career ==
Mannan was elected to parliament from Comilla-6 in 1986. He contested the 1991 election as a Freedom Party candidate.
