= Manirul Haque Chowdhury =

Bangladeshi diplomat and politician

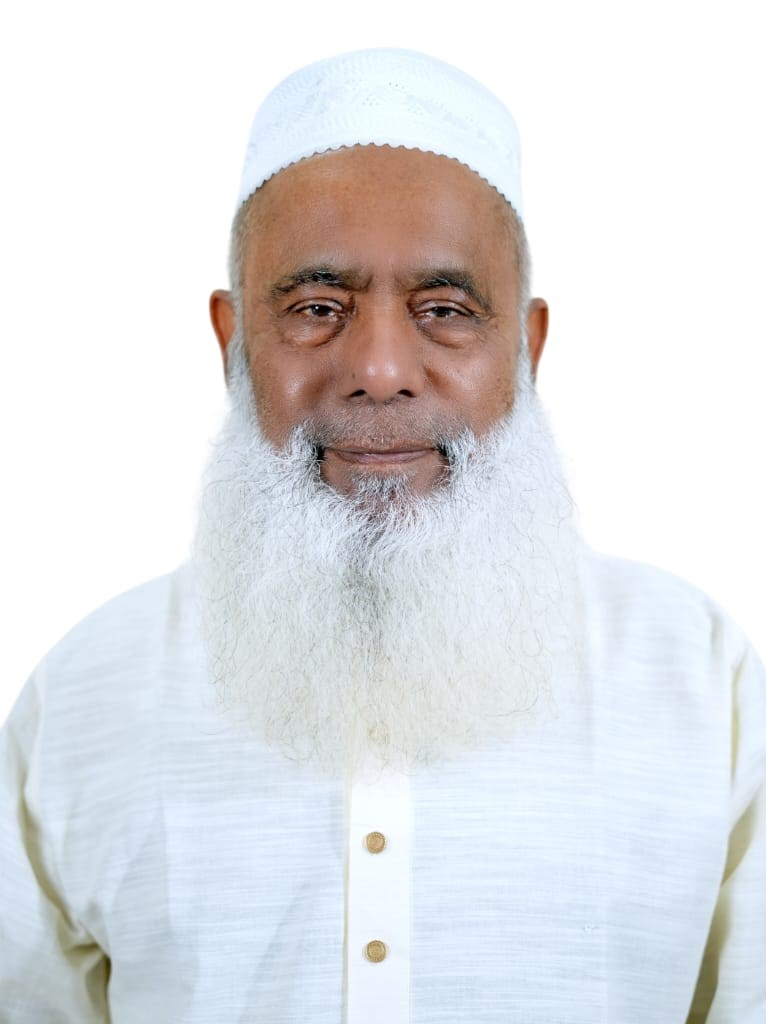
- Chowdhury in 2025

Member of Parliament
- Incumbent
- Assumed office 17 February 2026
- Preceded by: A. K. M. Bahauddin
- Constituency: Comilla-6
- In office 28 October 2001 – 27 October 2006
- Preceded by: Mustafa Kamal
- Succeeded by: Tazul Islam
- Constituency: Comilla-9
- In office 25 April 1988 – 24 November 1995
- Preceded by: Abul Kalam Mazumdar
- Succeeded by: Amin ur Rashid Yasin
- Constituency: Comilla-9

Personal details
- Born: 1946 (age 79–80) Noagram, Tipperah district, British India
- Party: Bangladesh Nationalist Party
- Other political affiliations: Jatiya Party (Ershad)

Manirul Haque Chowdhury (born 1946) is a Bangladesh Nationalist Party politician and a current member of Jatiya Sangsad for Comilla-6 He was also a member of parliament for Comilla-9.

== Biography ==
Chowdhury was born in 1946 in Noagram village of Tipperah district, British India (now in Comilla, Bangladesh). In 1968, he organised protests under Ghulam Azam's leadership.

Chowdhury was the president of the Bangladesh Chhatra League from 1974 to 1975. Later, he joined the Jatiya Party. He was elected to parliament from Comilla-9 as a Jatiya Party candidate in 1988 and 1991. He was elected to parliament from Comilla-9 as a Bangladesh Nationalist Party candidate in 2001.

Chowdhury served as the general secretary of Mohammedan SC during the late 70s and early 80s.
