= Wali Ahmed =

Bangladesh Awami League politician

Dr.Wali Ahmed

Member of Bangladesh Parliament
- In office 1973–1979
- Succeeded by: Redwan Ahmed

Personal details
- Born: BaraShalghar, Debidwar Upazilla, Cumilla
- Died: 22 October 1994 Dhanmondi, Dhaka
- Party: Bangladesh Awami League

Dr.Wali Ahmed was a Bangladesh Awami League politician and a member of parliament for Comilla-10.

== Career ==
He was the first specialist medical doctor from Cumilla. He served and treated many people in his village. Ahmed was elected to parliament from Comilla-3 as a Bangladesh Awami League candidate in 1973.

== Family and parents ==
He was from a village family. His wife's name was Farida Akhter. He had 10 sons and daughters, including Md. Shah Alam, Ruhul Amin, Md. Shafiq Alam, Ferdoose parvin, Rahmat Ullah, Faiz Ullah, Md. Nura Alam, Md. Shamsul Alam, and Farzana Akter.

== Death ==
Ahmed died on 22 October 1994.
