= Redwan Ahmed =

Bangladeshi politician

Minister of State for Liberation War Affairs
- In office 23 October 2001 – 22 May 2003
- Prime Minister: Khaleda Zia
- Succeeded by: Rezaul Karim Mannan

Member of Parliament
- In office 28 October 2001 – 27 October 2006
- Preceded by: Ali Ashraf
- Succeeded by: A. K. M. Bahauddin
- Constituency: Comilla-6
- In office 5 March 1991 – 24 November 1995
- Preceded by: Khandaker Abdul Mannan
- Succeeded by: Khandaker Abdul Mannan
- Constituency: Comilla-6
- In office 10 July 1986 – 6 December 1987
- Preceded by: Mozammel Haque
- Succeeded by: Khandaker Abdul Mannan
- Constituency: Comilla-6
- In office 2 April 1979 – 24 March 1982
- Preceded by: Wali Ahmed
- Succeeded by: Rafiqul Hossain
- Constituency: Comilla-10

Personal details
- Born: Chandina Upazila, Comilla, East Pakistan now Bangladesh
- Party: Bangladesh Nationalist Party
- Other political affiliations: Liberal Democratic Party; Jatiya Party (Ershad)
- Website: https://redwanahmed.org/

Redwan Ahmed is a Bangladeshi politician and a former state minister of liberation war affairs. He is a 4-term Jatiya Sangsad member representing the Comilla-6 and Comilla-10 constituencies.

== Early life ==
As a businessman, Ahmed served as the president of Bangladesh Garment Manufacturers and Exporters Association from 1993 to 1996. One of his notable works was signing the MOU with UNICEF and International Labour Organization for the elimination of child labour and its successful implementation.

== Career ==
Ahmed was first elected to parliament from Comilla-6 Chandina Upazila under the first Ziaur Rahman government as a candidate of Bangladesh Nationalist Party. 1979. Subsequently, he was also elected in 1986, 1991 and 2001. He served as the State Minister for Jute and Textile in 1995 and again as State Minister for Liberation War affairs in the Third Khaleda Cabinet.

Ahmed left Bangladesh Nationalist Party in 2006 and joined the Liberal Democratic Party. He is a presidium member and general secretary of the party.

== Legal issues ==
In 2023, it was announced that a Dhaka court sentenced Ahmed to three years imprisonment and a fine of Tk50 lakh for embezzling funds from the welfare association Muktijoddha Sangsad. The case involved Ahmed misappropriating Tk50 lakh from a Sonali Bank account meant for the poor and unemployed freedom fighters, and stemmed back to 2002. In 2007, the case was filed by a freedom fighter, Nurul Islam, and went through appeals. In 2008, ACC Assistant Director Mohammad Abul Hossain also submitted a charge sheet against him. Following this, he submitted a writ petition to the High Court, which the court responded to by staying the proceedings till the rule is disposed of. In 2015, the Supreme Court vacated the stay order to make way for the trial, and in 2020, the court framed charges.

Ahmed absconded following the verdict, and an arrest warrant was issued.

== Personal life ==
Ahmed is married to Momtaz Ahmed. As a philanthropist, Ahmed established Chandina Redwan Ahmed University College.
