= ATM Alamgir =

Bangladeshi politician (1950–2020)

Member of Parliament for Comilla-10
- In office 1991–1996
- Preceded by: Saiful Islam Hiru
- Succeeded by: Md. Tajul Islam

Personal details
- Born: 1950 Pakistan
- Died: 3 August 2020 (aged 70) Dhaka, Bangladesh
- Party: Jatiya Party (Ershad)

ATM Alamgir (1950 – 3 August 2020) was a Bangladeshi Jatiya Party (Ershad) politician and a Jatiya Sangsad member representing the Comilla-10 constituency as a Bangladesh Nationalist Party member.

== Career ==
Alamgir was elected to parliament from Comilla-10 as a Bangladesh Nationalist Party candidate in 1991. He left the Bangladesh Nationalist Party and joined the Jatiya Party (Ershad) on 23 April 2016.

== Death ==
Alamgir died from COVID-19 at Greenlife Medical College Hospital in Dhaka on 3 August 2020, during the COVID-19 pandemic in Bangladesh.
