= A. K. M. Abu Zahed =

Bangladeshi politician

Member of Bangladesh Parliament
- In office 1979–1982
- Preceded by: Khandaker Mushtaq Ahmed
- Succeeded by: Abul Kalam Mazumdar

Personal details
- Party: Bangladesh Nationalist Party

A. K. M. Abu Zahed is a Bangladesh Nationalist Party politician and a former member of parliament for Comilla-9.

== Career ==
Zahed was elected to parliament for Comilla-9 as a Bangladesh Nationalist Party candidate in 1979.
