= Rafiqul Hossain =

Bangladeshi politician

Member of Bangladesh Parliament
- In office 1986–1988
- Preceded by: Redwan Ahmed
- Succeeded by: Saiful Islam Hiru

Personal details
- Born: c. 1936
- Died: 10 February 2016 Dhaka, Bangladesh
- Party: Jatiya Party (Ershad)

Rafiqul Hossain (c. 1936 - 10 February 2016) was a Jatiya Party (Ershad) politician and member of parliament for Comilla-10.

== Career ==
Hossain was elected to parliament from Comilla-10 as a Jatiya Party candidate in 1986 and 1988.

== Death ==
Hossain died on 10 February 2016 in Labaid Hospital, Dhaka, Bangladesh.
