= Saiful Islam Hiru =

Bangladeshi politician

- Disappeared: 27 November 2013
- Status: Missing for 12 years, 3 months and 5 days

Member of Parliament
- In office 1988–1991
- Preceded by: Rafiqul Hossain
- Succeeded by: ATM Alamgir

Personal details
- Party: Bangladesh Nationalist Party

Saiful Islam Hiru is a Bangladeshi politician from the Bangladesh Nationalist Party and a former Member of Parliament.

== Career ==
Saiful Islam Hiru was elected to Parliament from Comilla-10 in 1988 representing Laksham. He is the president of Laksham Upazila unit of Bangladesh Nationalist Party.

== Disappearance ==
On 27 November 2013, Saiful Islam Hiru and fellow BNP politician Humayun Kabir Parvez were travelling from Laksham to Comilla on an ambulance when they disappeared. Tareque Sayeed, commanding officer of Rapid Action Battalion-11 was mentioned in the case filed by Hiru's relatives. Tareque would be arrested and sentenced to death in the Narayanganj Seven Murder case.
