= 2021 National budget of Bangladesh =

Budget of the Bangladeshi government for the fiscal year of 2021–22

2021 National Budget of Bangladesh
- • Government Seal • National Emblem
- Submitted: 3 June 2021
- Submitted by: Mustafa Kamal (Minister of Finance)
- Submitted to: Jatiya Sangsad
- Presented: 3 June 2021
- Passed: 30 June 2021
- Country: Bangladesh
- Parliament: 11th Jatiya Sangsad
- Party: Bangladesh Awami League
- Finance minister: Mustafa Kamal
- Total revenue: ৳392490 crore (US$32 billion) ▲(10.65%)
- Total expenditures: ৳603681 crore (US$50 billion) ▲(6.28%)
- Tax cuts: Numerous
- Deficit: 6.2%
- Website: mof.gov.bd

The 2021 National budget of Bangladesh was presented by the Minister of Finance Mustafa Kamal on 3 June 2021. The National budget is for the fiscal year beginning on 1 July 2021, and ending on 30 June 2022. The budget was the second to be presented amid the Coronavirus pandemic.

== History ==
The National Budget is the annual financial statement of Bangladesh; an estimate of income and expenditure of the government on a periodical basis. Under Article 87.(1) of the Constitution of Bangladesh, it is a compulsory task of the government. Upon achieving independence, the first budget of Bangladesh was presented by Tajuddin Ahmad.

== Significant announcements ==
- The total expenditure for the budget is ৳603681 crore (US$50 billion), a 6.28% increase from the previous fiscal year. This consists of ৳378357 crore (US$31 billion) allocated for operating and other expenditures, while ৳225324 crore (US$19 billion) has been allocated for the Annual Development Programme.
- The total revenue collection has been fixed at ৳392490 crore (US$32 billion), of which ৳330078 crore (US$27 billion) is due to be raised by the National Board of Revenue, while ৳16000 crore (US$1.3 billion) will be raised from non-NBR sources and ৳43000 crore (US$3.5 billion) will be supplied from non-tax sources.
- The allocation for Education is ৳71592 crore (US$5.9 billion), a 11.9% increase.
- The allocation for Health is ৳32731 crore (US$2.7 billion), a 3.8% increase.
- The allocation for Defence is ৳34842 crore (US$2.9 billion), a 8% increase.
- The allocation for climate change is ৳25124.98 crore (US$2.1 billion), an increase of 9.53%. The allocation for climate change will be spent across 25 ministries and divisions.
- 560 model Mosques of excellence at district and upazila levels, each mosque costs ৳15.62 crore (US$1.3 million) in district town or city areas, ৳13.52 crore (US$1.1 million) in upazila areas, and ৳13.61 crore (US$1.1 million) in coastal areas. The project is aiming to spread Islamic fraternity, real Islamic values and practices, conduct research, create infrastructure for prayers for both men and women, and provide religious teaching and training.

== Controversy ==
After allocating ৳15054.03 crore (US$1.2 billion) to the Ministry of Religious Affairs under the ADP for the next fiscal budget, on 29 May 2021, the Bangladesh Hindu Buddhist Christian Unity Council expressed discontent and issued a press statement terming the allocation as "a continuation of sharp discrimination against minorities" over the allocation of ৳290.08 crore (US$24 million) for religious minorities under the Annual Development Programme (ADP) of the proposed budget in the upcoming fiscal year. ৳200 crore (US$16 million) was first allocated in 2017. The organisation demanded an allocation of ৳5000 crore (US$410 million) to eradicate the discrimination minority communities have been facing over the years. They also demanded a separate ministry for religious minorities similar to India and Pakistan.

On 19 June 2021, Bangladesh Jatiya Hindu Mahajote's secretary-general Gobinda Chandra Pramanik, at Dhaka Reporters Unity, demanded the construction of at least one model temple in each of the upazilas across the country, a separate election system for the Hindu community, keeping 60 reserved seats for Hindus, the formation of a ministry for minority communities, appointing a cabinet minister from the minority community, and allowing a one-day government holiday to observe Rathajatra.
