= Anwarul Azim (politician) =

Bangladeshi politician

- আনওয়ারুল আজিম

Member of Parliament for Comilla-10
- In office 2001–2006
- Preceded by: Md. Tajul Islam
- Succeeded by: Mustafa Kamal

Personal details
- Died: 31 May 2025 (aged 77)
- Party: Bangladesh Nationalist Party

Military service
- Allegiance: Bangladesh; Pakistan (before 1971)
- Branch/service: Bangladesh Army; Pakistan Army
- Years of service: 1969–1989
- Rank: Colonel
- Unit: Corps of Electrical Mechanical Engineers
- Commands: Commandant of Electrical Mechanical Engineering Center and School; Commandant of 901st Central EME Workshop
- Battles/wars: Bangladesh Liberation War

Anwarul Azim was a Bangladesh Nationalist Party politician and a former member of parliament for the Comilla-10 constituency. He served in the Bangladesh Army at the Corps of EME and retired as a colonel.

== Career ==
Azim began his military career when he enlisted in the 2nd War Course of the Pakistan Armed Forces. After the independence of Bangladesh, he became an officer of the newly established Bangladesh Army and eventually retired as a colonel.

Following his career in the armed forces, Azim entered civilian life as a pioneer in the garment industry. From one factory, his business grew to become what is now the Alana Group, a conglomerate of ready-made garment factories with operations in Dhaka, Chittagong, and Mymensingh; it is currently headquartered in Mohakhali DOHS, Dhaka.

He was elected to parliament in 2001 from Comilla-10 as a Bangladesh Nationalist Party candidate. He contested the 2019 general elections as a candidate for the same party. His car was attacked by activists of the Bangladesh Chhatra League and Swechchhasebak League on 24 December 2015. In 2016, he was made the organizing secretary of the Comilla division unit of the Bangladesh Nationalist Party.
