= International Business School of Scandinavia =

Danish business school

International Business School of Scandinavia - IBSS Denmark is a well-known business school based in Denmark with more than 20 years experience in Higher education. Its training programs are recognized by the Danish Ministry of Science, Technology & Innovation and have been accredited by ASIC, QAHE, Global Certificate Services, ISASAHE, etc. It is a part of My Global World Education Group (MGW), headquartered in Zurich, Switzerland.

Besides IBSS Denmark, MGW also runs other well-known academies such as International Business Academy of Switzerland (IBAS) and La Xenia International Institute of Switzerland with accreditation from QS-5 star excellence, ACBSP, EDUQUA, CHEA, IACBE, etc. All programs are run in English in its campuses in Switzerland, Denmark, USA, Malaysia, Thailand, Egypt and Vietnam.

Besides the self-award degrees, IBSS Denmark together with other schools in MGW also collaborate with top leading universities such as Vern University of Applied Sciences in Croatia and Perdana University in Malaysia to award top-up double MBA and DBA degrees.

== Programs ==
IBSS offers Bachelor, Master, and Doctorate degree in Business. Its programs are a mix of theory and practice based training. In addition, its program schedule is flexible with "blended learning" approach via the modern Learning Management System (LMS). This new learning technology allows participants to join international seminars from anywhere in the world and training materials are supplied both online and during the on-site training.

== Brief history ==
IBSS history started in 2000, as a subsidiary of MGW with the aim to conduct educations and degree programs in Denmark.

In 2004 the official school was established with license from Danish Ministry of Science, Technology & Innovation, CVR-number: 28889399.

2009 IBSS initiated international presence with unique blended learning approach, supported by modern LMS. Furthermore, the school also focuses on international accreditation programs – which have not been of any need in Denmark but which are highly wanted internationally. IBSS collaborates with the a number of universities in countries such as Malaysia, UK, US, Bangladesh and Vietnam. Currently, it is funding a Ph.D study with Aalborg University on the effects of blended learning in developing countries.

IBSS major partners is Vern University of Applied Sciences in Croatia and Asia e University in Malaysia.
