= Centre for Policy Dialogue =

Research institute in Bangladesh

Centre for Policy Dialogue (CPD)
- Founded: 1993; 33 years ago in Dhaka, Bangladesh
- Founder: Rehman Sobhan
- Headquarters: House 40/C, Road No 11 (new), Dhanmondi, Dhaka, Bangladesh
- Website: cpd.org.bd

The Centre for Policy Dialogue (CPD) is a non-governmental think-tank in Bangladesh. It was established in 1993 by Rehman Sobhan, its founder chairman, with support from leading civil society institutions in Bangladesh

== History ==
In 1993, Rehman Sobhan, an economist and civil society leader in Bangladesh, founded the Centre for Policy Dialogue (CPD) to meet the emerging need for an independent civil society platform following the restoration of democracy in the early 1990s. He invited several prominent figures to join CPD’s board, which has since included globally respected personalities and social entrepreneurs, such as the late Sir Fazle Hasan Abed, founder of BRAC, and Nobel Laureate Professor Muhammad Yunus, founder of Grameen Bank.

== Key personnel ==
- Chairman: Rehman Sobhan
- Executive Director: Fahmida Khatun
- Distinguished Fellow: Debapriya Bhattacharya
- Distinguished Fellow: Prof Mustafizur Rahman
- Director (Dialogue & Communication): Anisatul Fatema Yousuf
- Head, Research Division: Khondaker Golam Moazzem

== Significance ==
According to the University of Pennsylvania's 2014 Global Go To Think Tank Index Report, CPD is number 46 out of 60 in the "Top Think Tanks in Southeast Asia and the Pacific".

== See also ==
- List of institutes in Bangladesh
