= Fahmida Khatun (economist) =

Bangladeshi economist

- Education: Jahangirnagar University; University College London
- Occupation: Economist
- Awards: Anannya Top Ten Awards (2009)

Fahmida Khatun is a Bangladeshi economist who focuses on policy analysis and project management.

== Biography ==
She has completed a master's degree in economics from Jahangirnagar University, Bangladesh. She did another master's degree in environmental and natural resource economics and PhD in economics from the University College London, UK. She has done post doctoral research at the Earth Institute of Columbia University. As part of her PhD, she undertook research on "Estimating Economic Cost of Environmental Degradation and Natural Resource Depreciation in Bangladesh" under the supervision of economist David Pearce. During her post-doctoral research at Columbia University, she worked with Jeffery Sachs on ICT and SDGs, where she specifically looked into financial inclusion through ICT.

She is the current executive director at the Centre for Policy Dialogue. Prior to joining CPD Khatun was a research fellow at the Bangladesh Institute of Development Studies and held positions at the United Nations Development Programme and USAID. She was a faculty member at universities in Bangladesh and England.

== Awards ==
- Anannya Top Ten Awards (2009)

== Hobby ==
Khatun is a passionate Rabindra Sangeet singer and sings mostly for herself. In 2007, Khatun released an album titled Jokhon Prothom Dhoreche Koli, comprising Rabindra Sangeet songs.

== Works ==
=== Books ===
- Khatun, Fahmida (2006). Fish Trade Liberalisation in Bangladesh: Implications of SPS Measures and Eco-Labelling for the Export Oriented Shrimp Sector. Dhaka: Centre for Policy Dialogue. ISBN 978-984-32-3052-2.
- ——; Rahman, M.; Bhattacharya, D.; Moazzem, K. G. (2008). Gender and Trade Liberalisation in Bangladesh: The Case of Ready Made Garments. Dhaka: Centre for Policy Dialogue. OCLC 276515569.
- —— (2014). Bangladesher Arthaneeti: Bhitor O Bahir [Bangladesh Economy: Inside and Outside]. Dhaka: Centre for Policy Dialogue. ISBN 978-984-04-1634-9.
- ——; Khan, Towfiqul Islam; Pervin, Shahida; Jahan, Hosna (2015). Estimating Women's Contribution to the Economy: The Case of Bangladesh (PDF). Dhaka: Centre for Policy Dialogue. ISBN 978-984-33-9984-7.
- ——; Saadat, Syed. Youth Employment in Bangladesh: Creating Opportunities Reaping Dividends. Palgrave Macmillan. ISBN 978-981-15-1749-5. [Forthcoming 2020]

=== Chapters ===
- Khatun, F (2006). "Duty Free Quota Free Market Access for South Asian LDCs", in: Chimni, B.S., B.L. Das., S Kelegama and M Rahman (eds). South Asia Yearbook of Trade and Development 2006, Centre for Trade and Development (CENTAD), Oxfam GB, India, published by Wiley-India. ISBN 9788126511907
- Khatun, F (2007). "Bangladesh in the WTO, chapter in South Asia in the WTO", in: S Kelegama (ed) 'South Asia in the WTO', published by Sage Publications India, 2007. ISBN 9780761936145
- Khatun, F (2009). "Migrant labour and remittances in Bangladesh", in: Stoler, A. L., J. Redden and L. A. Jackson. Trade and Poverty Reduction in the Asia-pacific Region: Case Studies and Lessons from Low-income Communities. Cambridge: Cambridge University Press, 2009. pp 513–539. ISBN 9781139190404
- Khatun, F. (2012). "A Regional Outlook for Climate Finance in South Asia." In Bhattacharya, D. and Rahman, M. (eds.) Global Recovery, New Risks and Sustainable Growth: Repositioning South Asia. Dhaka: Centre for Policy Dialogue. ISBN 9789848946121
- Khatun, F. (2012). "WTO negotiations on environmental goods and services: South Asia's interests". In Kelegama, S., Adhikari, R., Sharma, P. and Kharel, P. (eds.) Regional Economic Integration: Challenges for South Asia during Turbulent Times. Kathmandu: South Asia Watch on Trade, Economics and Environment (SAWTEE) and South Asia Centre for Policy Studies (SACEPS), pp 253–268. ISBN 9789937850421
- Khatun, F. and Hossain, S. (2014). "India's Economic Rise: Implications for Bangladesh." In Joseph, M. and Jacob, H. (Eds.) India's Economic Growth: Opportunities and Challenges for the Region [Australia India Institute Foreign Policy Series 5]. New Delhi: Australia India Institute (University of Melbourne), Regional Centre for Strategic Studies (Colombo) and Manohar Publishers. ISBN 9789350980408
- Khatun, F. and Ahamad, M. (2014). "ODA to and External Debt in LDCs: Recent Trends." In Istanbul Programme of Action for the LDCs (2011–2020): Monitoring Deliverables, Tracking Progress – Analytical Perspective. London: Commonwealth Secretariat. ISBN 9781849291194
- Khatun, F. (2016). "Development Policies since Independence", in Routledge Handbook of Contemporary Bangladesh, published by Routledge | Taylor & Francis Group. ISBN 9780415734615
- Khatun, F. and Amin, M. A. (2016). "Carbon Emission, Energy Consumption, Deforestation and Agricultural Income in LDCs: Lessons for Post-2015 Development Agenda." In Southern Perspectives on the Post-2015 International Development Agenda. London and New York: Routledge. ISBN 9781138615229
- Khatun F, Shahida Pervin and Md Masudur Rahman (2018). "Bangladesh's pursuit of the 2030 Agenda: will it facilitate smooth graduation?" In Bangladesh's Graduation from the Least Developed Countries Group: Pitfalls and Promises. London: Routledge. ISBN 9780429491924
