= Lalmai Upazila =

Upazila in Bangladesh

Lalmai Upazila লালমাই
- Upazila
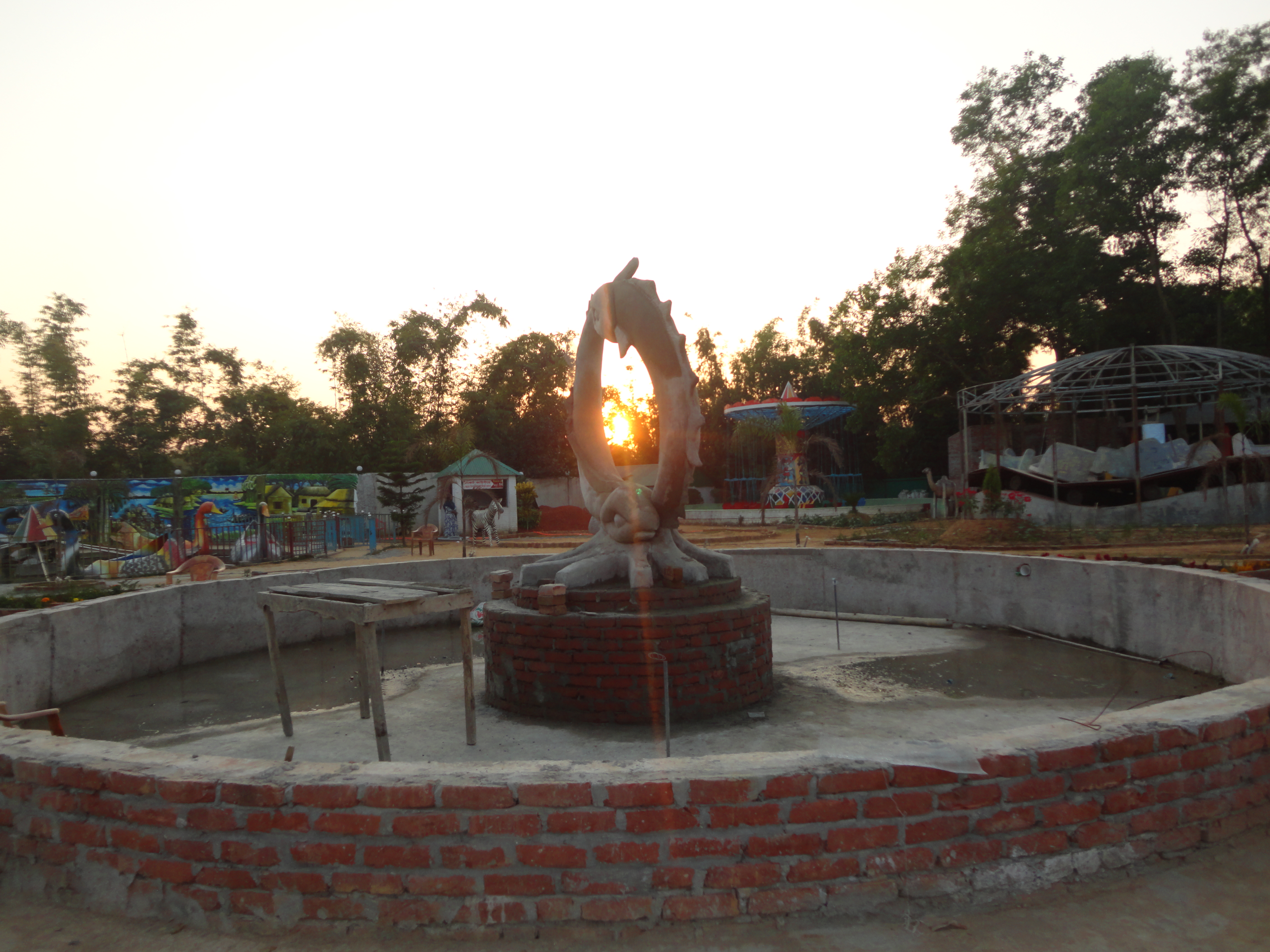
- Lalmai Lakeland Park

- Coordinates (Lalmai): 23.359°N 91.139°E
- Country: Bangladesh
- Division: District
- Chittagong: Comilla

Area
  - Total: 97.00 km^{2} (37.45 sq mi)

Population (2022)
  - Total: 215,011
  - Density: 2,217/km^{2} (5,741/sq mi)
- Website: lalmai.comilla.gov.bd

Lalmai Upazila (Bengali: লালমাই উপজেলা) is an upazila of Comilla District in the Division of Chittagong, Bangladesh. Lalmai is the 17th upazila of Cumilla District and 491st upazila of the country. It was formed on 9 January 2017 from eight union councils of Cumilla Sadar South Upazila and one of Laksam Upazila. It has a total area of 97.00 square kilometres (37.45 sq mi), and has Joynagar as its headquarters.

== Demographics ==
Religions in Lalmai Upazila (2022)
| Religion | Percent |
| Islam | 96.29% |
| Hinduism | 2.79% |
| Buddhism | 0.92% |
| Other or not stated | 0.002% |

According to the 2022 Bangladeshi census, Lalmai Upazila had 50,355 households and a population of 215,011. 11.12% of the population were under 5 years of age. Lalmai had a literacy rate (age 7 and over) of 76.08%: 76.03% for males and 76.11% for females, and a sex ratio of 83.86 males for every 100 females. 5,947 (2.77%) lived in urban areas.

According to the 2011 Census of Bangladesh, what is now Lalmai Upazila had 38,315 households and a population of 188,186. 46,849 (24.90%) were under 10 years of age. Lalmai had a literacy rate (age 7 and over) of 48.66%, compared to the national average of 51.8%, and a sex ratio of 1135 females per 1000 males. 8,181 (4.35%) lived in urban areas.

Muslims made up 180,885, Hindus 5,423 and Buddhists 1,863.

== Administrative Divisions ==
It includes the 9 union councils:

1. Bagmara North
2. Bagmara South
3. Bholain North
4. Bholain South
5. Perul North
6. Perul South
7. Belghar North
8. Belghar South
9. Bakai North
