= Comilla Adarsha Sadar Upazila =

Comilla Adarsha Sadar কুমিল্লা আদর্শ সদর
- Upazila
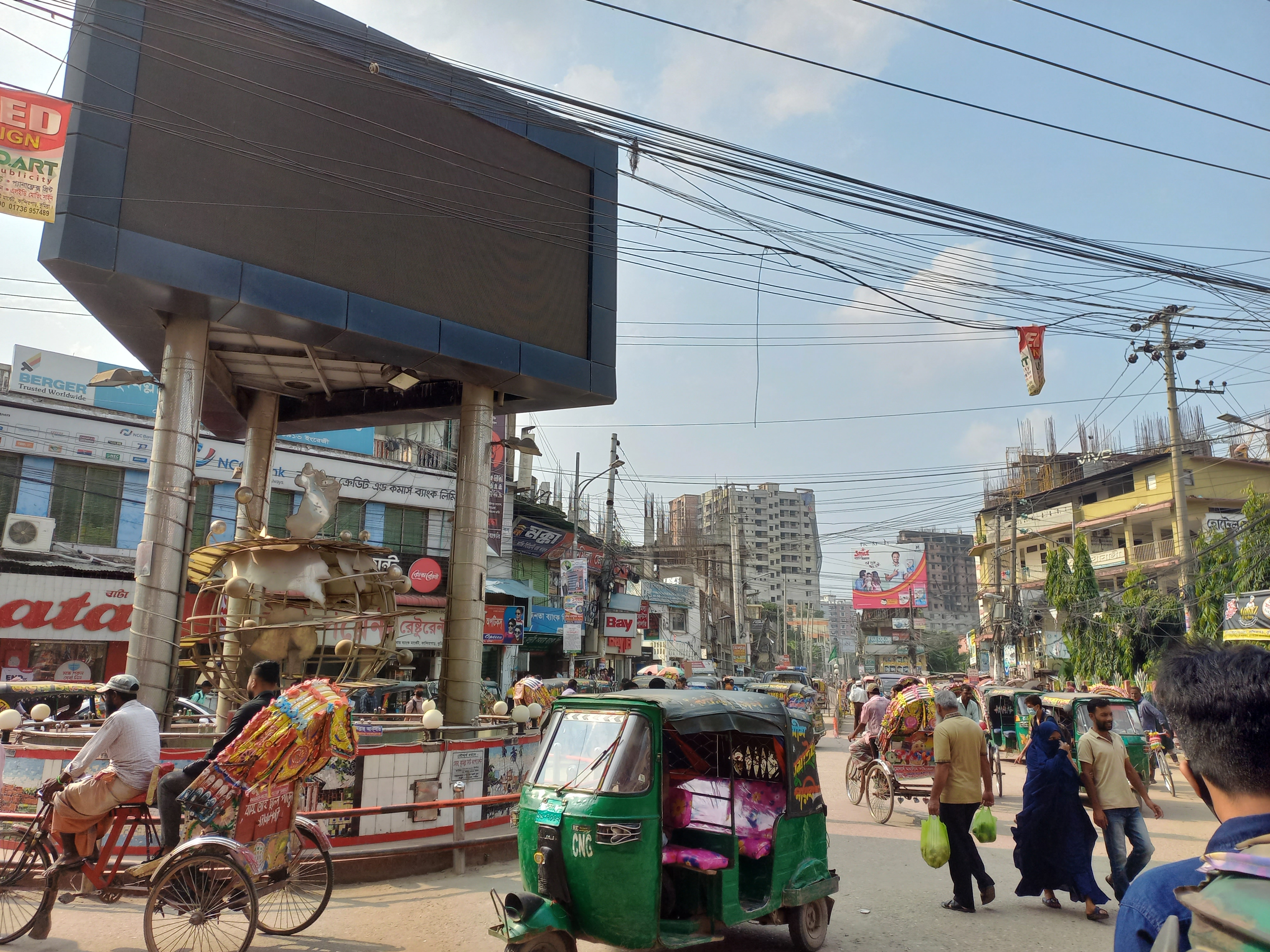
- Street in Comilla

- Coordinates: 23°28′N 91°11′E
- Country: Bangladesh
- Division: Chittagong
- District: Comilla

Area
  - Upazila: 142.72 km^{2} (55.10 sq mi)

Population (2022)
  - Upazila: 671,865
  - Density: 4,707.6/km^{2} (12,193/sq mi)
  - Urban: 283,429
- Time zone: UTC+6 (BST)
- Postal code: 3500
- Area code: 081
- Website: comillasadar.comilla.gov.bd

Comilla Adarsha Sadar Upazila mauza geocode map

Comilla Adarsha Sadar is an upazila of Comilla District in the Division of Chittagong, Bangladesh.

== Demographics ==
Religions in Cumilla Adarsha Sadar Upazila (2022)
Religion	Percent
Islam	96.86%
Hinduism	3.07%
Other or not stated	0.07%

According to the 2022 Bangladeshi census, Adarsha Sadar Upazila had 85,974 households and a population of 388,436. 9.86% of the population were under 5 years of age. Adarsha Sadar had a literacy rate (age 7 and over) of 81.07%: 81.91% for males and 80.27% for females, and a sex ratio of 97.44 males for every 100 females. 28,288 (7.28%) lived in urban areas.

According to the 2011 Census of Bangladesh, Cumilla Adarsha Sadar Upazila had 105,783 households and a population of 532,419. 118,968 (21.54%) were under 10 years of age. Cumilla Adarsha Sadar had a literacy rate (age 7 and over) of 65.75%, compared to the national average of 51.8%, and a sex ratio of 971 females per 1000 males. 296,010 (55.60%) lived in urban areas.

== Administration ==
Cumilla Adarsha Sadar Upazila is divided into Cumilla Municipality and eight union parishads: Amratoli, Uttar Durgapur, Dakshin Durgapur, Jagannathpur, Kalir Bazar, Panchthubi and Cumilla Cantonment. The union parishads are subdivided into 145 mauzas and 196 villages.

Cumilla Municipality is subdivided into 18 wards and 49 mahallas.

== See also ==
- Upazilas of Bangladesh
- Districts of Bangladesh
- Divisions of Bangladesh
