= Comilla-6 =

Constituency of Bangladesh's Jatiya Sangsad

Coordinates: 23.47°N 91.18°E

- Constituency for the Jatiya Sangsad
- District: Comilla District
- Division: Chittagong Division
- Electorate: 644,777 (2026)

Current constituency
- Created: 1973
- Party: Bangladesh Nationalist Party
- Member: Manirul Haque Chowdhury
- ← 253 Comilla-5 255 Comilla-7 →

Comilla-6 is a constituency represented in the Jatiya Sangsad (National Parliament) of Bangladesh since 2026 by Manirul Haque Chowdhury of the Bangladesh Nationalist Party.

== Boundaries ==
The constituency encompasses Comilla City Corporation, Comilla Adarsha Sadar Upazila, Comilla Sadar Dakshin Upazila and Comilla Cantonment.

== History ==
The constituency was created for the first general elections in newly independent Bangladesh, held in 1973.

Ahead of the 2008 general election, the Election Commission redrew constituency boundaries to reflect population changes revealed by the 2001 Bangladesh census. The 2008 redistricting altered the boundaries of the constituency.

Ahead of the 2014 general election, the Election Commission reduced the boundaries of the constituency. Previously it had also included one union parishad of Comilla Sadar Dakshin Upazila: Galiara.

Ahead of the 2018 general election, the Election Commission expanded the boundaries of the constituency by adding Comilla City Corporation and Comilla Cantonment.

== Members of Parliament ==
| Election | Member | Party |
|---|---|---|
| 1973 | Kazi Akbar Uddin Mohammad Siddique | Awami League |
| 1979 | Mozammel Haque | Bangladesh Nationalist Party |
Major Boundary Changes
| 1986 | Redwan Ahmed | Jatiya Party |
| 1988 | Khandaker Abdul Mannan | Bangladesh Freedom Party |
| 1991 | Redwan Ahmed | Independent |
| Feb 1996 | Khandaker Abdur Rashid | National Democratic Alliance |
| 1996 | Ali Ashraf | Awami League |
| 2001 | Redwan Ahmed | Bangladesh Nationalist Party |
| 2008 | Bahauddin Bahar | Awami League |
| 2014 | Bahauddin Bahar | Awami League |
| 2018 | Bahauddin Bahar | Awami League |
| 2024 | Bahauddin Bahar | Awami League |
| 2026 | Manirul Haque Chowdhury | Bangladesh Nationalist Party |

== Elections ==
=== Elections in the 2020s ===
General Election 2026: Comilla-6
| Party | Candidate | Votes | % | ±% |
|---|---|---|---|---|
| BNP | Monirul Hoque Chowdhury | 201,706 | 60.63 | +16.33 |
| Jamaat | Kazi Din Mohammad | 119,851 | 36.03 | +36.03 |
| Majority | | 81,855 | 24.60 | +14.30 |
| Turnout | | 332,698 | 51.60 | +20.50 |
| Registered electors | | 644,777 | | |
| BNP gain from AL | | | | |

=== Elections in the 2010s ===
General Election 2014: Comilla-6
| Party | Candidate | Votes | % | ±% |
|---|---|---|---|---|
| AL | A. K. M. Bahauddin Bahar | 59,025 | 60.1 | +5.5 |
| Independent | Masud Parvej Khan | 38,293 | 39.0 | N/A |
| NAP | Mohammad Ali | 888 | 0.9 | N/A |
| Majority | | 20,732 | 21.1 | +10.8 |
| Turnout | | 98,206 | 31.1 | −48.8 |
| AL hold | | | | |

=== Elections in the 2000s ===
General Election 2008: Comilla-6
| Party | Candidate | Votes | % | ±% |
|---|---|---|---|---|
| AL | A. K. M. Bahauddin Bahar | 126,136 | 54.6 | +23.8 |
| BNP | Mohammad Amin Ur Rashid Yeasin | 102,450 | 44.3 | −24.2 |
| BIF | Md. Oli Ahmmed | 1,219 | 0.5 | N/A |
| IAB | Masud Ahmad | 1,038 | 0.4 | N/A |
| Bangladesh Kalyan Party | Sahidur Rahman | 174 | 0.1 | N/A |
| Majority | | 23,686 | 10.3 | −27.4 |
| Turnout | | 231,017 | 79.9 | +10.9 |
| AL gain from BNP | | | | |

General Election 2001: Comilla-6
| Party | Candidate | Votes | % | ±% |
|---|---|---|---|---|
| BNP | Redwan Ahmed | 87,483 | 68.5 | +30.8 |
| AL | Ali Ashraf | 39,364 | 30.8 | −7.3 |
| IJOF | Md. Murad Mia Majumder | 342 | 0.3 | N/A |
| Independent | Md. Abdus Sattar | 228 | 0.2 | N/A |
| Independent | Abul Hasem Munsi | 184 | 0.1 | N/A |
| Jatiya Party (M) | Gazi Abul Kasem | 122 | 0.1 | N/A |
| Majority | | 48,119 | 37.7 | +37.3 |
| Turnout | | 127,723 | 69.0 | −4.1 |
| BNP gain from AL | | | | |

=== Elections in the 1990s ===
General Election June 1996: Comilla-6
| Party | Candidate | Votes | % | ±% |
|---|---|---|---|---|
| AL | Ali Ashraf | 37,090 | 38.1 | −1.9 |
| BNP | Redwan Ahmed | 36,724 | 37.7 | +35.1 |
| FP | Abdur Rashid Khandakar | 20,097 | 20.6 | +7.7 |
| Jamaat | Md. Ismail Mian | 2,157 | 2.2 | N/A |
| JP(E) | Md. Lutfar Reza Khokaon | 636 | 0.7 | −0.1 |
| NAP | Md. Mohsin Sarkar | 271 | 0.3 | N/A |
| JSD | Md. Mobarak Hossain | 226 | 0.2 | N/A |
| Independent | Md. Murad Miah Muzumdar | 220 | 0.2 | N/A |
| Majority | | 366 | 0.4 | −0.3 |
| Turnout | | 97,421 | 73.1 | +23.1 |
| AL gain from Independent | | | | |

General Election 1991: Comilla-6
| Party | Candidate | Votes | % | ±% |
|---|---|---|---|---|
| Independent | Redwan Ahmed | 31,179 | 40.7 | |
| AL | Ali Ashraf | 30,631 | 40.0 | |
| FP | Khandaker Abdul Mannan | 9,894 | 12.9 | |
| BNP | Z. A. Shamsul Haq | 1,955 | 2.6 | |
| Zaker Party | A. Mannan Zehadi | 1,205 | 1.6 | |
| JP(E) | Md. Mujibar Rahman Dilrazi | 636 | 0.8 | |
| NAP | Md. A. Zalil Bhuiyan | 549 | 0.7 | |
| BML | Mafizur Rahman Mazu | 492 | 0.6 | |
| Majority | | 548 | 0.7 | |
| Turnout | | 76,541 | 50.0 | |
| Independent gain from | | | | |
