= Mustafa Kamal (politician) =

Bangladeshi politician and cricket official

- মুস্তফা কামাল
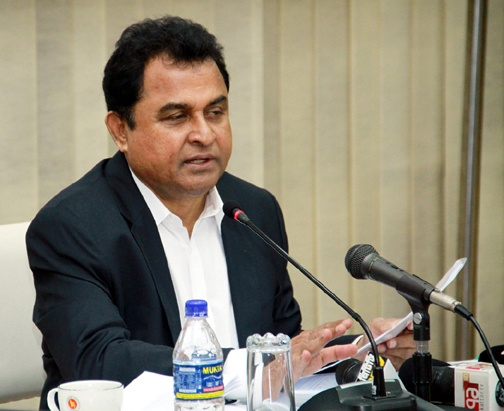
- Kamal in 2020

Member of the Bangladesh Parliament for Comilla-10
- In office 25 January 2009 – 6 August 2024
- Preceded by: Anwarul Azim

Minister of Finance
- In office 7 January 2019 – 10 January 2024
- Prime Minister: Sheikh Hasina
- Preceded by: Abul Mal Abdul Muhit
- Succeeded by: Abul Hassan Mahmood Ali

Minister for Planning
- In office 12 January 2014 – 7 January 2019
- Preceded by: A. K. Khandker
- Succeeded by: Muhammad Abdul Mannan

President of the International Cricket Council
- In office 1 July 2014 – 1 April 2015
- Preceded by: Alan Isaac
- Succeeded by: Zaheer Abbas

President of the Bangladesh Cricket Board
- In office 23 September 2009 – 17 October 2012
- Preceded by: Sina Ibn Jamali
- Succeeded by: Nazmul Hasan Papon

Personal details
- Born: Abu Hena Mohammed Mustafa; 15 June 1947 (age 79) Comilla, Bengal Presidency, British India
- Party: Bangladesh Awami League
- Education: University of Dhaka

Abu Hena Mohammad Mustafa Kamal (Bengali: আবু হেনা মোহাম্মদ মোস্তফা কামাল, romanized: Abu Hena Mohammad Mostofa Kamaal; born 15 June 1947) commonly known as Lotus Kamal is a Bangladeshi politician, former cricket official, and businessman. He was a member of the Jatiya Sangsad representing the Comilla-10 constituency and a Minister for Planning as well as Minister of Finance. He is the owner of Lotus Kamal Group, which is a well-known Bangladeshi conglomerate. Kamal was awarded the Finance Minister of the Year 2020 by magazine The Banker.

== Early life ==
Kamal was born on 15 June 1947 in Laksham, Cumilla, East Bengal, British India. After the primary education from local Dattapur Primary School, SSC from Bagmara High School in 1962, later HSC from Cumilla Victoria Government College, and B.Com. (Honors) degree from Chittagong Government Commerce College in 1964–1967. In 1967 he finished his undergraduate in Financial Management from the University of Dhaka. He completed his master's degree in accounting in 1968 from the University of Dhaka. He also earned a law degree. He is also an FCA (Fellow Chartered Accountant).

== Career ==
=== Business ===
Kamal founded the Lotus Kamal Group which is a well-known Bengali textile industry.

=== Politics ===
Kamal was elected to Parliament from Comilla-9 in 1996. He received 57,195 votes while his closest rival, Monirul Haq Chowdhury of Jatiya Party (E), received 47,570 votes.

Kamal contested the 2001 election from Comilla-9 as an Awami League candidate and lost. He received 66,175 votes while Monirul Haq Chowdhury of Bangladesh Nationalist Party candidate won with 78,622 votes.

Kamal was elected to his second term as a member of the Jatiya Sangsad for the constituency of Cumilla-10 in 2008. He received 138,089 votes while his nearest rival, Mobasher Alam Bhuiyan of the Bangladesh Nationalist Party, received 89,821.

Kamal was reelected in 2014 unopposed after the election was boycotted by the main opposition party, Bangladesh Nationalist Party. He is Convener of Awami League in the Cumilla district (South). He is also the Finance and Planning Secretary of Bangladesh Awami League. He was appointed the Minister for Planning in January 2014.

Kamal was re-elected to parliament in December 2018 from Comilla-10 as a candidate of the Awami League. He received 405,299 votes while his nearest rival, Md Monirul Haq Chowdhuri of the Bangladesh Nationalist Party, received 12,488 votes. On 7 January 2019, Kamal was appointed the Minister of Finance of Bangladesh.

=== Cricket administration ===
Kamal has been involved with cricket and its development for last 30 years in various capacities. From 1990 to 2010 he was chairman of the cricket committee of Abahani Limited, before becoming the President of Asian Cricket Council between 2010 and 2012.

In 2012, Kamal was named as the vice-president of the International Cricket Council (ICC) for the 2012–2014 term. Prior to his nomination for the ICC, Kamal was the president of the Bangladesh Cricket Board. Kamal succeeded Alan Isaac as president of the ICC in 2014.

Kamal resigned from his designation as ICC President, with effect from 1 April 2015. The resignation was reportedly to protest alleged non-compliance by the ICC of laws written in the constitution of the ICC, and he was an active protester of corruption in cricket.

== Personal life ==
Kamal's daughter Nafisa Kamal is the director of Farmers Bank presently known as Padma Bank Limited and owner of Cumilla Victorians and wife is Kasmiri Kamal.
