= Barura Upazila =

Barura বরুড়া
- Upazila
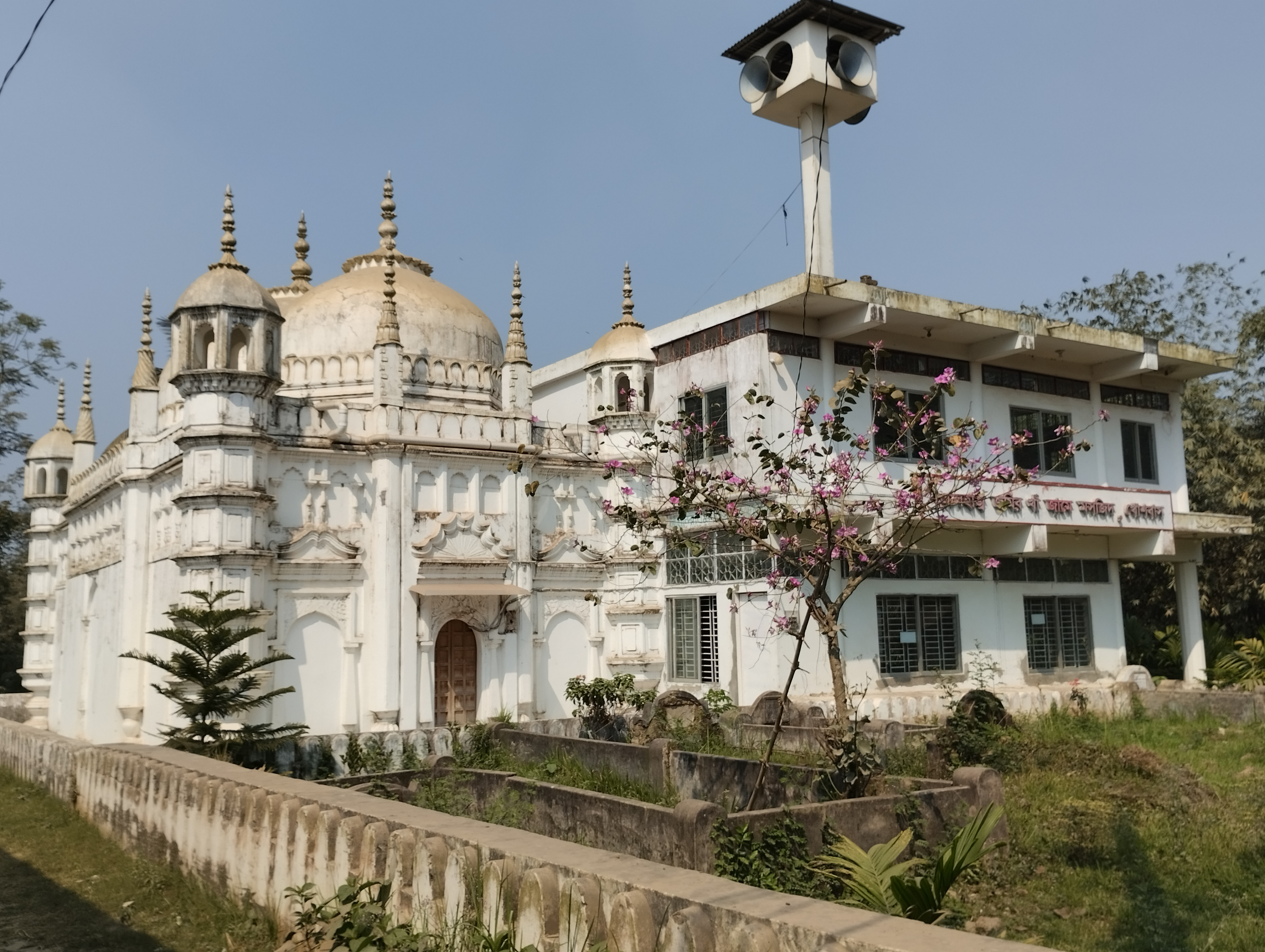
- Alhaj Zamir Khan Jame Mosque, North Khoshbas

- Coordinates: 23°22.5′N 91°3.5′E
- Country: Bangladesh
- Division: Chattogram
- District: Cumilla

Government
  - Former Member of parliament Bangladesh.: Late Mr. AKM Abu-Taher (1932 – 23 September 2004)
  - An advocate of female education, a philanthropist and social worker.: Begum Faizunnesa Choudhurani (1834–1903)

Area
  - Total: 242 km^{2} (93 sq mi)
  - Metro: 0 km^{2} (0 sq mi)
- Elevation: 21 m (69 ft)

Population (2022)
  - Total: 456,341
  - Density: 1,890/km^{2} (4,880/sq mi)
- Time zone: UTC+6 (BST)
- Postal code: 3560
- Area code: 08027
- Website: barura.comilla.gov.bd

Barura (Bengali: বরুড়া) is an upazila of Cumilla District in the Division of Chattogram, Bangladesh.

== History ==
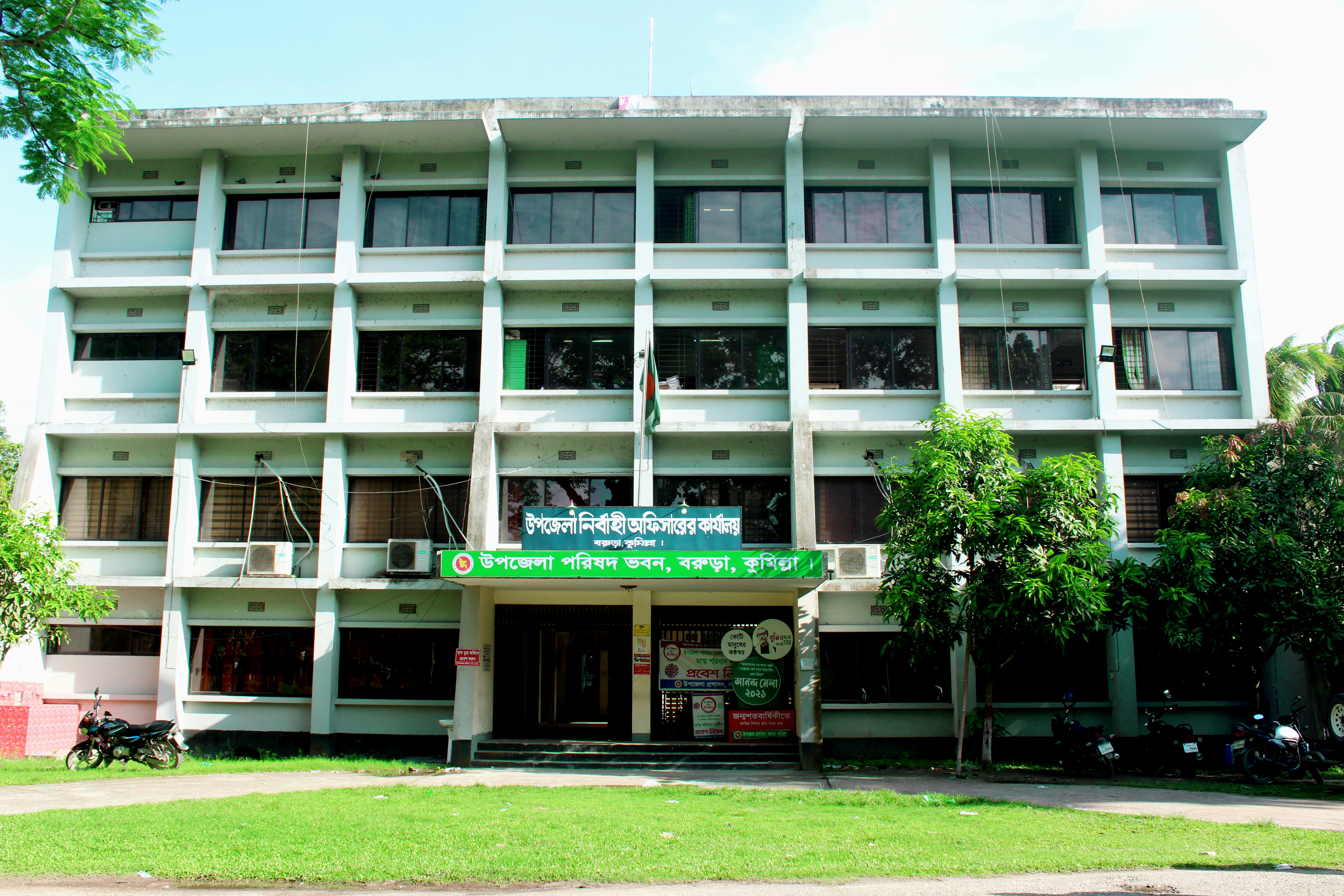
Upazila Council headquarters

Barura Thana was formed in 1948 and turned into an upazila in 1983. In 1995 Barura Upazila was turned into a municipality.

== Demographics ==
Religions in Barura Upazila (2022)
Religion	Percent
Islam	93.63%
Hinduism	6.26%
Other or not stated	0.01%

According to the 2022 Bangladeshi census, Barura Upazila had 106,558 households and a population of 456,341. 11.18% of the population were under 5 years of age. Barura had a literacy rate (age 7 and over) of 74.83%: 74.76% for males and 74.90% for females, and a sex ratio of 83.60 males for every 100 females. 79,134 (17.34%) lived in urban areas.

According to the 2011 Census of Bangladesh, Barura Upazila had 82,588 households and a population of 405,118. 101,032 (24.94%) were under 10 years of age. Barura has a literacy rate (age 7 and over) of 52.08%, compared to the national average of 51.8%, and a sex ratio of 1129 females per 1000 males. 49,126 (12.13%) lived in urban areas.

== Administration ==
Barura Upazila mauza geocode map

Barura Upazila is divided into Barura Municipality and 15 union councils: Aganagar, Bhabanipur, Uttar Khoshbas, Dakshin Khoshbas, Chitodda, Jhalam, Uttar Shilmuri, Dakshin Shilmuri, Adda, Adra, Shakpur, Galimpur, Vauksar, Laxmipur and Payalgacha. The union councils are subdivided into 212 mauzas and 314 villages.

Barura Municipality is subdivided into 9 wards and 26 mahallas.

Upazila Administration is run by the Office of the Upazila Nirbahi Officer. Upazila nirbahi officer (UNO) is the chief executive officer of the upazila and an upazila magistrate. As of 2021, the UNO is N-Uamong Marma Mong. AC (Land) is another officer of administration cadre who is accountable and responsible for land management.

=== Representative ===
Zakaria Taher Sumon was elected to parliament for Cumilla-8 as an Bangladesh Nationalist Party candidate in 2026.

Officials
Name	Role
Zakaria Taher Sumon	Member of Parliament
A N M Moinul Islam	Upazila Chairman
Md. Kamal Hossain	Upazila Vice Chairman
Kamrun Nahar Shikha	Upazila Female Vice Chairman
Md. Bakter Hossain	Mayor, Barura porusova

== Notable people ==
- Abdul Quddus

== Gallery ==
Upazila Parishad	Upazila Parishad Barura
Rest House	Barura Upazila Parishad Rest House
Bat toli Martyr Mural	Bat toli Martyr Mooral-Payalgacha, Barura

== See also ==
- Upazilas of Bangladesh
- Districts of Bangladesh
- Divisions of Bangladesh
