= Ausnara Union =

Ausnara Union আউশনারা ইউনিয়ন
- Location of Ausnara Union in Bangladesh
- Coordinates: 24.610216°N 90.079888°E
- Country: Bangladesh
- Division: Dhaka Division
- District: Tangail District
- Upazila: Madhupur Upazila
- Established on: 1984

Government
  - Type: Union Council

Area
  - Total: 117.71 km^{2} (45.45 sq mi)
- Elevation: 28 m (92 ft)

Population (2011)
  - Total: 56,794
  - Density: 482.49/km^{2} (1,249.6/sq mi)
- Time zone: UTC+6 (BST)
- Postal code: 1996
- Website: Official Website of Ausnara Union

Ausnara Union (Bengali: আউশনারা ইউনিয়ন) is a union of Madhupur Upazila, Tangail District, Bangladesh. It is situated 21 km southeast of Madhupur and 59 km northeast of Tangail in the middle of the Madhupur tract.

== Demographics ==
According to Population Census 2011 performed by Bangladesh Bureau of Statistics, The total population of Ausnara union is 56794. There are 14624 households in total.

== Administration ==
There are twenty-nine villages in the union, including Achra.

== Education ==
The literacy rate of Ausnara Union is 37.7% (Male-39.5%, Female-36%).

== See also ==
- Union Councils of Tangail District
