= Noakhali Government College =

Public college in Bangladesh

Coordinates: 22.8794°N 91.1056°E

- নোয়াখালি সরকারি কলেজ
- Motto: Education is Light
- Type: Government college
- Established: 1 March 1963
- Academic affiliations: Bangladesh National University, Board of Intermediate and Secondary Education, Comilla
- Students: About 10,000
- Location: Maijdee Court Sadar, Noakhali, Bangladesh
- Campus: 21 acres (8.5 ha)

Noakhali Government College is a public college in Noakhali, Bangladesh established in 1963. The college is affiliated with National University.

== History ==
Noakhali Government College was founded on 1 March 1963. It was nationalize in 1968. The campus is spread over 21 acres (8.5 ha). And the land was given by Chintaharan Chatterjee. The first principal of this college was A.K. Mohammad Ullah. Higher Secondary Certificate (HSC) started in this college in first July, 1963. Degree (Pass) started in this college in 1965. After creating National University, the college came under it. The honours level started in 1991 and the masters (finale) started in 1995.

== See also ==
- List of universities in Bangladesh
- List of Islamic educational institutions
- Bangladesh Technical Education Board
- List of colleges in Bangladesh
- Education in Bangladesh
- List of universities in Bangladesh
- Alokdia High School
- Madhupur Shahid Smrity Higher Secondary School
- Madhupur Rani Bhabani High School
- Madhupur College
