= New Govt. Degree College, Rajshahi =

Public college in Rajshahi, Bangladesh

New Govt. Degree College
- নিউ গভঃ ডিগ্রী কলেজ
- Seal of New Govt. Degree College.
- Other name: New Degree College
- Former name: Government Intermediate College
- EIIN: 127038
- College Code: National University - 2506; Board of Intermediate and Secondary Education, Rajshahi - 1025; Directorate of Secondary and Higher Education - 0138
- Type: Higher Secondary School; Degree college
- Established: July 1966; 60 years ago
- Founder: East Pakistan Government
- Accreditation: Rajshahi Education Board
- Affiliations: Bangladesh National University
- Principal: Professor Dr. Shikha Sarkar
- Vice Principal: Md. Motiur Rahman
- Academic staff: 69
- Students: 12000(Approx.)
- Location: Kazihata, Rajshahi, Bangladesh; 24.3691°N 88.5831°E
- Campus: 8.0799 acres (3.2698 ha); Urban
- Language: Bengali
- Demonym: NGDC
- Colors: Navy Blue and White
- Website: ngdc.ac.bd

New Govt. Degree College (Bengali: নিউ গভঃ ডিগ্রী কলেজ, রাজশাহী) is a government-sponsored independent college located in Rajshahi, Bangladesh.

== History ==
The formal journey of this college started in July 1966. However, the founding principal, Md. Shamsuddin Mia, was appointed in August 1965. Built by the government with the aim of increasing educational opportunities in the region, this college was named Rajshahi Government Intermediate College at the time of its establishment. At that time, a total of 16 lecturer posts were created for this newly built college, who were employed under the control of the principal of Rajshahi College. The first admission process to this college was completed by transferring some of the students admitted to Rajshahi College. In the first session, 200 students were admitted to Arts and Commerce stream for Intermediate classes. In 1967, 250 students were admitted to the Science stream after purchasing the necessary equipment for the laboratories of Physics, Chemistry, Botany, Zoology and Geography. At the same time, on the instructions of the DPI (Education Officer), Mathematics was also opened by appointing part-time teachers. At that time, a hostel (present-day Shamsuddin Hostel) was built for the accommodation of the students. Later, keeping in mind the needs of the students and guardians and the suitability of the physical infrastructure of the college, when the degree course was opened, the college came to be known as Rajshahi New Government Degree College.

The founding principal, with his sincerity, skill, prudence and above all courage, made unremitting efforts to establish the college on a solid foundation by facing all the adversities. Within three years of its establishment, the college had almost achieved parity with Rajshahi College in terms of education, especially sports and cultural activities. To preserve the memory of this wise principal, the first hostel of the college was named after him. The second principal of this college, Md. Haider Hossain, also made unremitting efforts to improve the quality of the college by following the policy of his predecessor. The second hostel of the college was named as 'Haider Hossain Hostel'. When admission to the higher secondary level was stopped in 1993 in order to expand postgraduate education programs at Rajshahi College, New Government Degree College became the main center for higher secondary education.

Currently, a total of 600 students are admitted in four sections in the Science stream, 300 in two sections in the Humanities stream, and 300 in two sections in the Business Education stream in class XI. Considering the students interested in pursuing higher education, honors courses were introduced in a total of 7 subjects including Bengali, English, Economics, Botany, Zoology, Accounting and Management since 1986. A total of 635 students are getting admission in the first year honors course in seven subjects since the academic year 2008–09. The matter of introducing honors courses in some other subjects is under process.

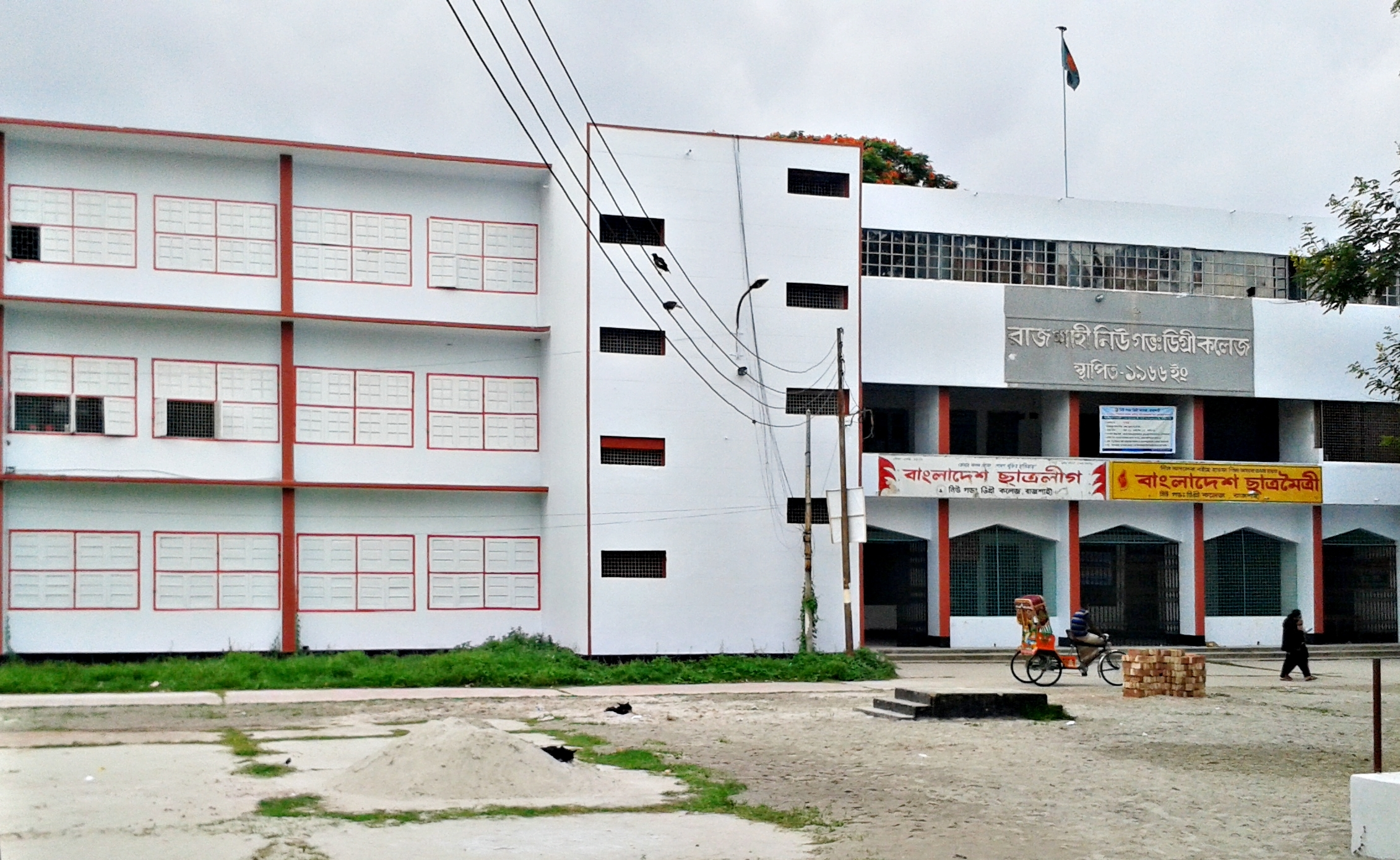
Main building of the college, in 2015

== Emblem ==
The emblem of New Govt. Degree College, Rajshahi has two circles on a golden background and an open book in the middle, with the Bengali alphabet printed on it. The outer circle is a symbol of universality and the inner circle indicates the position of New Govt. Degree College. The open book is a symbol of knowledge. The Bengali alphabet printed inside the book is a memorial of respect for the language and language martyrs. The golden color of the background symbolizes the golden future of the students.

== Academic Information ==
Currently, this college offers 17 subjects at the higher secondary level, 15 at the undergraduate level and 7 at the honors level, and 69 teachers are working and performing their duties in the created posts. In addition, there are a total of four hostels. This college is mainly known for its higher secondary level education.

== House ==
Currently, the college's higher secondary classes are grouped into 16 houses. A total of 32 guide teachers, two for each house, are employed. The houses have been named keeping in mind the country's history, tradition and natural beauty.

== Former principals ==
SL	Principal's name	Working period start	Working period end
1	M. Shamsuddin Miah	15 August 1965	5 September 1968
2	A.K.M Hayder Hosen	5 May 1970	3 July 1976
3	Md Lutfur Rahman	6 September 1976	25 September 1979
4	A.A Azizullah	11 October 1979	30 January 1980
5	Md. Abul Kashem	13 June 1980	10 February 1982
6	Md Golam Idris Khan	11 February 1982	30 October 1983
7	Md Belayet Ali	19 March 1984	31 August 1986
8	Gazi Abdus Salam	30 November 1986	20 July 1987
9	Md Moslem Ali	30 November 1987	31 March 1989
10	Md Abdul Mojid	1 April 1989	3 July 1993
11	Sofiur Rahman	3 August 1993	15 November 1993
12	Muhammad Aminur Rahman	15 November 1993	5 October 1996
13	Md Zobdul Haque	9 October 1996	8 November 2000
14	Md Nazrul Islam	3 December 2000	30 October 2001
15	Md Golam Murtoza Hossain	2 April 2002	29 June 2002
16	Razia Begum	26 August 2002	27 February 2003
17	A.B.M Bazlul Karim	6 March 2003	24 November 2004
18	Md Saiful Islam	19 January 2005	30 January 2005
19	K.N Shahjahan Karim	17 April 2005	2 May 2005
20	Ali Reza Muhammad Abdul Mazid	2 May 2005	17 July 2008
21	Farida Sultana	17 July 2008	26 July 2010
22	Md. Abdul Wahed Sarker	19 March 2011	19 August 2014
23	S.M Jarjis Kadir	1 April 2015	7 May 2020
24	Mst Abeda Sultana	6 February 2021	1 April 2021
25	Kalachand Shil	5 October 2021	Continuing
Source: "Former Principals". New Govt. Degree College.

== Extracurriculur activities ==
- Bangladesh National Cadet Corps
- Bangladesh Scouts
- Bangladesh Red Crescent Society
- Library, Indoor Games, Debating Clubs, Math Clubs, NLCC language club and so on.

== Subject information ==
The college offers courses in the following subject areas:

Arts Faculty:

- Bangla
- English
- Economics
- Arabic & Islamic Studies
- History
- Islamic History & Culture
- Philosophy
- Political Science

Business Faculty:

- Accounting
- Management
- Statistics

Science Faculty:

- Physics
- Chemistry
- Mathematics
- Botany
- Geography
- Zoology
- Information and Communication Technology

== Teacher ==
- Khoda Box Mridha

== Notable alumni ==
- Fazle Hossain Badsha - Politician and MP

== See also ==
- List of universities in Bangladesh
- Alokdia High School
- Madhupur Shahid Smrity Higher Secondary School
- Madhupur Rani Bhabani High School
- Madhupur College
