= Sholakuri Union =

Sholakuri Union শোলাকুড়ি ইউনিয়ন
- Location of Sholakuri Union in Bangladesh
- Coordinates: 24.715539°N 90.124728°E
- Country: Bangladesh
- Division: Dhaka Division
- District: Tangail District
- Upazila: Madhupur Upazila
- Established on: 1984

Government
  - Type: Union Council

Area
  - Total: 81.94 km^{2} (31.64 sq mi)
- Elevation: 28 m (92 ft)

Population (2011)
  - Total: 31,471
  - Density: 384.1/km^{2} (994.7/sq mi)
- Time zone: UTC+6 (BST)
- Postal code: 1996

Sholakuri Union (Bengali: শোলাকুড়ি ইউনিয়ন) is a union of Madhupur Upazila, Tangail District, Bangladesh. It is situated 25 km north of Madhupur and 64 km northeast of Tangail deep in the Madhupur tract.

== Demographics ==
According to Population Census 2011 performed by Bangladesh Bureau of Statistics, The total population of Sholakuri union is 31471. There are 7984 households in total.

== Education ==
The literacy rate of Sholakuri Union is 33.9% (Male-34.3%, Female-33.6%).

== See also ==
- Union Councils of Tangail District
