= Madhupur Rani Bhabani Government Model High School =

Coordinates: 24.616667°N 90.025°E

Madhupur Rani Bhabani Model Govt. High School
- মধুপুর রাণী ভবানী মডেল'সরকারি' উচ্চ বিদ্যালয়
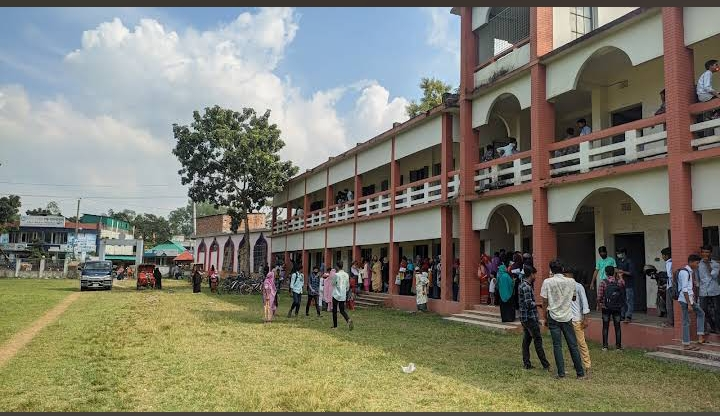
- Tangail; Dhaka; Bangladesh

Information
- Established: 02-01-39
- Founder: Rani Bhabani
- School code: 4800
- Headmaster: MD. ABDUL BASIT
- Staff: 29
- Teaching staff: 21
- Gender: Boys & Girls
- Age range: 7 to 15
- Enrollment: 1310
- Language: Bengali
- Campus size: 3.93 Acres
- Campus type: Government '
- Sports: Football, cricket, volleyball
- Team name: MRB Sports Class
- Affiliation: Board of Intermediate and Secondary Education, Dhaka Bangladesh Technical Education Board
- Board: Dhaka Education Board
- Website: https://mrbghs.school.gov.bd/

Madhupur Rani Bhabani Model-govt High School (Bengali : মধুপুর রানী ভবানী মডেল-সরকারি উচ্চ বিদ্যালয় ) also known as Madhupur Rani Bhabani Pilot High School is a high school located in Madhupur Upazila, Tangail, Dhaka, Bangladesh. The school offers education for students ranging from six to Secondary School Certificate (approximately ages 10 to 16). The school is under the direct control of the Ministry of Education

== Location ==
Madhupur Rani Bhabani Model Govt. High School is one Km from Madhupur bus stand, 45 km from Tangail, Mymensingh and Jamalpur district headquarters and 135 km from Dhaka city. The school is situated by the side of Tangail-Mymensingh highway.

== Academic performance ==
Madhupur Rani Bhabani Model Govt. High School's results from 2007 to 2024 for the Secondary School Certificate (SSC) level examinations are as follows:

Year	Number of Examinees	Number of Passed Students	Pass Percentage				
2007	93	89	95.70%				
2008	119	119	100.00%				
2009	146	142	97.26%				
2010	200	198	99%				
2011	192	190	98.96%				
2012	231	229	99.13%				
2013	244	243	99.59%				
2014	283	280	98.94%				
2015	294	281	95.58%				
2016	376	369	98.14%				
2017	408	360	88.24%				
2018	335	321	95.82%				
2019	336	322	95.83%				
2020	268	264	98.51%				
2021	363	343	94.49%				
2022	342	323	94.44%				
2023	325	298	91.69%				
2024	238	225	94.54%	2025	172	150	87.21%

Madhupur Rani Bhabani Model Govt. High School's results from 2011 to 2024 for the SSC (Vocational) examinations are as follows

Year	Number of Examinees	Number of Passed Students	Pass Percentage
2011	92	92	100.00%
2012	88	85	96.59%
2013	73	71	97.26%
2014	88	86	97.73%
2015	88	87	98.86%
2016	82	81	98.78%
2017	78	78	100.00%
2018	75	75	100.00%
2019	73	67	91.78%
2020	109	102	93.58%
2021	115	113	98.26%
2022	95	81	85.26%
2023	108	101	93.52%
2024	99	95	95.96%

== See also ==
- Madhupur Shahid Smrity Higher Secondary School
- Madhupur College
