= Arankhola Union =

Arankhola Union আরণখোলা ইউনিয়ন
- Location of Arankhola Union in Bangladesh
- Coordinates: 24.660990°N 90.088393°E
- Country: Bangladesh
- Division: Dhaka Division
- District: Tangail District
- Upazila: Madhupur Upazila
- Established on: 1984

Government
  - Type: Union Council

Area
  - Total: 117.71 km^{2} (45.45 sq mi)
- Elevation: 28 m (92 ft)

Population (2011)
  - Total: 59,895
  - Density: 508.84/km^{2} (1,317.9/sq mi)
- Time zone: UTC+6 (BST)
- Postal code: 1996
- Website: arankholaup.tangail.gov.bd

Arankhola Union (Bengali: আরণখোলা ইউনিয়ন) is a union of Madhupur Upazila, Tangail District, Bangladesh. It is situated 15 km northeast of Madhupur and 65 km northeast of Tangail in the middle of the Madhupur tract.

== Demographics ==
According to Population Census 2011 performed by Bangladesh Bureau of Statistics, The total population of Arankhola union is 59895. There are 15410 households in total.

== Education ==
The literacy rate of Arankhola Union is 39.3% (Male-40.1%, Female-38.4%).

== See also ==
- Union Councils of Tangail District
