= Jalchatra Bazaar, Bangladesh =

Jalchatra Bazaar জলছত্র বাজার
- Village
- Location in Bangladesh
- Coordinates: 24°37′N 90°1.5′E
- Country: Bangladesh
- Division: Dhaka Division
- District: Tangail District
- Upazila: Madhupur Upazila
- Union Council: Arankhola Union
- Elevation: 30 m (98 ft)
- Time zone: UTC+6 (BST)
- Postal code: 1996

Jalchatra Bazaar (Bengali: জলছত্র বাজার) is a market of Arankhola Union, Madhupur Upazila, Tangail District, Bangladesh. It is situated 56 km northeast of Tangail and 44 km southwest of Mymensingh deep in the Madhupur Jungle.

Jalchatra Bazaar is widely popular for its banana and pineapple market. Madhupur tract is very fertile for banana and pineapple production. About 80 percent of pineapples of Bangladesh are produced in Madhupur Upazila. These pineapples and bananas are all resembled in Jalchatra by the distributors to sell the fruits to the buyers from all over Bangladesh.

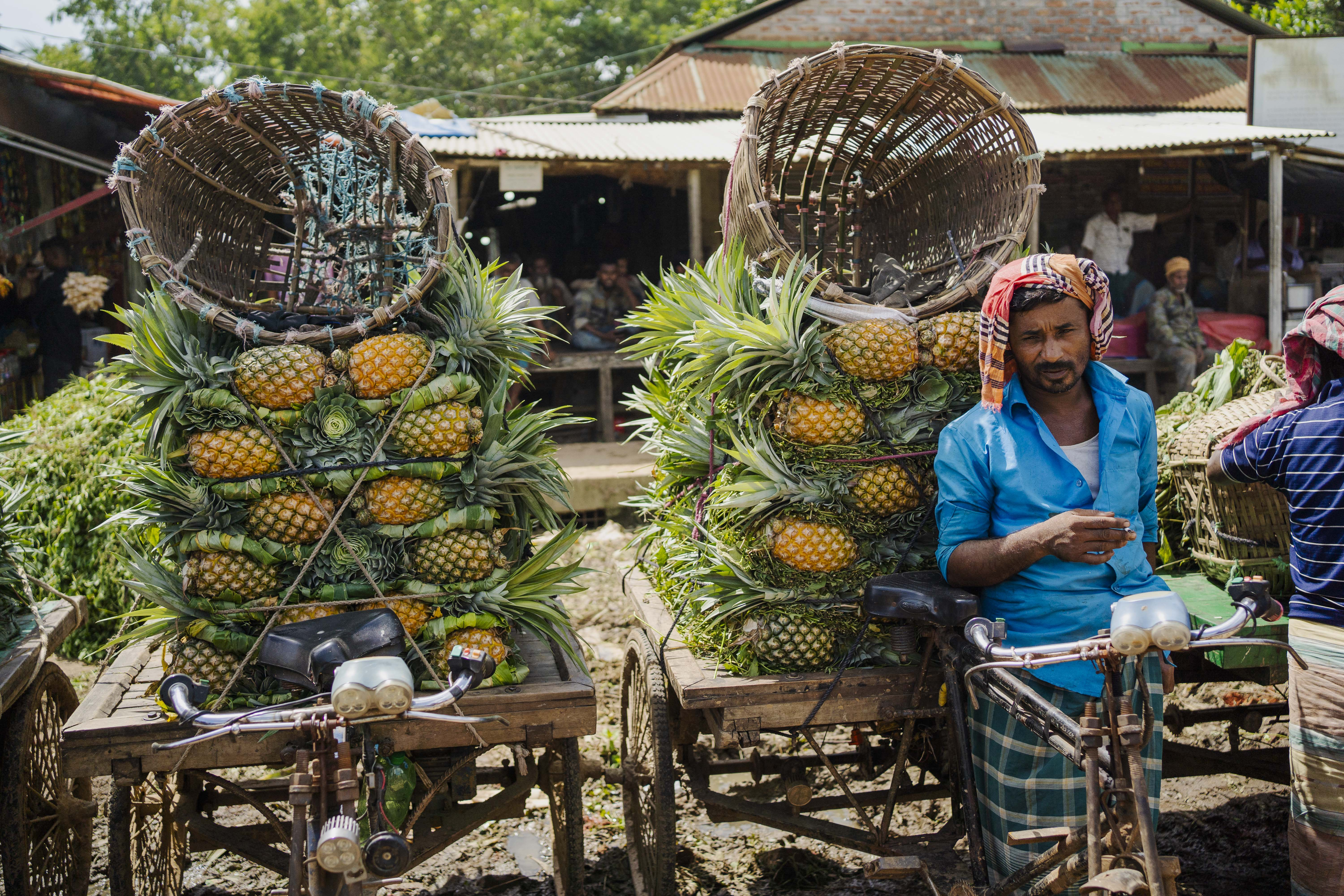
A pineapple vendor at Jalchatra Bazar in Modhupur, Tangail, surrounded by his vibrant, fresh produce.

== Photo gallery ==
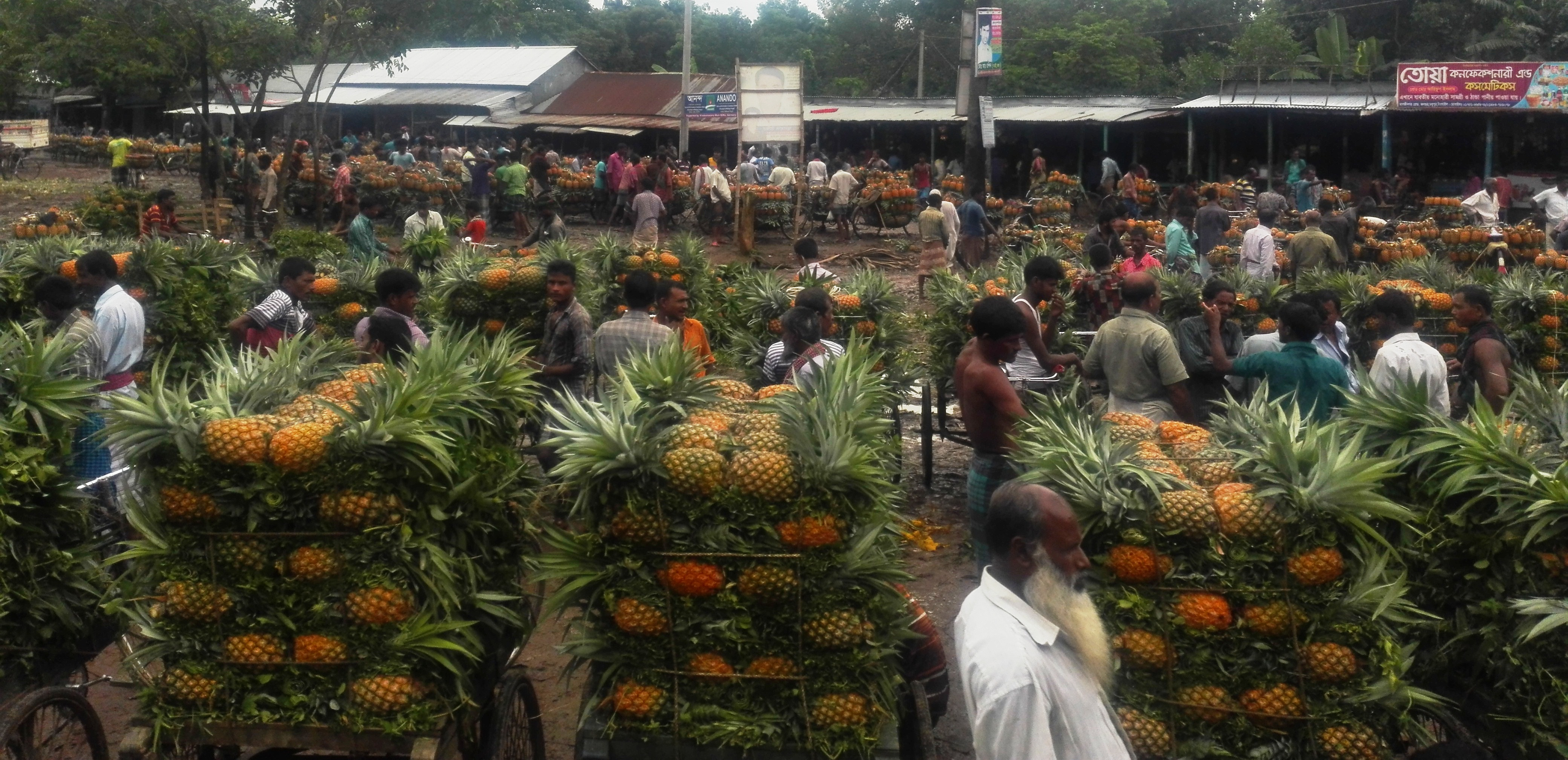
Pineapple market, Jolsotro

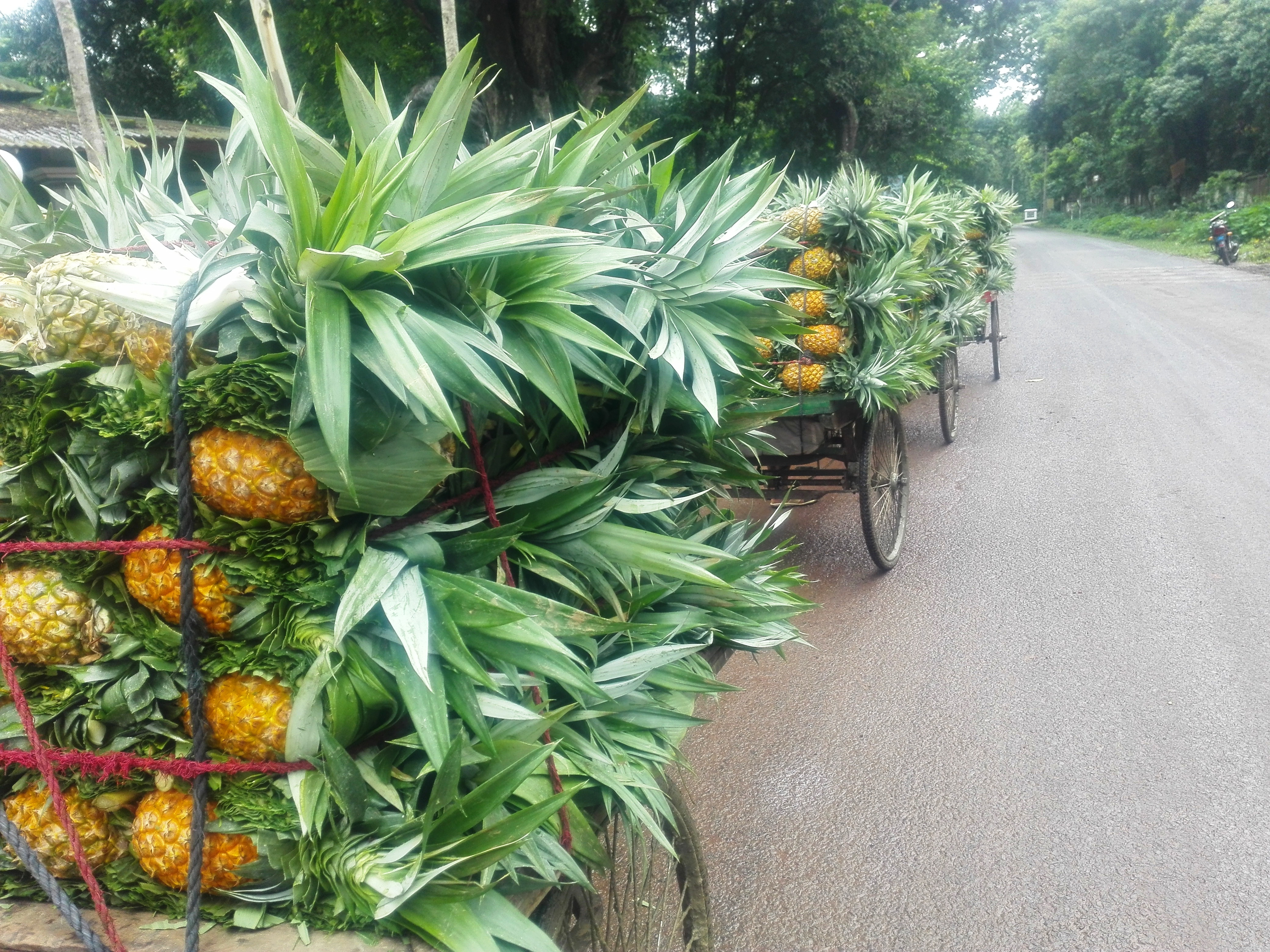
pineapples carrying to Jolchatro market

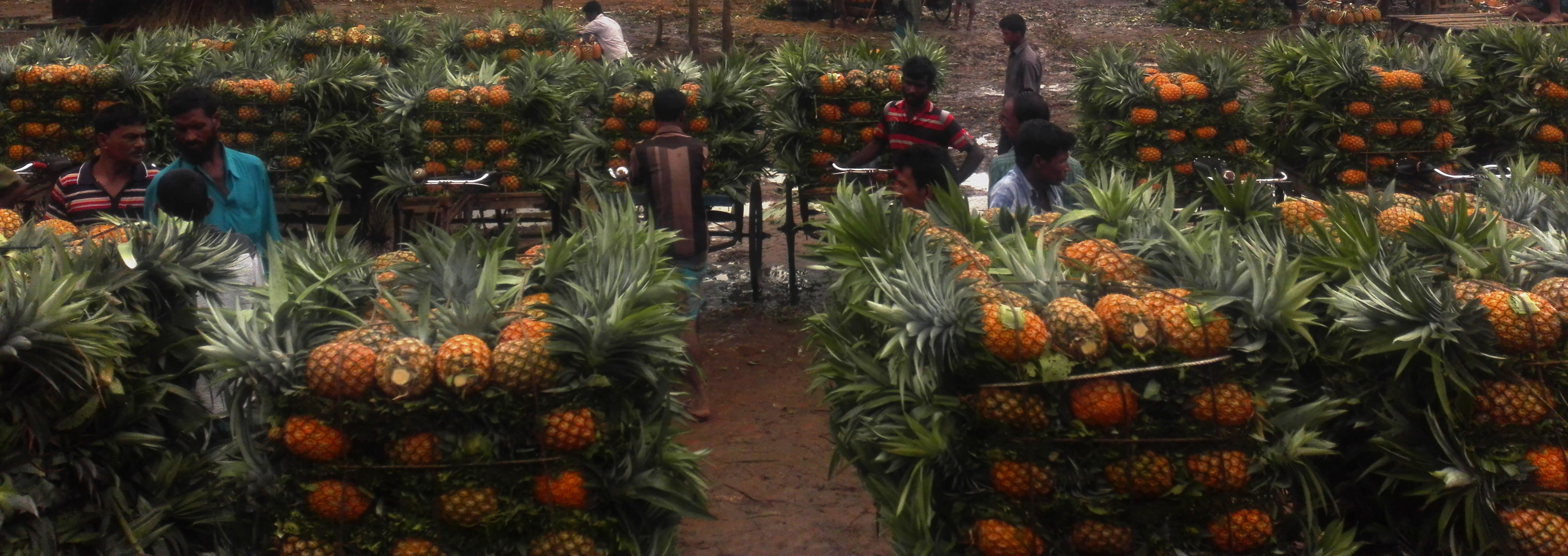
Peoples busy at pineapple market
