= Mirzabari Union =

Mirzabari Union মির্জাবাড়ী ইউনিয়ন
- Location of Mirzabari Union in Bangladesh
- Coordinates: 24.662049°N 90.004557°E
- Country: Bangladesh
- Division: Dhaka Division
- District: Tangail District
- Upazila: Madhupur Upazila
- Established: 1984

Government
  - Type: Union Council
  - Chairman: Sadiqur Rahman (Bangladesh Awami League)
  - Member: Sujon Miah (Bangladesh Nationalist Party)

Area
  - Total: 18.84 km^{2} (7.27 sq mi)
- Elevation: 18 m (59 ft)

Population (2011)
  - Total: 24,278
  - Density: 1,289/km^{2} (3,338/sq mi)
- Time zone: UTC+6 (BST)
- Postal code: 1996
- Website: mirzabariup.tangail.gov.bd

Mirzabari Union (Bengali: মির্জাবাড়ী ইউনিয়ন) is a union of Madhupur Upazila, Tangail District, Bangladesh. It is situated 5 kilometres (3.1 mi) south of Madhupur and 51 kilometres (32 mi) northeast of Tangail.

== Demographics ==
According to the 2011 Bangladesh census, Mirzabari Union had 6,346 households and a population of 24,278. The literacy rate (age 7 and over) was 35.5% (male: 36.2%, female: 34.9%).

== See also ==
- Union Councils of Tangail District
