= Golabari Union =

Golabari Union is an administrative subdivision in Bangladesh. It may refer to:

- Golabari Union, Khagrachhari, a union in Khagrachhari District
- Golabari Union, Madhupur, a union in Tangail District
