= Golabari Union, Madhupur =

Golabari Union গোলাবাড়ী ইউনিয়ন
- Location of Golabari Union in Bangladesh
- Coordinates: 24.625968°N 89.982135°E
- Country: Bangladesh
- Division: Dhaka Division
- District: Tangail District
- Upazila: Madhupur Upazila
- Established on: 1984

Government
  - Type: Union Council
  - Chairman: Mostafa Khan Bablu (Bangladesh Awami League)

Area
  - Total: 26.52 km^{2} (10.24 sq mi)
- Elevation: 18 m (59 ft)
- Time zone: UTC+6 (BST)
- Postal code: 1996

Golabari Union (Bengali: গোলাবাড়ী ইউনিয়ন) is a union of Madhupur Upazila, Tangail District, Bangladesh. It is situated 7 kilometres (4.3 mi) northwest of Madhupur and 52 kilometres (32 mi) north of Tangail.

== Demographics ==
According to the 2011 Bangladesh census, Golabari Union had 8,857 households and a population of 33,361.

The literacy rate (age 7 and over) was 38.7% (Male-40.4%, Female-37%).

== See also ==
- Union Councils of Tangail District
