= Raihan Akhter Banu Roni =

Bangladeshi politician

Raihan Akhtar Banu Roni
- রায়হান আখতার বানু রনি

Member of the Bangladesh Parliament for Women's Seat-20
- In office 10 October 2001 – 28 October 2006

Personal details
- Born: 11 January 1952 Naogaon, Rajshahi Division, East Bengal, Dominion of Pakistan
- Died: 3 April 2024 (aged 72) Dhaka, Bangladesh
- Party: Bangladesh Nationalist Party (BNP) (1990–2024)
- Other political affiliations: Bangladesh Chhatra League (before 1972)
- Spouse(s): Mohiuddin Ahmed (m.1970– 2000 his death)
- Relatives: Pola Uddin, Baroness Uddin (cousin); Khoda Box Mridha (uncle)
- Education: University of Rajshahi (BS)
- Occupation: Politician and social worker

Raihan Akhter Banu (nickname: Roni; Bengali: রায়হান আখতার বানু, 11 January 1952 - 3 April 2024) was a member of parliament of Bangladesh and a leader of the Bangladesh Nationalist Party (BNP). She started her political career as a student leader of the then East Pakistan Student League that is currently known as Bangladesh Chhatra League. As an organiser, she actively took part in the Bangladesh Liberation War in 1971. She was elected as a member of parliament (Member of the Jatiyo Sangshad) of Bangladesh in the 8th Parliament on the nomination of Bangladesh Nationalist Party (BNP). She falls in the list of both 20th-century women politicians and 21st-century women politicians, as she started her politics in 1969 and became an MP in 2004.

== Early life and education ==
Raihan Akhter Banu was born to Rowshan Ara and Abdur Rahman Mondal at 'Chalkdev Para' area of Naogaon Town in Naogaon District. She completed her Secondary School Certificate (SSC) examination from the Central Girls' High School of Naogaon under Rajshahi Board. She appeared in Higher Secondary Certificate (HSC) examination from the Naogaon Govt. BMC Women's College. Raihan Akhter Banu Roni received her Bachelor of Arts degree from the Rajshahi University. Her father was a prominent person of the town. Her paternal Uncle Late Khan Mohammad Basir Uddin Mondal was a politician of the then All-India Muslim League and the then Pakistan Muslim League. Her paternal grandfather Late Zarif Modal was a landlord and rich person of the district. Her elder brother Late Mokhlesur Rahman Raja was a veteran freedom fighter of Bangladesh Liberation War and a former leader of Awami League(before 1974) and Jatiyo Samajtrantic Dal (JSD)(after 1974 to 1984).

Late Kasir Uddin Mridha of Rajshahi, a veteran leader of the then All-India Muslim League of Rajshahi in British India, was her maternal grandfather. Her maternal uncle Late Khoda Box Mridha was a famous sports personality of the country. Pola Uddin, Baroness Uddin, a British life peer and community activist of Bangladeshi descent, is a cousin of Raihan Akhter Banu.

== Early political career ==
Raihan Akhter Banu (Roni) started her political career at the age of 16 while she was a student of class 11 (Intermediate or HSC level). She followed her elder brother's footsteps in politics and became a member of the then East Pakistan Students' League, currently known as Bangladesh Chhatra League(বাংলাদেশ ছাত্র লীগ), a sister organisation of Awami League party. She was elected as Secretary of her Naogaon Govt. BMC Women's College Students' Union at the age of 17 years in 1969.

== Marriage and Liberation War of Bangladesh ==
Raihan Akhter married a veteran Language Fighter of 1952 and well known leftist leader of Bangladesh Mohiuddin Ahmed. As a freedom fighter of battle field, her elder brother joined the Bangladesh Liberation War and her husband took part as an organiser. She also took part in the Bangladesh Liberation War of 1971, as an organiser. To organise, in June 1971 she went to Murshidabad of West Bengal and later on to Kolkata.

== Motherhood and sabbatical from politics ==
After Bangladesh achieved her independence, Mrs. Raihan Akhter Banu took a long sabbatical from politics. She completed her Bachelor of Arts from the university of Rajshahi in 1972. She became mother of two sons and a daughter. She spent almost 20 years of her life rearing her children. She again started her political career in late 1990.

== Politics after 1990 ==
Raihan Akhter Banu was involved in an anti-autocratic regime movement of 1990 and later she participated in political programmes.

== Member of Parliament and afterwards ==
In recent years, Raihan Akhter has been active in both national politics and Naogaon District BNP politics.

== Death ==
Raihan Akhtar Banu died from multiple organ dysfunction syndrome on 3 April 2024, at the age of 72.
