= Achra, Bangladesh =

Coordinates: 24°35′N 90°07′E

Achra is located at Madhupur Upazila in Tangail of Bangladesh. Achra borders the Mymensingh division, as well as Chapri and Chunia.

- Achra Bangladesh @ Google Maps

== See also ==
- Achra, India
