= Tangail Government Mohila College =

College in Tangail District, Bangladesh

- টাঙ্গাইল সরকারি মহিলা মহাবিদ্যালয়
- Former names: Govt. Sheikh Fazilatunnesa Mujib Mohila College, Tangail
- Type: Public
- Established: 1999
- Principal: Professor Tahmina Jahan
- Faculty: 52
- Administrative staff: 20
- Students: 5000
- Location: Tangail, Bangladesh; 24.25325447°N 89.91425246°E
- Campus: Urban
- Website: http://www.gsfmmc.edu.bd/

Tangail Government Mohila College (Bengali: টাঙ্গাইল সরকারি মহিলা মহাবিদ্যালয়), also called Govt. Sheikh Fazilatunnesa Mujib Women's College, located in Zila Sadar Road, Tangail, is a government financed women's college affiliated with Bangladesh National University. The college emerged as an ideal institution while Tangail was lacking on quality educational institutions in 2000s.

== Programmes ==
This college offers higher secondary and degree programmes as well as post-secondary Honours programmes.

=== Science Group subjects for Honours Programme ===
- Physics
- Chemistry
- Biology
- Mathematics
- Geography

=== Arts Group subjects for Honours Programme ===
- History
- Civics
- Economics
- Social Science
- Geography
- Islamic Studies
