= Edric Baker =

New Zealander–Bangladeshi doctor (1941–2015)

- Born: 12 August 1941; New Zealand
- Died: September 1, 2015 (aged 74); Kailakuri Health Care Centre; Madhupur, Bangladesh
- Burial place: Kailakuri Health Care Centre
- Other names: "Doctor Brother" (ডাক্তার ভাই, Daktar Bhai)
- Citizenship: New Zealand (1941); Bangladesh (2014)
- Education: MBBS, Dunedin Med. (1965)
- Occupation: Physician

Edric Baker (also Bengali: ডাক্তার ভাই, romanized: Daktar Bhai, lit. 'Doctor Brother'; 1941 – 1 September 2015) was a New Zealand physician in Bangladesh.

== Personal life ==
In 1941, Baker was born in New Zealand to a wealthy, noble family of Catholics. He was a lifelong bachelor.

In 2011, Hanif Sanket of Bangladesh Television produced a documentary about Baker and his medical work in Madhupur Upazila. This led the Bangladeshi government to change legislation so the doctor could be granted Bangladeshi citizenship (in addition to his New Zealander citizenship) in recognition of Baker's "selfless service to the people of Bangladesh". He was subsequently interviewed by Ityadi.

Ill since 2011, Baker was diagnosed with incurable idiopathic pulmonary hypertension in 2014. He died at his Kailakuri Health Care Centre at 74 years old on 1 September 2015 at around 2:15pm. He was survived by his mother, two sisters, and four brothers—all in New Zealand. The doctor was buried on 8 September 2015 behind his house at Kailakuri.

== Career ==
Baker received his Bachelor of Medicine, Bachelor of Surgery from University of Otago Dunedin School of Medicine in 1965. He then served with a government medical team in Qui Nhon and Kon Tum, tending to civilian casualties of the Vietnam War. Baker's work in the war ended with four months in a North Vietnamese prison before that nation deported him. In 1975, he went to Australia and England to study pediatrics.

Driven by his Christianity, Baker moved to Bangladesh in 1979 because of its "really good" people and their inability to receive healthcare due to poverty. After working in a Christian mission hospital in Meherpur District, and then at Kumudini Hospital in Mirzapur Upazila, Baker established the Kailakuri Health Care Centre in Madhupur Upazila in 1983. The doctor was renowned for charging only 5–10 Bangladeshi taka (equivalent to approximately 0.09–0.17 United States dollars in 2025) for physical examinations, and providing his patients with needed medicine whether they could pay or not. The clinic received donations from New Zealand, the United Kingdom, and the United States. For his devotion to the local Bangladeshis, they called Baker "Doctor Brother" (Bengali: ডাক্তার ভাই, romanized: Daktar Bhai). By 2011, Baker was ill and awaiting a physician to replace him; when he died in 2015, none had arrived.
