= Madhupur Shahid Smrity Higher Secondary School =

Madhupur Shahid Smrity Higher Secondary School, Tangail
- মধুপুর শহীদ স্মৃতি উচ্চ মাধ্যমিক বিদ্যালয়,টাঙ্গাইল
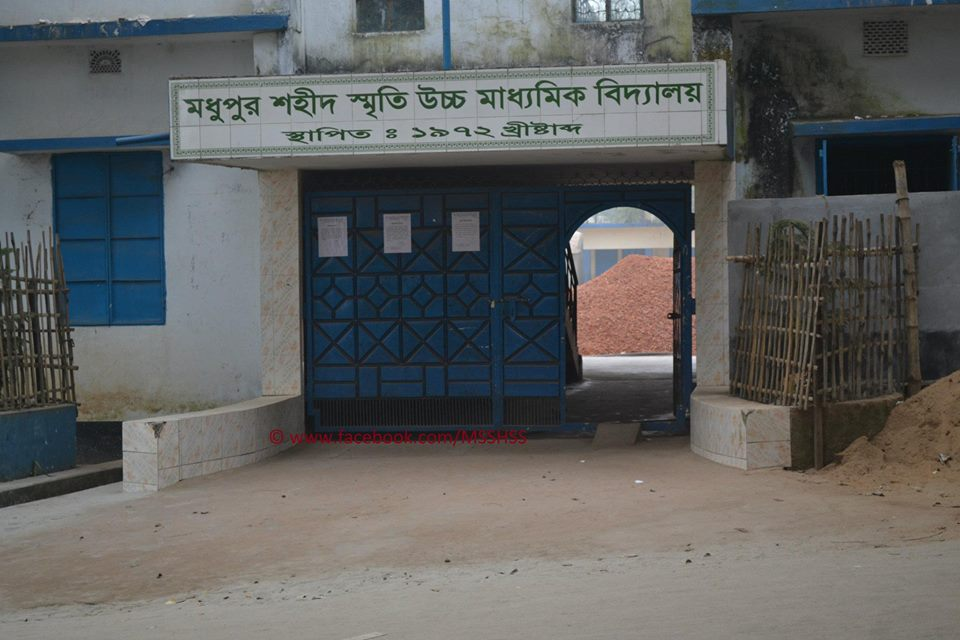

Location
- Madhupur Upazila; Madhupur, Tangail, 1996; Bangladesh; 24.6167°N 90.0250°E

Information
- Established: 1972
- Founder: MD. Al-Haj Nur Rahman
- School board: Dhaka Education Board
- School code: 4207051302 & 4502
- Principal: Acting principle: Md.Nijam Uddin Torofder
- Teaching staff: 28+20
- Gender: Boys & Girls
- Enrollment: 3200
- Language: Bengali
- Classrooms: 53
- Campus size: 15000+ sqm Acre
- Campus type: Urban
- Sports: Football, cricket, volleyball

Madhupur Shahid Smrity Higher Secondary School (Bengali: মধুপুর শহীদ স্মৃতি উচ্চ মাধ্যমিক বিদ্যালয়), also known as Madhupur Shahid Smrity School & College, is a non-government educational institution in Madhupur Upazila, Tangail, Dhaka, Bangladesh, established in 1972. The school offers education for students ranging from six to Higher Secondary School Certificate with over 2500 students. Although it was set up for students of surrounding areas, students now come from most parts of Bangladesh. The school is under the direct control of the Ministry of Education.

== History ==
Al-Haj Nur Rahman, a native-born son of Tangail, founded the school in 1972. The school opened its college section in 1995–96; and first participated in the HSC examination in 1997. Madhupur Shahid Smrity Higher Secondary School is especially devoted to education in areas that contribute to or prosper in science and technology. Madhupur Shahid Smrity Higher Secondary School has 2500+ students, and 52 teachers.

== Location ==
The school is in Madhupur Upazila, 45 km from Tangail, Mymensingh and Jamalpur district headquarters and 135 km from Dhaka city. The school is on the Bangshi River.

== Publications ==
The school magazine is named Jagaran (Bengali: জাগরণ), which means Awakening. The Bengali-language magazine is published annually with stories, articles, poems and writings from students, teachers and associate people. It also carries the results of the students in public examinations.

== Awards ==
The school was 9th among the top ten colleges (2003), and won the Presidential award for the best college of the year 2004.

== Gallery ==
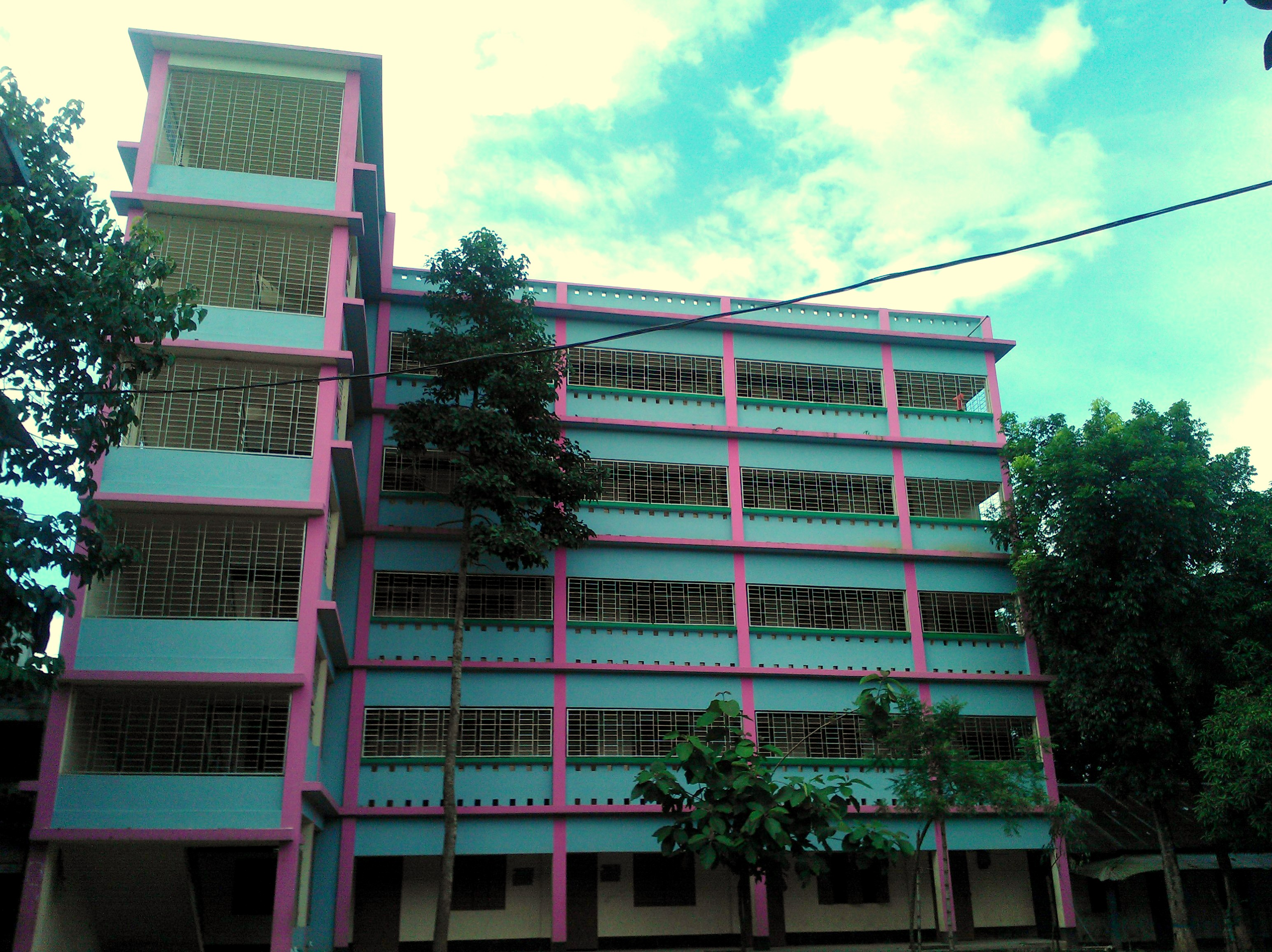
A new building of Modhupur Shahid Smrity High School

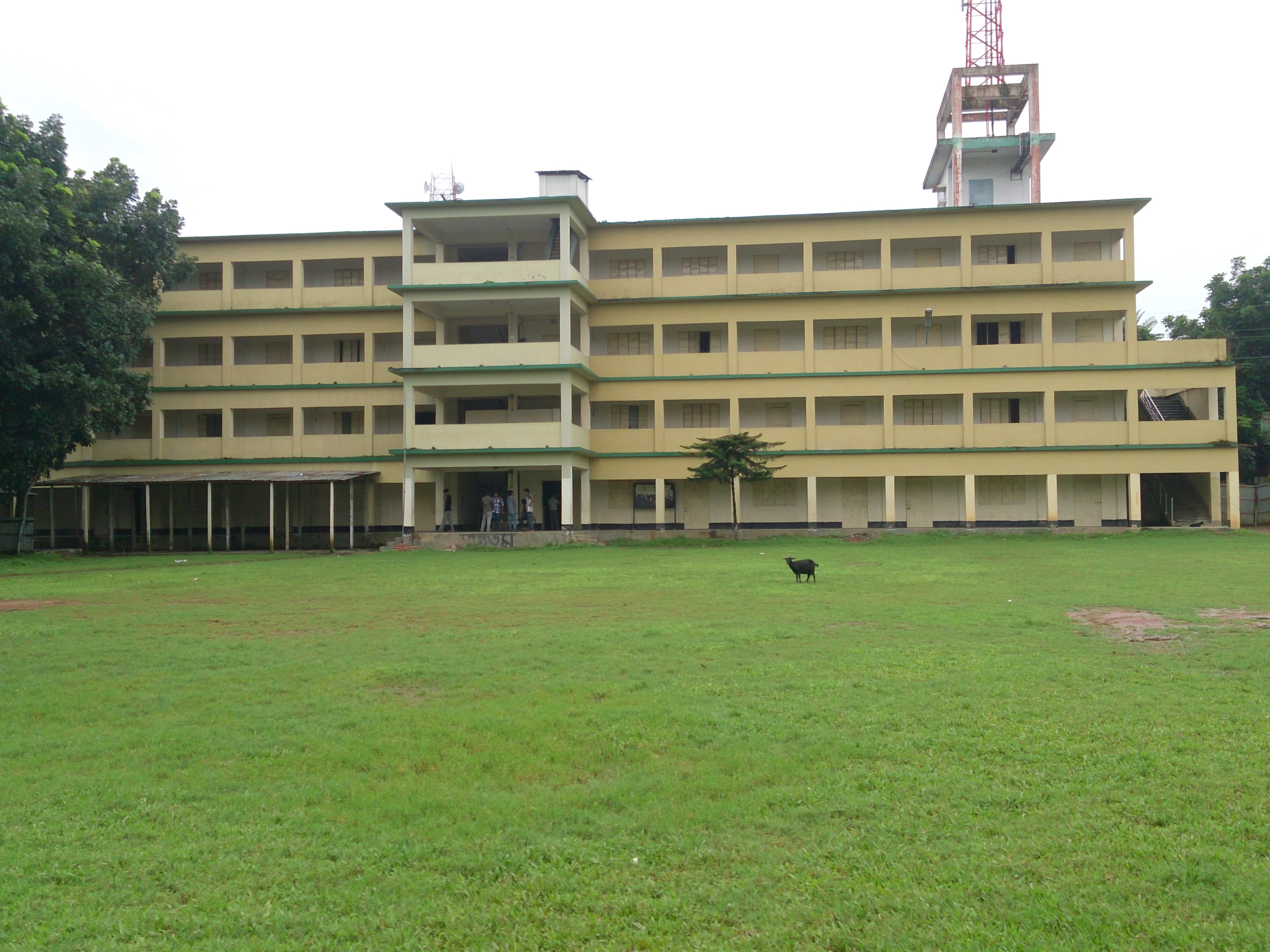
College building of Modhupur Shahid Smrity

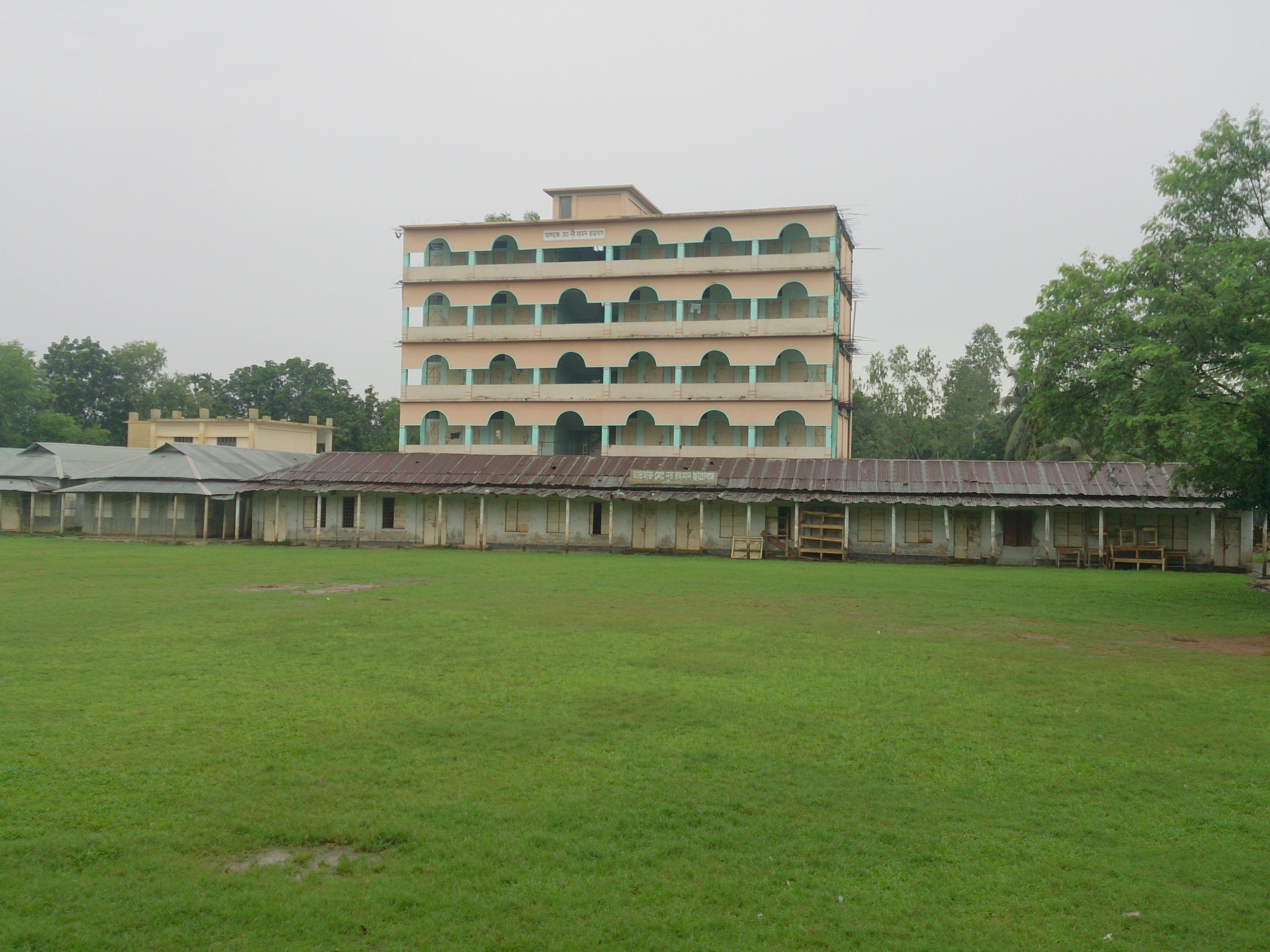
College Hostel of Modhupur Shahid Smrity

== See also ==
- Alokdia High School
- Madhupur Rani Bhabani bal High School
- Madhupur College
