= Madhupur College =

Coordinates: 24.616667°N 90.025°E

- মধুপুর কলেজ
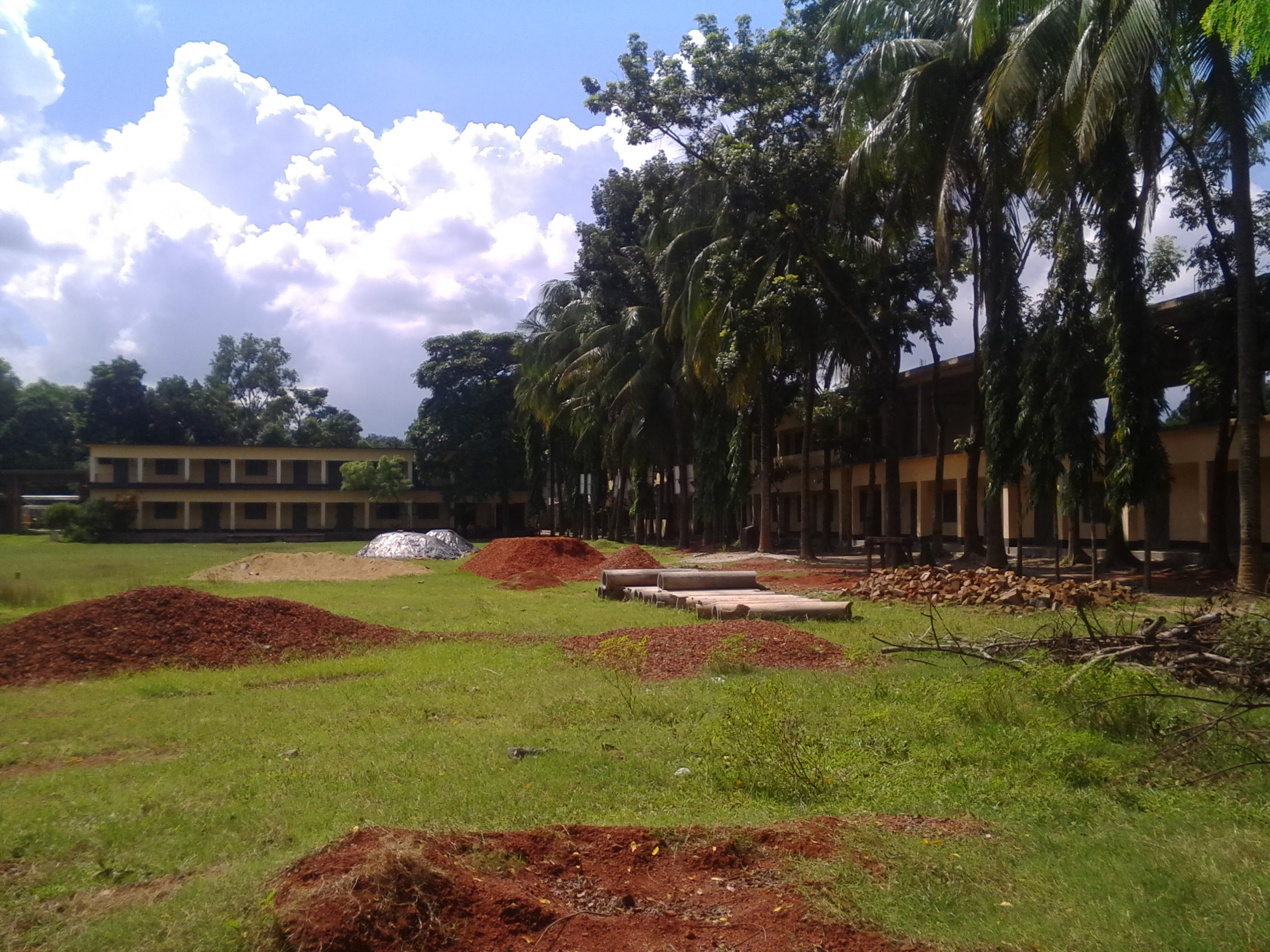
- Type: University college
- Established: 1972
- Founders: Mohendra lal Bormon
- Academic affiliations: Bangladesh National University, Board of Intermediate and Secondary Education, Dhaka
- Principal: Montaz Ali
- Students: 1820
- Location: Madhupur Upazila, Tangail, Bangladesh
- Campus: Urban, 5.45 acres (2.21 ha)

Madhupur College (Bengali: মধুপুর কলেজ) is a university college located in Madhupur Upazila, Tangail, Dhaka, Bangladesh established in 1972. It offers Higher Secondary Level (HSC), degree level and provides some honours level courses. The college is affiliated with the National University and Board of Intermediate and Secondary Education, Dhaka.

== Location ==
Madhupur College is one km (0.62 mi) from the Madhupur bus stand, 45 km (28 mi) from Tangail, Mymensingh and Jamalpur district headquarters and 135 km (84 mi) from Dhaka city. The college is situated by the side of Tangail-Mymensingh highway.

== See also ==
- Alokdia High School
- Madhupur Shahid Smrity Higher Secondary School
- Madhupur Rani Bhabani High School
