= Khoda Box Mridha =

- খোদা বক্স মৃধা
- Born: 22 January 1945; Hethemkhan, Rajshahi District, Bengal Presidency, British India
- Died: 30 March 2010 (aged 65); Hethemkhan, Rajshahi, Bangladesh
- Education: MA (political science)
- Alma mater: University of Rajshahi
- Occupations: sports commentator, college professor

Khoda Box Mridha (22 January 1945 – 30 March 2010) was a Bangladeshi sports commentator, player, and sports organizer.

== Early life and education ==
Mridha passed his matriculation examination from Rajshahi Muslim Higher Secondary School in 1961 and the intermediate examination in 1963 from Rajshahi College. He completed his bachelor's and master's from University of Rajshahi in political science.

== Career ==
Mridha started his career in 1968 as a lecturer in the Department of Political Science at Murari Chand College. He then worked as a teacher in Rajshahi New Government Degree College, Rajshahi Government Women College, Rajshahi Government City College, and Rajshahi Government College. He retired from the teaching profession in 2003.

Mridha served as an executive member of Bangladesh Cricket Board.

In 1972, he made his debut as a commentator at a friendly match between Kolkata's East Bengal Club and Rajshahi District football team.

== Death ==
Mridha had been suffering from typhoid followed by pneumonia before his death on 30 March 2010 in Rajshahi.
