= Alokdia Union =

Alokdia Union আলোকদিয়া ইউনিয়ন
- Location of Alokdia Union in Bangladesh
- Coordinates: 24.660474°N 90.013720°E
- Country: Bangladesh
- Division: Dhaka Division
- District: Tangail District
- Upazila: Madhupur Upazila
- Established on: 1984

Government
  - Type: Union Council
  - Chairman: Abu Sayeed Talukdar Dulal (Bangladesh Awami League)

Area
  - Total: 29.73 km^{2} (11.48 sq mi)
- Elevation: 20 m (66 ft)

Population (2011)
  - Total: 34,588
  - Density: 1,163/km^{2} (3,013/sq mi)
- Time zone: UTC+6 (BST)
- Postal code: 1996
- Website: alokdiaup.tangail.gov.bd

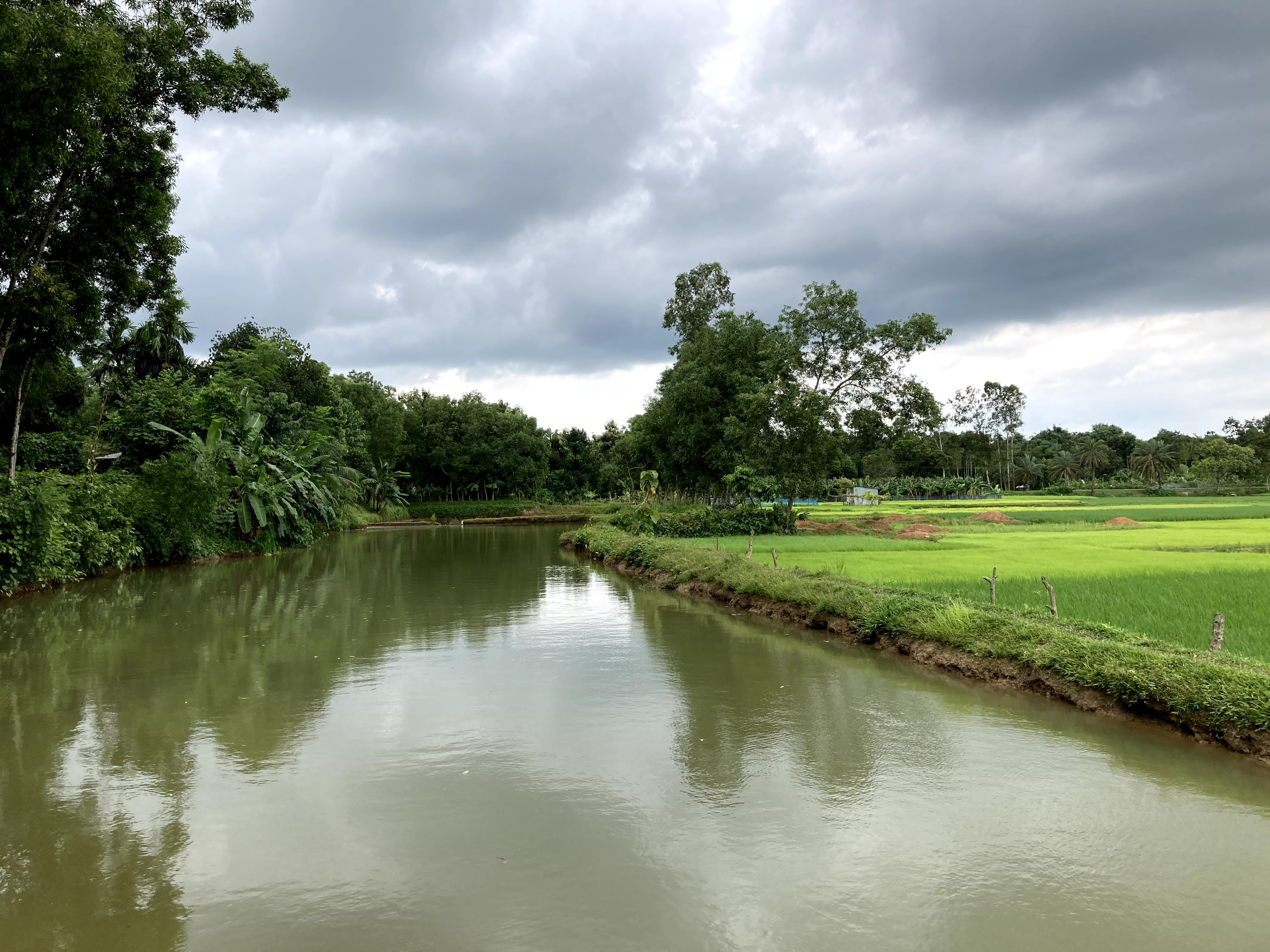
Nature of Beribaid, a village in Tangail district under Madhupur Upazilla

Alokdia Union (Bengali: আলোকদিয়া ইউনিয়ন) is a union of Madhupur Upazila, Tangail District, Bangladesh. It is situated 7 km south of Madhupur and 53 km northeast of Tangail.

== Demographics ==
According to Population Census 2011 performed by Bangladesh Bureau of Statistics, The total population of Alokdia union is 34588. There are 8969 households in total.

== Education ==
The literacy rate of Alokdia Union is 37.3% (Male-38.9%, Female-35.7%).

There are three high schools in the union: Ahammed Ali Memorial High School, Alokdia High School, and Kalamajhi Girl's High School.

== See also ==
- Union Councils of Tangail District
