= Madhupur Upazila =

Madhupur মধুপুর
- Upazila
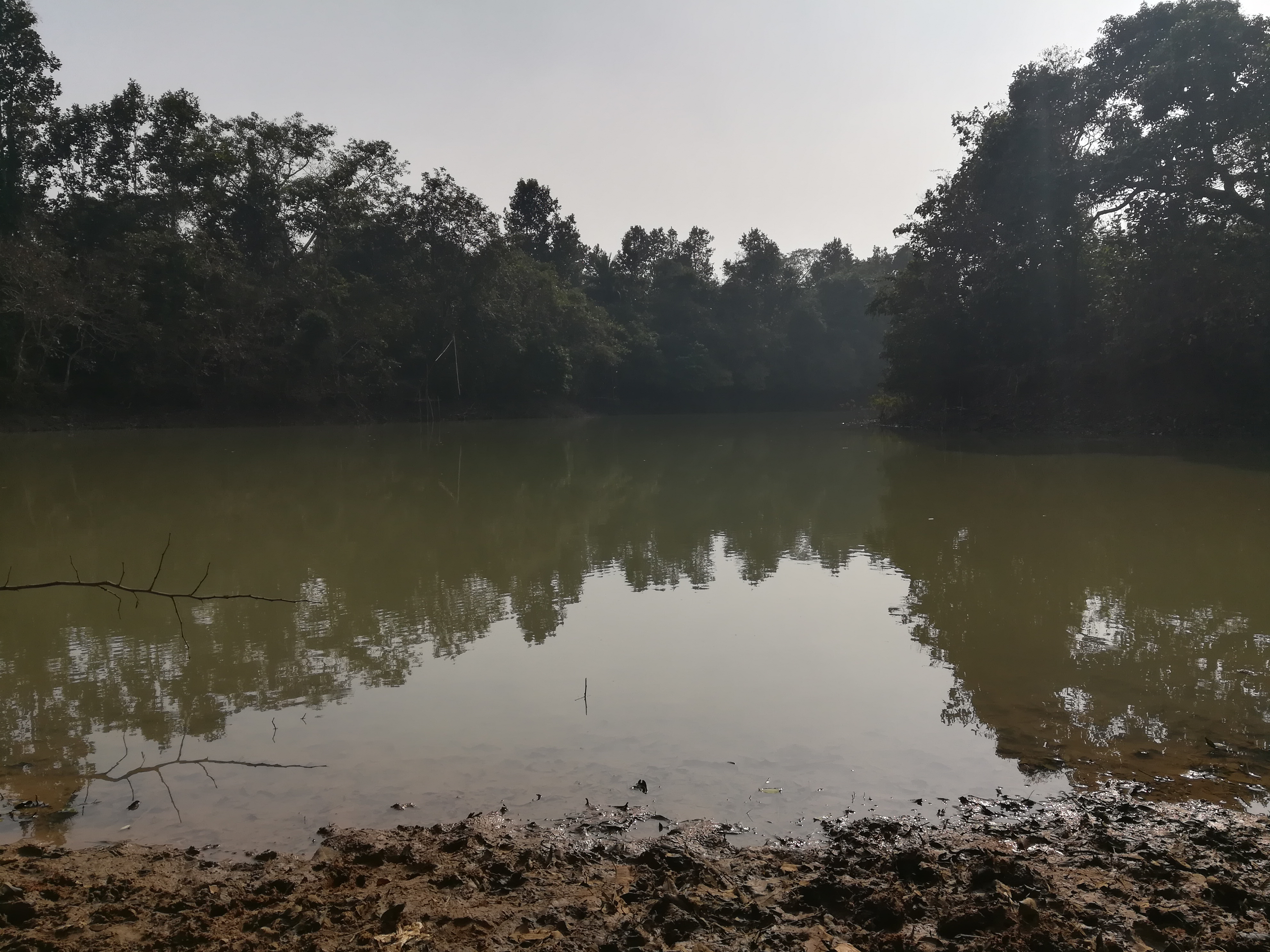
- Lake in Madhupur National Park

- Coordinates: 24°37′N 90°1.5′E
- Country: Bangladesh
- Division: Dhaka
- District: Tangail
- Parliamentary Area: Tangail-1

Area
  - Total: 366.92 km^{2} (141.67 sq mi)

Population (2022)
  - Total: 337,393
  - Density: 919.53/km^{2} (2,381.6/sq mi)
- Time zone: UTC+6 (BST)
- Postal code: 1996
- Area code: 09228
- Website: madhupur.tangail.gov.bd

Madhupur (Bengali: মধুপুর) is an upazila of Tangail District in the Division of Dhaka, Bangladesh.

Madhupur Upazila mauza geocode map

== Geography ==
Madhupur is located at 24.6167°N 90.0250°E. It has 75,903 households and total area of 366.92 km^{2}. It has a large forest area named 'Madhupurer Gor". Madhupur is famous throughout the country for delicious pineapples. Madhupur is bounded by Jamalpur Sadar upazila on the north, Gopalpur and Ghatail upazilas on the south, Muktagachha and Fulbaria upazilas on the east. Sarishabari and Gopalpur upazilas on west. Main rivers are Jhinai, Bangshi, Banar and Atrai.

== Demographics ==
Religions in Madhupur Upazila (2022)
Religion	Percent
Islam	92.18%
Christianity	4.28%
Hinduism	3.52%
Other or not stated	0.02%

According to the 2022 Bangladeshi census, Madhupur Upazila had 88,321 households and a population of 337,393. 9.04% of the population were under 5 years of age. Madhupur had a literacy rate (age 7 and over) of 65.93%: 67.81% for males and 64.09% for females, and a sex ratio of 99.09 males for every 100 females. 74,121 (21.97%) lived in urban areas.

According to the 2011 Census of Bangladesh, Madhupur Upazila had 75,903 households and a population of 296729. 68,000 (22.92%) were under 10 years of age. Madhupur had a literacy rate (age 7 and over) of 41.20%, compared to the national average of 51.8%, and a sex ratio of 1009 females per 1000 males. 64,872 (21.86%) lived in urban areas. According to the 2022 census, total population was 337,393. Ethnic population was 14,443(4.28%) in which Garo was 9,855.

Population of upazila by ethnicity (2022)
1. Bengali (95.7%)
2. Garo (3.67%)
3. Others (0.61%)

== Economy ==
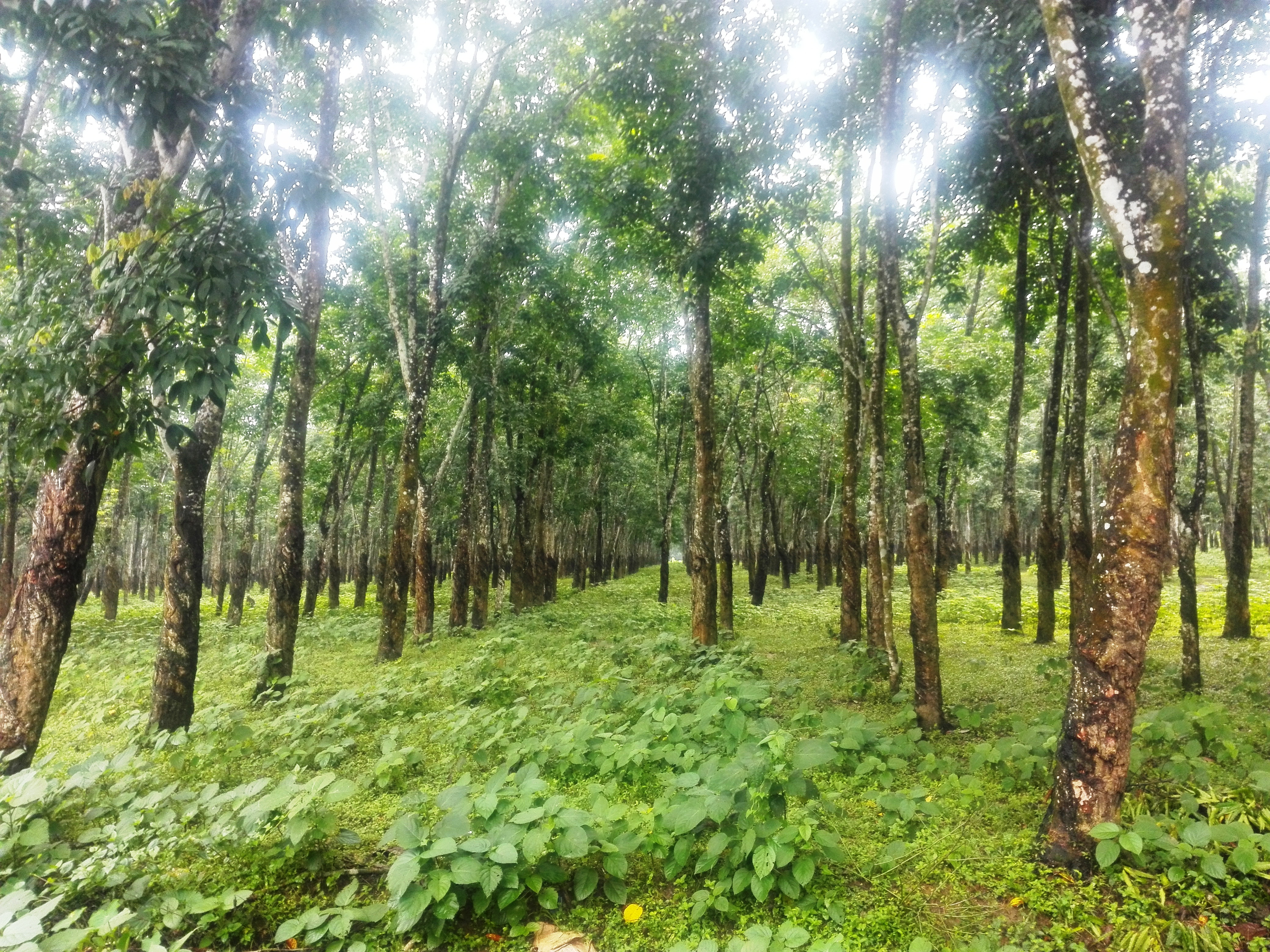
Rubber garden, pirgacha, Tangail

Land use Total land cultivable 32900 hectares, fallow land 2000 hectares; land under irrigation 65%.

Value of land The market value of the land of the first grade is Tk 10000 per 0.01 hectare. Main crops are paddy, jute, wheat, cotton, potato, patal, ginger, betel leaf, kasava and vegetables. Extinct and nearly extinct crops Indigo, varieties of pulses and aman paddy. Main fruits are mango, jackfruit, litchi, papaya, pineapple and olive.

Fisheries, dairies, poultries Fishery 18, dairy 28, poultry 103, hatchery 1. Communication facilities Roads: pucca 150 km, semi pucca 19 km; waterways 32 nautical mile. Traditional transport Palanquin (extinct).

Manufactories Silk mill 1, rice and flour mill 53, ice factory 17, lathe & welding 63, saw mill 109, bakery 7 and bidi factory 1.

Cottage industries Weaving 27, goldsmith 103, blacksmith 26, bamboo work 320, potteries 43, wood work 42, tailoring 216; apiculture by private initiative. Hats, bazars Hats and bazars are 45, most noted of which are Madhupur, Dhanbari and Garo Hat; fairs 3 (Sholakudi Mela, Dhanbari Baishakhi Mela & Dhalpur Boishakhi Mela).

The main exports are pineapple, silk, cotton, jackfruit and honey. NGO activities Operationally important NGOs are brac, asa, Proshika and caritas, World Tourist Mission, Family and Child Welfare Centre, World Vision Bangladesh.

== Administration ==
Madhupur Upazila is divided into Madhupur Municipality and six union parishads: Alokdia, Arankhola, Ausnara, Golabari, Mirzabari, and Sholakuri. The union parishads are subdivided into 111 mauzas and 180 villages.

Madhupur Municipality is subdivided into 9 wards and 23 mahallas.

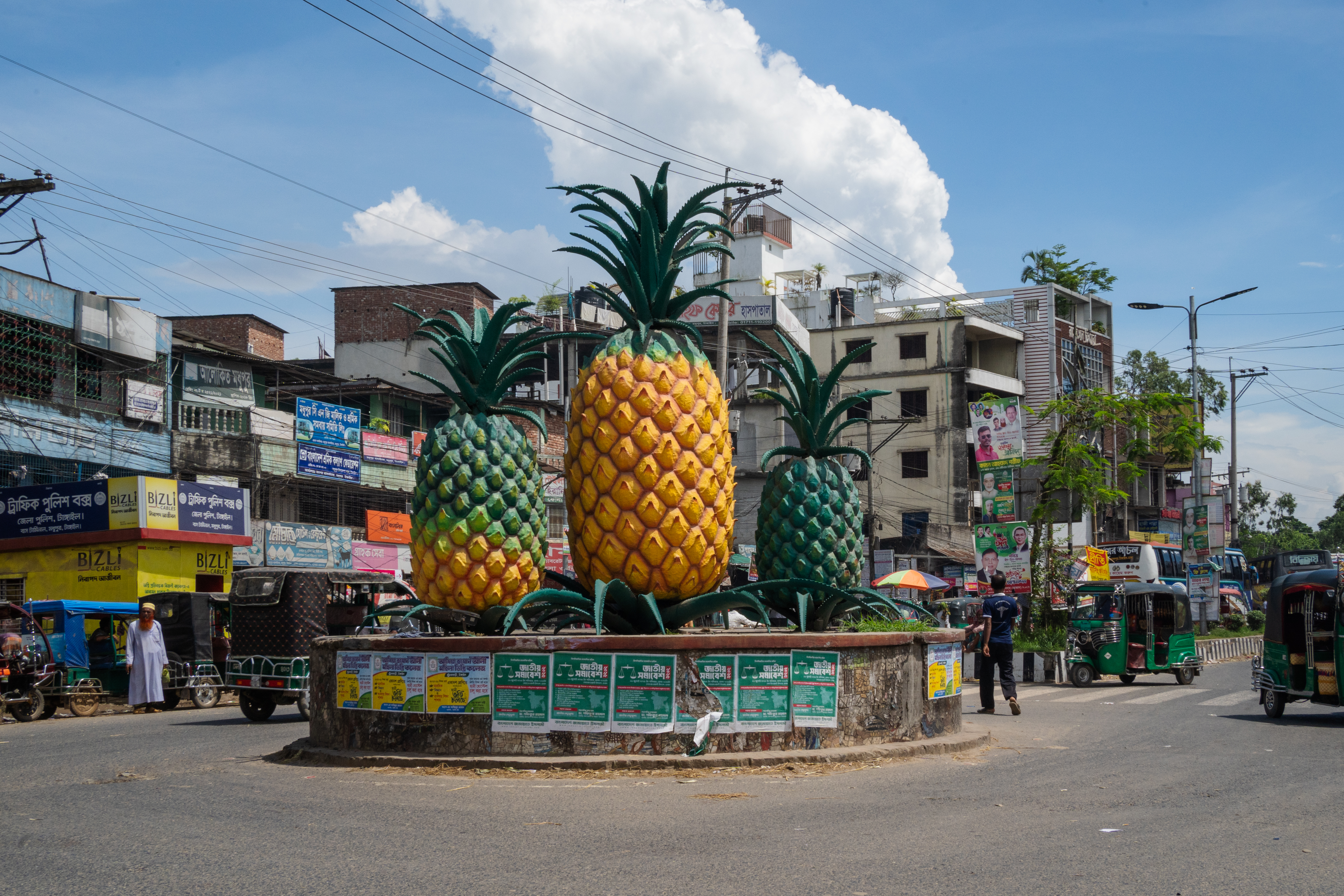
Anarosh Chattar, Madhupur.

== Photo gallery ==
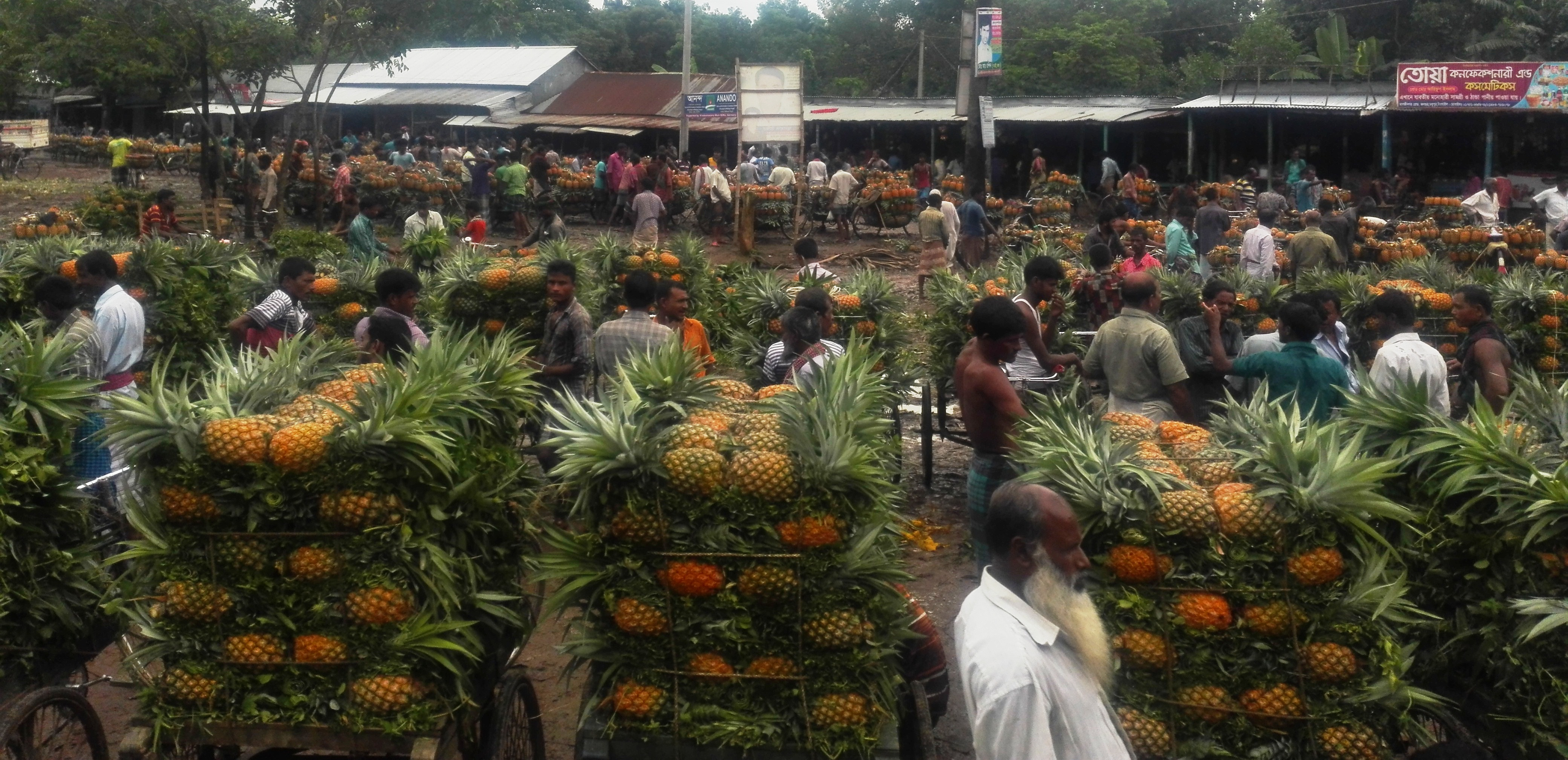
Pineapple market, Jolsotro

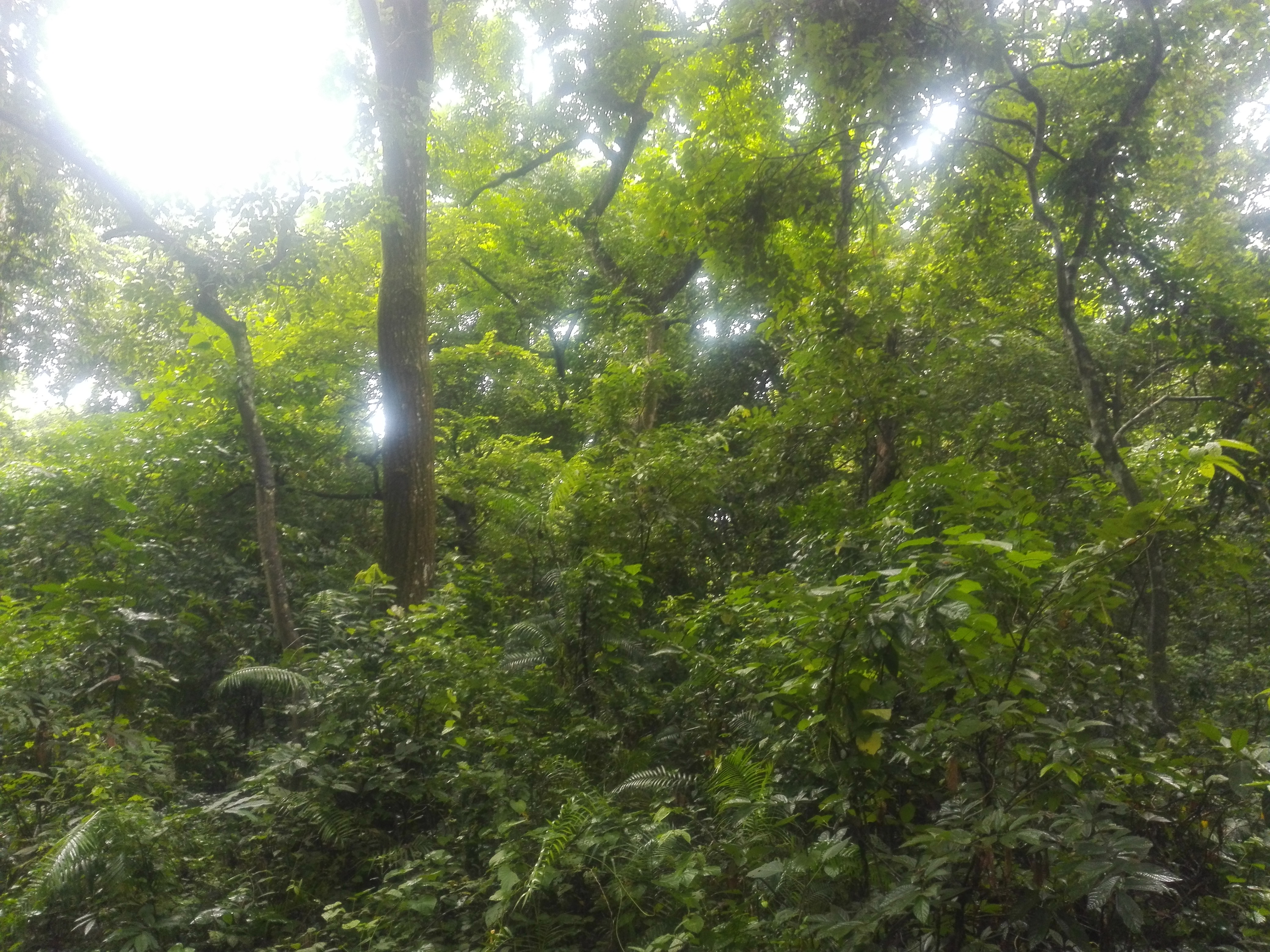
Madhupur National Park

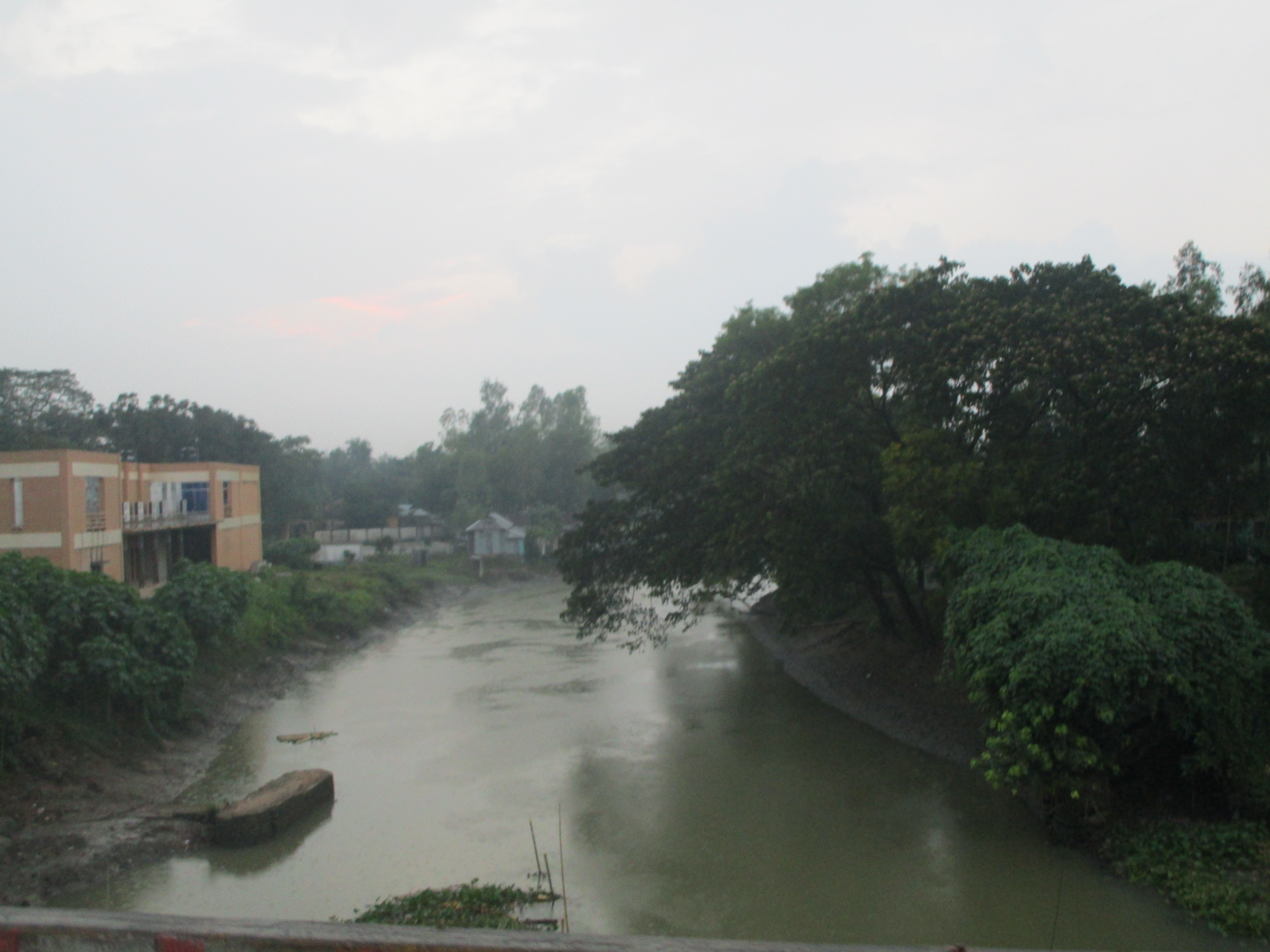
Bangshi River

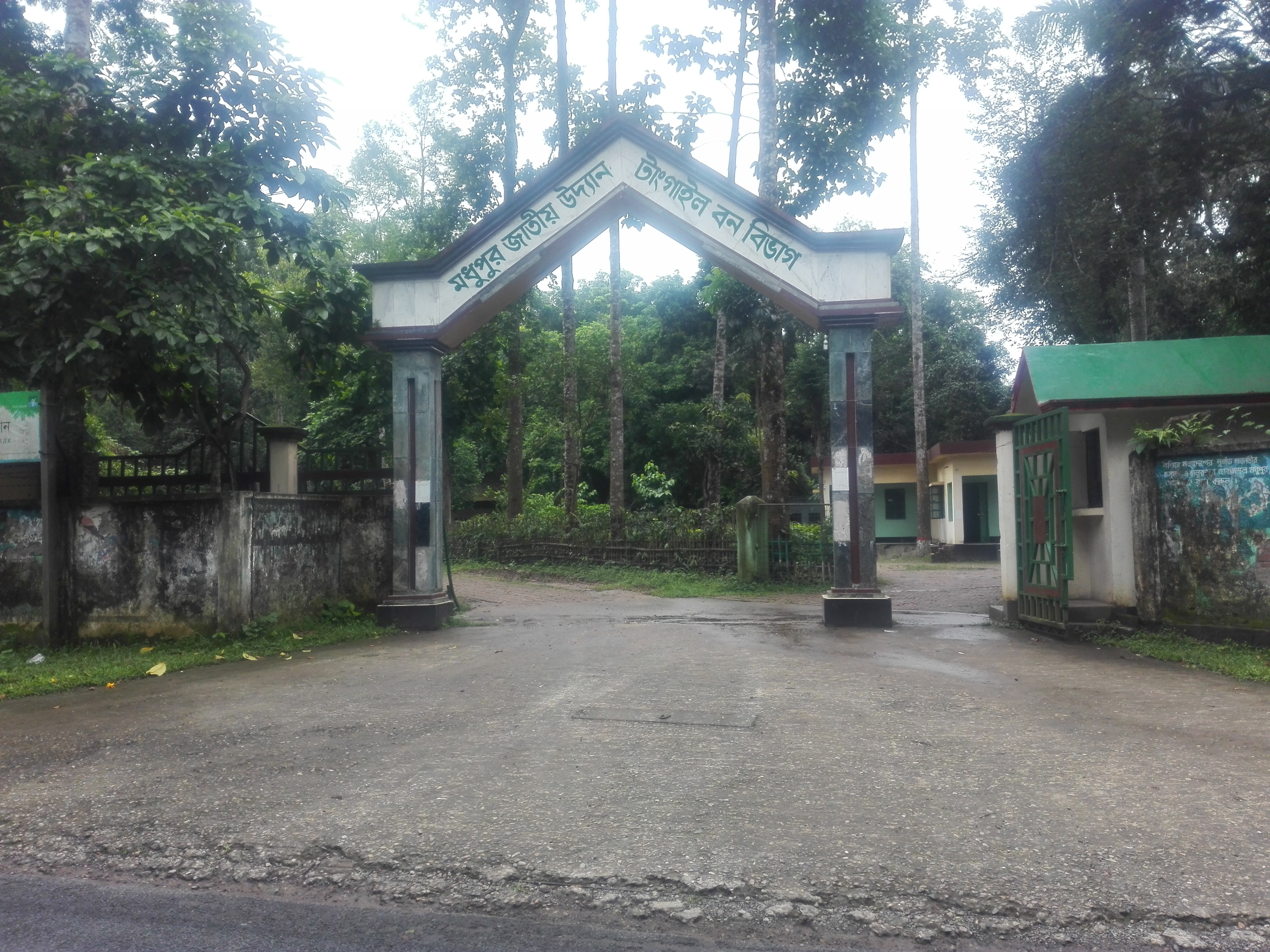
Main Gate of Madhupur National Park

== Education ==
- Madhupur Rani Bhabani Model High School
- Gangair Ahammad Ali Memorial High School
- Courpus Christy Primary School and High School
- Madhupur Shahid Smrity Higher Secondary School
- Alokdia High School
- Madhupur College
- Pirgacha Saint Pauls High School
- Madhupur Bahumukhi Model Technical Institute
- Brahminbari High School

== Notable residents ==
- Edric Baker, medical doctor, ran a low cost health clinic in the upazila from 1996 until his death in 2015.

== See also ==
- Edric Baker, medical doctor, ran a low cost health clinic in the upazila from 1996 until his death in 2015.
- Dokhala Forest Jame Mosque
- Jalchatra Bazaar, Bangladesh
- Madhupur, Bangladesh
- Upazilas of Bangladesh
- Districts of Bangladesh
- Divisions of Bangladesh
- Madhupur National Park, Deer Breeding Center, Tourist tower
