= Madhupur National Park =

National park in Bangladesh

- IUCN category II (national park)
- Location within Bangladesh
- Location: Tangail District, Madhupur Upazila Dhaka Division, Bangladesh
- Nearest city: Madhupur
- Coordinates: 24°45′00″N 90°05′00″E
- Area: 8,436 ha (20,850 acres)
- Established: 1982

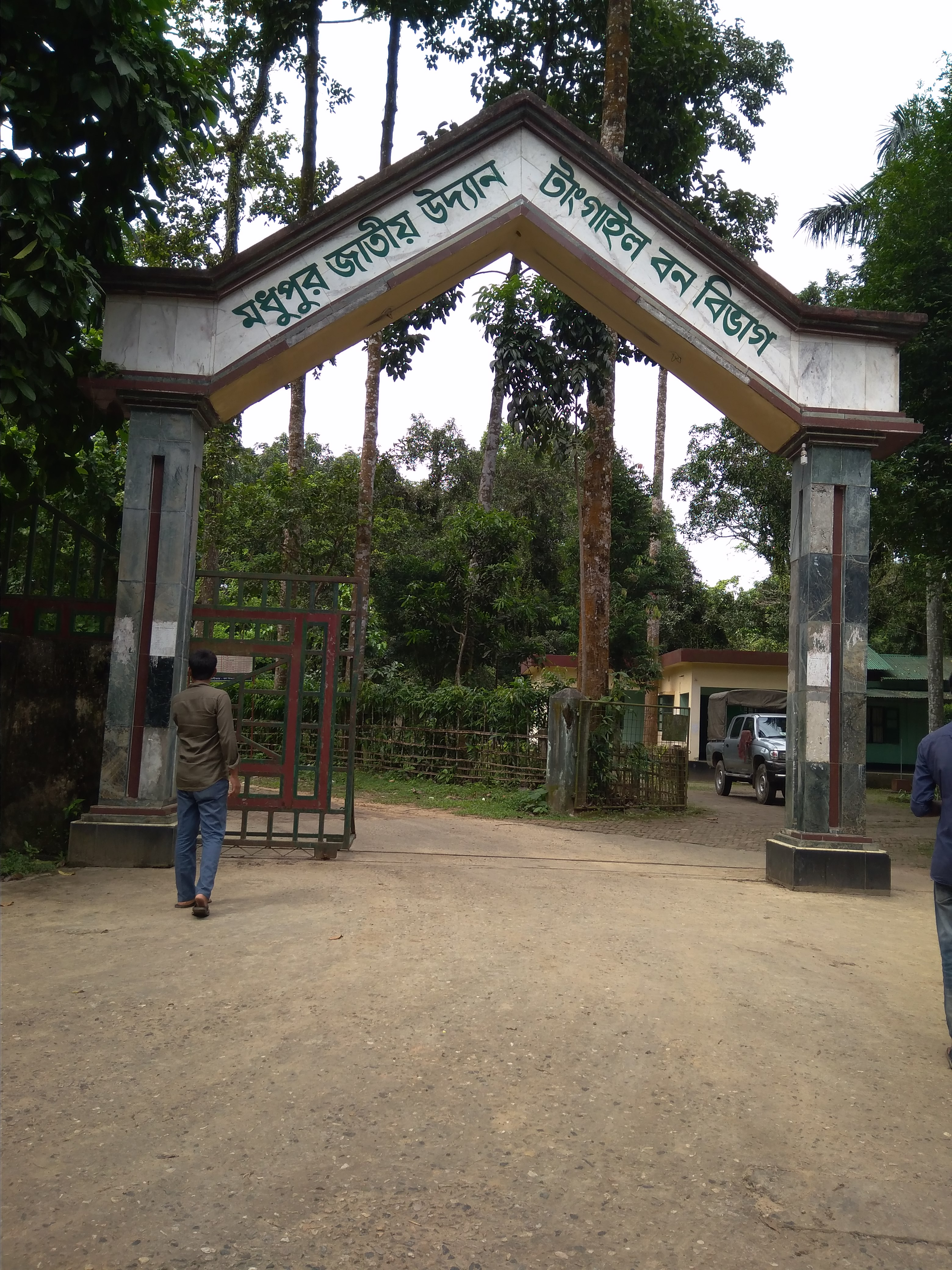
Madhupur National Park

Madhupur National Park (Bengali: মধুপুর জাতীয় উদ্যান) is a major and one of the earliest national park in Bangladesh.

== Description ==
Madhupur National Park covers an area of 8,436 ha (20,850 acres). The Forest was established as a national park by the Pakistan government in 1962 but, was officially declared as National park in 1982 under the Bangladesh wildlife (Preservation) Amendment Act of 1947. The park is located at Madhupur Upazila, Tangail District in the North region of the country. It is about 125 kilometres (78 mi) away from Dhaka. The local topography mainly consists of flat topped ridges (Chalas) intersected by numerous depressions (Baids).

== Climate ==
The climate is generally moderate. The temperature rises up to 37 °C in May and drops down to minimum 10 °C in January. The park has a season of tropical monsoon from June to September every year. The soil is loamy, clay and sandy loam at various places. The altitude rises to 15 m (49 ft) above mean sea level.

== Biodiversity ==
=== Flora ===
The general walk in the forest is easy due to the flat terrain. About 40% of the forest area is covered with Sal (Shorea robusta) trees. Madhupur forest is considered one of the best Sal forests in the entire Bangladesh. The sal trees grow in association with Dillenia pentagyna, Lagerstroemia parviflora, Adina cordifolia, Miliusa velutina, Lannea coromandelica, Albizia spp., Bauhinia variegata, Spondias pinnata, Butea monosperma and Barringtonia acutangula. The undergrowth is shrubby, which includes Chromolaena odorata, Pennisetum setosum, Asparagus racemosus and Rauvolfia serpentina. Plantations of Teak Tectona grandis, Senna siamea, Morus spp., Terminalia arjuna and Syzygium cumini were made in the park area. 176 plant species were identified in the park, which include 73 tree species, 22 shrub species, 27 climbers, 45 medicinal plants, 8 grasses and 1 palm species.

=== Fauna ===
Since long back, Madhupur forest was rich in wildlife and was famous for tigers (now extinct). The fauna consists of 190 species which include 21 mammals, 140 birds, and 29 snakes.

== Human settlement ==
There is large human habitation inside and along the National park area. Some 4500 Garo tribals were allowed for the settlement inside the park in 1968. In 1989, the human population was about 14,000. Paddy is primarily cultivated in plains and pineapple and cassava is cultivated as a commercial crop on higher lands.

== See also ==
- List of protected areas of Bangladesh
