= Board of Intermediate and Secondary Education, Dhaka =

Education Board Operated by the Government of Bangladesh

Coordinates: 23.723303°N 90.393244°E

- মাধ্যমিক ও উচ্চমাধ্যমিক শিক্ষা বোর্ড, ঢাকা
- Emblem of the Dhaka Education Board

Board overview
- Formed: 7 May 1921; 104 years ago
- Jurisdiction: Government of Bangladesh
- Headquarters: 5 Joynag Rd, Dhaka
- Board executives: Professor Dr. Khandokar Ehsanul Kabir, Chairman; Professor Dr. Md. Jahangir Alam, Secretary; SM Kamal Uddin Haider, Controller of Examination
- Parent department: Ministry of Education
- Website: dhakaeducationboard.gov.bd

The Board of Intermediate and Secondary Education, Dhaka is an autonomous organization and responsible for holding public examinations (JSC, SSC and HSC) in Dhaka Division and for providing recognition to the newly established non-government educational institutions and also for the supervision, control and developments of those institutions. The board office is located at Bakshibazar, Dhaka.

== History ==
Board of Intermediate and Secondary Education, Dhaka was established on 7 May 1921 according to the recommendation of Sadler Commission. Intermediate colleges and high schools in Dhaka city and Islamic intermediate colleges and high madrasah of greater Bengal were under control of that board. An advisory board made by the director of public education department of greater Bengal was given the authority to govern the board.

Dhaka Board was dissolved in September 1947 by a government order. Its name was changed to East Bengal Secondary Education Board in 1955 and it was live till 1961. Scope of this new board was limited to secondary level education of then the East province of Pakistan and control of intermediate education was shifted to the University of Dhaka.

Responsibility of intermediate education was given to the board from the university in 1961 and board was named Board of Intermediate and Secondary Education, East Pakistan and after liberation, it was named Board of Intermediate and Secondary Education, Dhaka with the scope of operation within Dhaka Division.

== District under Dhaka Education Board ==
- Dhaka District
- Faridpur District
- Gazipur District
- Gopalganj District, Bangladesh
- Kishoreganj District
- Madaripur District
- Manikganj District
- Munshiganj District
- Narayanganj District
- Narsingdi District
- Rajbari District
- Shariatpur District
- Tangail District

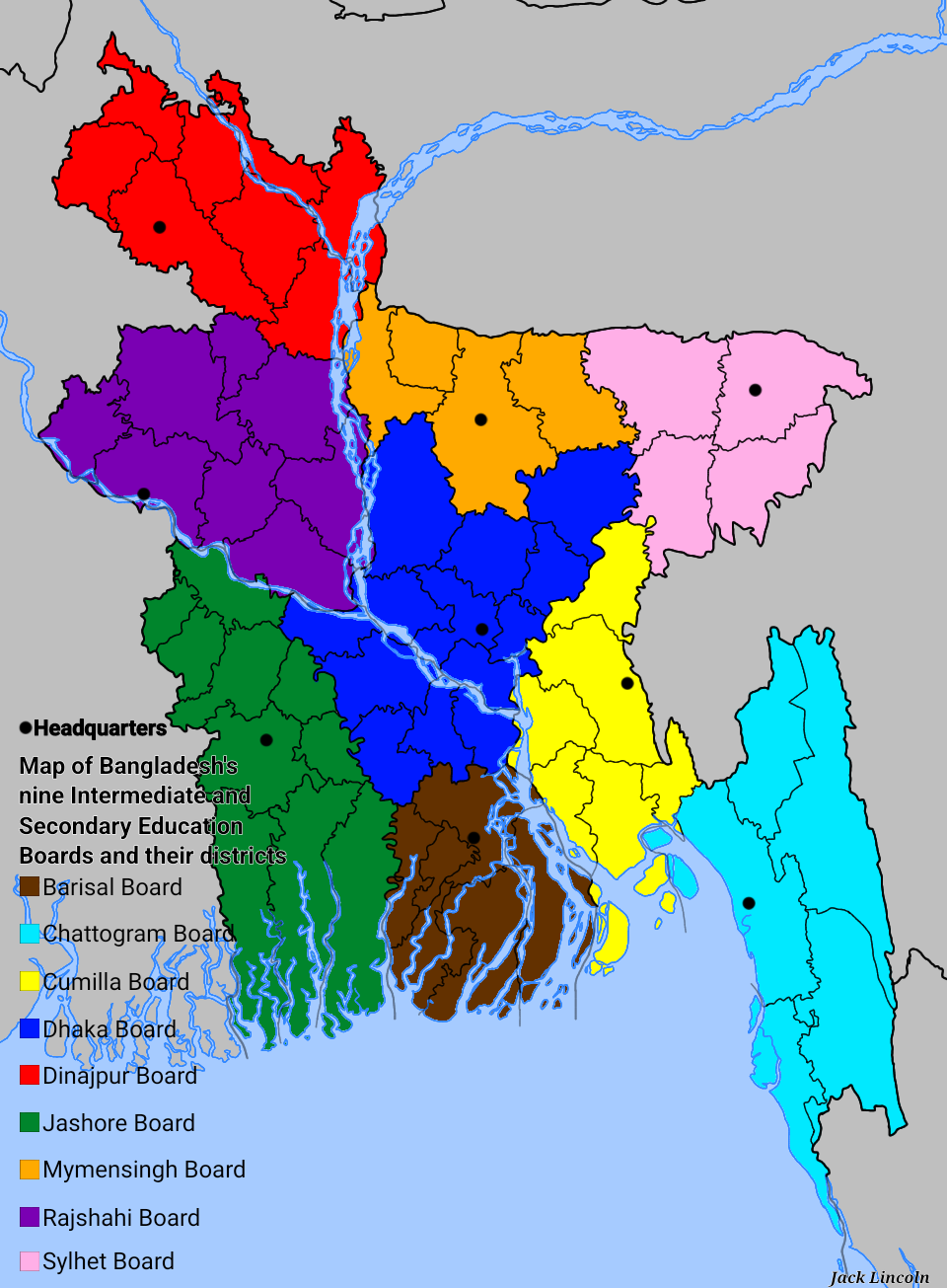
Map of Bangladesh's nine Intermediate and Secondary Education Boards and their districts

== See also ==
- List of Intermediate and Secondary Education Boards in Bangladesh
