= Madhupur, Bangladesh =

Madhupur মধুপুর
- Town
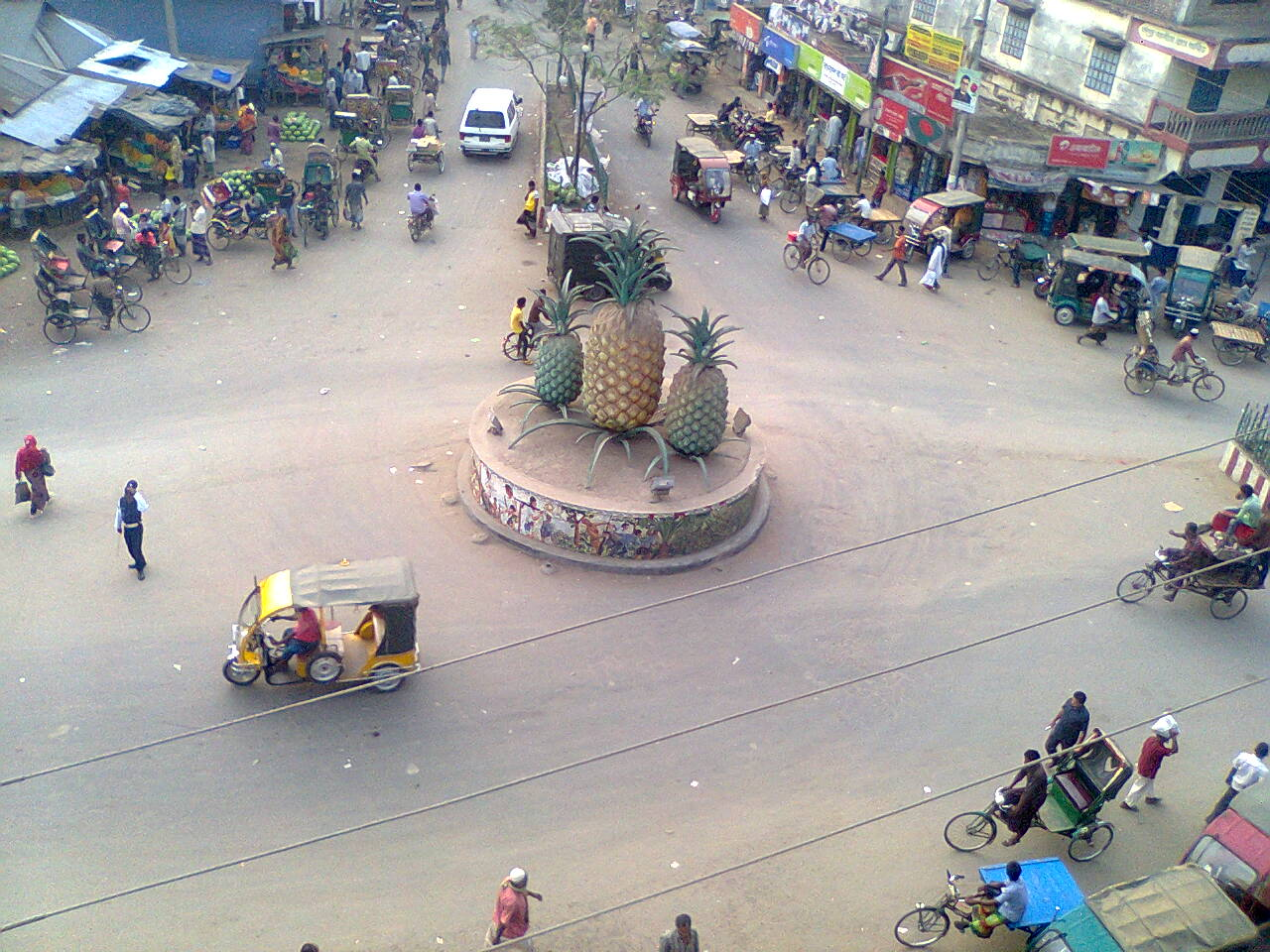
- Madhupur Bus Stand, Tri-junction of three important roads of Bangladesh, The three roads goes to Tangail, Mymensingh and Jamalpur respectively. The pineapples signify the pineapple-growing area around Madhupur.

- Location within Bangladesh
- Coordinates: 24°37′N 90°1.5′E
- Country: Bangladesh
- Division: Dhaka Division
- District: Tangail District
- Upazila: Madhupur Upazila
- Incorporated: 1995

Government
  - Type: Pourashava
  - Mayor: vacant

Area
  - Total: 24.77 km^{2} (9.56 sq mi)

Population
  - Total: 56,342
  - Density: 2,275/km^{2} (5,891/sq mi)
- Time zone: UTC+6 (BST)
- Postal codes: 1996
- Area code: 9228
- Website: madhupur.tangail.gov.bd

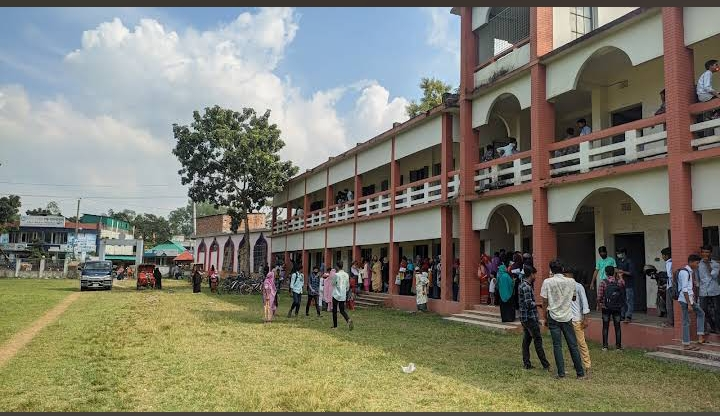
Madhupur Rani Bhabani Model High School

Madhupur (Bengali: মধুপুর) is a town of Madhupur Upazila, Tangail, Bangladesh. The town is 51 kilometres (32 mi) northeast of Tangail city, 47 kilometres (29 mi) southwest of Mymensingh, and 137 kilometres (85 mi) northwest of Dhaka, the capital.

== Demographics ==
According to the 2011 Bangladesh census, Madhupur town had 13,713 households and a population of 56,342. The literacy rate (age 7 and over) was 56.7% (male: 58.7%, female: 54.5%).

== See also ==
- Dhanbari
- Ghatail
- Jalchatra Bazaar, Bangladesh
