= Madhupur Garh =

Plateau in north-central Bangladesh

Coordinates: 24°34′13″N 90°8′10″E

Extent of Madhupur tract in Bangladesh

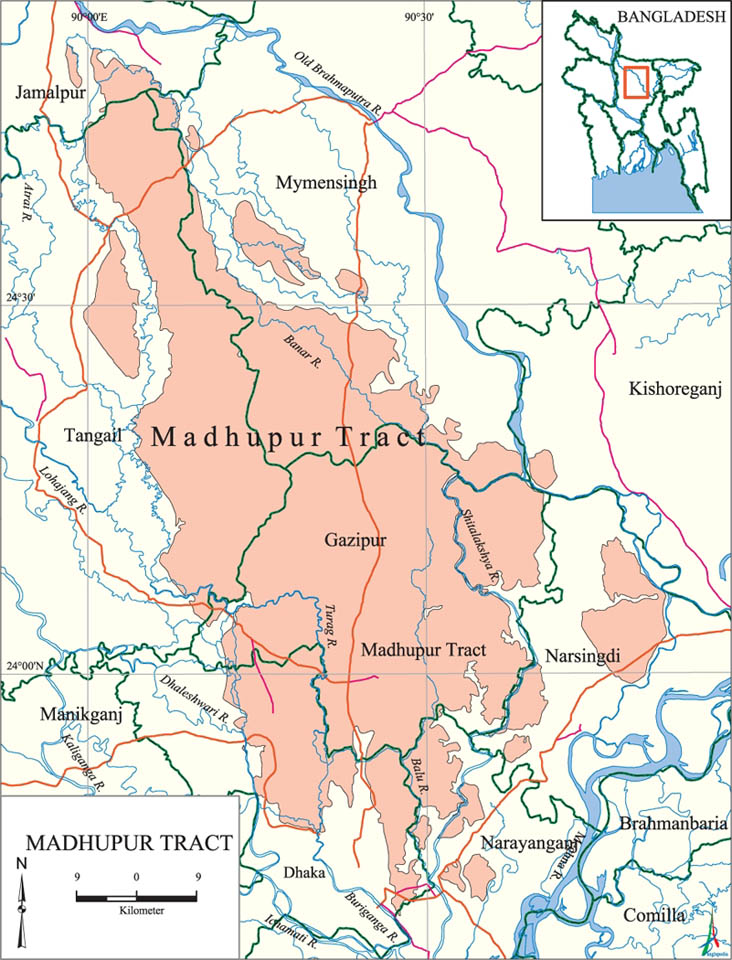
Bhawal-Madhupur Tract and its surrounding region

Madhupur Garh, also known as Madhupur Sal Forest or Madhupur Jungle, is a large forested area and elevated region located in the central part of Bangladesh. The Madhupur Garh region stretches from the southern part of Jamalpur District in the north to Fatullah Thana of Narayanganj Sadar Upazila in the south. Most areas of Tangail and Gazipur Districts, as well as Dhaka City, are included within this Garh region. The northern part of the Garh is known as Madhupur Garh, and the southern part is known as Bhawal Garh. Madhupur National Park has been formed from the portion of the Garh located in Madhupur Upazila, and Bhawal National Park has been formed from a portion located in Gazipur.

After the Madhupur forest came under the jurisdiction of the Forest Department in 1962, initiatives were taken to conserve the biodiversity of the forest. According to the Bangladesh Wildlife (Preservation) Order of 1974, with the aim of biodiversity conservation, an area of 84,366 hectares of this forest was declared as two national parks, named Madhupur and Bhawal, in 1982.

== Structure ==
The land in this region is slightly elevated compared to the adjacent floodplains formed by deposition and is composed of halloysite and illite. These together have formed an elongated terrain stretching north to south, which is part of a memorial paleosol. In the Upper Pleistocene period, due to heavy rainfall and various erosional processes, several Pleistocene terraces became separated in this region. Later, these terraces became connected with one another and were filled with fertile alluvial soil in open areas, forming the floodplains.

The central highland is composed of a highly weathered and leached reddish-brown deposit or primitive rock known as the Madhupur Clay. This deposit was formed in the Late Pleistocene due to climatic factors and consists of several disjointed Pleistocene terraces. It is the second largest Pleistocene terrace in Bangladesh. The clay developed in a depositional fluvial environment and, according to geologists, was formed approximately 0.97 to 0.90 million years ago.

== Biodiversity ==
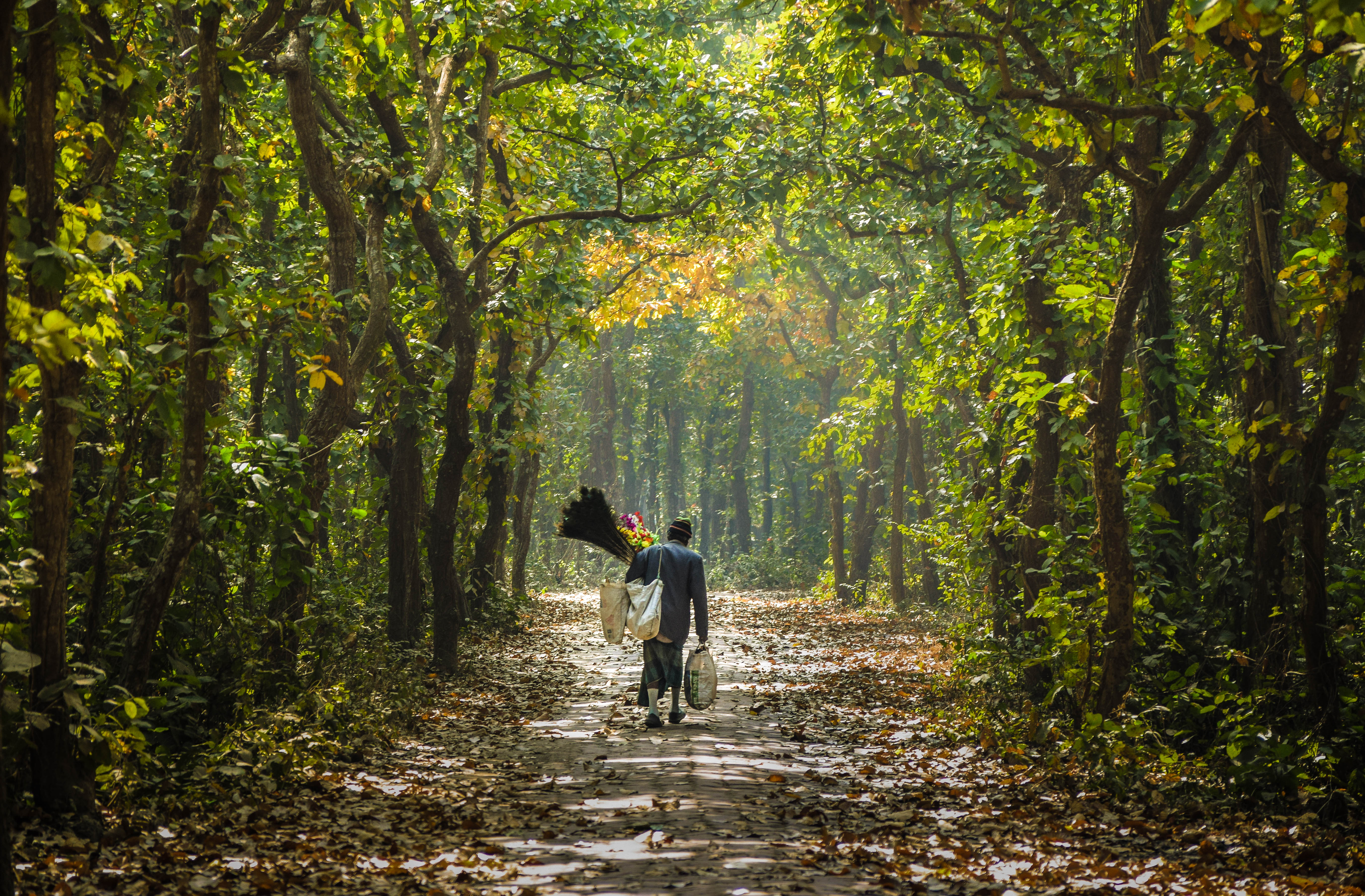
Madhupur National Park

Madhupur Garh is the third-largest natural forest in Bangladesh and is rich in biodiversity. About 190 animal species are found in the Garh area. In Madhupur National Park, 21 species of mammals, 140 species of birds, and 29 species of reptiles and amphibians have been recorded. Notable animals include the capped langur, rhesus monkey, barking deer, porcupine, wild boar, clouded leopard; among the various bird species are the kingfisher, brown wood owl, jungle fowl, etc. In the past, animals like elephants, tigers, leopards, and peacocks used to roam in Madhupur Garh. From 1868 to 1876, a total of 413 elephants were hunted in Madhupur Garh. According to the Forest Department, Bhawal Garh contains 64 species of animals, including 6 species of mammals, 9 species of reptiles, 10 species of amphibians, and 39 species of birds.

There are about 176 species of various plants in the Madhupur jungle. Among them are 73 species of trees, 22 species of shrubs, 27 species of climbers, 8 species of grasses, 1 species of palm tree, and 45 species of medicinal plants. Additionally, several exotic plant species have been planted under the initiative of the Forest Department. The most commonly seen tree in Madhupur Garh is the sal or gazari tree, which is why it is also known as a sal forest. Notable plants include sal, mahua, bahera, amlaki, turmeric, amra, jiga, bhadi, aswattha, banyan, serpentina, shatamuli, jayna, bidha, har goja, behula, etc. Moreover, fruit-bearing plants such as mango, jackfruit, black plum, and guava are found throughout the region.

== See also ==
- Bhawal National Park
- Geology of Bangladesh
- Geography of Bangladesh
