= Tangail =

City and district headquarter in Tangail District

Tangail টাঙ্গাইল
- City
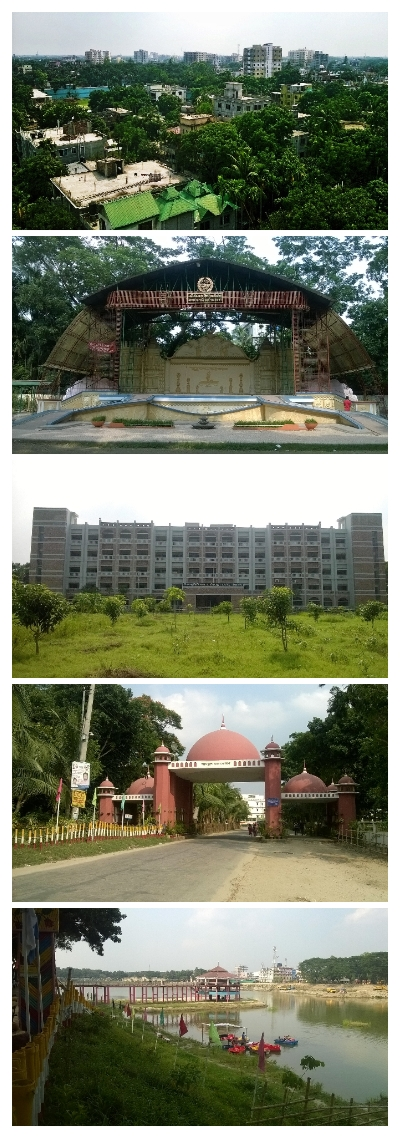
- From top to bottom: 1. The city skyline from "Suparibagan"; 2. The Open Stage of Tangail Poura Uddan; 3. Tangail District Court Building; 4. The city gate, Shamsul Huq Toron"; 5. DC Lake at District Headquarters

- Location of Tangail in Bangladesh Tangail (Bangladesh)
- Coordinates: 24.2644°N 89.9181°E
- Country: Bangladesh
- Division: Dhaka
- District: Tangail
- Upazila: Tangail Sadar
- Incorporated: 1969

Government
  - Type: Administration
  - Deputy commissioner: Abu Sayied

Area
  - Total: 29.04 km^{2} (11.21 sq mi)
- Elevation: 14 m (46 ft)

Population (2022)
  - Total: 212,887▲
  - Density: 7,331/km^{2} (18,990/sq mi)
- Time zone: UTC+6 (BST)
- Postal codes: 1900, 1901, 1902
- Area code: 0921
- Website: tangailpourashava.gov.bd

Tangail (Bengali: টাঙ্গাইল, [ʈaŋgail]) is a city of Tangail District in central Bangladesh. The establishment of the Tangail began with 3269 square kilometres of land requisitioned from Mymensingh. Earlier it was a Mahakuma of Mymensingh district. Tangail lies on the bank of the Louhajang River.

== Etymology ==
Many believe the name Tangail originated from the Bengali word tanga, meaning horse cart.

== History ==
Tangail has been a local business center since the early 19th century. In 1860, Tangail became the 4th ranking area of the Greater Mymensingh District due to its fertile land near the Louhajong River. It was close to Begun Bari, Mymensingh. In 1969, Tangail District was established.

=== Tangail Airdrop ===
The Tangail Airdrop was a successful battalion-size operation by India's Para Commandos, mounted on 11 December 1971, by the 2nd Battalion (Special Operations) (2 PARA) of the Indian Army's Parachute Regiment during the Indo-Pakistani War of 1971 for the liberation of Bangladesh. The operation's main objective was capturing Poongli Bridge on the Jamuna River, which would cut off the Pakistani 93rd Brigade, which was retreating from Mymensingh in the north to defend the capital of East Pakistan, Dhaka, and its approaches. The paratroop unit was also tasked with linking up with the advancing Maratha Light Infantry on the ground to advance toward the East Pakistani capital.

The Pourasabha (municipal corporation) was established on 1 July 1887, and initially divided the city into five wards:

Ward No.	Area
1	Tangail Kanda Para, Par Dighulia, Akur Takur Para
2	Korer Betka, Mirer Betka, Nondir Betka, Sabalia, Dorun, Ashekpur, Nagor Jalfai, Boali
3	Garai, Berai, Kazipur, Bachrakandi, Potol, Bajitpur, Berabuchna, Valluk kandi
4	Kagmari, Sontosh, Aloa, Boitta, Patuli, Ekrampur
5	Kalipur, Dighulia, Sakrail, Kaiyamara, Beradoma, Basha, Khanpur

This was later restructured into four wards - Ward No. 1 (Central), 2 (Betka), 3 (Dighulia), and 4 (Santosh) - and then, in 1988, into six wards with the addition of Wards 5 (Zila Sadar) and 6 (Kazipur).

The first city election was held in November 1887, when the citizens elected eight ward commissioners from four wards. The Subdivision Commissioner of Tangail, Shashi Shekhar Dutt, was appointed as the first administrator of Tangail City. The city needed to be better developed, lacking paved roads and roadside lamps; subsequently, the regional zamindars and subdivision board provided financial support to dig ponds, lakes, and canals, creating a safe water supply.

Electricity was established in the city in the early 1930s. Paved roads were constructed in the 1960s, connecting the town to Dhaka. Simultaneously, bridges and culverts were installed.

In 1985, Tangail was promoted from a C to a B Class city. In 1989, the Pourashava was promoted to A-Class. In the 1990s, the city was financed by the Asian Development Bank and the Government of Bangladesh to develop water supply, sanitation, wastewater drainage, bus terminals, supermarkets, and other infrastructure.

In 1999, the city was restructured again into 18 wards (its current organization).

== Administration ==
Tangail has an area of 35.22 square kilometres (13.60 sq mi), divided into 18 wards and 64 mahallas.

Ward No.	Region	Households	Population (2011)
1	Akur Takur Para-north, Dewla, District hq	2070	10388
2	Enayetpur	2142	8760
3	West Akur Takur Para, North Kagmara, South Kagmara	3205	13903
4	Bepari Para, Fakir Para, Bera Doma, Dighulia, Char Dighulia	2119	9208
5	Kalipur, Lakshimpur, Sarutia, Shakrail	1614	7235
6	College Para, Paradise Para, Par Dighulia-part	1569	6712
7	Baluk Kandi, Bagbari, Patuli Bhabani Bagbari, Uttar Santosh-part, Santosh Palpara	1674	7325
8	Aloa Bhabani Pahim, Aloa Pahim, Dakshin Santosh-part	1797	8026
9	Aloa Baratia, Aloa Paikasta, Aloa Tarini, Baluk Kandi-part, Char Patuli, Purba Aloa, Aloa Bhabani	1888	8575
10	Bajitpur, Berai, Basrakandi, Kazipur, Patal	1458	6189
11	Berabuchna, Kachua Para, Kanda Para	1929	7536
12	Adi Tangail, Bepari Para, Bil Para	1628	7160
13	Tangail Mahalla, Chayanir Bazar, Pachanir Bazar, Thana Para, Uttar Thana Para	1792	7572
14	Purba Adalat Para, Adalat Para, Biswas Betka-part S.W corn, Shaha Para	2790	11786
15	Ashekpur, Biswas Betka-part	2745	12118
16	Akur Takur Para-part, Par Dighulia-part	2459	10670
17	Kumudini College Para, Munshi Para, Registry Para, Biswas Betka-west	2128	11081
18	Kodalia, Sabalia	2600	13168

The Bangladeshi government is planning to expand the city to a total area of 81.75 km^{2}.

== Geography and climate ==
The city of Tangail is in Dhaka Division, Central Bangladesh. The town lies in a low-lying floodplain near the Jamuna River, south of the high plateau of the Madhupur tract. The average elevation of Tangail is 14 meters (49 feet). Tangail experiences a humid subtropical climate (Köppen: Cwa) with a hot, humid tropical wet season (monsoon season) and warm, dry winter with high humidity year-round. The yearly average temperature in Tangail is 25.1 °C, and the average rainfall is 1817 mm.

Climate data for Tangail (1991–2020 normals, extremes 1982–present)
Month	Jan	Feb	Mar	Apr	May	Jun	Jul	Aug	Sep	Oct	Nov	Dec	Year
Record high °C (°F)	30.5 (86.9)	35.4 (95.7)	38.4 (101.1)	40.6 (105.1)	39.0 (102.2)	38.4 (101.1)	37.0 (98.6)	37.2 (99.0)	37.5 (99.5)	37.2 (99.0)	34.5 (94.1)	31.0 (87.8)	40.6 (105.1)
Mean daily maximum °C (°F)	23.8 (74.8)	27.6 (81.7)	31.9 (89.4)	33.8 (92.8)	33.5 (92.3)	33.0 (91.4)	32.3 (90.1)	32.5 (90.5)	32.5 (90.5)	32.0 (89.6)	29.6 (85.3)	25.6 (78.1)	30.7 (87.3)
Daily mean °C (°F)	16.6 (61.9)	20.3 (68.5)	24.9 (76.8)	27.7 (81.9)	28.3 (82.9)	28.8 (83.8)	28.7 (83.7)	28.9 (84.0)	28.5 (83.3)	26.9 (80.4)	22.9 (73.2)	18.5 (65.3)	25.1 (77.2)
Mean daily minimum °C (°F)	13.3 (55.9)	16.6 (61.9)	21.1 (70.0)	24.0 (75.2)	24.9 (76.8)	26.3 (79.3)	26.4 (79.5)	26.5 (79.7)	26.0 (78.8)	24.1 (75.4)	19.5 (67.1)	15.2 (59.4)	22.0 (71.6)
Record low °C (°F)	5.1 (41.2)	7.8 (46.0)	11.2 (52.2)	15.8 (60.4)	18.0 (64.4)	20.5 (68.9)	21.2 (70.2)	22.5 (72.5)	21.8 (71.2)	17.6 (63.7)	11.4 (52.5)	6.8 (44.2)	5.1 (41.2)
Average precipitation mm (inches)	7 (0.3)	20 (0.8)	40 (1.6)	112 (4.4)	260 (10.2)	320 (12.6)	331 (13.0)	265 (10.4)	271 (10.7)	160 (6.3)	19 (0.7)	9 (0.4)	1,814 (71.4)
Average precipitation days (≥ 1 mm)	1	2	4	7	13	17	21	19	15	8	1	1	109
Average relative humidity (%)	80	74	69	74	79	84	85	85	85	83	80	81	80
Mean monthly sunshine hours	197.9	216.4	237.7	226.5	202.4	152.2	147.1	152.7	152.0	215.3	230.5	206.4	2,337.1
Source 1: NOAA
Source 2: Bangladesh Meteorological Department (humidity 1981–2010)

== Demographics ==
Religions in Tangail Paurashava (2022)
Religion	Percent
Islam	89.58%
Hinduism	10.33%
Other or not stated	0.09%

According to the 2022 Bangladesh census, Tangail Paurashava had 52,553 households and a population of 212,887. Tangail had a literacy rate of 86.24%: 88.63% for males and 83.88% for females, and a sex ratio of 99.83 males per 100 females. 6.82% of the population was under 5 years of age.

According to the 2011 Bangladesh census, Tangail Paurashava had 37,607 households and a population of 167,412. 30,882 (18.45%) were under 10 years of age. Tangail has a literacy rate (age 7 and over) of 71.78%, compared to the national average of 59.5%, and a sex ratio of 976 females per 1000 males.

== Sports ==
At the city's centre, the multipurpose Tangail Stadium regularly hosts sporting events. The stadium has hosted national events.

== Transport ==
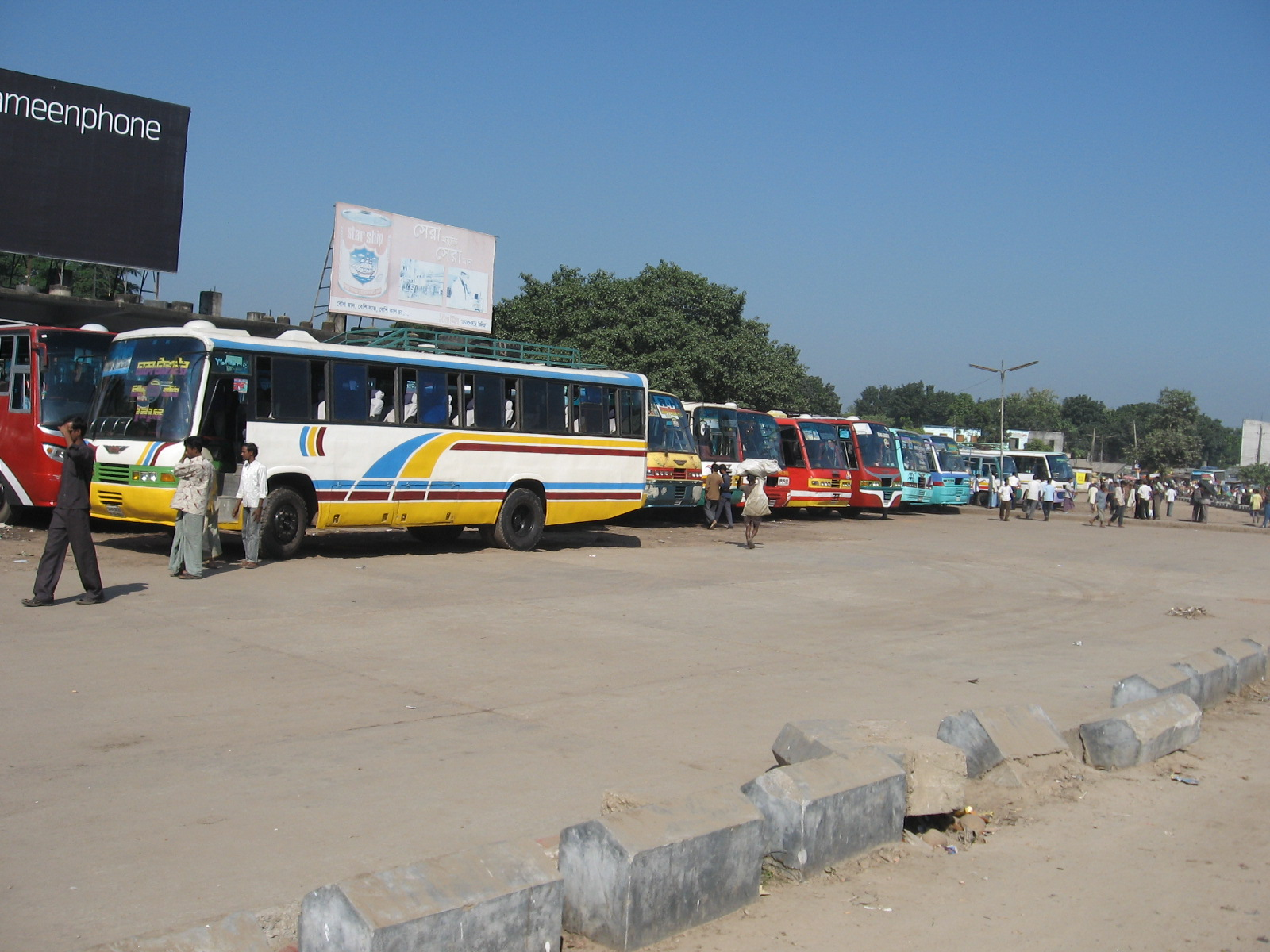
The "New Bus Terminal", Dewla, Tangail.

Jamuna Bridge, the second-longest bridge in Bangladesh, connects Tangail and Sirajganj.

It takes approximately 1 hour and 55 minutes to reach Tangail from Dhaka (about 98 km away) via Kaliakair and Tongi. Several bus lines operate between Tangail and Dhaka's Mohakhali (মহাখালী) bus terminal. The Nirala, Dhaleshwari, Jathika, and High Choice bus lines are among them.

Tangail railway station offers travel to Dhaka and other cities within Bangladesh. The inter-city Ekota Express, Sundarban Express, Rangpur Express, Intercity Tangail Commuter and Sirajganj Express (among others) serve the station alongside commuter rail and mail train services.

Tangail Airport was opened in 1967 for agricultural purposes but has been unmaintained since 1976.

== Traditional foods ==
- Chomchom is a well-known dessert from Tangail.
- Pineapple

== Parks ==
Tangail contains numerous parks, including Tangail Poura Uddan (one of the city's most-visited places), DC Lake, SP Park, and Soul Park. The town also contains part of the Madhupur National Park, one of Bangladesh's oldest national parks.

== Education ==
=== Schools ===
- Bindu Basini Govt. Boys' High School (established in 1880 by zamindar of Santosh of the famous Roy Chowdhury family)
- Bindu Basini Govt. Girls' High School (established in 1882 by zamindar of Santosh of the Roy Chowdhury family)
- Govt. Dhanbari Nawab Institution (established in 1910 by Syed Nawab Ali Chowdhury) famous zamindar of Dhanbari. He was also a founder member of Dhaka University
- Major Mahmudul Hasan High School, Makorkol.
- Miyavai International School and College, Madhupur (This school was established on 2 February 2022 by Boro Miya (Miya vai/Rasel Miya) of the famous Miya family of Madhupur.)
- Police Lines High School
- Sristy College of Tangail
- Tangail Polytechnic
- Santosh Jannabi Govt. High School
- Vivekananda High School
- Madhupur Shaheed Smriti Higher Secondary School & College, Madhupur
- Govt.Rani Bhavani Pilot High School, Madhupur
- A.R.L Memorial School and College, Madhupur
- Belayet Hossain Bahumukhi Uchcha Bidyaloy, Nallapara, Delduar
- Bharateshwari Homes, Mirzapur
- B.A.F Shaheen College, Pahar Kanchanpur
- Zila Sadar Girls' High School
- Shibnath High School
- P.T.I. High School
- Shaheen School and College
- Town Govt. Primary School
- Tangail Pre–Cadet School
- Bulbul Residential Model School, Tangail Sadar, Tangail
- Athail Shimul High School Ghatail Tangail
- Brammon Kushia Government Primary School, Brammon Kushia, Tangail
- Bararia Suruj Bisweswari High School, Bararia, Tangail
- Apon Pathshala, Tangail
- Ghatail Cantonment Public School & College
- Suti V.M Pilot High School, Gopalpur
- Gopal Dighi K.P. Union High School (Kaloha, Kalihat)

=== Higher education ===
- Mawlana Bhashani Science and Technology University, Santosh, Tangail
- Mawlana Bhashani Adarsha College.
- Govt. Moulana Mohammad Ali College.
- Tangail Medical College
- Kumudini Women's Medical College, Mirzapur
- Mirzapur Cadet College
- Major General Mahmudul Hassan Adarsha College.
- Sristy College of Tangail
- Madhupur Shahid Smrity Higher Secondary School & College, Madhupur
- Kumudini Government Mohila College
- GRB University, Madhupur
- A.R.L Memorial School and College
- Hazi Giyash Uddin Medical College, Madhupur
- Madhupur Assistant Medical Training Centre
- Govt. Sheikh Fazilatunnesa Mujib Mohila College
- Tangail Polytechnic Institute
- Vivekananda College
- B.A.F Shaheen College, Pahar Kanchanpur
- Govt. Saadat College, Karatia
- Bangabandhu Textile Engineering College,(BTEC) Kalihati
- Textile Institute of Tangail.
- Haji Abul Hossain Institute of Technology
- Tangail MATS
- Govt. Nursing & Midwifery College,

== Notable residents ==
- Syed Nawab Ali Chowdhury, zamindar, founding member of University of Dhaka, education minister of United Bengal
- Maulana Abdul Hamid Khan Bhashani, Islamic scholar, political leader, and ex-president of the Awami League.
- Shamsul Huq, the first general secretary of the Awami League.
- Abu Sayeed Chowdhury, the second president of Bangladesh.
- Abdul Mannan, the home and family planning minister (1972–1975), MNA (1970), and MP (1996–2001). He established the Tangail General Hospital, Govt. Sheikh Fazilatunnesa Mujib College, and Atia College.
- Qader "Tiger" Siddiqi, Pakistan Army havildar, famed Mukti Bahini leader (decorated Bir Uttom) (MP 1999–2013), and founding leader of Krishak Sramik Janata League.
- Mohammad Abdur Razzaque, member of parliament from Tangail-1
- Manna, film actor and producer
- Tarana Halim, M.P., film actress

== See also ==
- Ghatail
- Handloom industry in Tangail
