= Greater Dhaka =

Dhaka Metropolitan area

Dhaka Metropolitan area ঢাকা মহানগর এলাকা
- Megalopolis
- Greater Dhaka
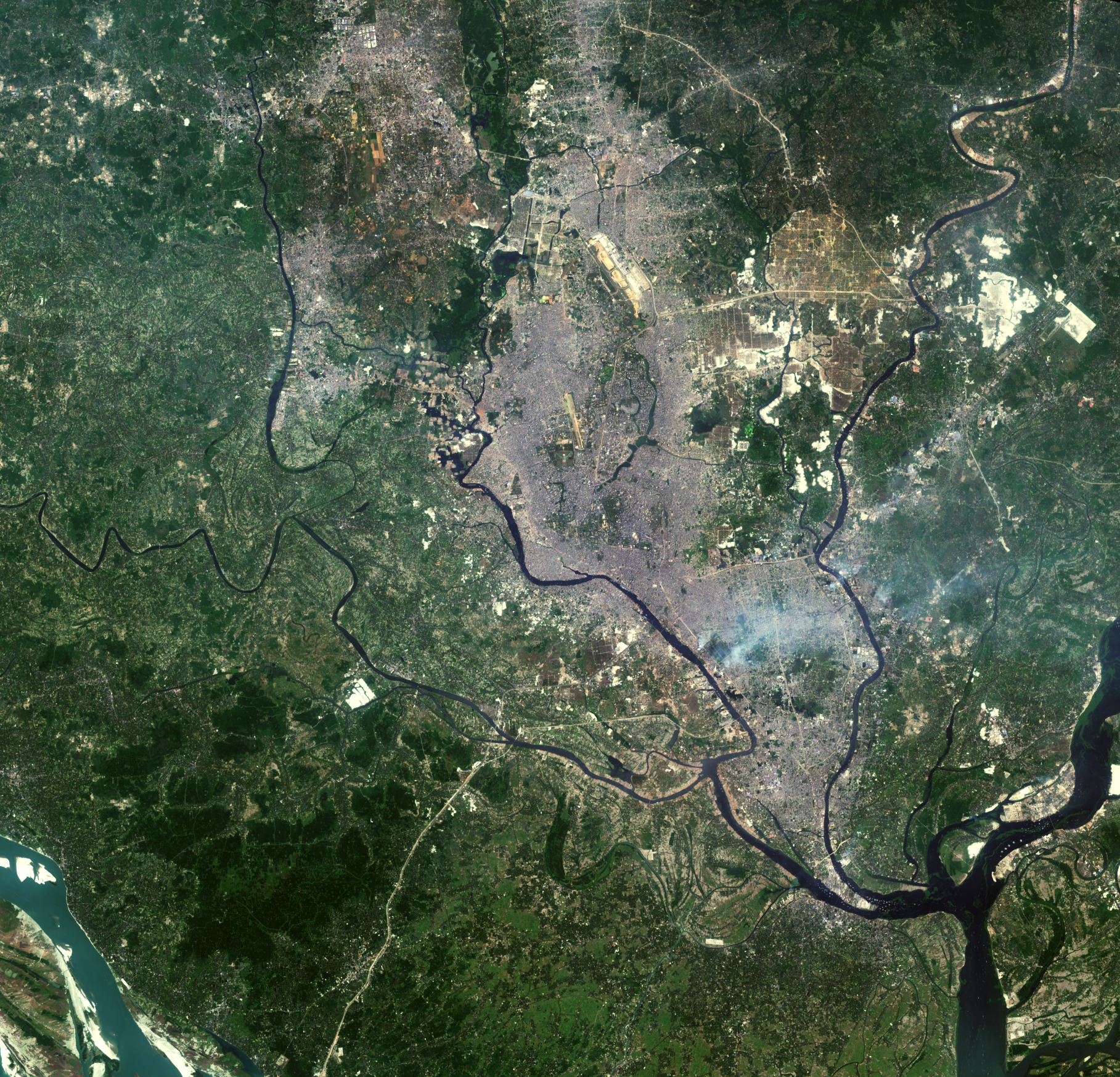
- Satellite image of Greater Dhaka metropolitan region
- Nickname(s): City of Rickshaws, City of Mosques
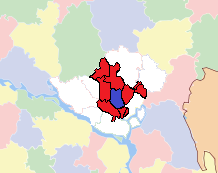
- Dhaka city is shown in blue and other towns and cities are shown in red
- City corporations and municipalities: Dhaka North; Dhaka South; Gazipur; Narayanganj; Savar; Siddhirganj; Keraniganj; Fatullah

Government
  - Body: Government of Bangladesh (de facto)

Area
  - Megalopolis: 2,569.55 km^{2} (992.11 sq mi)
  - Water: 385.35 km^{2} (148.78 sq mi) 15%
  - Metro: 867.49 km^{2} (334.94 sq mi)
- Elevation: 7 m (23 ft)

Population (2024)
  - Megalopolis: 23,981,232

GDP (Nominal, 2023)
  - Megalopolis: US$85.5 billion
  - Per capita: US$3,700

Greater Dhaka (Bengali: বৃহত্তর ঢাকা) is the metropolitan area including and surrounding the Bangladeshi capital city of Dhaka, which has grown into one of the world's largest megacities, and shows a very rapid rate of expansion. Dhaka not only grows because it is the capital and largest urban centre but also due to massive internal displacement from millions of people living in a perennially flood-prone river delta. This urban area now contains the 2nd most populated megacity in the world.

== Definition ==
The area of Dhaka Statistical Metropolitan Area was 1,353 square kilometers, of which Dhaka City Corporation occupied 276 square kilometers at the 2001 census. The Dhaka Statistical Metropolitan Area (SMA) covers the Dhaka Municipal Corporation area and Savar Upazila and Keraniganj Upazila of Dhaka District (note: only a portion of the district is part of the metropolitan area), Narayanganj Sadar Upazila, Bandar Upazila and Rupganj Upazila of Narayanganj District, Gazipur Sadar Upazila and Kaliakair Upazila of Gazipur District. New 2021 estimates for Bangladesh Bureau of Statistics (web) tally just over 24 million for 3 districts in their entirety. (white area in map also includes 6 districts: Manikganj, Munshiganj and Narsindi)

== History ==
Greater Dhaka, encompassing the capital city of Bangladesh and its surrounding metropolitan areas, has a rich and diverse history spanning over a thousand years. From its early settlements to its emergence as the political and economic centre of the nation, Dhaka has played a crucial role in the historical evolution of Bengal.

The history of Dhaka dates back to ancient times, with archaeological evidence suggesting human settlements in the region as early as the 7th century CE. The area was part of various ancient and medieval states, including the Maurya and Gupta Empires, as well as the Pala and Sena dynasties. During this period, Dhaka was known for its strategic location along trade routes, particularly due to its proximity to major rivers.

=== Mughal Period ===
The transformation of Dhaka into a prominent urban centre began during the Mughal era. In 1608, the Mughal Subahdar Islam Khan Chishti declared Dhaka the capital of Bengal Subah, replacing Rajmahal. The city was named Jahangirnagar in honor of Emperor Jahangir. Under Mughal rule, Dhaka flourished as a hub of trade and commerce, particularly in the textile industry. Muslin fabric produced in Dhaka gained international fame, attracting merchants from Europe and the Middle East.

The Mughal rulers constructed several significant architectural structures, including Lalbagh Fort, Chawkbazar Mosque, and Bara Katra, many of which still stand today. The city expanded with the construction of mosques, bridges, caravanserais, and gardens, solidifying its status as a major administrative and economic centre.

=== Colonial Period ===
Following the decline of Mughal rule, Dhaka came under the control of the British East India Company in 1765 and later became part of British India. The city experienced a period of economic stagnation as Kolkata (then Calcutta) emerged as the primary administrative and commercial hub of British Bengal. However, Dhaka remained an important cultural and trade centre, particularly in the jute industry. The establishment of educational institutions, such as Dhaka College (1841) and later the University of Dhaka (1921), contributed to the intellectual and political awakening of the region.

=== Partition and Pakistan Era ===
With the partition of British India in 1947, Dhaka became the capital of East Pakistan, a province of the newly formed Pakistan. This period saw significant infrastructural development, including the establishment of government offices, new industries, and educational institutions. However, tensions between East and West Pakistan grew due to linguistic, economic, and political discrimination, culminating in the Bengali Language Movement of 1952 and the eventual rise of nationalist sentiments.

The city became the epicentre of the Bangladesh Liberation War in 1971. On March 7, 1971, Sheikh Mujibur Rahman delivered his historic speech at the Racecourse Ground (now Suhrawardy Udyan), calling for self-determination. The war officially began with Operation Searchlight on March 25, 1971, when the Pakistan Army launched a brutal crackdown on Dhaka’s population. After nine months of conflict, Dhaka witnessed the surrender of the Pakistan Army on December 16, 1971, marking the independence of Bangladesh.

=== Post-Independence and Modern Era ===
Following independence, Dhaka was declared the capital of Bangladesh. The city saw rapid urbanization and expansion as people from across the country migrated for better opportunities. The development of infrastructure, industries, and transportation networks transformed Dhaka into a major South Asian metropolis. The creation of satellite towns such as Narayanganj, Gazipur, and Savar contributed to the concept of Greater Dhaka, encompassing a wider metropolitan area.

In the late 20th and early 21st centuries, Greater Dhaka witnessed significant economic growth, particularly in the ready-made garment industry, telecommunications, and information technology. However, challenges such as overpopulation, traffic congestion, waterlogging, and environmental degradation have accompanied this growth. Today, Greater Dhaka is one of the world's most densely populated urban regions, serving as the political, economic, and cultural heart of Bangladesh. It is home to key government institutions, multinational corporations, renowned universities, and historical landmarks. Ongoing projects such as the Dhaka Metro Rail, elevated expressways, and urban redevelopment initiatives aim to modernize the city while addressing infrastructural challenges. Despite its complexities, Greater Dhaka continues to be a dynamic and evolving megacity, reflecting the resilience and aspirations of its people.

== Components of the Metropolitan Area ==
Since the 2001 Census, Dhaka has grown tremendously, as evidenced by the 2011 Census figures. However, definitions were changed between the two censuses, with several outlying upazilas situated in neighbouring administrative districts being included in the expanded definition. The following table shows the revision of the metropolitan area, shown in blue and red on map, based on 2011 figures:

Administrative district	Included area	Area (km^{2})	Population (2011)	Population (2022)	Population per km^{2}(2022)
Dhaka District	Dhaka North City Corporation	196.22	6,970,105	5,990,723	30,531
Dhaka District	Dhaka South City Corporation	109.24	6,970,105	4,305,063	39,409
Dhaka District	Dhamrai Upazila	307.41	412,418	517,135	1,682
Dhaka District	Dohar Upazila	161.49	226,439	250,114	1,549
Dhaka District	Keraniganj Upazila	166.87	794,360	1,011,063	6,059
Dhaka District	Nawabganj Upazila	244.80	318,811	348,807	1,425
Dhaka District	Savar Upazila	280.11	1,385,910	2,311,796	8,253
Narayanganj District	Narayanganj Sadar Upazila: Includes Narayanganj City Corporation	100.74	1,323,600	1,979,967	19,654
Narayanganj District	Bandar Upazila: Includes Narayanganj City Corporation	54.39	312,841	414,001	3,765
Narayanganj District	Rupganj Upazila	176.48	534,868	704,828	3,994
Gazipur District	Gazipur Sadar Upazila: Includes Gazipur City Corporation	457.67	1,820,374	3,023,164	6,606
Gazipur District	Kaliakair Upazila	314.13	483,308	694,574	2,211
	Metropolitan Area	2,569.55	14,583,034	21,551,235	8,306
