= 2018 Gazipur City Corporation election =

Mayoral election in Bangladesh

- 27 June 2018
- Registered: 1,137,112 (▲10.73 pp)
- Turnout: 57.05% (▼6.66 pp)
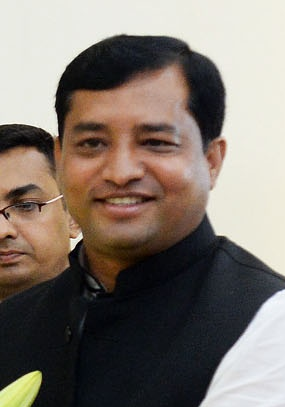
	First party	Second party
Candidate	Zahangir Alam	Hasan Uddin Sarkar
Party	AL	BNP
Popular vote	400,010	197,611
Percentage	63.48%	31.36%
Swing	▲23.99pp	▼24.49pp
Mayor before election
Asadur Rahman Kiron
AL
Elected Mayor
Zahangir Alam
AL
- Council election
- 27 June 2018; 76 seats in the Gazipur City Corporation
Party	Leader	Seats	+/–
AL	Zahangir Alam	48	+4
BNP	Hasan Uddin Sarkar	19	−6
JP(E)	—	2	+1
WPB	—	1	0
Independent	—	6	+1
This lists parties that won seats. See the complete results below.

The 2018 Gazipur City Corporation election was a local government election in the city of Gazipur, Bangladesh, held on 27 June 2018 to elect the Mayor of Gazipur and the Gazipur City Council. The election resulted in a victory for the Awami League candidate Zahangir Alam. In the 76-member City Council, the Awami League won 48 seats, while the Bangladesh Nationalist Party won 19 seats, Jatiya Party (Ershad) won 2 seats, the Workers Party of Bangladesh won 1 seat, and independents won 6 seats. Zahangir Alam became the second mayor of the Gazipur City Corporation following the election.

== Mayoral election results ==
Candidate	Party	Votes	%
Zahangir Alam	Bangladesh Awami League	400,010	63.48
Hasan Uddin Sarkar	Bangladesh Nationalist Party	197,611	31.36
Md. Nasir Uddin	Islami Andolan Bangladesh	26,381	4.19
Md. Jalal Uddin	Bangladesh Islami Front	1,860	0.30
Fazlur Rahman	Islami Oikya Jote	1,659	0.26
Farid Uddin Ahmed	Independent	1,617	0.26
Kazi Md Ruhul Amin	Communist Party of Bangladesh	973	0.15
Total		630,111	100.00
Valid votes		630,111	97.13
Invalid/blank votes		18,603	2.87
Total votes		648,714	100.00
Registered voters/turnout		1,137,112	57.05

== Council election results ==
=== Party-wise ===
2018 GCC council election results (party-wise)
Party	Seats		
Party	Ward Councilors	Reserved Women Councilors	Total Councilors
Bangladesh Awami League	39	9	48
Bangladesh Nationalist Party	12	7	19
Jatiya Party (Ershad)	2	—	2
Workers Party of Bangladesh	—	1	1
Independent	4	2	6
Total	57	19	76
