= Kazi Sayedul Alam Babul =

Bangladeshi politician

- কাজী ছাইয়েদুল আলম বাবুল

Chairman of the Gazipur Development Authority
- Incumbent
- Assumed office 11 November 2026
- Appointed by: Government of Bangladesh

Organising Secretary (Dhaka Division), Bangladesh Nationalist Party

Former General Secretary, Gazipur District unit, Bangladesh Nationalist Party

Personal details
- Born: 7 May 1962 (age 64) Gazipur District, Bangladesh
- Party: Bangladesh Nationalist Party
- Education: Bhawal Badre Alam Government College

Kazi Sayedul Alam Babul (Bengali: কাজী ছাইয়েদুল আলম বাবুল; born 7 May 1962) is a Bangladeshi politician and a member of the central executive committee of the Bangladesh Nationalist Party (BNP), where he serves as organising secretary for Dhaka Division. He previously held senior positions in the party's Gazipur district unit. In November 2026, the government appointed him chairman of the Gazipur Development Authority.

== Early life and education ==
Babul was born on 7 May 1962 in Gazipur District. He is a resident of Kaliakair Upazila. He attended Bhawal Mirzapur H J U High School and later studied at Bhawal Badre Alam Government College.

== Political career ==
Babul began his political career in the BNP in Gazipur. He served as general secretary of the Gazipur district unit of the party, and also as its member secretary. He later became a member of the BNP's central executive committee and organising secretary for Dhaka Division.

On 8 November 2023, on the first day of a 48-hour blockade called by the BNP and Jamaat-e-Islami, police in Gazipur detained Babul and five other BNP members as they attempted to block the Dhaka–Tangail Highway, according to the officer-in-charge of Kaliakair Police Station.

Ahead of the 13th Jatiya Sangsad election, local party activists and residents held a procession and rally in Kaliakair on 10 November 2025, calling on the BNP to nominate Babul for the Gazipur-1 constituency. The party nominated Mojibur Rahman instead, prompting protests by a section of party activists, including Babul's supporters, in Kaliakair, Konabari and Kashimpur.

== Gazipur Development Authority ==
On 11 November 2026, the Ministry of Public Administration issued a notification appointing Babul chairman (Grade-2) of the Gazipur Development Authority on a one-year contract, under section 7(1) of the Gazipur Development Authority Act, 2020. The notification requires him to sever ties with any other profession, business or organisation for the duration of his term.
