= Gazipur City Corporation =

Local governing body of Gazipur, Bangladesh

Coordinates: 23.9073°N 90.3981°E

Gazipur City Corporation গাজীপুর সিটি কর্পোরেশন
- Emblem of the Gazipur City Corporation

Type
- Type: City Corporation

History
- Founded: 16 January 2013; 13 years ago
- New session started: 19 August 2024

Leadership
- Mayor: Vacant since 23 August 2024
- Administrator: Showkat Hossain Sarker since 23 February 2026
- Deputy Mayor: Vacant since 19 August 2024
- Chief Executive Officer: Tanzila Khanam

Structure
- Seats: Vacant seats 76 councillors
- Length of term: Up to five years

Elections
- Voting system: First past the post
- First election: 6 July 2013
- Last election: 25 May 2023
- Next election: TBD

Meeting place
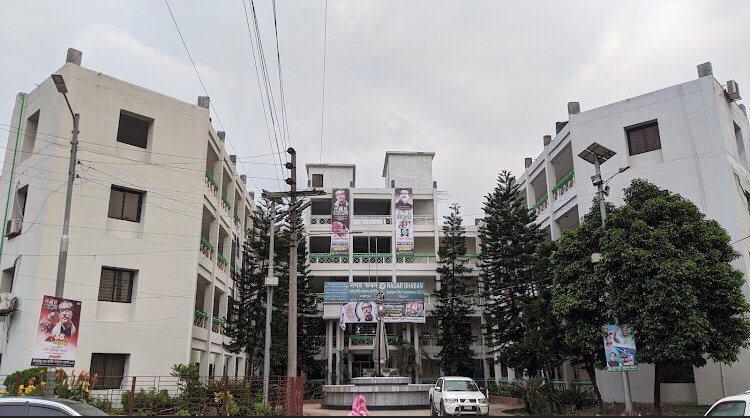
- Nagar Bhaban, Gazipur

Website
- gcc.gov.bd

Gazipur City Corporation mahallah geocode map

Gazipur City Corporation (Bengali: গাজীপুর সিটি কর্পোরেশন, abbreviated as GCC), is a local government authority responsible for administering all civic services in the city of Gazipur, Bangladesh. The GCC administration is elected by popular vote every five years. The corporation is headed by a mayor, who oversees a council consisting of 76 councillors representing different wards of the city. The functions and powers of the GCC are defined under the provisions of The City Corporation act, 2009.

Gazipur City Corporation was established in 2013, it is one of the city corporations of Bangladesh. Gazipur City Corporation's total area is 329.23 square kilometers with approximately has the population of 2,674,697 people in the city corporation area. As of 2018, Gazipur City Corporation had 1.1 million voters.

== History ==
Gazipur City Corporation (GCC) was established on 16 January 2013 when the Government of Bangladesh published a gazette notification upgrading the urban administrative structure of the area into a city corporation. The decision to form the city corporation was approved earlier on 7 January 2013 at a meeting of the National Implementation Committee for Administrative Reforms (NICAR) chaired by the Prime Minister, which endorsed the merger of the former Gazipur Municipality and Tongi Municipality along with adjacent rural areas to create the new city corporation.

Prior to this, Gazipur and Tongi were separately administered as municipalities Gazipur Municipality was established in 1986 and Tongi Municipality in 1974 and the surrounding areas were governed by various local government units. The creation of GCC responded to rapid urbanisation, significant population growth, and the need for strengthened local governance with expanded administrative powers and responsibilities.

Gazipur City Corporation is one of the city corporations of Bangladesh and administers a large metropolitan area covering over 329 square kilometres. Its first mayoral election was held on 6 July 2013 following the city corporation’s establishment.

== Administration ==
The Gazipur City Corporation (GCC) administers the metropolitan area of Gazipur. The city is served by eight metropolitan police stations under Gazipur Metropolitan Police: Bason Thana, Gacha Thana, Joydebpur Thana, Kashimpur Thana, Konabari Thana, Pubail Thana, Tongi East Thana and Tongi West Thana. These police stations are responsible for law enforcement and public safety throughout the city corporation area. The GCC is administratively divided into 57 wards, which are further subdivided into numerous mahallas. The GCC is responsible for municipal governance and civic services, including urban planning, water supply, sanitation, waste management, road maintenance, street lighting, public health, and overall development within its jurisdiction.

== Functions and Services ==
The Gazipur City Corporation (GCC) is responsible for administering the city and ensuring the provision of essential infrastructure and public services. Its functions include urban planning, transport management, healthcare, education, waste management, water supply, and security. Through these services, GCC aims to improve the quality of life for residents and promote sustainable urban development.

Departments of Gazipur City Corporation
#	Departments	Functions / Services
1	Office of the Mayor	Executive administration; city governance; supervision of all GCC services
2	Chief Executive Office	Departmental coordination; service implementation monitoring
3	Administration And Establishment	HR management; staff recruitment; service delivery monitoring
4	Finance and Accounts	Budget preparation; financial planning; payment processing; accounts management; internal audit
5	Engineering	Road-cutting permission; building design approval; contractor registration; land demarcation certificates
6	Urban Planning and Development	Road, drain, bridge, culvert and footpath development; land development; planned residential areas; city beautification
7	Electricity	Installation and maintenance of street lights; lamp-post management; city illumination
8	Transportation and Communication	Urban transport management; traffic & parking control; emergency transport; corpse handling; bus terminal management; road roller & ambulance services
9	Waste Management and Cleaning	Solid waste collection and disposal; street cleaning; drain clearing; mosquito control; landfill management
10	Health	Hospital & clinic management; maternal & child immunization; vitamin A campaigns; midwifery and health technology training
11	Registrar	Birth & death certificates; nationality, inheritance & character certificates
12	Education	Management of schools, madrasas, Sanskrit tolls, kindergartens, technical institutes; adult education; teacher training; cultural & theatre institutes
13	Water Supply and Sewerage	Clean water supply and sewerage management in the entire city corporation.
14	Revenue	Trade license issuance & renewal; holding tax collection; shop/market allotment; lease and asset management
15	Security and Law and Order	City security; joint operations with GMP; CCTV installation and monitoring
16	Magistracy	Arbitration-based case settlement; mobile courts; anti-adulteration drives
17	Housing and Public Works	Distribution and maintenance of residential plots and flats
18	Cultural and Social Development	National Day celebrations; charity programs; and children’s park and playground construction & maintenance
19	Environmental Protection	Pollution control; climate change mitigation; urban greening; tree plantation
20	Religious Welfare	Support for Eid, Puja, and religious events; Qurbani market permissions; land allocation for religious events

== Annual Budget ==
Gazipur City Corporation (GCC) has announced a budget of ৳4009.20 crore (US$330 million) for 2024-25 fiscal year.

== Wards and councillors ==
Gazipur City Corporation is administratively divided into 57 wards. Each ward is represented by one elected councillor, while additional reserved women councillors are elected for groups of wards, as provided under the Local Government (City Corporation) Act.

Ward serial of GCC

=== Councillors of Gazipur City Corporation ===
Ward	Locations Covered	Councillor	Party
Ward-1	Kashimpur area	Vacant	TBD
Ward-2	Kashimpur area	Vacant	TBD
Ward-3	Kashimpur area	Vacant	TBD
Ward-4	Kashimpur area	Vacant	TBD
Ward-5	Kashimpur area	Vacant	TBD
Ward-6	Kashimpur area	Vacant	TBD
Ward-7	Konabari area	Vacant	TBD
Ward-8	Konabari area	Vacant	TBD
Ward-9	Konabari area	Vacant	TBD
Ward-10	Konabari area	Vacant	TBD
Ward-11	Konabari area	Vacant	TBD
Ward-12	Konabari area	Vacant	TBD
Ward-13	Basan area	Vacant	TBD
Ward-14	Basan area	Vacant	TBD
Ward-15	Basan area	Vacant	TBD
Ward-16	Basan area	Vacant	TBD
Ward-17	Basan area	Vacant	TBD
Ward-18	Basan area	Vacant	TBD
Ward-19	Kaulia area	Vacant	TBD
Ward-20	Kaulia area	Vacant	TBD
Ward-21	Kaulia area	Vacant	TBD
Ward-22	Kaulia area	Vacant	TBD
Ward-23	Kaulia area	Vacant	TBD
Ward-24	Gazipur area	Vacant	TBD
Ward-25	Gazipur area	Vacant	TBD
Ward-26	Gazipur area	Vacant	TBD
Ward-27	Gazipur area	Vacant	TBD
Ward-28	Gazipur area	Vacant	TBD
Ward-29	Gazipur area	Vacant	TBD
Ward-30	Gazipur area	Vacant	TBD
Ward-31	Gazipur area	Vacant	TBD
Ward-32	Gachha area	Vacant	TBD
Ward-33	Gachha area	Vacant	TBD
Ward-34	Gachha area	Vacant	TBD
Ward-35	Gachha area	Vacant	TBD
Ward-36	Gachha area	Vacant	TBD
Ward-37	Gachha area	Vacant	TBD
Ward-38	Gachha area	Vacant	TBD
Ward-39	Pubail area	Vacant	TBD
Ward-40	Pubail area	Vacant	TBD
Ward-41	Pubail area	Vacant	TBD
Ward-42	Pubail area	Vacant	TBD
Ward-43	Tongi area	Vacant	TBD
Ward-44	Tongi area	Vacant	TBD
Ward-45	Tongi area	Vacant	TBD
Ward-46	Tongi area	Vacant	TBD
Ward-47	Tongi area	Vacant	TBD
Ward-48	Tongi area	Vacant	TBD
Ward-49	Tongi area	Vacant	TBD
Ward-50	Tongi area	Vacant	TBD
Ward-51	Tongi area	Vacant	TBD
Ward-52	Tongi area	Vacant	TBD
Ward-53	Tongi area	Vacant	TBD
Ward-54	Tongi area	Vacant	TBD
Ward-55	Tongi area	Vacant	TBD
Ward-56	Tongi area	Vacant	TBD
Ward-57	Tongi area	Vacant	TBD
	Reserved women's seats		
58	Women's seat-1	Vacant	TBD
59	Women's seat-2	Vacant	TBD
60	Women's seat-3	Vacant	TBD
61	Women's seat-4	Vacant	TBD
62	Women's seat-5	Vacant	TBD
63	Women's seat-6	Vacant	TBD
64	Women's seat-7	Vacant	TBD
65	Women's seat-8	Vacant	TBD
66	Women's seat-9	Vacant	TBD
67	Women's seat-10	Vacant	TBD
68	Women's seat-11	Vacant	TBD
69	Women's seat-12	Vacant	TBD
70	Women's seat-13	Vacant	TBD
71	Women's seat-14	Vacant	TBD
72	Women's seat-15	Vacant	TBD
73	Women's seat-16	Vacant	TBD
74	Women's seat-17	Vacant	TBD
75	Women's seat-18	Vacant	TBD
76	Women's seat-19	Vacant	TBD

== List of mayors ==
Status

Acting Mayor or Administrator

No.	Portrait	Officeholder (birth–death)	Election	Term of office			Designation	Political party	Reference
No.	Portrait	Officeholder (birth–death)	Election	From	To	Period	Designation	Political party	Reference
1		M. A. Mannan (1950–2022)	2013	6 July 2013	11 February 2015	1 year, 220 days	Mayor	Bangladesh Nationalist Party	
–		Asadur Rahman Kiron	–	1 March 2015	1 June 2017	2 years, 92 days	Acting Mayor	Bangladesh Awami League	
1		M. A. Mannan (1950–2022)	–	1 June 2017	6 July 2017	35 days	Mayor	Bangladesh Nationalist Party	
–		Asadur Rahman Kiron	–	7 July 2017	17 July 2018	1 year, 10 days	Acting Mayor	Bangladesh Awami League	
2		Zahangir Alam	2018	27 July 2018	25 November 2021	3 years, 121 days	Mayor	Bangladesh Awami League	
–		Asadur Rahman Kiron	–	26 November 2021	25 May 2023	1 year, 180 days	Acting Mayor	Bangladesh Awami League	
3		Jayeda Khatun	2023	26 May 2023	19 August 2024	1 year, 85 days	Mayor	Independent	
–		Md. Sabirul Islam	–	-	19 August 2024	11 ‍September 2024	23 days	Administrator	Independent
–		Sharaf Uddin Ahmed Chowdhury	–	31 October 2024	23 February 2026	1 year, 115 days	Administrator	Independent	-
–		Showkat Hossain Sarker	–	23 February 2026	Incumbent	177 days	Administrator	Bangladesh Nationalist Party	-

== Past Elections ==
=== Election Result 2023 ===
Gazipur Mayoral Election 2023
Party	Candidate	Votes	%	±%
Independent	Jayeda Khatun	238,934	43.63	+43.38
AL	Azmat Ullah Khan	222,736	40.69	−20.95
IAB	Gazi Ataur Rahman	45,352	8.28	+4.22
Gano Front	Atiqul Islam	16,974	3.10	+3.10
JP(E)	MM Niaz Uddin	16,382	2.99	+2.99
Zaker Party	Raju Ahmed	7,206	1.32	+1.32
Majority		16,198	2.96	−29.17
Turnout		573,275	48.6	▼4.3pp
Registered electors		1,179,486		
Independent gain from AL				

=== Election Result 2018 ===
Gazipur Mayoral Election 2018
Party	Candidate	Votes	%	±%
AL	Zahangir Alam	400,010	61.64%	+22.05
BNP	Hasan Uddin Sarkar	197,611	30.46%	−25.41
IAB	Md. Nasir Uddin	26,381	4.06%	+4.06
BIF	Md. Jalal Uddin	1,860	0.29%	+0.29
IOJ	Fazlur Rahman	1,659	0.26%	+0.26
Independent	Farid Uddin Ahmed	1,617	0.25%	+0.25
CPB	Kazi Md Ruhul Amin	973	0.15%	+0.15
Majority		202,399	33.6%	+17.3
Turnout		648,714	52.9%	▼10.8pp
Registered electors		1,137,112		
AL hold				

=== Election Result 2013 ===
Gazipur Mayoral Election 2013
Party	Candidate	Votes	%	±%
BNP	M. A. Mannan	365,444	55.87%	New
AL	Azmat Ullah Khan	258,867	39.59%	New
Majority		106,577	16.28%	New
Turnout		654,311	63.7%	New
Registered electors		1,026,938		
BNP win (new seat)				

== Important establishments ==
1. Islamic University of Technology (IUT)
2. Bangabandhu Sheikh Mujibur Rahman Agricultural University (BSMRAU)
3. Bangladesh Rice Research Institute (BRRI)
4. Bangladesh Agricultural Research Institute (BARI)
5. Dhaka University of Engineering and Technology (DUET)
6. Rani Bilashmoni Govt. Boys' High School
7. Seed Certification Agency (SCA)
8. National Agricultural Training Academy (NATA)
9. Agricultural Training Institute (ATI)
10. Shahid Tazuddin Ahmed Medical College
11. Joydebpur Govt. Girls' High School
12. Bhawal Badre Alam Govt. University College
13. National University
14. Bangladesh Open University
15. Bangladesh Machine Tools Factory Ltd. (BMTF)
16. Security Printing Press Ltd.
17. Bangladesh Ordinance Factory (BOF)
18. Bangladesh Diesel Plant Ltd.
19. Ansar Academy
20. Bangabandhu Safari Park
21. Hi-tech Park
