= 2013 Gazipur City Corporation election =

Mayoral election in Bangladesh

- 6 July 2013
- Registered: 1,026,938
- Turnout: 63.71%
	First party	Second party
Candidate	M. A. Mannan	Azmat Ullah Khan
Party	BNP	AL
Popular vote	365,444	258,867
Percentage	55.85%	39.49%
Mayor before election
New post
Elected Mayor
M. A. Mannan
BNP
- Council election
- 6 July 2013; 76 seats in the Gazipur City Corporation
Party	Leader	Seats	+/–
AL	Azmat Ullah Khan	44	+44
BNP	M. A. Mannan	25	+25
JP(E)	Didn’t participate	1	+1
WPB	Didn’t participate	1	+1
Independent	—	5	+5
This lists parties that won seats. See the complete results below.

The 2013 Gazipur City Corporation election was a local government election in the city of Gazipur, Bangladesh, held on 6 July 2013 to elect the Mayor of Gazipur and the Gazipur City Council. The election resulted in a victory for the Bangladesh Nationalist Party candidate M. A. Mannan. In the 76-member City Council, the Awami League won 44 seats, while the Bangladesh Nationalist Party won 25 seats, Jatiya Party (Ershad) won 1 seats, the Workers Party of Bangladesh won 1 seat, and independents won 5 seats. M. A. Mannan became the first mayor of the Gazipur following the election.

== Results ==
Gazipur Mayoral Election 2013
Party	Candidate	Votes	%	±%
BNP	M. A. Mannan	365,444	55.9	New
AL	Azmat Ullah Khan	258,867	39.6	New
Majority		106,577	16.3	New
Turnout		654,311	63.7	New
Registered electors		1,026,938		
BNP win (new seat)				
