= Safiuddin Sarker Academy and College =

- সফিউদ্দিন সরকার একাডেমি এন্ড কলেজ
- Logo of Safiuddin Sarker Academy & College

Location
- College Gate, Tongi, Gazipur; 1711; Bangladesh; 23.9097°N 90.3965°E

Information
- Other name: SSAC
- Former name: Tongi Pauro Kindergarten
- Type: Primary school; Secondary school; Higher secondary school
- Motto: Bengali: সুপ্ত মেধার সুষ্ঠু বিকাশ (Proper development of latent talent)
- Established: 1978; 48 years ago
- Founder: Hasan Uddin Sarker
- School board: Dhaka Education Board
- Principal: Md. Moniruzzaman (2017; 9 years ago - present)
- Assistant Headmaster(s): MD Abdul Matin (Morning Shift) (acting); MD Abul Kasem (Day Shift)
- Staff: 207
- Faculty: n/a
- Teaching staff: 170
- Grades: 1 to 12
- Enrollment: 8,000
- Language: Bangla
- Campus type: Urban
- Colors: White, navy blue and golden yellow epaulette for school section, Day Shift White, black and green epaulette for college section, day shift White and green for school & college section, morning shift
- Demonym: SSACians
- Website: ssaac.edu.bd

Safiuddin Sarker Academy and College (Bengali: সফিউদ্দিন সরকার একাডেমি এন্ড কলেজ), also known as SSAC, is an educational institution with two shifts, located at Tongi, Gazipur Sadar Upazila, Gazipur District, Bangladesh. The schools under the institution offer five years primary education, five years high school education and two years education for tertiary level. The language of instruction is Bengali. In 2016, about 8,000 students are enrolled. There are about 170 teaching staffs including assistant professors to junior teachers.

== History ==
The school, founded by former member of parliament Hasan Uddin Sarkar, began as "Tongi Pauro Kindergarten" in 1978. In 1984, it was accredited by the Dhaka Education Board as a secondary school serving students through class 10. The first batch of students from the school sat their Secondary School Certificate (SSC) examinations in 1986. In 1994, the school opened a college section.

== Campus ==
SSAC is located on the west side of the Dhaka–Mymensingh Highway, in Tongi, Gazipur Sadar Upazila, Gazipur District.

== Curriculum ==
The national curriculum provided by NCTB is followed for all the existing classes and exams under the Dhaka Education Board. Bangla and English are compulsory for all the faculties. This curriculum includes lower secondary, secondary and higher secondary school academic subjects. Following the government rules, ICT education has been obligatory for the students of secondary and higher secondary classes. They can choose one of the three major groups: Arts/Humanities, Business Studies, and Science.

== Awards and recognition ==
It has already been a tradition that every year SSAC secures the topmost positions in Primary Education Certificate (PEC) Exam, Junior School Certificate (JSC) Exam and Secondary School Certificate (SSC) Exam since last 10 years in Gazipur District. It was also recognised as one of the top 10 educational institutions under Dhaka Education Board in 2005–2006, 2006–2007 academic year. In 2011, SSAC was ranked 20th in performance among schools under Dhaka Education Board.

== Photography Club of SSAC ==
Safiuddin Sarker Academy & College has a Photography Club named Safiuddin Sarker Academy Photography Club - SSAPC. They started their journey on 14 July 2017 for the purpose of capturing memorable events of Safiuddin Sarker Academy & College, Tongi, Gazipur District. They want to represent their school & college around the country.

== Scout Group of SSAC ==
Safiuddin Sarker Academy & College has a Scout Group named Safiuddin Sarker Academy & College Scout Group - SSACSG. They started on 20 June 1994. Its controlled by National Scouts Organization, Bangladesh They want to represent their school & college around the country.

== Information Technology Club of SSAC ==
Safiuddin Sarker Academy & College has an IT Club named Safiuddin Sarker Academy & College Information Technology Club - SSACITC

== Principals of SSAC ==
=== Hafiz Uddin Talukder (1978–2015) ===
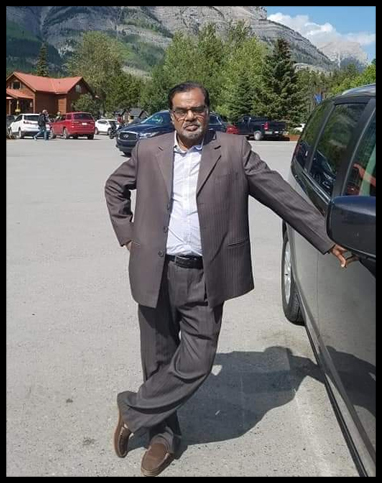
Md. Hafiz Uddin Talukder

Hafiz Uddin Talukder Sir is the first principal of Safiuddin Sarkar Academy & College. He played a role in starting the college branch of Safiuddin Academy.

== Gallery ==
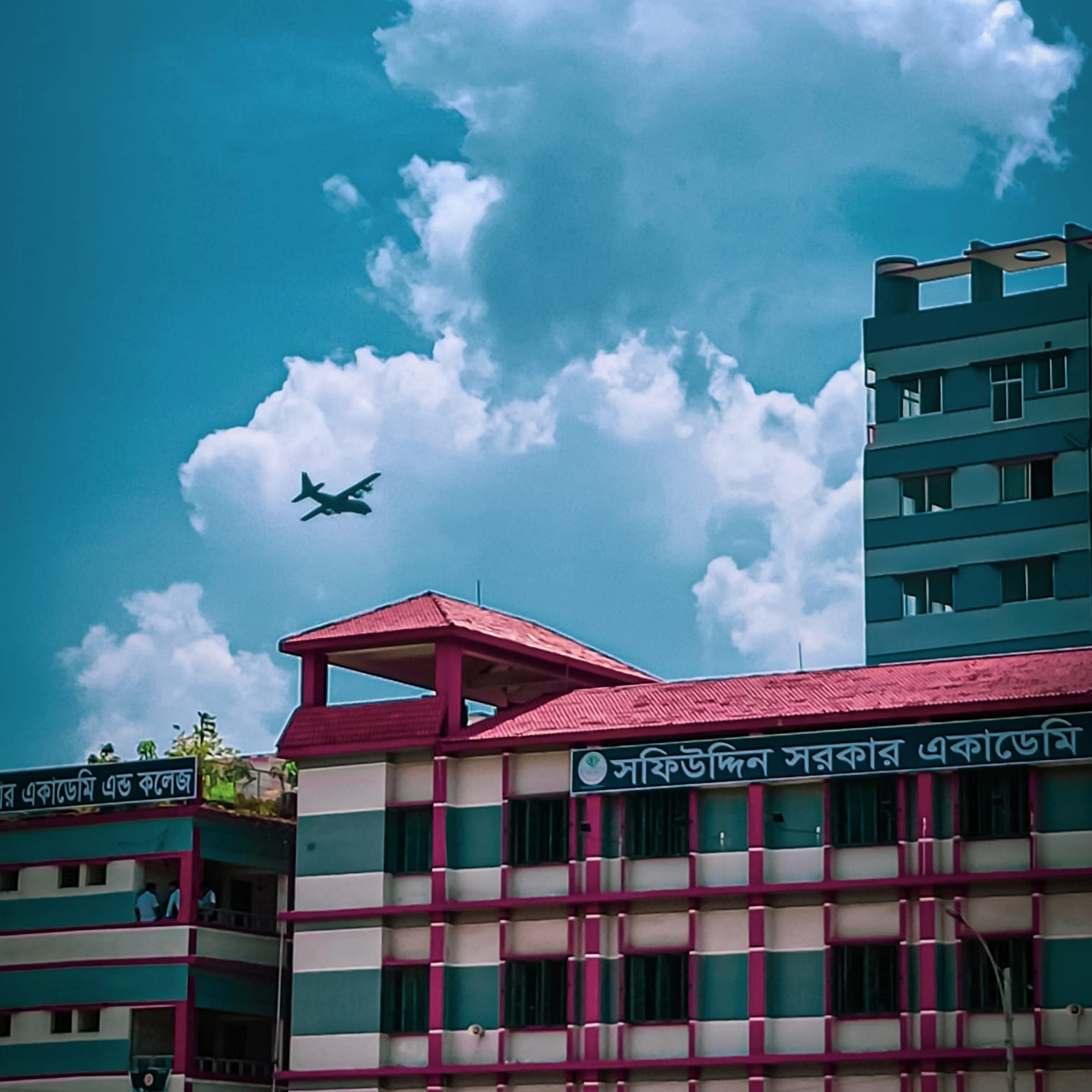
SSAC Sky

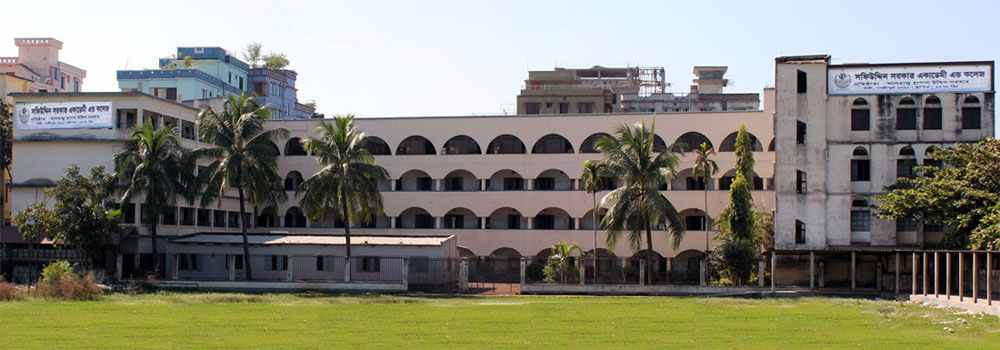
Safiuddin Sarker Academy and College

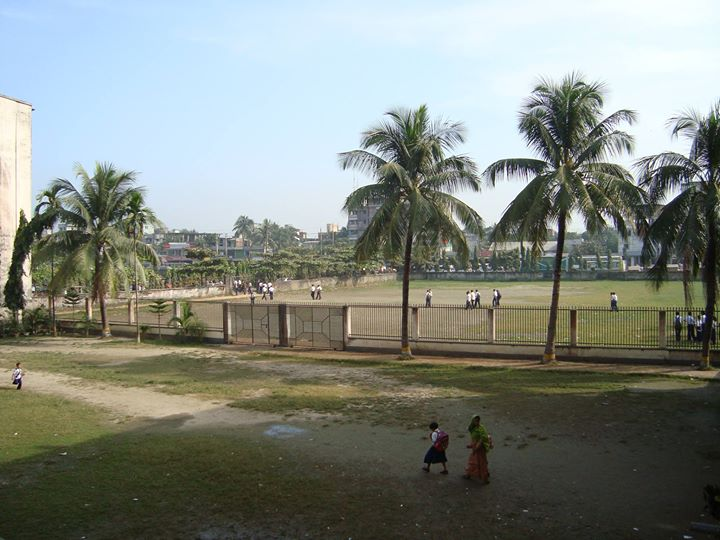
Safiuddin Sarker Academy and College infornt

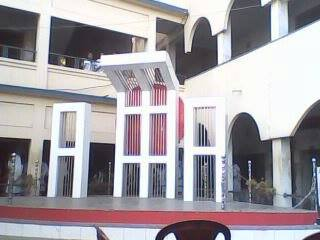
'Safiuddin Sarker Academy and Colleges shohid miner'
