= 2023 Gazipur City Corporation election =

Mayor and council election in Bangladesh

- 25 May 2023
- Registered: 1,179,486 (▲3.73 pp)
- Turnout: 48.75% (▼8.3 pp)
	First party	Second party
Candidate	Jayeda Khatun	Azmat Ullah Khan
Party	Independent	AL
Popular vote	238,934	222,736
Percentage	41.68%	38.85%
Swing	New	▼24.63pp
Mayor before election
Asadur Rahman Kiron
AL
Elected Mayor
Jayeda Khatun
Independent
- Council election
- 25 May 2023; 76 seats in the Gazipur City Corporation
Party	Leader	Seats	+/–
AL	Azmat Ullah Khan	61	+13
BNP	Didn't contest	15	−4
JP(E)	Niaz Uddin	0	−2
WPB	—	0	−1
Independent	—	0	−6
This lists parties that won seats. See the complete results below.

The 2023 Gazipur City Corporation election was a local government election in the city of Gazipur, Bangladesh, held on 25 May 2023 to elect the Mayor of Gazipur and the Gazipur City Council. A total of eight candidates participated in the election. The election resulted in a victory for independent candidate Jayeda Khatun. In the 76-member City Council, the Awami League won 61 seats, while the Bangladesh Nationalist Party won 15 seats.

== Candidates ==
=== Mayoral election ===
Candidate	Election symbol	Party	Ref.
Azmat Ullah Khan	Nouka (Boat)	Awami League	
Gazi Ataur Rahman	Hatpakha (Hand fan)	Islami Andolon Bangladesh	
MM Niaz Uddin	Langol (Plough)	Jatiya Party (Ershad)	
Atiqul Islam	Machh (Fish)	Gano Front	
Raju Ahmed	Golap ful (Rose)	Zaker Party	
Jayeda Khatun	Tebil ghori (Table clock)	Independent	
Sarkar Shah Nur Islam	Hati (Elephant)	Independent	
Harun-or-Rashid	Ghora (Horse)	Independent	

== Schedule ==
Election schedule
- 3 April: Date of notification
- 27 April: Deadline for filling nomination
- 30 April: Scrutiny
- 2–4 May: Period of appeal against scrutiny
- 5–7 May: Appeal resolve
- 8 May: Withdrawal deadline
- 9 May: Symbol distribution
- 9–23 May: Period of official campaign
- 25 May: Election & counting

== Mayoral election results ==
Jayeda Khatun was elected as mayor of the Gazipur City Corporation by defeating Awami League candidate Azmat Ullah Khan.

Candidate	Party	Votes	%
Jayeda Khatun	Independent	238,934	41.68
Azmat Ullah Khan	Bangladesh Awami League	222,736	38.85
Gazi Ataur Rahman	Islami Andolan Bangladesh	45,352	7.91
Sarkar Shah Nur Islam	Independent	23,265	4.06
Atiqul Islam	Gano Front	16,974	2.96
MM Niaz Uddin	Jatiya Party (Ershad)	16,382	2.86
Raju Ahmed	Zaker Party	7,206	1.26
Harun-or-Rashid	Independent	2,426	0.42
Total		573,275	100.00
Valid votes		573,275	99.69
Invalid/blank votes		1,775	0.31
Total votes		575,050	100.00
Registered voters/turnout		1,179,486	48.75

== Council election results ==
=== Party-wise ===
2023 GCC council election results (party-wise)
Party	Seats		
Party	Ward Councilors	Reserved Women Councilors	Total Councilors
Bangladesh Awami League	44	17	61
Bangladesh Nationalist Party	13	2	15
Total	57	19	76

== See also ==
- 2023 elections in Bangladesh
