= Mayor of Gazipur =

- Incumbent; Showkat Hossain Sarker (Administrator) since 23 February 2026
- Gazipur City Corporation
- Style: Honourable (formal)
- Type: Council Leader
- Member of: Gazipur City Corporation
- Seat: Nagar Bhaban, Gazipur
- Appointer: Electorate of Gazipur
- Term length: Five years, renewable
- Constituting instrument: The City Corporation act, 2009
- Inaugural holder: M. A. Mannan
- Formation: 16 January 2013; 13 years ago
- Salary: ৳150000 (US$1,200) per month (incl. allowances)
- Website: www.gcc.gov.bd

The Mayor of Gazipur is the chief elected executive of the Gazipur City Corporation. The Mayor's office oversees civic services, manages public properties, and coordinates the functions of various government agencies within the city. In addition, the Mayor is responsible for enforcing city corporation regulations and state laws, thereby ensuring good governance and the sustainable development of Gazipur.

The mayor's office is located in Nagar Bhaban; it has jurisdiction over all 57 wards of Gazipur City.

== List of officeholders ==
Political parties

- Bangladesh Awami League
- Bangladesh Nationalist Party
- Independent (politician)

Status

Acting Mayor or Administrator

No.	Portrait	Officeholder (birth–death)	Election	Term of office			Designation	Political party	Reference
No.	Portrait	Officeholder (birth–death)	Election	From	To	Period	Designation	Political party	Reference
1		M. A. Mannan (1950–2022)	2013	6 July 2013	11 February 2015	1 year, 220 days	Mayor	Bangladesh Nationalist Party	
–		Asadur Rahman Kiron	–	1 March 2015	1 June 2017	2 years, 92 days	Acting Mayor	Bangladesh Awami League	
1		M. A. Mannan (1950–2022)	–	1 June 2017	6 July 2017	35 days	Mayor	Bangladesh Nationalist Party	
–		Asadur Rahman Kiron	–	7 July 2017	17 July 2018	1 year, 10 days	Acting Mayor	Bangladesh Awami League	
2		Zahangir Alam	2018	27 July 2018	25 November 2021	3 years, 121 days	Mayor	Bangladesh Awami League	
–		Asadur Rahman Kiron	–	26 November 2021	25 May 2023	1 year, 180 days	Acting Mayor	Bangladesh Awami League	
3		Jayeda Khatun	2023	26 May 2023	19 August 2024	1 year, 85 days	Mayor	Independent	
–		Md. Sabirul Islam	–	19 August 2024	11 ‍September 2024	23 days	Administrator	Independent	-
–		Sharaf Uddin Ahmed Chowdhury	–	31 October 2024	23 February 2026	1 year, 115 days	Administrator	Independent	-
–		Showkat Hossain Sarker	–	23 February 2026	Incumbent	196 days	Administrator	Bangladesh Nationalist Party	-

== Elections ==
=== Election Result 2023 ===
Gazipur Mayoral Election 2023
Party	Candidate	Votes	%	±%
Independent	Jayeda Khatun	238,934	43.63%	+43.38
AL	Azmat Ullah Khan	222,736	40.69%	−20.95
IAB	Gazi Ataur Rahman	45,352	8.28%	+4.22
Gano Front	Atiqul Islam	16,974	3.10%	+3.10
JP(E)	MM Niaz Uddin	16,382	2.99%	+2.99
Zaker Party	Raju Ahmed	7,206	1.32%	+1.32
Majority		16,198	2.96%	−29.17
Turnout		573,275	48.6%	▼4.3pp
Registered electors		1,179,486		
Independent gain from AL				

=== Election Result 2018 ===
Gazipur Mayoral Election 2018
Party	Candidate	Votes	%	±%
AL	Zahangir Alam	400,010	61.64%	+22.05
BNP	Hasan Uddin Sarkar	197,611	30.46%	−25.41
IAB	Md. Nasir Uddin	26,381	4.06%	+4.06
BIF	Md. Jalal Uddin	1,860	0.29%	+0.29
IOJ	Fazlur Rahman	1,659	0.26%	+0.26
Independent	Farid Uddin Ahmed	1,617	0.25%	+0.25
CPB	Kazi Md Ruhul Amin	973	0.15%	+0.15
Majority		202,399	33.6%	+17.3
Turnout		648,714	52.9%	▼10.8pp
Registered electors		1,137,112		
AL hold				

=== Election Result 2013 ===
Gazipur Mayoral Election 2013
Party	Candidate	Votes	%	±%
BNP	M. A. Mannan	365,444	55.87%	New
AL	Azmat Ullah Khan	258,867	39.59%	New
Majority		106,577	16.28%	New
Turnout		654,311	63.7%	New
Registered electors		1,026,938		
BNP win (new seat)				
