= Showkat Hossain Sarker =

The Honorable Administrator Showkat Hossain Sarker
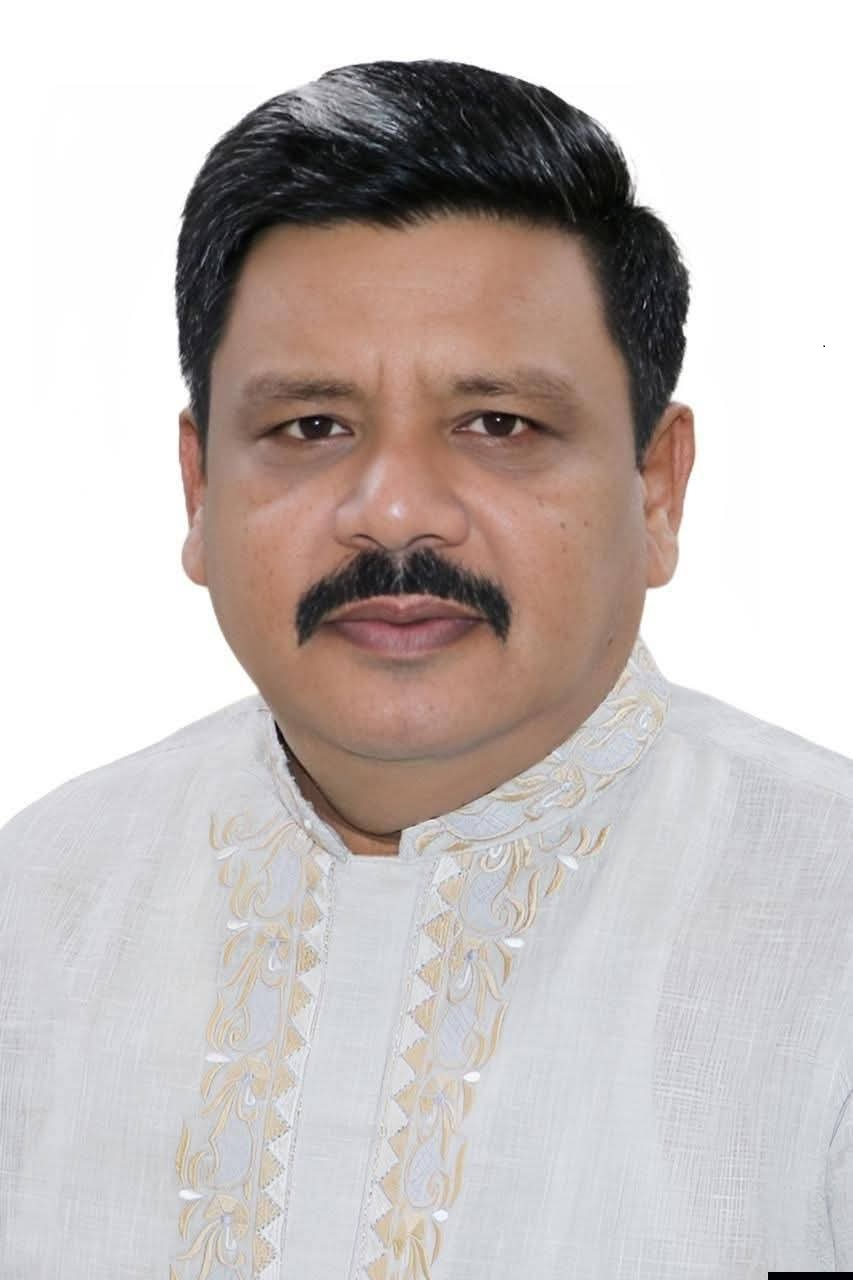

Gazipur City Corporation
- Incumbent
- Assumed office 23 February 2026
- Prime Minister: Tarique Rahman
- Preceded by: Sharaf Uddin Ahmed Chowdhury

President, Gazipur Metropolitan BNP
- Incumbent
- Assumed office 2020

Personal details
- Born: 1 May 1968 (age 58) Gazipur Sadar, Gazipur
- Party: Bangladesh Nationalist Party
- Occupation: Business and politics

Shawkat Hossain Sarkar is a Bangladeshi politician. He is currently serving as the Administrator of Gazipur City Corporation. Before entering politics, he served as the elected Chairman of Kashimpur Union Parishad for about 10 years. He is currently serving as the President of Bangladesh Nationalist Party (BNP) Gazipur Metropolitan.

== Early life and education ==
Shawkat Hossain Sarkar was born in Gazipur Sadar. He served as the elected chairman of Kashimpur Union Parishad for about 10 years. His father Giasuddin Sarkar served as the chairman for about 10 years. Before that, his grandfather Javed Ali Sarkar and uncle Sohrab Uddin Sarkar were also chairman for 10 years at separate times. Each of them served a ten-year term after being elected once.

== Political career ==
He is a businessman by profession and has been involved in political activities along with business for a long time. He is serving as the president of the Gazipur Metropolitan City of the Bangladesh Nationalist Party (BNP). Earlier, he served as the Organizing Secretary of the Gazipur Metropolitan City BNP.

== Social service and contribution ==
He is known as a charitable and environmentalist leader in the area. He has spoken out for environmentally friendly industrialization in the constituency and is regularly active in public relations and social activities.

== 'Extortion' video controversy ==
A video of him went viral on social media in late 2025, which generated mixed reactions at the local level. Although the opposition promoted it as an extortion video, Shawkat Hossain Sarkar claimed that it was a legitimate transaction of selling an old car. He also filed a defamation case in the Gazipur court over this incident.

== Allegations of land grabbing and house vandalism ==
He is accused of breaking and looting his ancestral house late at night, which was reported in the media. He is accused of breaking and looting the house of Sheikh Shahidul Islam Swapan, a member of the Metro Thana Sechchhasebak Dal in Kashimpur. To hide this fact, he has filed a defamation case of Tk 50 crore (Case No. GR 480/25) in the court, calling it propaganda. He also claims that the opponent is trying to humiliate him politically and personally, focusing on the upcoming elections..
