= Muhammad Mahbub Ul Islam =

Bangladeshi judge

Justice of the High Court Division of Bangladesh

Personal details
- Born: December 2, 1958 (age 67)
- Profession: Judge

Muhammad Mahbub Ul Islam is a Justice of the High Court Division of the Bangladesh Supreme Court.

== Early life ==
Mahbub was born on 2 December 1958. He has a LLB and LLM from the University of Dhaka. Mahbub fled to India and later fought against Pakistan during the Bangladesh Liberation War.

== Career ==
Mahbub became a lawyer of the District Courts in 1982. He joined the judicial branch of the Bangladesh Civil Service on 22 February 1984 and was appointed Munsif.

In May 2003, Mahbub, then judge of the 5th Additional District and Sessions Court in Dhaka, sentenced three to seven years imprisonment for filing a false case under the Acid Control Act and ordered an investigation against the police officer who investigated the case.

On 4 March 2009, Mahbub was promoted to District and Sessions Judge. He reads poem on Bangladesh Betar.

In October 2010, Mahbub, as judge of the Sylhet Divisional Speedy Trial Tribunal, ordered investigation into the 2004 grenade attack on a rally of Awami League politician, Suranjit Sengupta. The main accused in the case was Harkat-ul-Jihad al-Islami Bangladesh chief Mufti Abdul Hannan.

In January 2011, Mahbub was transferred from the Sylhet Divisional Speedy Trial Tribunal, and made judge of Panchagarh District and Sessions Judge.

On 21 October 2019, Mahbub was appointed an additional judge of the High Court Division by President Mohammad Abdul Hamid.

In August 2020, Mahbub and Justice Krishna Debnath commuted the death sentences of two convicted for killing a schoolboy in Gazipur in 2017 to life sentences.

In September 2021, Mahbub and Justice KM Kamrul Kader ordered the removal of all structures, except a mosque, from Jhenaidah municipality public park.

In April 2023, Mahbub and Justice Farah Mahbub ordered the withdrawal of Rapid Action Battalion officers who were involved in the arrest and custodial death of Sultana Jasmine, an employee of Chandipur union land office. They also ordered an investigation by senior officials into the custodial death. In May, Mahbub and Justice Farah Mahbub, sought information on a plan by Bangladesh Water Development Board to narrow Jamuna River following a petition by Human Rights and Peace for Bangladesh. The Board responded to the bench by saying they do not have any plans to narrow Jamuna River. Mahbub and Justice Farah Mahbub asked the government to explain why its failure to provide rights to Hindu women under the family laws should not be declared illegal. Mahbub and Justice Farah Mahbub rejected a petition by Zahangir Alam, former Mayor of Gazipur, challenging the Bangladesh Election Commission dismissing his candidacy in the Gazipur mayoral election based on him being involved with a defaulted loan. Mahbub and Justice Farah Mahbub asked the government to create a list of individuals and entities involved with encroaching on Labundha River in Gazipur District in August.
