= List of cities of Bangladesh by population =

Cities of Bangladesh by population

According to Bangladesh Bureau of Statistics, urban areas with population more than 100,000 is termed as City.

According to 2022 Bangladeshi census, there are 46 cities in Bangladesh. They are administered by City Corporation or municipal corporations.

== List ==
City	Population (2022)	Area	District	Division
Dhaka	10,295,786	305.46	Dhaka	Dhaka
Chittagong	3,230,507	155.4	Chittagong	Chittagong
Gazipur	2,677,715	329.53	Gazipur	Dhaka
Narayanganj	967,951	72.43	Narayanganj	Dhaka
Khulna	719,557	45.65	Khulna	Khulna
Rangpur	708,570	205.7	Rangpur	Rangpur
Mymensingh	577,000	91.315	Mymensingh	Mymensingh
Rajshahi	553,288	96.72	Rajshahi	Rajshahi
Sylhet	532,839	160.62	Sylhet	Sylhet
Bogura	486,016	69.56	Bogura	Rajshahi
Cumilla	440,233	53.04	Cumilla	Chittagong
Barishal	419,484	58	Barishal	Barishal
Savar	384,105	14.08	Dhaka	Dhaka
Brahmanbaria	264,341	18.5	Brahmanbaria	Chittagong
Sreepur	258.973	46.97	Gazipur	Dhaka
Kaliakair	249,111	24.66	Gazipur	Dhaka
Faridpur	237,266	22.39	Faridpur	Dhaka
Feni	234,356	27.2	Feni	Chittagong
Kushtia	221,806	42.79	Kushtia	Khulna
Tangail	212,887	29.43	Tangail	Dhaka
Dinajpur	212,288	24.5	Dinajpur	Rangpur
Jessore	209,352	14.72	Jessore	Khulna
Chandpur	203,451	26.82	Chandpur	Chittagong
Chapainawabganj	201,005	24.6	Chapainawabganj	Rajshahi
Tarabo	197,672	24.6	Narayanganj	Dhaka
Cox's Bazar	196,385	32.9	Cox's Bazar	Chittagong
Sirajganj	188,549	28.49	Sirajganj	Rajshahi
Narsingdi	180,711	20.95	Narsingdi	Dhaka
Naogaon	178,649	24.58	Naogaon	Rajshahi
Pabna	176,005	27.2	Pabna	Rajshahi
Jamalpur	158,889	53.28	Jamalpur	Mymensingh
Bhairab	156,297	13.07	Kishoreganj	Dhaka
Saidpur	143,538	34.82	Nilphamari	Rangpur
Jhenaidah	140,271	32.42	Jhenaidah	Khulna
Satkhira	138,411	31.1	Satkhira	Khulna
Kishoreganj	138,063	28.29	Kishoreganj	Dhaka
Lakshmipur	132,230	27	Lakshmipur	Chittagong
Maijdee Court	132,198	23.79	Noakhali	Chittagong
Sherpur	123,516	26.76	Sherpur	Mymensingh
Netrokona	122,299	21.02	Netrokona	Mymensingh
Magura	114,249	44.36	Magura	Khulna
Gopalganj	108,523	13.82	Gopalganj	Dhaka
Rangamati	106,069	64.75	Rangamati	Chittagong
Ghorashal	101,690	27.5	Narsingdi	Dhaka
Thakurgaon	100,462	30	Thakurgaon	Rangpur
Chowmuhani	100,065	20.7	Noakhali	Chittagong
