= Zahangir Alam =

Bangladeshi politician

Md. Zahangir Alam
- মোঃ জাহাঙ্গীর আলম
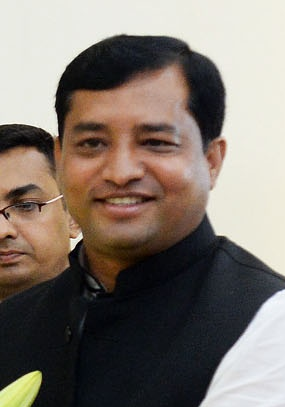
- Alam in 2018

2nd Mayor of Gazipur
- In office 27 July 2018 – 25 November 2021
- Preceded by: Asadur Rahman Kiron; as Acting Mayor
- Succeeded by: Asadur Rahman Kiron; as Acting Mayor

Personal details
- Born: 7 May 1979 (age 47) Gazipur District, Bangladesh
- Party: Bangladesh Awami League
- Parent: Jayeda Khatun (mother)
- Education: Bhawal Badre Alam Government College

Md. Zahangir Alam (born 7 May 1979) is a former mayor of Gazipur City Corporation, an Awami League politician and businessman. Aligned with the Bangladesh Awami League, he was elected as the second mayor of the Gazipur City Corporation in July 2018. He is the managing director of Honourable Textile Composite Ltd and Z Alam Apparels. He was the general secretary of Gazipur metropolitan Awami League until he was expelled by Awami League central working committee on 19 November 2021. Jahangir was pardoned and got back his Awami League membership on 1 January 2023. The LGRD Ministry suspended Alam on 25 November 2021 from the mayor post of Gazipur City Corporation (GCC) on the allegations of illegal land grabbing, not compensating people after taking over land for development and working against the public interest.

== Early life and education ==
Alam was born in Gazipur District. He passed his SSC and HSC exams from Bhawal Badre Alam Govt. College. He completed graduation and post graduation from the same college. After that, he graduated with an LLB degree from the National University in Bangladesh.

== Political career ==
In July 2018 Alam was elected mayor of Gazipur City Corporation as the Bangladesh Awami League candidate. In the election he earned 400,010 votes while Hasan Uddin Sarkar, managed to secure 197,611 votes. He was the former vice-president of the Bangladesh Chhatra League and vice-chairman of Gazipur Sadar Upazila.

=== Mayor of Gazipur City Corporation ===
During the 2019-20 session, Alam announced a budget of approximately US$700 million in income and US$550 million in expense for Gazipur City Corporation. While working as a mayor of Gazipur City Corporation, mayor Alam disclosed about corruption and irregularities in the city corporation. In May 2019 at a press briefing, he revealed that 14 employees of Gazipur City Corporation got show cause notice over corruption and irregularity charges. In July same year in another press briefing, he informed the journalists that among the 14 accused employees, 6 had been suspended, 3 had been temporarily suspended and the remaining 5 had been served show-cause notices for alleged corruption.

An account was opened in the name of Zahangir Alam at Premier Bank LTD's Konabari branch on February 25, 2020, and was later used for transactions involving Gazipur City Corporation (GCC) funds. The account received Tk 2.60 crore collected as advance holding taxes and building plan penalties from four companies: Ispahani Foods Limited, Fin-Bangla Apparels Ltd, Honeywell Garments Ltd, and GMS Composite Knitting Ind Ltd. These funds, paid through five pay orders, were intended for the city corporation's account but were instead deposited into the mayor's personal account. The money was subsequently withdrawn by two of the mayor's caretakers, Polo Chakma and Shahidul, and never reached the city corporation's fund. GCC documents indicate that the mayor personally embezzled the entire sum.

On 11 May 2020, Delwoar Hossain, the executive engineer of Gazipur City Corporation was murdered allegedly by his colleague. The investigation agency and Delwoar's family suspect that the motive behind Delwoar's murder was a corruption of the city corporation projects. Police arrested Anisur Rahman Selim, an assistant engineer of Gazipur City Corporation as a suspect of the murder case. Mayor Alam told the Prothom Alo that he knew about the corruption of Selim but never took any measures against him. Alam told another news channel, Channel i that he suspected the murder could be caused because of bribe money from contractors.

On 4 October 2021, the Awami League sent a show cause notice to Alam after a video of him making controversial remarks on former president Sheikh Mujibur Rahman and the number of deaths in the Bangladesh Liberation War leaked and went viral on social media. On 19 November, he was expelled from the Awami League over the comments. Justices Mamnoon Rahman and Khandaker Diliruzzaman of High Court Division issued an order asking Alam why contempt of court proceedings should not begin against him for not obeying a 2018 court order that asked him not to disturb the property of the petitioner, Ashraf Uddin Ahmed. The Local Government Division suspended Alam from the office of mayor of Gazipur on 26 November. Eight cases were filed against him over his comments in which he was able to secure bail.

Md. Tajul Islam, Minister of Local Government, Rural Development and Cooperatives, announced plans in December 2022 to return Alam to the Awami League and described his previous expulsion as a temporary suspension. On 21 January 2023, Alam was conditionally allowed to rejoin the Awami League.
