= Pirujali Union =

Coordinates: 24.1368°N 90.3661°E

Pirujali Union পিরুজালী ইউনিয়ন
- Union
- Location in Bangladesh
- Country: Bangladesh
- Division: Dhaka Division
- District: Gazipur District

Population (2014)
  - Total: 40,000
  - Density: 1,318/km^{2} (3,410/sq mi)
- Time zone: UTC+6
- Website: pirujaliup.gazipur.gov.bd

Pirujali Union is a union parishad under Gazipur Sadar Upazila, Gazipur District, Bangladesh.

== Administration ==
Pirujali Union is located near Dhaka-Mymensingh highway. This is a small Union with 10 villages in it. This union has 2 Secondary School, 6 primary school, 4 madrasa one of which is of degree level and more than 40 mosques in it. Some of the villages, are:

- Borta Para
- Sorkar Para
- Alim Para
- Master Para
- Moddhopara
- Bokchar para

== Education ==
Pirujali Union, previously known as Pirujali Village is one of the most educated villages in Gazipur. This union has a lot of educational institutions including 7 primary schools, 2 high schools, a senior madrasa with some other madrasas. Such as:

- Pirujali High School
- Pirujali Adorsho High School
- Pirujali Sishu kanon
- Pirujali senior Madrasa, Shorkar para

Open Library:

- Alokbortika Public Library

== Notable residents ==
The union is known for being the burial place of popular writer Humayun Ahmed. Nuhash Polli is situated here. Humayun Ahmed built this Villa in 40 acres of land. He shot a large number of films and dramas here as a director. Without this Villa, there are a lot of shooting stops in this Union, including:

- Priyo Ongon
