= Mohi Uddin Shamim =

Bangladeshi Judge

The Honourable Mohi Uddin Shamim

Justice of the High Court Division of Bangladesh
- Incumbent
- Assumed office 1 April 1995

Personal details
- Born: May 19, 1970 (age 56)
- Education: University of Dhaka, University of Wolverhampton
- Profession: Judge

Mohi Uddin Shamim is a Justice of the High Court Division of the Bangladesh Supreme Court.

== Early life ==
Shamim was born on 19 May 1970. He has a bachelor's and master's in law from the University of Dhaka. He did a second bachelor of law from the University of Wolverhampton. He finished a Bar Vocational Course at the University of Northumbria. He is registered at Lincoln's Inn.

== Career ==
Shamim became a lawyer of the District Courts on 1 April 1995.

Shamim became a High Court Division lawyer on 20 April 2005.

Shamim was appointed an additional judge of the High Court Division on 31 May 2018. After his appointment, he and 17 new judges visited the mausoleum of Sheikh Mujibur Rahman in Tungipara. In October, Shamim issued a dissent verdict rejecting the bail petition of Dr Zafrullah Chowdhury, founder of Gonoshasthaya Kendra, while his co-judge on the bench, Justice Muhammad Abdul Hafiz, granted four weeks anticipatory bail in the extortion case. The case was then sent to the chief justice to be assigned to a different bench. Shamim and Justice Muhammad Abdul Hafiz granted bail to barrister Mainul Hosein in two defamation cases related to his comments on journalist Masuda Bhatti.

Shamim was made a permanent Judge of the High Court Division on 30 May 2020 by President Md Abdul Hamid.

Shmam and Justice Md Nazrul Islam Talukder granted bail to the member of parliament from Bogra-2 and Jatiya Party politician, Shariful Islam Jinnah, in a corruption case. In April, Shamim and Justice Md Ashfaqul Islam summoned the District Commissioners of Dhaka and surrounding district over their failure to reduce air pollution. In August 2021, Shamim and Justice Md Nazrul Islam Talukder criticized the Anti-Corruption Commission for its failure to complete probes on time.

In February 2022, Shamim and Justice ASM Abdul Mobin rejected petitions challenging the Digital Security Act cases against journalist Shafiqul Islam Kajol allowing the cases to proceed. Shamim and Justice ASM Abdul Mobin granted bail to Dipti Rani Das, a juvenile college student from Dinajpur District, who had been jailed under the Digital Security Act for hurting religious comments through a Facebook comment.

In May 2023, Shamim and Justice Md Mozibur Rahman Miah rejected the application of Robi Axiata challenging a lower court verdict which allowed the former CEO of Robi Axiata Mahtab Uddin Ahmed to proceed with his lawsuit over an unfair dismissal and compensation.
