= Muhammad Abdul Hafiz =

Bangladeshi judge

The Honourable Muhammad Abdul Hafiz

Justice of the Appellate Division of Bangladesh
- In office 27 April 2005 – 30 May 2024

Personal details
- Born: 1 June 1957 (age 68)
- Education: University of Dhaka
- Profession: Judge

Muhammad Abdul Hafiz (M. A. Hafiz) was a judge of the Appellate Division of the Supreme Court of Bangladesh. Before his elevation to the Appellate Division Justice Mr. Hafiz was the most senior judge of the High Court Division of the Supreme Court of Bangladesh.

== Early life ==
Abdul Hafiz was born on 1 June 1957. He completed his bachelor's degree and master's at the University of Dhaka.

== Career ==
Abdul Hafiz was enrolled as an Advocate of the Dhaka District Court in 1982. In 1985, Abdul Hafiz became a lawyer of the High Court Division of the Bangladesh Supreme Court.

Abdul Hafiz was appointed to the High Court Division as an Additional Judge on 27 April 2003. On 27 April 2005, Abdul Hafiz was made a permanent judge of the High Court Division of Bangladesh Supreme Court. He was elevated to the Appellate Division of the Supreme Court of Bangladesh on April 25, 2024.

Abdul Hafiz and Justice AKM Fazlur Rahman granted bail to 11 defendants accused in the Shamim Reza Rubel murder on 6 May 2010. On 7 July 2010, Abdul Hafiz and Justice Afzal Hossain Ahmed granted bail to 13 activists of Bangladesh Jatiyatabadi Chhatra Dal in a case filed by an activist of the Bangladesh Chhatra League, who alleged they were attacked by the accused in Madhur Canteen of the University of Dhaka. On the same day Justice Afzal Hossain Ahmed granted bail to eight members of Bangladesh Jamaat-e-Islami.

On 8 June 2011, Abdul Hafiz and Justice Sheikh Rezowan Ali granted bail to Abdus Salam Pintu and Nasiruddin Ahmed Pintu, Bangladesh Nationalist Party politicians, in two separate hearings that day.

On 28 August 2018, Abdul Hafiz and Justice Bhishmadev Chakrabortty granted bail to Amir Khasru Mahmud Chowdhury, a politician of the Bangladesh Nationalist Party. The same day they asked the government of Bangladesh to return the passport of the mayor of Sylhet, Ariful Haque Choudhury, to him. On 4 October, Abdul Hafiz and Justice Kashefa Hussain granted bail to 11 politicians of the Bangladesh Nationalist Party, Abdul Moyeen Khan, Amanullah Aman, Gayeshwar Chandra Roy, Mirza Fakhrul Islam Amalgam, Mirza Abbas, Nazrul Islam Khan, and Ruhul Kuddus Talukder Dulu on sedition charges. On 22 October, Abdul Hafiz and Justice Mohi Uddin Shamim granted bail to barrister Mainul Hosein in two separate defamation cases.

On 21 January 2019, Abdul Hafiz and Justice Mohi Uddin Shamim granted bail to two journalists accused in a Digital Security Act case filed by Debashish Chowdhury, Upazila Nirbahi Officer of Batiaghata Upazila. Hafiz and Justice Kashefa Hussain granted bail to former prime minister Khaleda Zia on 18 June 2019. On 26 November 2019, Abdul Hafiz and Justice Kazi Md Ejarul Haque Akondo extended the bail to former prime minister Khaleda Zia by one year in a defamation case filed by Bangladesh Jananetri Parishad.

Abdul Hafiz and Justice Muhammad Mahbub Ul Islam on 11 October 2020 granted bail to an accused in a Digital Security Act case for posting offensive statements about Sheikh Mujibur Rahman, the first president of Bangladesh, and Narendra Modi, the Prime Minister of India.

Abdul Hafiz and Justice Mohammad Ali on 17 June 2021 granted bail to Nipun Roy Chowdhury, a Bangladesh Nationalist Party politician and daughter-in-law of Gayeshwar Roy, in three cases which were filed after a recording of a phone call in which she allegedly ordered the torching of buses on March 28 during Hefajat-e-Islam's protests of police violence against demonstrators denouncing PM Modi's visit to Dhaka. On 28 September 2021, Abdul Hafiz and Justice Mohammad Ali extended the bail granted to former prime minister Khaleda Zia by five years.

Justice Abdul Hafiz was elevated as a judge of the Appellate Division from the High Court Division on April 25, 2024 and retired on June 1, 2024 In his speech at the event organized to celebrate his retirement Justice Muhammad Abdul Hafiz denounced the corruption that affected Bangladeshi society:

We have to keep all the workplaces free of corruption. The country's people are astonished to learn how some service holders are making crores through corruption. The state has to take the responsibility to resist the corruption. The mentality of getting rich fast is pushing us towards a huge disaster.

As one account of the event notes without comment, "Chief Justice Obaidul Hassan and his other colleague judges of the Appellate Division were present on the dais at the time."
