= Gazipur Development Authority =

Planning Agency Of Dhaka Metropolitan Area

- গাজীপুর উন্নয়ন কর্তৃপক্ষ

Agency overview
- Formed: 2021; 5 years ago
- Superseding agency: Development of Gazipur
- Jurisdiction: Gazipur
- Headquarters: Gazipur, Bangladesh
- Agency executive: Kazi Syedul Alam Babul, Chairman
- Parent department: Ministry of Housing and Public Works
- Parent agency: Government of Bangladesh
- Website: gda.gov.bd

The Gazipur Development Authority (Bengali: গাজীপুর উন্নয়ন কর্তৃপক্ষ, romanized: Gājīpur Unnôẏôn Kôrtipôkkhô; abbreviated as GDA) is a self-governing urban development authority in Gazipur, Bangladesh, responsible for planning, regulating, and implementing the city’s master plan. Established in 2021 by the Government of Bangladesh, the authority oversees urban growth and prepares comprehensive master plans that are periodically reviewed to guide long-term urban development. The GDA operates under the Ministry of Housing and Public Works.

== History ==
The Cabinet of Bangladesh led by Prime Minister Sheikh Hasina approved the creation of Gazipur Development Authority to plan the development and expansion of Gazipur City in October 2019.

On 8 September 2020, Bangladesh parliament passed the Gazipur Unnayan Kartripakkha Bill, 2020 which established the Gazipur Development Authority. The bill was placed by Sharif Ahmed, State Minister for Housing and Public Works. There is some jurisdictional overlap with the Rajdhani Unnayan Kartripakkha. The opposition Jatiya Party questioned the need of the authority, suggesting it would be a waste of public money and that the relationship between the authority and the Gazipur City Corporation was unclear.

Md Hemayet Hossain, Additional Secretary of the Ministry of Housing and Public Works, was appointed chairman of the Gazipur Development Authority on 23 November 2021.

The Daily Star reported that the Gazipur Development Authority had failed to appoint a chairperson and staff on 27 October 2022. On 4 June 2023, Azmat Ullah Khan, President of Gazipur City unit of the Awami League, was appointed chairperson of the Gazipur Development Authority. He had lost the mayoral election to Zaida Khatun.
