= M. A. Mannan =

Bangladeshi politician (1950–2022)

- এম. এ. মান্নান

1st Mayor of Gazipur
- In office 1 June 2017 – 6 July 2017
- Preceded by: Asadur Rahman Kiron; as Acting Mayor
- Succeeded by: Asadur Rahman Kiron; as Acting Mayor
- In office 6 July 2013 – 11 February 2015
- Preceded by: Position established
- Succeeded by: Asadur Rahman Kiron; as Acting Mayor

Minister of State for Religious Affairs
- In office 20 March 1991 – 30 March 1996
- Prime Minister: Khaleda Zia
- Preceded by: Kazi Shah Mofazzal Hossain Kaikobad
- Succeeded by: Abdur Rahman Khan

Member of the Bangladesh Parliament for Gazipur-2
- In office 5 March 1991 – 24 November 1995
- Preceded by: Hasan Uddin Sarkar
- Succeeded by: Ahsanullah Master

Personal details
- Born: 1950 Gazipur, East Bengal, Pakistan
- Died: 28 April 2022 (aged 72) Dhaka, Bangladesh
- Party: Bangladesh Nationalist Party
- Education: University of Dhaka
- Awards: Bir Bikrom

Mohammad Abdul Mannan (1950 – 28 April 2022) was a politician of the Bangladesh Nationalist Party. He was the first elected city mayor of Gazipur City Corporation of Bangladesh. Before that, he served as the religious affairs minister of Bangladesh from 1991 to 1993. He also served as the minister of science and technology from 1993 to 1995.

== Career ==
Abdul Mannan was elected Gazipur City Corporation mayor in July 2013 and assumed office in August. In February 2015, police arrested him for his suspected involvement in an arson attack on a bus in Gazipur in February of the same year. The next month, panel mayor and local Awami League leader Asadur Rahman Kiron, who was elected a ward councillor, was made acting mayor upon a court directive. Mannan was released from jail in March 2016. He was arrested again in April of the same year and released in January 2017. He rejoined the office in June 2017, but the Local Government Division (LGD) suspended him for the third time on 6 July 2017.
