= National Agriculture Training Academy =

Research institute in Bangladesh

- Formation: 1976
- Headquarters: Joydebpur, Gazipur, Bangladesh
- Region served: Bangladesh
- Official language: Bengali
- Website: nata.portal.gov.bd

National Agriculture Training Academy is an autonomous national research and training institute under the Department of Agriculture Extension of the Ministry of Agriculture and is located in Joydebpur, Gazipur, Bangladesh. Dr. Md. Abu Saeed Mian is the director general of the National Agriculture Training Academy.

== History ==
The program started in 1960 as the Pakistan Japan Agricultural Extension Training Institute. In 1965, the name was changed to Farm Mechanization Training Institute. After the Independence of Bangladesh, the government felt the institute was important and as a result the Central Extension Resources Development Institute was established in 1976 as a joint venture between the governments of Bangladesh and Japan. Japan withdrew from the institute in 1983, the institute was reorganized through a gazette notification on 27 June 1984. On 3 April 2013 the organization was reorganized and renamed to National Agriculture Training Academy.
