= Jayeda Khatun =

Bangladeshi politician

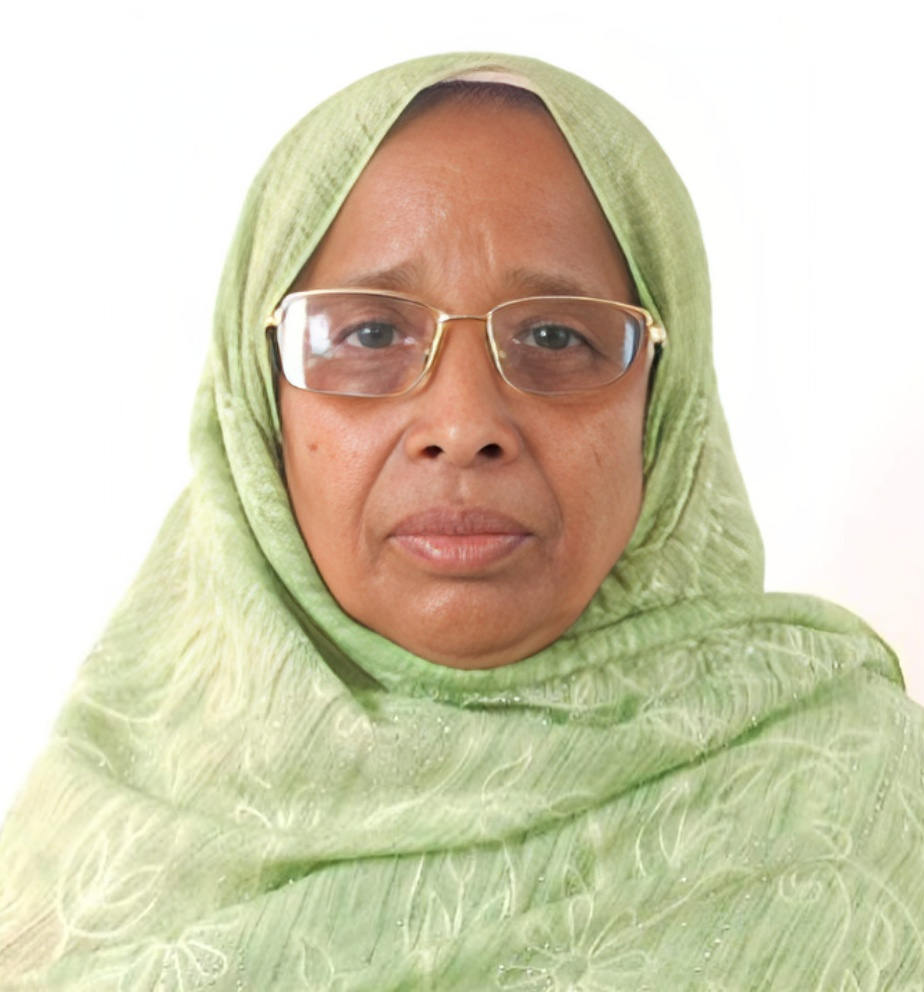
- Jayeda Khatun in 2023

3rd Mayor of Gazipur
- In office 11 September 2023 – 19 August 2024
- Preceded by: Zahangir Alam; as Mayor
- Succeeded by: Md. Sabirul Islam; as Administrator

Personal details
- Born: 10 February 1962 (age 64) Gazipur District, Bangladesh
- Party: Independent
- Spouse: Mizanur Rahman
- Children: Zahangir Alam (son)

Jayeda Khatun is a Bangladeshi housewife-turned-politician who was Former mayor of Gazipur. She was elected as mayor of the Gazipur City Corporation in the 2023 city election, contesting as an independent candidate and defeating Awami League candidate Azmat Ullah Khan.

She is the mother of former mayor of Gazipur Zahangir Alam.

== Political career ==
Khatun's entry into politics was driven by her son Zahangir Alam's expulsion from the Awami League, which sparked sympathy among voters. Her campaign focused on the development work undertaken by her son during his tenure as mayor.

== Personal life ==
Khatun was born on February 10, 1962, in the Kanaya area of Gazipur City Corporation. She and her husband Mizanur Rahman are parents to two sons and a daughter. Her husband died in 2018.
