= Md. Abu Zafor Siddique =

Bangladeshi judge

Justice of the High Court Division of Bangladesh

Personal details
- Born: January 2, 1959 (age 67)
- Education: RU
- Profession: Judge

Abu Zafor Siddique is a retired judge of the Appellate Division of the Supreme Court of Bangladesh.

== Early life ==
Siddique was born on 2 January 1959. He completed his bachelor's degree and master's in law from the University of Rajshahi.

== Career ==
Siddique became a lawyer of the District Courts in 1985.

In 1998, Siddique became a lawyer of the High Court Division of Bangladesh Supreme Court.

On 18 April 2010, Siddique was appointed a judge of the High Court Division.

Siddique was made a permanent judge of the High Court Division on 15 April 2012.

In November 2017, Siddique, Justice Md. Shawkat Hossain, and Justice Md. Nazrul Islam Talukder issued a verdict in the Bangladesh Rifles revolt case. He observed in the verdict that the mutineers wanted to destabilize the country and government of Prime Minister Sheikh Hasina.

Siddique in a hearing on 1 March 2018 declared the parliamentary membership of Nizam Hazari to be legal after a petition was filed challenging it based in Hazari's past conviction in an arms case.

In March 2020, Siddique and Justice A. S. M. Abdul Mobin granted permanent bail to former prime minister Khaleda Zia in a defamation case filed in Narail District after Khaleda Zia questioned the number of deaths in the Bangladesh Liberation War in 2015 at the Institution of Engineers, Bangladesh. They revoked the bail later on the same day after the government of Bangladesh objected. The bail granted lasted for two hours.

In June 2021, Siddique and Justice K. M. Hafizul Alam, ordered the arrest of four, including two lawyers, for forging a bail order of the High Court Division. He elevated to the Appellate Division from High Court in December 2022 by superseding many of his colleagues. He compelled to resigned in the face of student protests on 10 August 2024.

== Personal life ==
Siddique's son, Md Jumman Siddiqui, failed Bangladesh Bar Council examinations multiple times but yet had his name in a gazette listing the lawyers allowed to practice in the supreme court. Justices Tariq ul Hakim and Md Iqbal Kabir of the supreme court issued an order to halt the notice and asked why his name was listed in the gazette.
