= Md Atoar Rahman =

Bangladeshi judge

Justice of the High Court Division of Bangladesh

Personal details
- Profession: Judge

Md Atoar Rahman is a Justice of the High Court Division of the Bangladesh Supreme Court.

== Early life ==
Atoar Rahman was born on 4 May 1961. He did his undergraduate and graduate studies in law at the University of Dhaka.

== Career ==
Atoar Rahman joined the judicial branch of the Bangladesh Civil Service on 22 February 1984.

On 10 October 2006, Atoar Rahman was promoted to District and Sessions Judge. Atoar Rahman became the Senior District and Sessions Judge on 10 October 2011.

In April 2017, Atoar Rahman, Judge of the Drug Court, granted bail to Mizanur Rahman, managing director of Rid Pharmaceuticals Limited, and his wife Sheuli Rahman in a case over the death of 28 children who died after consuming contaminated paracetamol manufactured by their pharmaceutical company in 2009.

Atoar Rahman was appointed an Additional Judge of the High Court Division on 31 May 2018. On 30 May 2020, Atoar Rahman was made a permanent judge of the High Court Division. He and 17 other judges had to be sworn in twice as the first time they faced technical problems in a virtual ceremony and the second was held in person.

In December 2020, Atoar Rahman and Justice Md Rezaul Haque stayed trial proceedings against Matiur Rahman, editor of Prothom Alo, for six months in a case filed over the death of a student of the Dhaka Residential Model College by electrocution at the program of the newspaper.

Atoar Rahman and Justice Md Rezaul Haque granted bail to Mahfuzur Rahman Sharod, in a case over the rape and blackmail of a student of the University of Rajshahi in April. The bail was canceled by Justice Hasan Foez Siddique, of the Appellate Division of the Bangladesh Supreme Court, due to the specific nature of the charges against the accused. In December 2021, Atoar Rahman and Justice Jahangir Hossain Selim granted anticipatory bail to Rafiath Rashid Mithila and Sabnam Faria in a case over the collapse of Evaly. Atoar Rahman and Justice Jahangir Hossain Selim granted bail to Ruma Sarker, professor of the Begum Badrunnesa Government Girls' College, who was arrested by the Rapid Action Battalion in a Digital Security Act case for making comments on a murder case on Facebook. The bail application was opposed by the Deputy Attorney General, Sarwar Hossain Bappi. Atoar Rahman and Justice Jahangir Hossain Selim criticized the government for promoting sub-inspector Nayan Kumar, who had tortured a 12 year old into signing a confession.

Atoar Rahman and Justice ASM Abdul Mobin issued a stay order on three cases against photojournalist Shafiqul Islam Kajol under the Digital Security Act in June 2022.
