= Borta Para =

Borta Para is a small village situated in Pirujali Union, Gazipur District, Bangladesh. Borta Para is the entrance of this union. This village is near the Dhaka-Mymensingh highway and is connected to the highway by a wide road.
