= Rani Bilashmoni Government Boys' High School =

Rani Bilasmoni Government Boys' High School
- রাণী বিলাসমনি সরকারি বালক উচ্চ বিদ্যালয়

Location
- Railgate-Rajbari Road, Joydebpur; Gazipur; Bangladesh; 23.9994°N 90.4247°E

Information
- Motto: Come to learn & Go out to serve
- Established: 1905
- Founder: Queen Bilashmoni Devi
- School board: Dhaka Education Board
- Grades: 6-10
- Gender: Male
- Age range: 13-17
- Enrollment: 1800
- Language: Bengali
- Campus size: 3.98 acres
- Campus type: Urban
- Publication: RBMSC Magazine (annual)
- Website: www.rbmgbhs.edu.bd

The Rani Bilashmoni Government Boys' High School (Bengali: রাণী বিলাসমণি সরকারী বালক উচ্চ বিদ্যালয়) is a secondary school in Gazipur, Bangladesh.

== About ==
Rani Bilashmoni Government Boys' High School was established in 1905. It is situated at the center of Gazipur City and near Bhawal Rajbari. The school was named after queen Rani Bilashmoni. It has been in existence for more than 100 years. The education level started from 6th Grade up to Secondary School Certificate exam (S.S.C.). The school has an information exchange program with John Marshall Middle School in Wichita, Kansas.

== Description ==
The establishment of Rani Bilashmoni Government Boys' High School has a historic background. It was an initiative taken by Bhawal King Raja Rajendra Narayan to establish this school in 1905 in his wife's name. It was registered as a government school in April 1981.

The school stands at the center of Joydebpur, Gazipur. The main school building is located on the western side of the 'Rajbari Maidan'. Near to it are the District Commissioner's office and the District Judge Court. There is a separate office building opposite the main school building for official works. It also holds the Headmaster's office. The school holds classes from grade six to ten in two shifts. As one of the schools with better quality of teaching staff, the admission process is competitive. The school runs in two shifts. The morning shift starts from 7:00 a.m. and runs till 12:00 p.m. The day shift begins at 12:30 p.m. and ends at 5:00 p.m. The school has about two thousand students.
