= Shaheed Tajuddin Ahmad Medical College =

Bangladeshi government medical school

- শহীদ তাজউদ্দীন আহমদ মেডিকেল কলেজ
- Other name: শতামেক/STAMC
- Former name: Gazipur Medical College
- Type: Public medical school
- Established: 2013
- Academic affiliations: University of Dhaka
- Principal: Professor Dr. Jubaida Sultana
- Director: Dr Md Aminul Islam
- Students: 125
- Undergraduates: 360
- Location: Gazipur, Gazipur District, Bangladesh; 23.9921°N 90.4247°E
- Campus: Urban.
- Language: English.
- Website: https://stamc.edu.bd/

Shaheed Tajuddin Ahmad Medical College is a government medical school in Bangladesh, established in 2013. It is located in Gazipur. The college is affiliated with University of Dhaka as a constituent college.

It offers a five-year MBBS degree programme and admits 125 students every year.

== History ==
The college was formed as Gazipur Medical College. On 18 November 2013, it was renamed in August 2014. It was named after Tajuddin Ahmad, the first prime minister of Bangladesh.

== See also ==
- List of medical colleges in Bangladesh
