= A. S. M. Abdul Mobin =

Bangladeshi Judge

Justice of the High Court Division of Bangladesh
- Incumbent
- Assumed office 8 March 1985

Personal details
- Born: 5 February 1959 (age 67)
- Profession: Judge

A. S. M. Abdul Mobin is a justice of the High Court Division of the Bangladesh Supreme Court.

== Early life ==
Abdul Mobin was born on 5 February 1959. He has a bachelor's in art and another in law.

== Career ==
Abdul Mobin started his legal practice as a lawyer of the district courts on 8 March 1985. He moved up to the High Court Division on 26 February 1989. Abdul Mobin became a lawyer in the Appellate Division of the Bangladesh Supreme Court on 13 December 2009. On 31 May 2018, Abdul Mobin was appointed an additional judge of the Bangladesh High Court.

In September 2019, Abdul Mobin and Justice Farid Ahmed denied bail to the former director of the Anti-Corruption Commission in a corruption case in which he was accused of taking a 4.5 million BDT bribe from former deputy inspector general of police Mizanur Rahman.

In March 2020, Abdul Mobin and Justice Md Abu Zafor Siddique granted permanent bail to former prime minister Khaleda Zia in a defamation case based on her comments on Sheikh Mujibur Rahman and the number of casualties in the Bangladesh Liberation War. The permanent bail was canceled two hours later, following an appeal by Deputy Attorney General Samira Tarannum Rabeya.

In September, Abdul Mobin and Justice Krishna Debnath acquitted eight former personnel of Rajarbagh Police Telecom for killing one of their colleagues in 2006 due to lack of evidence. In November, Abdul Mobin and Justice Krishna Debnath commuted the death sentence of Russell, who murdered his ex at the University of Barishal, on 5 September 2013, to a life sentence. In December, Abdul Mobin and Justice Krishna Debnath removed the death sentences of three accused of killing a six-year-old boy, Hridoy, as the court found the suspects' confessions were obtained through torture. Justice Hasan Foez Siddique of the Appellate Division stayed the verdict after the government filed an appeal.

In February, Abdul Mobin and Justice Mohi Uddin Shamim granted bail to a 17-year-old Hindu girl who had been detained under the Digital Security Act for making a Facebook post hurting the sentiments of Muslims. In June 2022, Abdul Mobin and Justice Md Atoar Rahman dismissed three Digital Security Act cases against journalist Shafiqul Islam Kajol.
