= Gazipur Sadar Upazila =

Gazipur Sadar Upazila গাজীপুর সদর উপজেলা
- Upazila
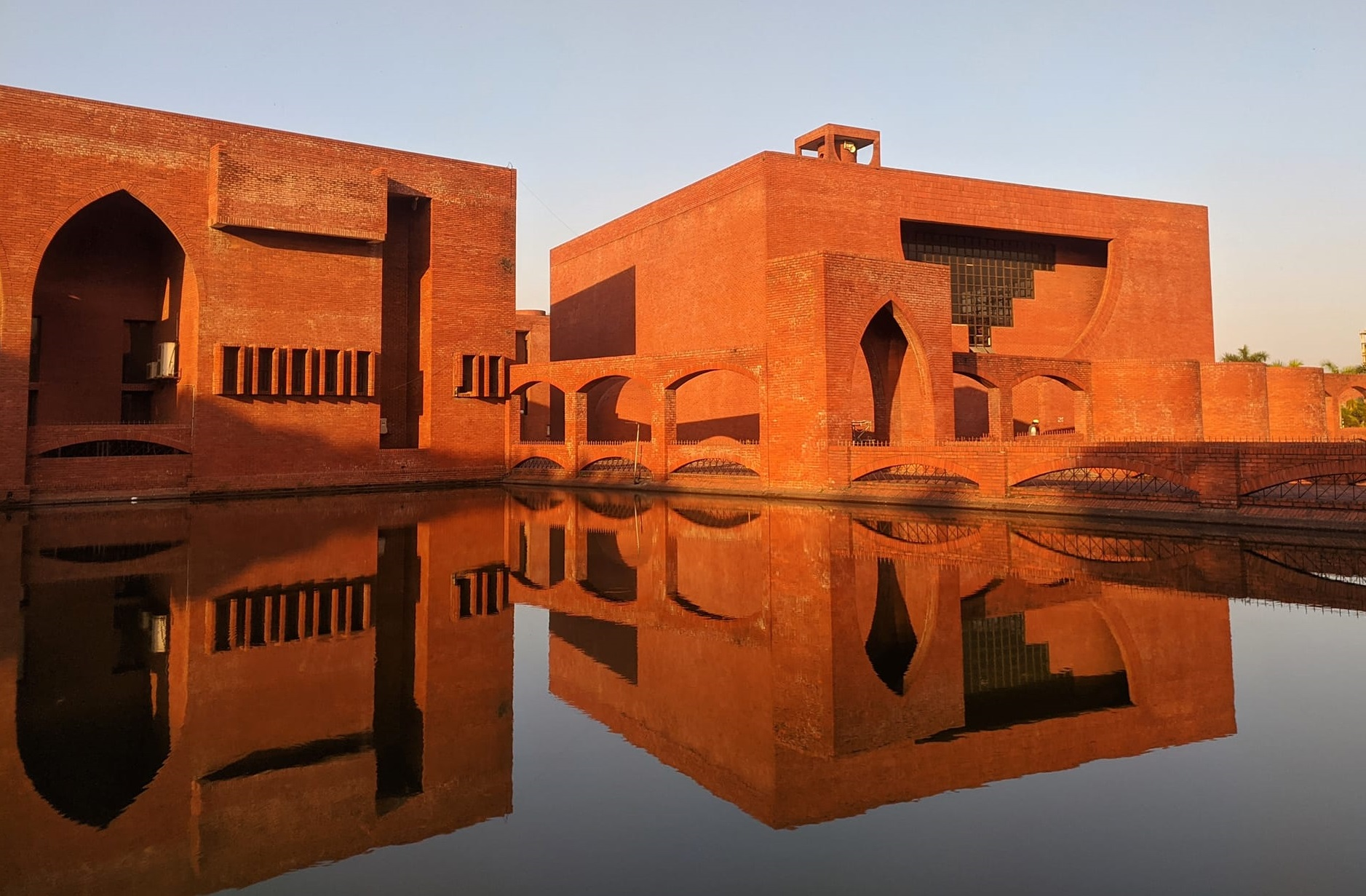
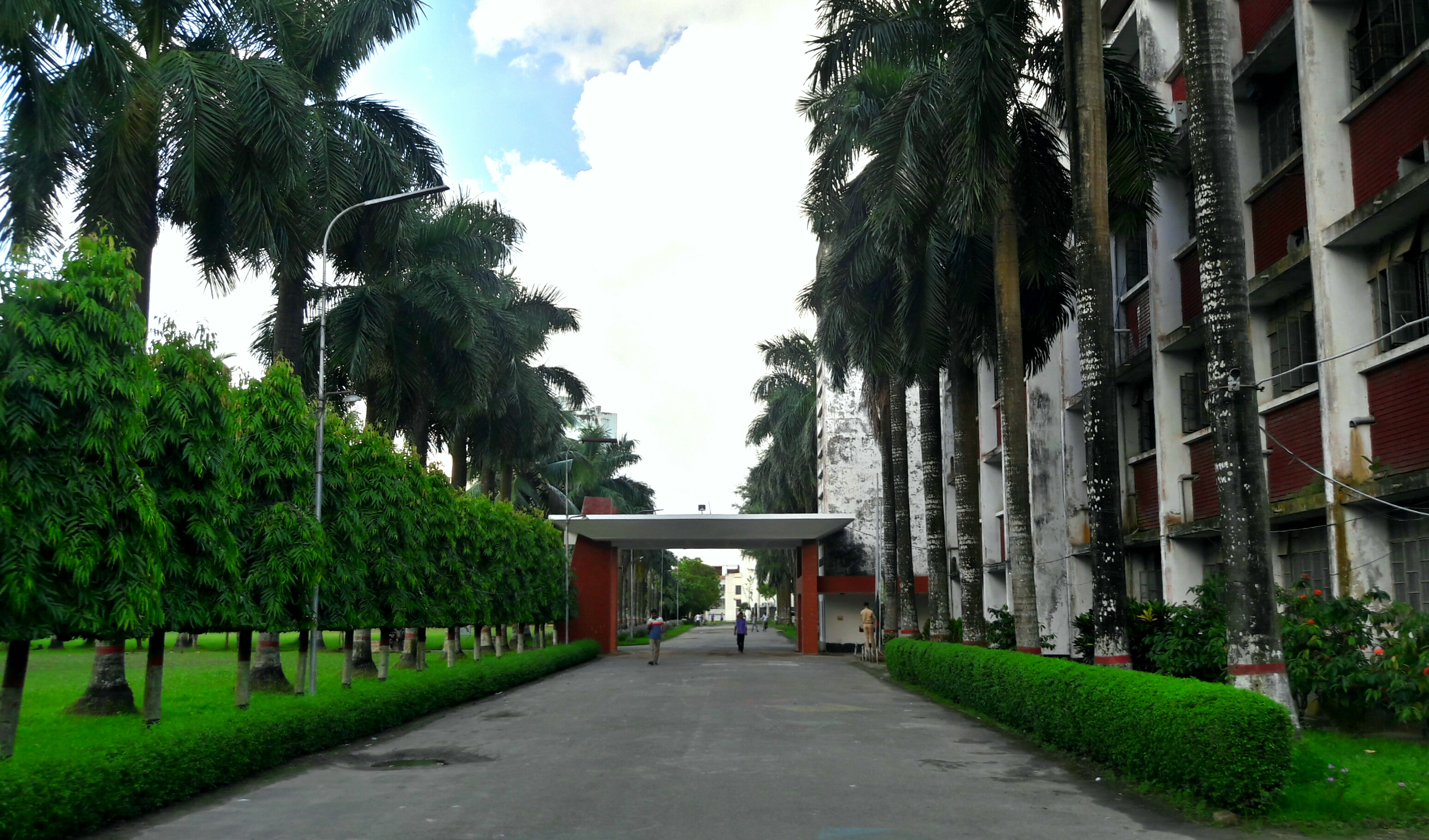
- Lake Auditorium, Islamic University of Technology, Dhaka University of Engineering & Technology

- Coordinates: 24°0′N 90°25.5′E
- Country: Bangladesh
- Division: Dhaka
- District: Gazipur

Area
  - Total: 457.67 km^{2} (176.71 sq mi)

Population (2022)
  - Total: 3,023,516
  - Density: 6,606.3/km^{2} (17,110/sq mi)
- Time zone: UTC+6 (BST)
- Postal code: 1700
- Area code: 0681
- Website: sadar.gazipur.gov.bd

Gazipur Sadar Upazila mauza geocode map

Gazipur Sadar (Bengali: গাজীপুর সদর) is an upazila (sub-district) of the Gazipur District in central Bangladesh, part of the Dhaka Division.

Gazipur Sadar is one of the five upazilas in the Gazipur district. It is bordered by the upazilas of Sreepur, Kaliganj, and Rupganj in the north and east, and Savar, Rupganj, Uttara Thana, Kaliakoir, and Savar in the south and west.

== Geography ==
Gazipur Sadar has a total area of 457.67 square kilometres (176.71 sq mi).

=== Water bodies ===
Main rivers:

- Turag
- Balu
- Labandaha
- Salida

Tongi Canal is also a significant water body.

== Demographics ==
Religions in Gazipur Sadar Upazila (2022)
Religion	Percent
Islam	94.00%
Hinduism	5.78%
Other or not stated	0.22%

According to the 2022 Bangladeshi census, Gazipur Sadar Upazila had 106,676 households and a population of 345,801. 7.92% of the population were under 5 years of age. Gazipur Sadar had a literacy rate (age 7 and over) of 80.68%: 83.22% for males and 77.86% for females, and a sex ratio of 110.63 males for every 100 females. 33,224 (9.61%) lived in urban areas.

According to the 2011 Census of Bangladesh, Gazipur Sadar Upazila had 449,139 households and a population of 1,820,374. 323,087 (17.75%) were under 10 years of age. Gazipur Sadar had a literacy rate (age 7 and over) of 66.76%, compared to the national average of 51.8%, and a sex ratio of 864 females per 1000 males. 689,411 (37.87%) lived in urban areas. Ethnic population was 5,358, of which 2,200 were Koch and 1,896 Barman.

According to 1991 Bangladesh census, Gazipur Upazila had a population of 588,492. Men and women made up 97.83% and 90.17% of the population respectively. The entire adult population was 322,434. Gazipur Upazila had an average literacy rate of 43.8% (7+ years), compared to the national average of 32.4%.

Total 866,540; male 471,768, female 394,772; Muslim 817,926, Hindu 45,068, Buddhist 3,185, Christian 188 and others 173. Indigenous communities such as Koach and Rajbangshi belong to this Upazila.

The top attractions to visit in Gazipur are: Nuhash Polli, Bangabandhu Safari Park, Bhawal National Park, Turag Waterfront Resort, and Bangabandhu Sheikh Mujib Safari Park.

== Administration ==
Gazipur Upazila, which was established in 1983, consists of Joydebpur and Tongi police stations.

Gazipur Sadar Upazila Parishad Chairman : Advocate Rina Parvin

Gazipur Sadar Upazila is divided into four union parishads: Baria, Bhaowal Gar, Mirzapur, and Pirujali.

Gazipur City Corporation was formed on 16 January 2013 from Gazipur Municipality, Tongi Municipality, and Gazipur Cantonment.

Gazipur Sadar Upazila Parishad is located near the Dhaka University of Engineering & Technology, Gazipur (DUET), BIDC Road, Gazipur.

== Education ==
Universities in Gazipur Sadar Upazilar : Dhaka University of Engineering and Technology, Islamic University of Technology, Bangladesh Open University and Bangladesh National University.

There are eight colleges in the Gazipur Sadar Upazila while Bhawal Badre Alam Government College is the only institute offering a master's degree.

According to Banglapedia, Rani Bilashmoni Govt. Boys' High School, founded in 1905, is a notable secondary school.

== See also ==
- Upazilas of Bangladesh
- Districts of Bangladesh
- Divisions of Bangladesh
