= Kaliakair Upazila =

Kaliakair কালিয়াকৈর
- Upazila
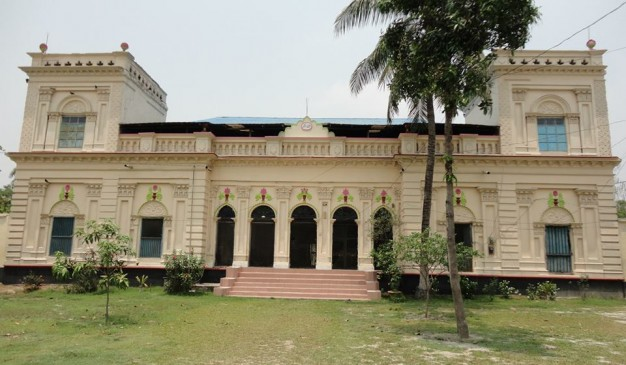
- Sreefatali Zamindar Bari

- Coordinates: 24°4.5′N 90°13′E
- Country: Bangladesh
- Division: Dhaka
- District: Gazipur
- Headquarters: Kaliakair

Government
  - Chairman: Kawsar Ahammad (UNO)

Area
  - Total: 314.13 km^{2} (121.29 sq mi)

Population (2022)
  - Total: 694,608
  - Density: 2,211.2/km^{2} (5,727.0/sq mi)
- Time zone: UTC+6 (BST)
- Postal code: 1750
- Area code: 06822
- Website: kaliakair.gazipur.gov.bd

Kaliakair Upazila mauza geocode map

Kaliakair (Bengali: কালিয়াকৈর) is an upazila (sub-district) of the Gazipur District in central Bangladesh, part of the Dhaka Division.

== Geography ==
Kaliakair is located at 24.0750°N 90.2167°E. It has a total area of 314.14 km^{2}. It is bounded by Mirzapur and Sakhipur upazilas on the north, Savar and Dhamrai upazilas on the south, Gazipur Sadar and Sreepur upazilas on the east, and Mirzapur upazila on the west.

Rivers in the region include the turag, bangshi, Salda; Boali, Hawla, Ujan and Markaj beels as well as the Goala and Betjuri canals.

== Demographics ==
Religions in Kaliakair Upazila (2022)
Religion	Percent
Islam	90.88%
Hinduism	8.88%
Other or not stated	0.24%

According to the 2022 Bangladeshi census, Kaliakair Upazila had 212,838 households and a population of 694,608. 7.56% of the population were under 5 years of age. Kaliakair had a literacy rate (age 7 and over) of 80.19%: 83.09% for males and 77.15% for females, and a sex ratio of 105.06 males for every 100 females. 274,593 (39.53%) lived in urban areas.

According to the 2011 Census of Bangladesh, Kaliakair Upazila had 116,749 households and a population of 483,308. 87,337 (18.07%) were under 10 years of age. Kaliakair had a literacy rate (age 7 and over) of 60.57%, compared to the national average of 51.8%, and a sex ratio of 947 females per 1000 males. 163,498 (33.83%) lived in urban areas. Ethnic population was 6,244 (1.29%), of which Barman were 3,150 and Koch 2,463. Nearly 1,400 people in the upazila are Christians, mainly living in urban areas.

As of the 1991 Bangladesh census, Kaliakair has a population of 232915. Males constitute 91.21% of the population, and females 85.79%. This Upazila's eighteen up population is 126799. Kaliakair has an average literacy rate of 32.3% (7+ years), and the national average of 32.4% literate.

Population Total '267003; male 138240, female 128763; Muslim 231672, Hindu 34306, Christian 910, Buddhist 30 and others 85. Indigenous communities such as Koch and Badey belong to this upazila.

== Economy ==
There are 1000+ garment factories in Kaliakair. Many garment workers live here.

== Administration ==
Kaliakair Thana was formed in 1923 and it was turned into an upazila on 2 July 1983.

Kaliakair Upazila is divided into Kaliakair Municipality and nine union parishads: Atabaha, Boali, Chapair, Dhaljora, Fulbari, Madhayapara, Mouchak, Sreefaltali, and Sutrapur. The union parishads are subdivided into 183 mauzas and 264 villages.

Kaliakair Municipality is subdivided into 9 wards and 18 mahallas.

== See also ==
- Upazilas of Bangladesh
- Districts of Bangladesh
- Divisions of Bangladesh
