= Sreepur =

City in Gazipur District, Dhaka Division

Sreepur শ্রীপুর
- City
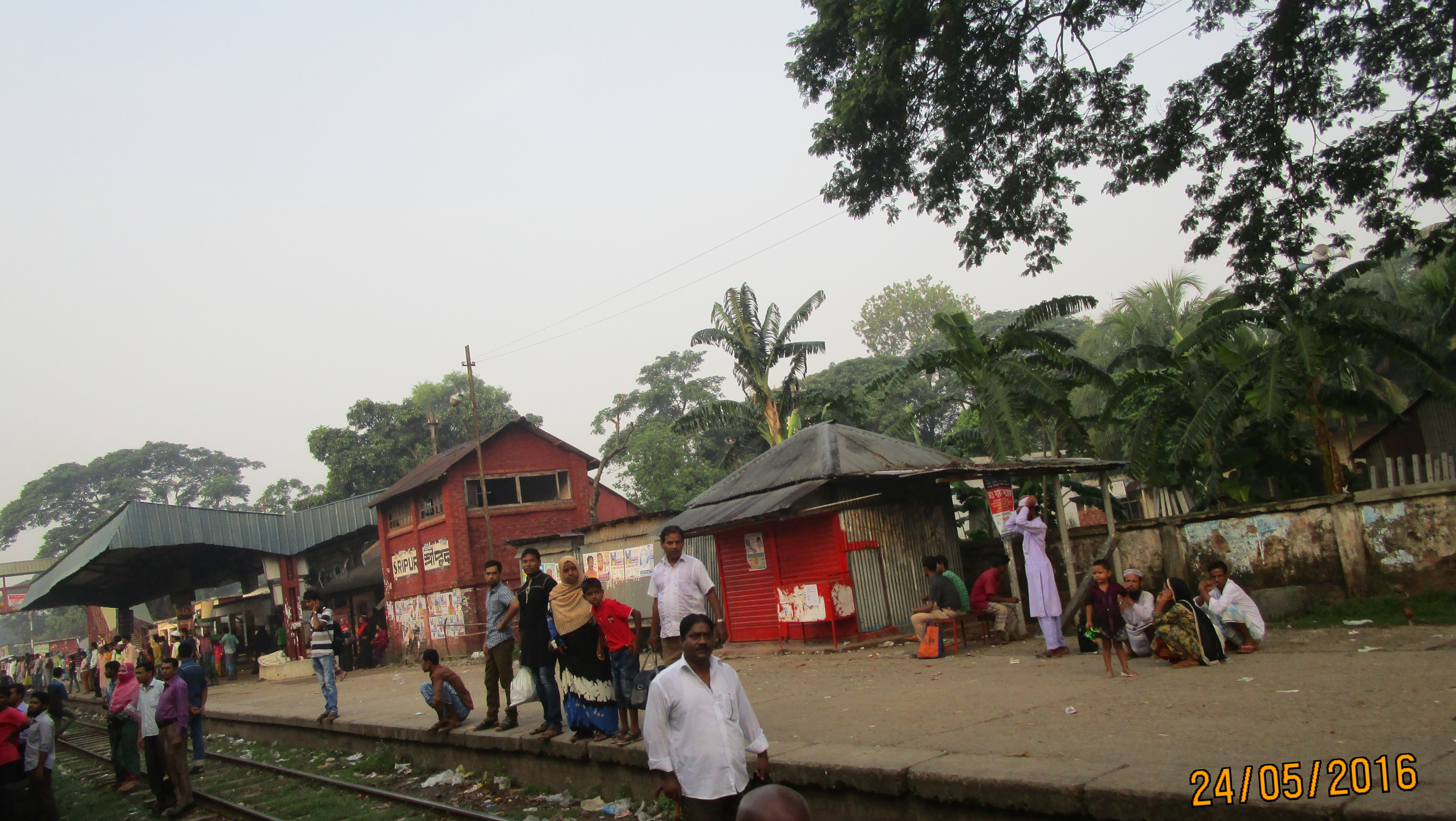
- Sreepur Railway Station

- Location in Dhaka division Location in Bangladesh
- Coordinates: 24.201144°N 90.484296°E
- Country: Bangladesh
- Division: Dhaka
- District: Gazipur
- Upazila: Sreepur

Government
  - Type: Mayor–Council
  - Body: Sreepur Municipality

Area
  - Total: 46.90 km^{2} (18.11 sq mi)

Population (2011)
  - Total: 258,973
  - Density: 5,522/km^{2} (14,300/sq mi)
  - Rank: 36th
- Time zone: UTC+6 (Bangladesh Time)
- National Dialing Code: +880

Sreepur Municipality mahallah geocode map

Sreepur (Bengali: শ্রীপুর) is a city in central Bangladesh, located in Gazipur District in the division of Dhaka. It is the administrative and urban centre of Sreepur Upazila. About 260,000 people live here which makes this city the 15th largest city in Bangladesh.

== Geography ==
Sreepur city is located at 24.201144°N 90.484296°E in the Gazipur District of central region of Bangladesh.

== Demographics ==
Religions in Sreepur (2022)
Religion	Percent
Islam	97.06%
Hinduism	2.52%
Other or not stated	0.42%

As of the 2022 Census of Bangladesh, Sreepur had 81,368 households and a population of 258,973. 16.23% of the population were under 10 years of age. Sreepur had a sex ratio of 113.47 males per 100 females and a literacy rate of 82.18%.

== Administration ==
Sreepur city is governed by a Paurashava named Sreepur municipality which consists of 9 wards and 20 mahallas. Sreepur municipality occupies an area of 46.90 km^{2} of the total city area. The entire city is administrated by Sreepur municipality.
