= Gano Front =

Bangladeshi political party

Gano Front গণফ্রন্ট People's Front
- President: Amirul Nuzhat
- Founder: Tipu Biswas
- Founded: 1995
- Split from: Workers Party of Bangladesh
- Ideology: Democratic socialism Secularism (Bangladeshi)
- Political position: Left-wing
- National affiliation: Democratic United Front
- House of the Nation: 0 / 350

Election symbol

Party flag

Gano Front (People's Front) is a left-wing political party in Bangladesh. It was founded by Tipu Biswas splitting from the Workers Party of Bangladesh in 1995.

== Activities ==
In November 2007, it has joined 10 other leftist political parties in forming the platform "Gonotantrik Bam Morcha". The platform presented 15 demands, including that Fakhruddin Ahmed's caretaker government lift the state of emergency and allow political activities nationwide. In May 2010, it was again joined most other leftist political parties to put forward a unified list of 11 demands in the areas of economics, justice, corruption, and abuse of power.
