= Bhawal Badre Alam Government College =

Educational institution of Bangladesh

- ভাওয়াল বদরে আলম সরকারি কলেজ
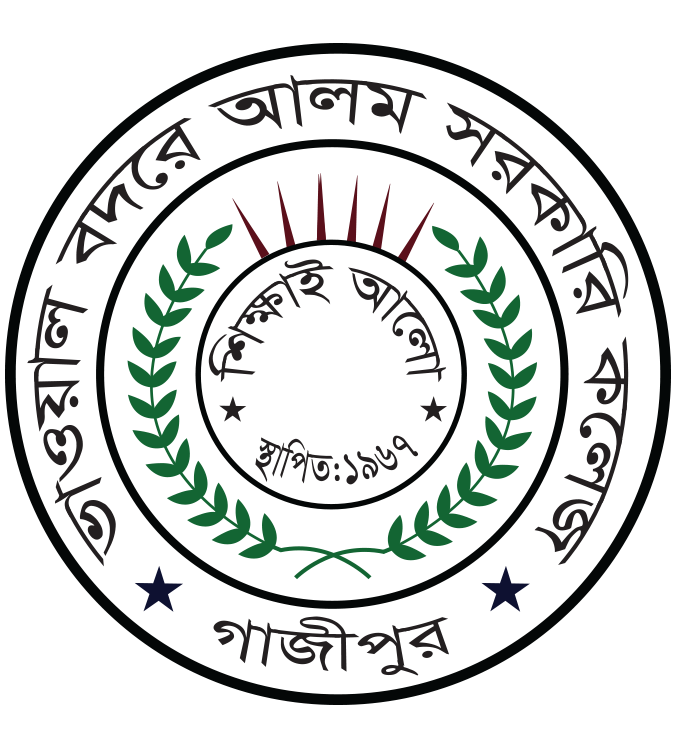
- Other name: Bhawal College
- Motto: Knowledge is Light
- Type: Government
- Established: July 1, 1967
- Founder: Badre Alam
- Academic affiliations: Dhaka Board, National University, Bangladesh
- Chairman: MD. Mazibur Rahman MP
- Principal: Sanoara Sultana
- Students: 19,000
- Undergraduates: BA, BSS, BBA, BSC
- Postgraduates: MA, MSS, MBA, MSC
- Location: Candana Chowrasta, Gazipur, 1702, Bangladesh; 23.9900°N 90.3745°E
- Campus: 24 acres (9.7 ha); City
- Language: Bangla
- Demonym: BBAGC
- Website: bbagc.edu.bd

Bhawal Badre Alam Government College is a government educational institution located in Gazipur District of Bangladesh, popularly known as Bhawal College. It is located along Dhaka-Tangail highway near Gazipur intersection. It was established in 1967 and was declared a government college in 1980. The founder of the college was Mr. Badre Alam and the first principal of the college was Mr. K. M. Abdus Salam

== History ==
The region of Bhawal, historically covered in Sal forests, was an educationally underserved area. In response, a group of local philanthropists and intellectuals felt the need to establish a college to spread the light of education. In 1967, they initiated the effort to found a college at Chandona Chowrasta in Joydebpur, chosen for its accessibility.

The college was officially established on 1 July 1967 as Bhawal College, primarily through the financial contributions of the philanthropist Badre Alam Sarkar. In his honor, the institution was named Bhawal Badre Alam College. It began by offering Higher Secondary Certificate (HSC) courses and was located on the north side of the Dhaka-Tangail highway, near the Chandona intersection in Gazipur.

Following its establishment, the student population grew significantly, leading to the introduction of undergraduate (Pass) courses. Many students and teachers from the college actively participated in the Bangladesh Liberation War in 1971, with several students martyred for the cause. After independence, the college's physical infrastructure expanded rapidly. As part of the government's nationalization program, the college was officially nationalized on 1 March 1980.

Responding to long-standing demands from students and the local community, the government introduced ten undergraduate (Honours) and postgraduate programs during the 1996-1997 academic session. Today, the college offers courses at the Higher Secondary, Undergraduate (Pass and Honours), and Postgraduate levels across arts, social sciences, science, and business faculties, serving approximately 19,000 students.

In December 2014 the government imposed section 144, curfew, on the grounds of Bhawal College after the Bangladesh Nationalist Party called a rally in support of their movement towards a snap election and the Bangladesh Chhatra League announced plans to stop that rally.

On 29 July 2017, the National University examination centre was shifted out of Bhawal College, without any prior notice, so that a local Awami League could hold a rally in Bhawal College.

== Administration ==
- Principal: Prof. Sanoara Sultana
- Vice-Principal: Prof. Md. Shawkat Ali
- Head Clerk: Md. Rakib Hossain

== Academic Information ==
The college offers Higher Secondary (HSC), Undergraduate (pass and honours), and Postgraduate programs under the National University of Bangladesh.

- College Code = 2125 (HSC)
- College Code = 5501 (National University)
- EIIN No = 109031(Education Ministry)

=== Higher Secondary Certificate (HSC) ===
- Science
- Humanities
- Business Studies

=== Undergraduate programs ===
The college offers bachelor's degrees (honours) in the following subjects:

- Faculty of Science:
  - Physics
  - Chemistry
  - Mathematics
  - Zoology
  - Botany
- Faculty of Arts:
  - Bengali
  - English
  - History
  - Islamic History & Culture
  - Islamic Studies
  - Philosophy
- Faculty of Social Sciences:
  - Economics
  - Political Science
- Faculty of Business Studies:
  - Accounting
  - Management

It also offers a bachelor of arts (pass) course.

=== Postgraduate programs ===
The college offers master's degrees in the following subjects:

- Bengali
- English
- History
- Islamic History & Culture
- Economics
- Political Science
- Accounting
- Management

== Student life and activities ==
The college has various clubs and organizations to support extracurricular activities, including:

- Bangladesh National Cadet Corps (BNCC)
- Rover Scouts
- Red Crescent Society
- Bhawal Badre Alam Govt. College Journalist Association

== Library ==
The college has a central library and seminar libraries for individual departments. According to official records, the library resources include:

- Central Library: 100 journals and 10 periodicals.
- Seminar Libraries: 500 books, 10 journals, and 5 periodicals.
