= Hasan Uddin Sarkar =

Bangladeshi politician

Member of Parliament for Gazipur-2
- In office 10 July 1986 – 6 December 1990
- Preceded by: Position established
- Succeeded by: M. A. Mannan

Personal details
- Born: 1947 or 1948 (age 77–78)
- Party: Jatiya Party; Bangladesh Nationalist Party

Hasan Uddin Sarkar is a Bangladesh Nationalist Party politician and a former Jatiya Sangsad member representing the Gazipur-2 constituency.

== Career ==
Sarkar was a labor leader in Tongi. He is a central member of Bangladesh Nationalist Party. He contested 1996 election in Tongi from the Jatiya Party. He was elected to Parliament from Tongi as a candidate of Bangladesh Nationalist Party.
