= Gazipur =

Gazipur গাজীপুর Joydebpur
- Metropolis
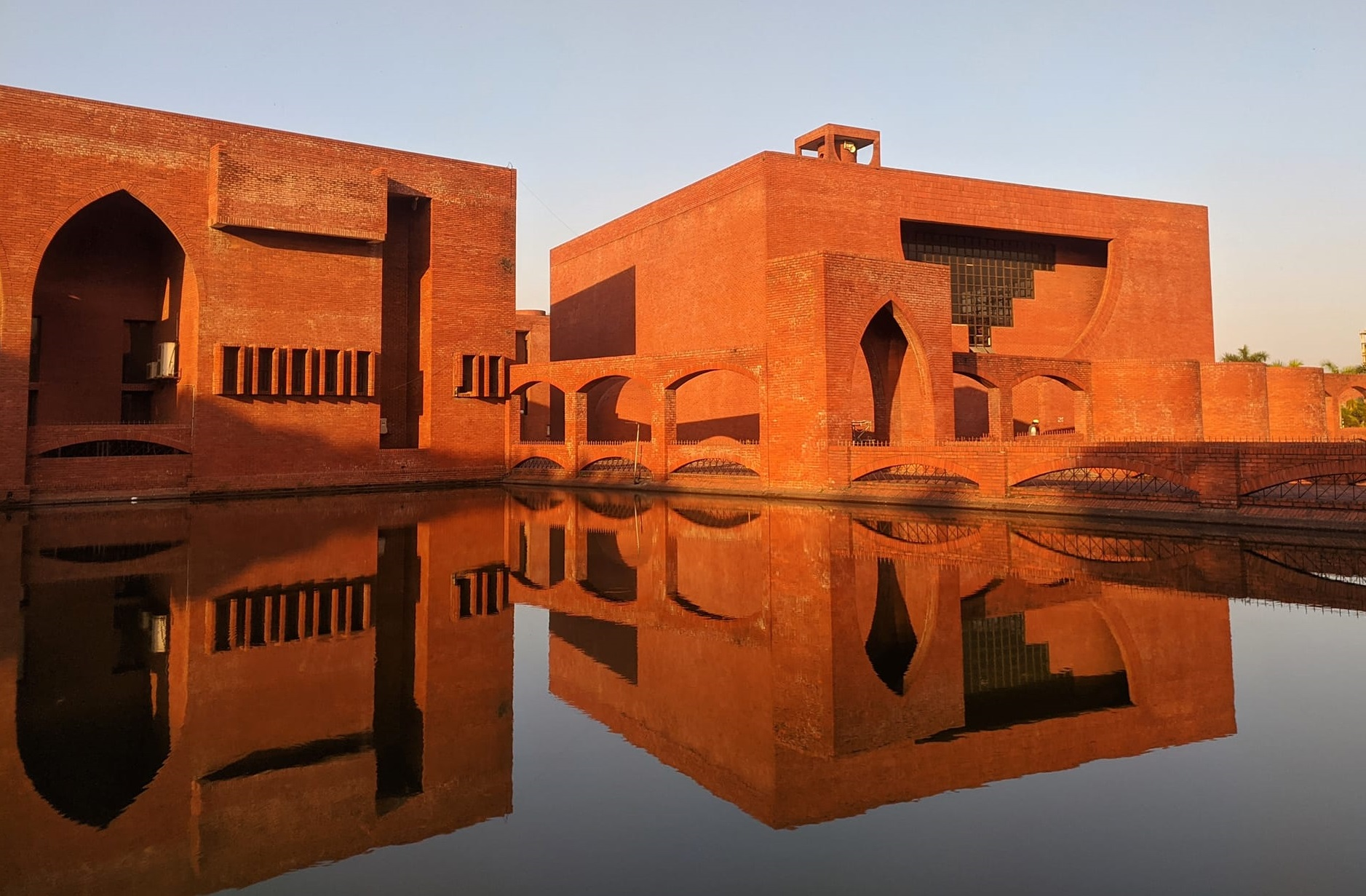
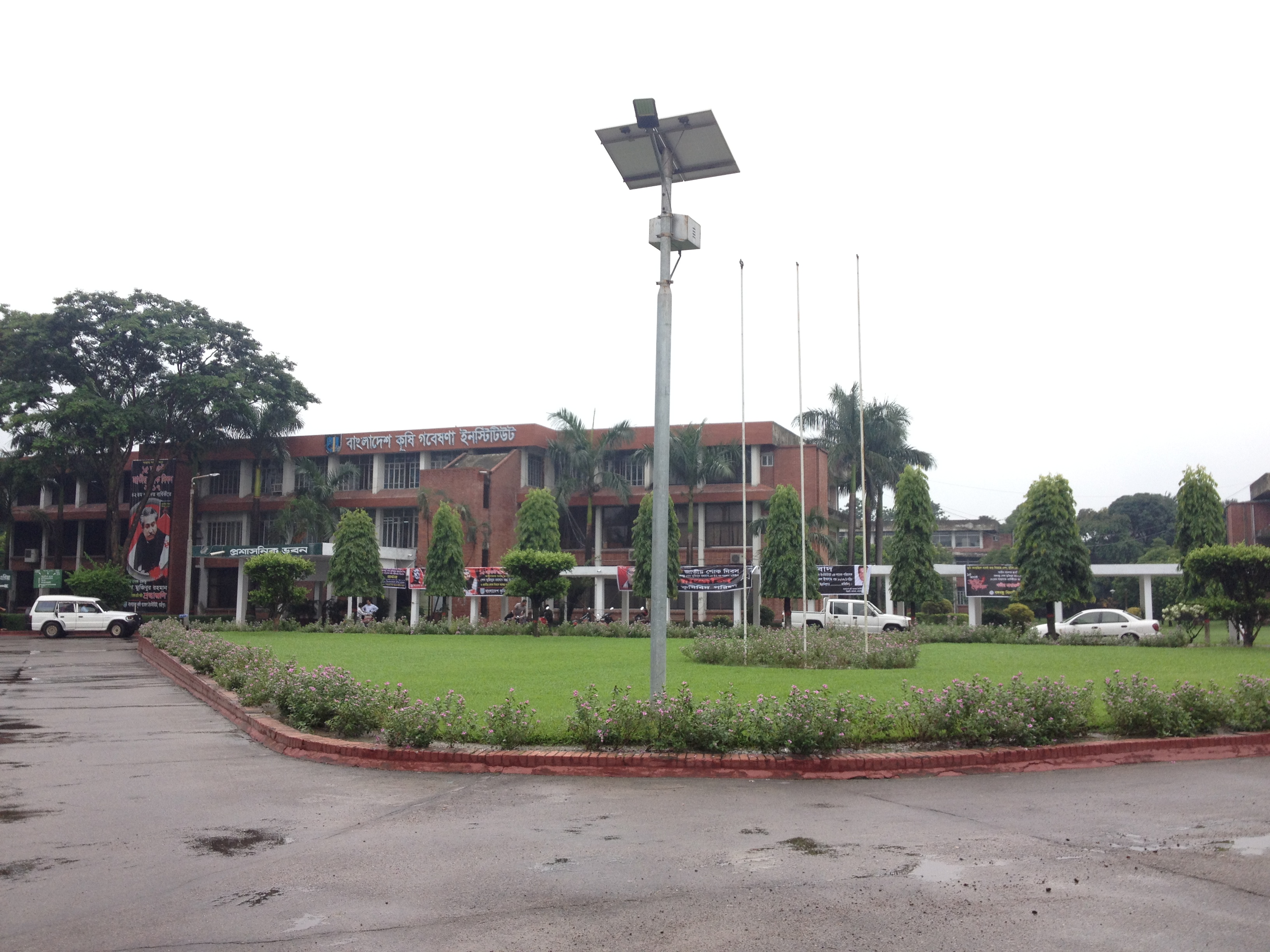
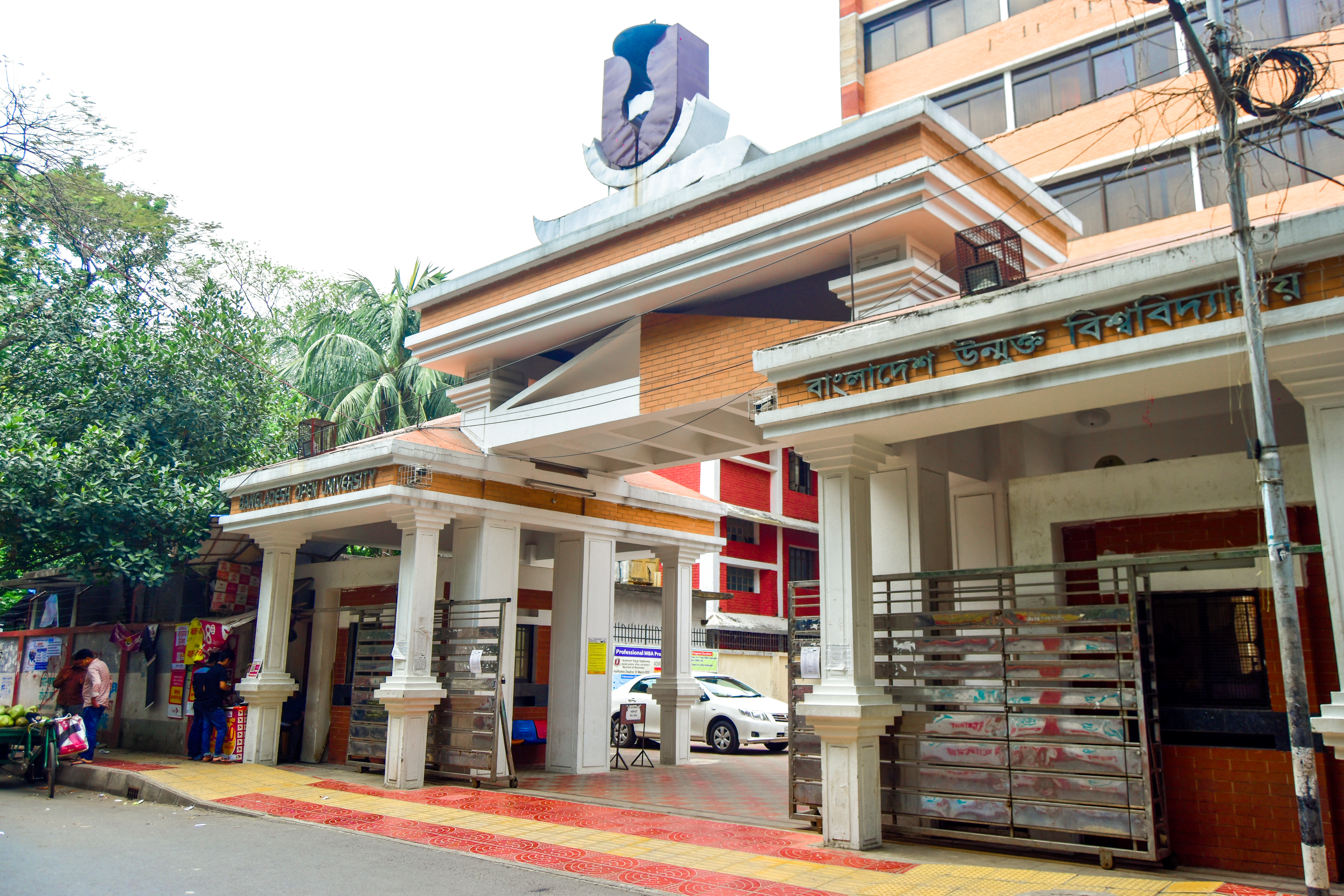
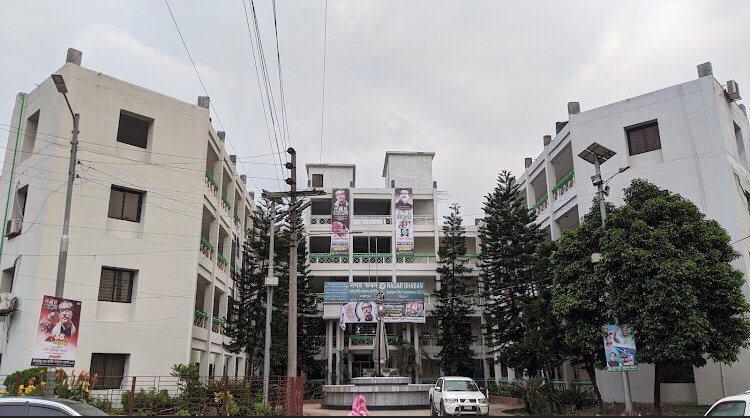
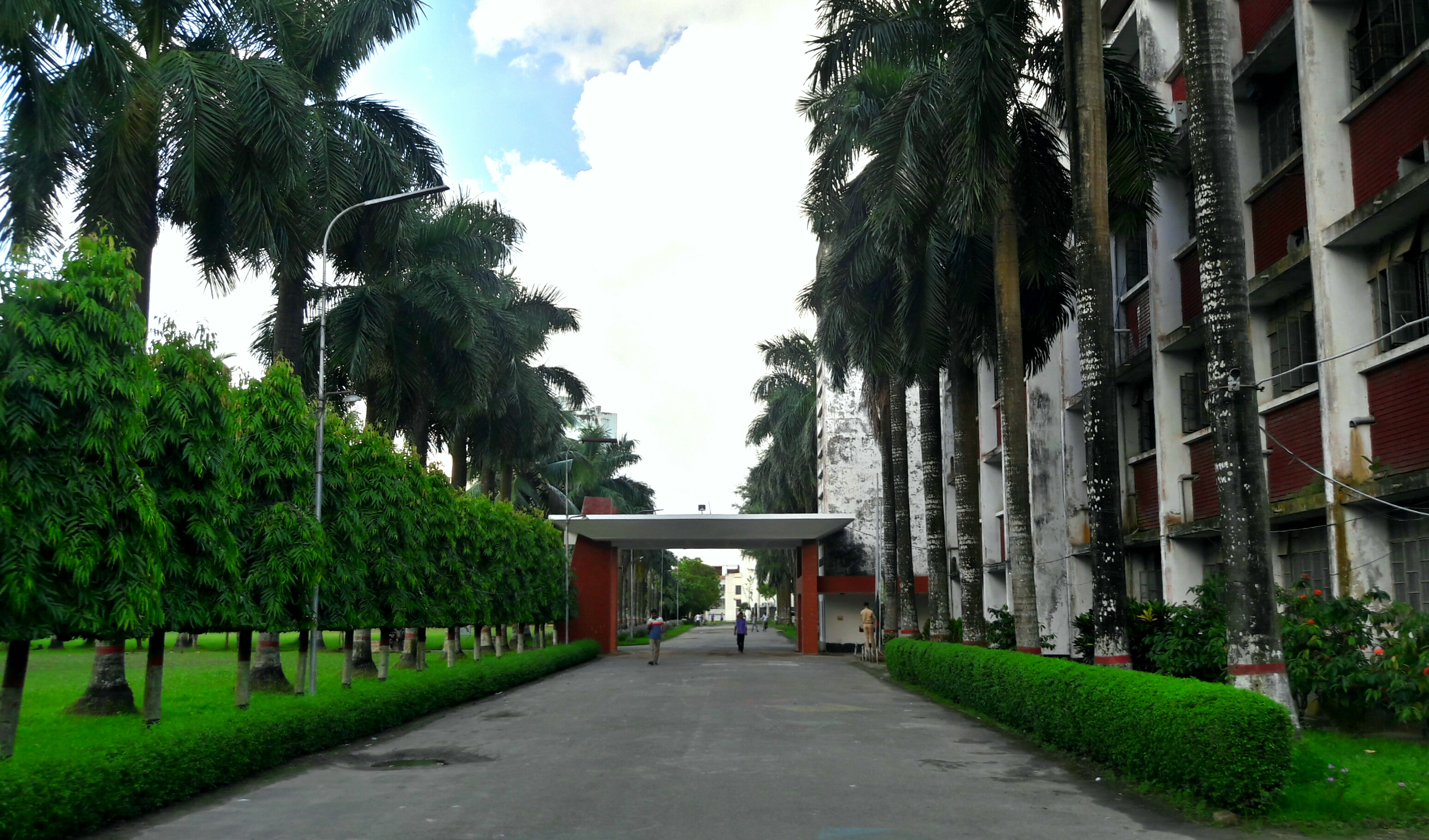
- From top: Islamic University of Technology, Bangladesh Agricultural Research Institute , Bangladesh Open University, Nagar Bhaban, Dhaka University of Engineering & Technology
- Interactive map of Gazipur
- Location in Dhaka Division Location in Bangladesh Gazipur (Asia) Gazipur (Earth)
- Coordinates: 23°59′20″N 90°22′30″E
- Country: Bangladesh
- Division: Dhaka Division
- District: Gazipur District
- Municipality: 1984
- Metropolitan city: 13 January 2013

Government
  - Type: Mayor–Council
  - Body: Gazipur City Corporation
  - Administrator: Md Shawkat Hossain Sarkar
  - City Council: 57 constituencies
  - Parliament: 3 constituencies

Area
  - Metro: 329.23 km^{2} (127.12 sq mi)
- Elevation: 18 m (59 ft)

Population (2022 census)
  - Metropolis: 2,677,715
  - Density: 8,134/km^{2} (21,070/sq mi)
  - City rank: 3rd in Bangladesh

Languages
  - Regional: Eastern Bengali
- Time zone: UTC+6 (Bangladesh Time)
- Postal code: 1700
- Calling code: +880 2
- GDP (2022): PPP ▲$8.5 billion Nominal ▲$3.2 billion
- HDI (2023): 0.701 high · 5th of 22
- Police: Gazipur Metropolitan Police
- Airport: Hazrat Shahjalal International Airport (nearby)
- Planning Authority: Gazipur Development Authority
- Water Supply and Sewerage Authority: Dhaka WASA
- National Calling Code: +880
- Calling Code: 0681
- UN/LOCODE: BD GZP
- Website: gazipur.gov.bd

Gazipur (Bengali: গাজীপুর) is the seat of Gazipur District and the second-largest city in Dhaka Division of Bangladesh. It is a major industrial city 25 km (16 mi) north of the national capital Dhaka. It is a hub for the textile industry in Bangladesh, with 75% of all garment industries situated there. It is also part of Greater Dhaka. With a population of 2,677,715, it is the third most-populous city in Bangladesh.

Since 2013, Gazipur has been governed by the Gazipur City Corporation, making it one of thirteen cities in Bangladesh that are administered by a city corporation.

== Geography ==
Mirzapur Union is situated in the north of the city, in the south Dhaka North City Corporation and Savar Yarpur Union. On the east side, there is Baria Union, Kaliganj Upazila, Gazipur and Sreepur Upazila, Gazipur. Mouchak and Maddhapara union of Kaliakair Upazila, and Shimulia and Damshona of Savar are at the west.

== Demographics ==
Population of Gazipur Municipality
2001	2011
222,801	913,061

Religions in Gazipur City Corp. (2022)
Religion	Percent
Islam	95.91%
Hinduism	3.83%
Other or not stated	0.26%

As of 2022 census results, Gazipur City Corporation had 836,875 households and a population of 2,677,715. 15.00% of the population was under 10 years of age. Gazipur had a literacy rate of 83.57% for those 7 years and older and a sex ratio of 112.61 males per 100 females.

As of the 2011 census, population of what would become Gazipur City corporation was 1,626,077 living in 398,164 households. Gazipur had a literacy rate of 67.39% and a sex ratio of 858 females per 1000 males.

== Administration ==
Ward map of Gazipur City Corporation

In 2013, a new local government entity called the Gazipur City Corporation was formed by merging the municipalities of Gazipur and Tongi, together with the rural areas of Bashan, Gachha, Kashimpur, Kayaltia, Konabari and Pubail. The area of the newly created city corporation is 329.53 km^{2} (127.23 sq mi). Gazipur consists of fifty seven wards including Uttar Chayabithi and 131 mahallas.

Gazipur is one of eleven cities of Bangladesh that are administered by a city corporation. Among the city corporations it is the youngest and largest in size.

== Health ==
There are many government and private hospitals and clinics in the city. Shaheed Tajuddin Ahmad Medical College is one of the bigger hospitals in Gazipur city and the only public medical college in the city. The city also has two private medical colleges with 36 private clinics and hospitals. The city also has 26 family planning clinics.

Air pollution levels in Gazipur are extremely unhealthy. In 2020, annual average PM2.5 air pollution in Gazipur stood at 94.6 μg/m^{3}, which is almost 18.9 times the World Health Organization PM2.5 Guideline (5 μg/m^{3}: set in September, 2021). These pollution levels are estimated to reduce the life expectancy of an average person living in Gazipur by 8.8 years.

== Notable people ==
- Tajuddin Ahmed, 1st prime minister of Bangladesh
- Ahsanullah Master, politician
- Meghnad Saha, scientist
- AKM Mozammel Haque, politician
- Simin Hossain Rimi, politician
- Sohel Taj, politician
- Hannan Shah, politician
- Faqueer Shahabuddin Ahmad, 2nd attorney general of Bangladesh

== See also ==
- Bishwa Ijtema
- List of cities in Bangladesh
- Gazipur Sadar Upazila
- Kapasia
- Dhaka University of Engineering & Technology, Gazipur
