= Shaheed Ahsan Ullah Master General Hospital =

Geography
- Location: Tongi, Gazipur, Bangladesh
- Coordinates: 23.8934°N 90.4022°E

Organisation
- Type: Government
- Patron: Ministry of Health

Services
- Beds: 250

History
- Former name: Tongi General Hospital
- Founded: 30 April 2017; 9 years ago

Shaheed Ahsan Ullah Master General Hospital (Bengali: শহীদ আহসান উল্লাহ মাস্টার জেনারেল হাসপাতাল) is a government hospital situated in Gazipur, Bangladesh.

== Location ==
The hospital is located on Station Road near Dhaka-Mymensingh Highway in Tongi town of Gazipur district.

== History ==
There was a hospital called Tongi Government Hospital in the past. A new hospital building was constructed on the land of that hospital later. In 2017, the government announced the name of the new hospital, named after Ahsanullah Master, in a notification about two months after the inauguration of the hospital. However, one year after the inauguration of the new building, the new building could not be used to serve the patients due to modern equipment, inadequate doctors and other problems. There are also many more complaints about the hospital. In 2020, the hospital was one of the COVID-19 test centers. On 25 April 2021, a hospital surgeon died of the coronavirus. It was one of the dengue dedicated hospitals in 2021. In 2022, three people were arrested for obstructing the submission of hospital tenders. On 7 September 2024, locals of the hospital area protested to revert the hospital's name to former.
