= Gazipur-2 =

Constituency of Bangladesh's Jatiya Sangsad

Coordinates: 24.00°N 90.43°E

- Constituency for the Jatiya Sangsad
- District: Gazipur District
- Division: Dhaka Division
- Electorate: 804,333 (2026)

Current constituency
- Created: 1984
- Party: Bangladesh Nationalist Party
- Member: M Manjurul Karim Roni
- ← 194 Gazipur-1 196 Gazipur-3 →

Gazipur-2 is a constituency represented in the Jatiya Sangsad (National Parliament) of Bangladesh since 2026 by M Manjurul Karim Roni of the Bangladesh Nationalist Party.

== Boundaries ==
The constituency encompasses Gazipur City Corporation wards 19 through 39 and 43 through 57, and Gazipur Cantonment.

== History ==
The constituency was created in 1984 from a Dhaka constituency when the former Dhaka District was split into six districts: Manikganj, Munshiganj, Dhaka, Gazipur, Narsingdi, and Narayanganj.

Ahead of the 2008 general election, the Election Commission redrew constituency boundaries to reflect population changes revealed by the 2001 Bangladesh census. The 2008 redistricting added a fifth seat to Gazipur District and altered the boundaries of Gazipur-2.

== Members of Parliament ==
Election	Member	Party
1986	Hasan Uddin Sarkar	Jatiya Party
1991	M. A. Mannan	Bangladesh Nationalist Party
1996	Ahsanullah Master	Awami League
2001	Ahsanullah Master	Awami League
2004 by-election	Zahid Ahsan Russel	Awami League
2008	Zahid Ahsan Russel	Awami League
2014	Zahid Ahsan Russel	Awami League
2018	Zahid Ahsan Russel	Awami League
2024	Zahid Ahsan Russel	Awami League
2026	M Manjurul Karim Roni	Bangladesh Nationalist Party

== Elections ==
=== Elections in the 2020s ===
General election 2026: Gazipur-2
Party	Candidate	Votes	%	±%
BNP	M Manjurul Karim Roni	188,606		
NCP	Ali Naser Khan	140,950		
IAB	Hanif Sarkar			
JP(E)	Md. Mahbub Alam			
Majority		47,656		
Turnout				
Registered electors		804,333		
BNP gain from AL				

=== Elections in the 2010s ===
Zahid Ahsan Russell was re-elected unopposed in the 2014 general election after opposition parties withdrew their candidacies in a boycott of the election.

=== Elections in the 2000s ===
General Election 2008: Gazipur-2
Party	Candidate	Votes	%	±%
AL	Zahid Ahsan Russell	264,710	64.3	
BNP	Hasan Uddin Sarkar	139,278	33.8	
IAB	Kazi Md. Shakhowat Ullah	3,849	0.9	
LDP	Nazim Uddin Ahmed	1,281	0.3	
CPB	Ziaul Kabir	1,016	0.2	
BTF	Syed Abu Daoud Mosnabi Haidar	899	0.2	
KSJL	Sheikh Md. Masudul Alam	246	0.1	
JUI	Mufti Nasir Uddin Khan	225	0.1	
BSD	Md. Abdul Kaiyum	189	0.0	
Majority		125,432	30.5	
Turnout		411,693	78.1	
AL hold				

Ahsanullah Master was assassinated on 7 May 2004. Zahid Ahsan Russell, his eldest son, was elected in an August by-election.

General Election 2001: Gazipur-2
Party	Candidate	Votes	%	±%
AL	Ahsanullah Master	159,125	42.7	+5.7
Independent	M. A. Mannan	87,691	23.5	N/A
BNP	Hasan Uddin Sarkar	85,781	23.0	−7.9
IJOF	Kazi Mahmud Hasan	38,200	10.2	N/A
BSD	Md. Usman Ali	1,355	0.4	N/A
Gano Forum	Rafiqul Islam	280	0.1	0.0
KSJL	Md. Masudul Alam	269	0.1	N/A
Jatiya Party (M)	Sheikh A. Majid	250	0.1	N/A
Majority		71,434	19.2	+18.6
Turnout		372,951	69.0	−6.9
AL hold				

=== Elections in the 1990s ===
General Election June 1996: Gazipur-2
Party	Candidate	Votes	%	±%
AL	Ahsanullah Master	94,732	37.0	0.0
BNP	M. A. Mannan	79,168	30.9	−23.5
JP(E)	Hasan Uddin Sarkar	71,528	27.9	+24.3
Jamaat	Md. Abul Hasem	5,543	2.2	+0.5
IOJ	Md. Nur Hossain Nurani	1,343	0.5	N/A
Zaker Party	Md. Hafiz Uddin Sarkar	1,175	0.5	−0.8
Independent	Md. Shahajuddin Sarkar	692	0.3	N/A
Bangladesh Samajtantrik Dal (Khalekuzzaman)	Osman Ali	538	0.2	−0.7
Independent	Abu Bakar Siddique	378	0.1	N/A
BKA	Md. Ramjan Ali	291	0.1	−0.2
Gano Forum	Samsunnahar Bhuiyan	263	0.1	N/A
Bangladesh Janata Party	Md. Abul Kalam Azad Chowdhury	230	0.1	N/A
Jatiya Samajtantrik Dal-JSD	Md. Saru Mian	91	0.0	N/A
Independent	Md. Ataur Rahman	82	0.0	N/A
Independent	Nasir Uddin Sarkar	71	0.0	N/A
Independent	Md. Laiz Uddin Molla	62	0.0	N/A
Majority		15,564	0.6	−16.8
Turnout		256,187	75.9	+14.1
AL gain from BNP				

General Election 1991: Gazipur-2
Party	Candidate	Votes	%	±%
BNP	M. A. Mannan	97,597	54.4	
AL	AKM Mojammel Haq	66,418	37.0	
JP(E)	Feroz Khah	6,444	3.6	
Jamaat	Abu Sadek Md. Najibullah	3,098	1.7	
Zaker Party	Hafiz Uddin Sarkar	2,404	1.3	
Bangladesh Samajtantrik Dal (Khalekuzzaman)	Osman Ali	1,675	0.9	
WPB	Nurul Anwar	769	0.4	
JSD	Azmat Ali	583	0.3	
BKA	Shihab Uddin	563	0.3	
Majority		31,179	17.4	
Turnout		179,551	61.8	
BNP gain from JP(E)				
