= Tongi Junction railway station =

Railway station in Gazipur, Bangladesh

Tongi Junction টঙ্গী জংশন
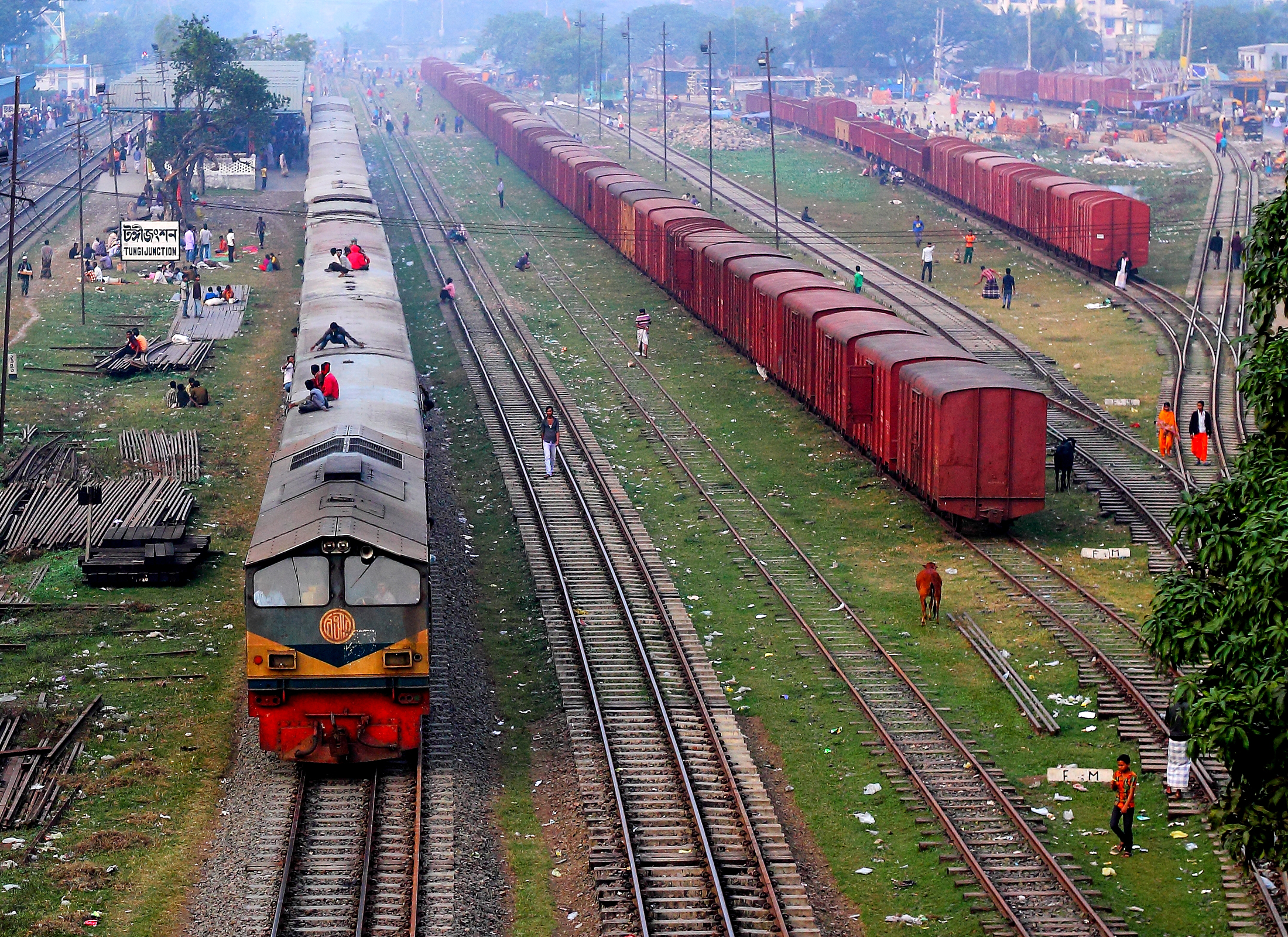
- Tongi Junction Railway Station, Gazipur

General information
- Location: Tongi, Gazipur District; Bangladesh
- Coordinates: 23°53′55″N 90°24′30″E
- Owner: Bangladesh Railway
- Lines: Narayanganj–Bahadurabad Ghat line Tongi–Bhairab–Akhaura line Tongi–Manikganj–Paturia Ghat line
- Platforms: 3
- Tracks: Dual Gauge

Construction
- Structure type: Standard (on ground station)

Other information
- Status: Functioning
- Station code: TGI
- Zone(s): East Zone
- Division(s): Dhaka

History
- Opened: 1885
- Former names: Assam Bengal Railway (1885–1947); Pakistan Eastern Railway (1947–1971)

Services
Preceding station	Bangladesh Railway	Following station
Dhaka Airport towards Narayanganj	Narayanganj–Bahadurabad Ghat	Dhirasram towards Bahadurabad Ghat
Terminus	Tongi–Bhairab–Akhaura	Pubail towards Akhaura Junction
Location

Tongi Junction Railway Station is a railway station in Bangladesh located in Tongi, Gazipur District. It is a station between Dhirashram and Dhaka Airport railway station. It is about 5 km north of the airport station and about 12 km south of Joydebpur. The station is served by two dual gauge lines and two platforms. Tongi–Bhairab–Akhaura line starts from this station. During the Bishwa Ijtema, it becomes a hub of communication and additional trains ply the station.

== History ==
In 1885 the Dhaka State Railway opened a 144 km railway line from Narayanganj to Mymensingh and the Tongi railway station was established at the same time. In 2011, construction of 3rd and 4th lines to upgrade Dhaka–Tongi two-track railway line to four-track railway line was planned and in 2012 it was approved by Executive Committee of the National Economic Council, but it was not completed even in 2018. Dhaka-Tongi demo train started in 2014.

== Criticism ==
The area around the Tongi–Joydebpur line, including the Tongi railway station, is known as a haven for drug dealers and robbers.
