= Tongi–Manikganj–Paturia Ghat line =

Proposed railway line in Bangladesh

Overview
- Status: Proposed
- Owner: Bangladesh Railway
- Locale: Bangladesh
- Termini: Tongi Junction railway station; Paturia Ghat railway station

Service
- Type: Railway line
- Operator(s): East Zone

Technical
- Line length: 80 km
- Track gauge: Dual gauge

Tongi–Manikganj–Paturia Ghat line is a proposed railway line between Tongi and Paturia Ghat, Manikganj District.

== History ==
The residents of Manikganj district have been appealing to the government for establishing rail link between Manikganj district and Dhaka for quite some time. In 2019, Bangladesh Railway decided to check the feasibility of this railway project and held several meetings for this purpose. In 2021, the Bangladesh government included this railway line in the priority project. In April 2022, the proposed project was recommended to the Planning Commission to approve the feasibility study. According to the proposal of the Ministry of Railways, the railway line will start from Tongi and enter Manikganj District and pass through Manikganj to Paturia Ghat. Besides, a branch line of this railway line will go up to Keraniganj railway station via Nimtoli of Keraniganj Upazila.
