= Mozida Government High School =

School in Gazipur, Bangladesh

Coordinates: 23.9178°N 90.3996°E

Location
- Tongi, Gazipur Sadar, Gazipur District, Dhaka Division; Bangladesh

Information
- Established: 1988; 37 years ago

Mazida Government High School is the only government high school in Tongi, Gazipur Sadar Upazila, Gazipur District, Bangladesh. The school was built in 1988.
