= Dhirasram railway station =

Railway station in Gazipur District, Bangladesh

Dhirasram ধীরাশ্রম
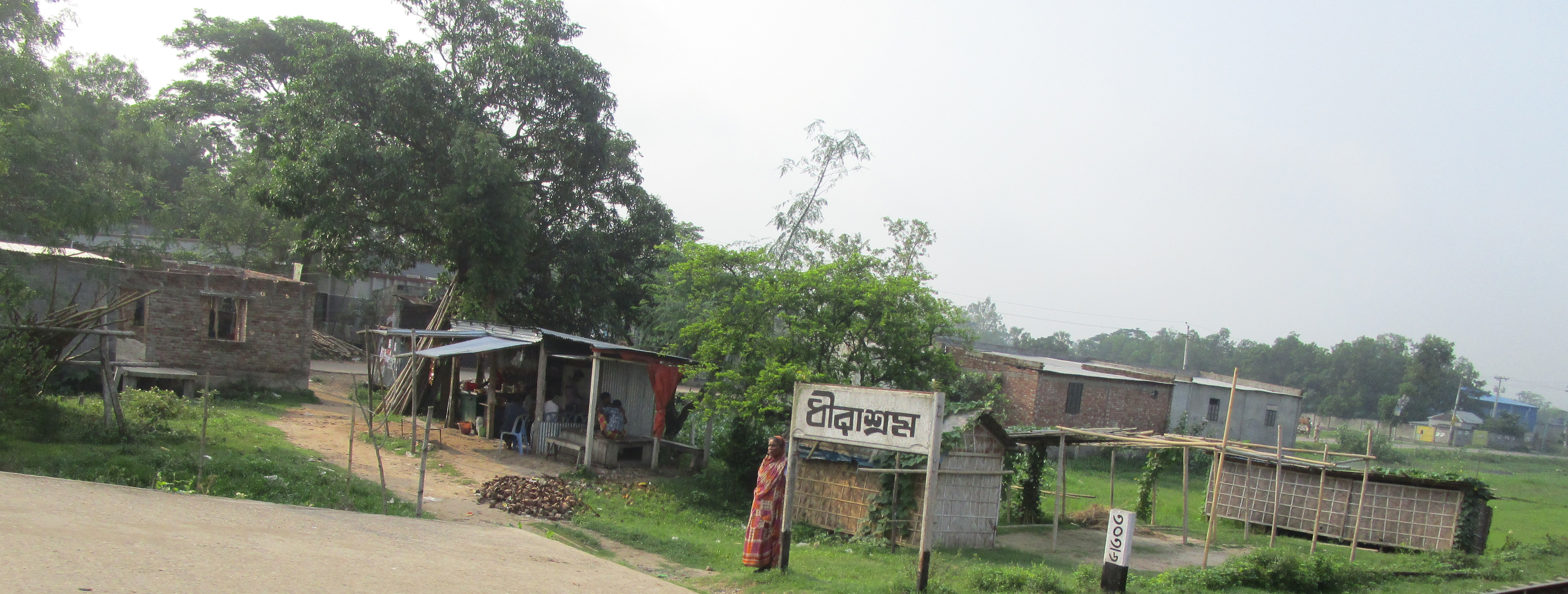

General information
- Location: Gazipur District; Bangladesh
- Coordinates: 23°57′32″N 90°24′56″E
- Owner: Bangladesh Railway
- Line: Narayanganj–Bahadurabad Ghat line
- Tracks: Dual Gauge

Construction
- Structure type: Standard (on ground station)

Other information
- Status: Functioning
- Station code: DRM
- Zone(s): East Zone
- Division(s): Dhaka

History
- Opened: 1885
- Former names: Assam Bengal Railway (1885–1947); Pakistan Eastern Railway (1947–1971)

Services
| Preceding station | Bangladesh Railway | Following station |
|---|---|---|
| Tongi Junction towards Narayanganj | Narayanganj–Bahadurabad Ghat transfer at Tongi Junction | Joydebpur Junction towards Bahadurabad Ghat |
Location

Dhirasram Railway Station is a railway station located in the metropolis of Gazipur District of Dhaka Division, Bangladesh.

== History ==
The demand for jute was increasing all over the world towards the end of the 19th century. To meet that growing demand, there was a need for better communication system than the existing communication system to supply jute from Eastern Bengal to Port of Kolkata. Therefore, in 1885 a 144 km wide meter gauge railway line named Dhaka State Railway was constructed to bring raw jute to Kolkata mainly by river which connects Mymensingh with Narayanganj. Gandaria railway station was built as part of the project during the construction of Narayanganj–Bahadurabad Ghat line. At that time Dhirasram railway station was built as a station of this line. In 2003, an inland container depot was planned to be constructed at this railway station after shifting it from Kamalapur railway station. 100 acres of land was acquired in the railway station area which is located near Demra–Joydebpur Eastern Bypass for the implementation of the project. In 2007, the construction cost of the new inland container depot was fixed at ৳450 crore. In 2019, the government contracted DP World to build it under a public private partnership, after failing to find investors to implement the project.
