= Ahsanullah Master =

Bangladeshi politician

- আহসানউল্লাহ মাস্টার

Member of Bangladesh Parliament
- In office 14 July 1996 – 7 May 2004
- Preceded by: M. A. Mannan
- Succeeded by: Zahid Ahsan Russell
- Constituency: Gazipur-2

Personal details
- Born: 9 November 1950
- Died: 7 May 2004 (aged 53) Gazipur, Bangladesh
- Party: Bangladesh Awami League
- Children: 3, including Zahid Ahsan Russell
- Education: University of Dhaka
- Awards: Independence Award (2021)

Ahsanullah Master (9 November 1950 – 7 May 2004) was a Bangladesh Awami League politician and a Jatiya Sangsad member from the Gazipur-2 constituency. He was a notable trade union leader who was assassinated in May 2004. He was awarded Independence Award in 2021 posthumously.

== Early life and career ==
Master completed his bachelor's from the University of Dhaka and started his career in teaching profession. During 1983–1988, he led the Pubail Union Parishad in the Gazipur District. He later served as the chairman of Gazipur Upazila Council.

Master was a member of Mukti Bahini and fought in the Bangladesh Liberation War. He was elected to parliament form Gazipur-2 constituency in 1996 and 2001.

== Death ==
Master was shot dead in a conference along with Omar Faruq Ratan in Tongi, Gazipur on 7 May 2004.

In April 2005, Dhaka Speedy Trial Tribunal-1 convicted Nurul Islam Sarkar, a leader of Bangladesh Jatiotabadi Jubo Dal, the youth wing of the Bangladesh Nationalist Party, and 27 others for the killing, quoting "the lawmaker was killed out of political vindictiveness and for establishing supremacy in the locality". Among the 28 convicted, the court sentenced 22 to death and 6 to life term imprisonment. In June 2016, the High Court, on appeals, confirmed the death penalty of 6, commuted 7 others to life imprisonment, upheld life term sentence of 2 and acquitted 11 of the charges against them. The other 2 had died during the trial.

== Personal life ==
Master's son Zahid Ahsan Russell was the Jatiya Sangsad member from the same Gazipur-2 constituency after Master's death.
