= M. E. H. Arif College =

College in Bangladesh

Coordinates: 24.0095°N 90.3262°E

M. E. H. Arif College
- এম.ই.এইচ আরিফ কলেজ
- কোনাবাড়ি Gazipur City, Bangladesh

Information
- School type: Private Secondary and Higher Secondary College
- Motto: " ভালো মানুষ হওয়ার জন্য এসো "
- Established: 2001
- Founder: Mohammad Emarat Hossain
- Status: Active
- School board: Board of Intermediate and Secondary Education, Dhaka
- School district: Gazipur
- School code: 109043
- President: Mohammad Emarat Hossain
- Principal: Mohammad Nazrul Islam
- Headmaster: Mohammad Abul Kashem
- Years offered: 14
- Primary years taught: Play to 5th Grade
- Secondary years taught: 6th - 10th Grade and hsc
- Gender: All
- Hours in school day: 9:00 am to 03:20 pm
- Campus type: Urban
- Website: arifcollege.edu.bd

M. E. H. Arif College (Bengali: এম.ই.এইচ আরিফ কলেজ) is a higher secondary school located at Konabari, Gazipur Sadar Upazila, Gazipur District, Bangladesh. It offers 7 years (Play-Class Five) primary education (Under Great Mak Primary School), 5 years secondary education, and 2 years higher secondary education. It has about 6,000 students in this college.

This college is marked as top 10 institution in Primary School Certificate (PSC) Examination, Junior School Certificate (JSC) Examination and Secondary School Certificate (SSC) Examination since last 10 years in Gazipur District. In 2021,9 students got chance into medical College. This college achieved 2nd position in 2014. In 2013, this college also achieved 2nd position in Gazipur district. It also marked as 2nd education institution in Dhaka Board based on percentage of pass in the year 2007
