= Gazipur Safari Park =

Safari park in Gazipur, Bangladesh

Coordinates: 24.1716663°N 90.3926611°E

Gazipur Safari Park গাজীপুর সাফারি পার্ক
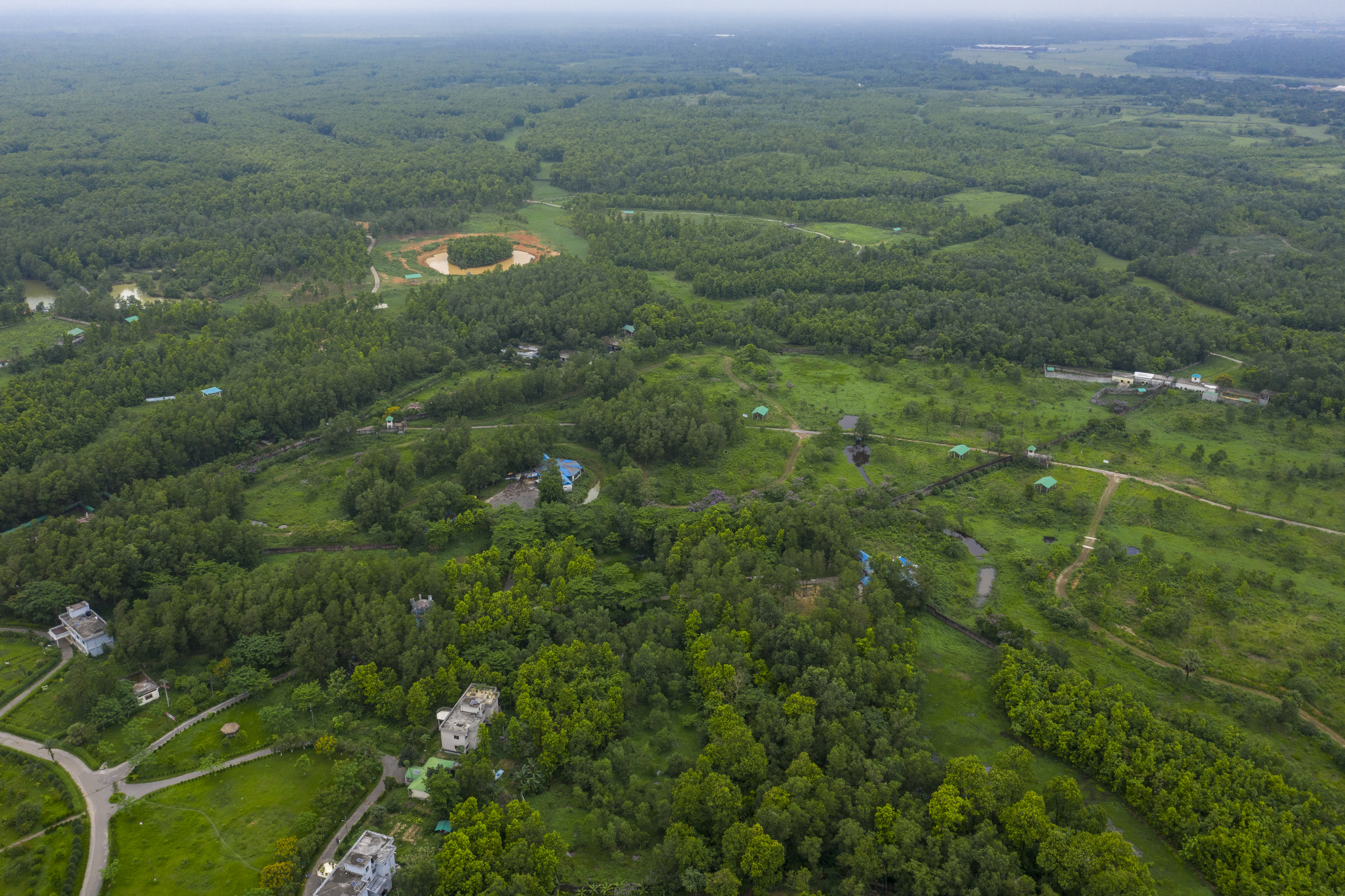
- Interactive map of Gazipur Safari Park গাজীপুর সাফারি পার্ক
- Date opened: October 31, 2013; 12 years ago
- Location: Gazipur, Bangladesh
- Land area: 4,909 acres (1,987 ha)
- No. of animals: 3000
- No. of species: 47
- Owner: Forest Department of Bangladesh
- Website: www.safariparkgazipur.info.bd

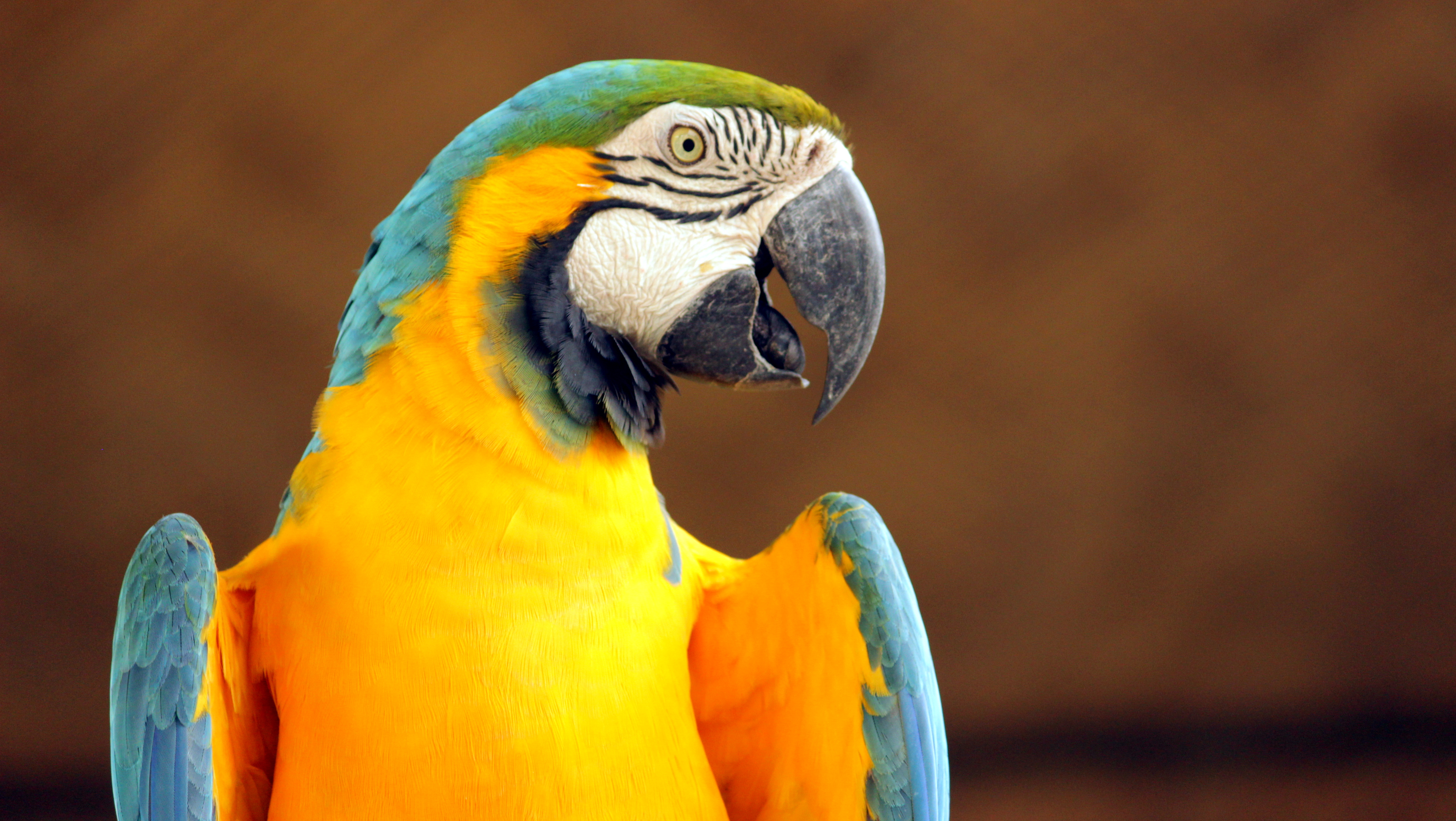
Macaw at Gazipur Safari Park

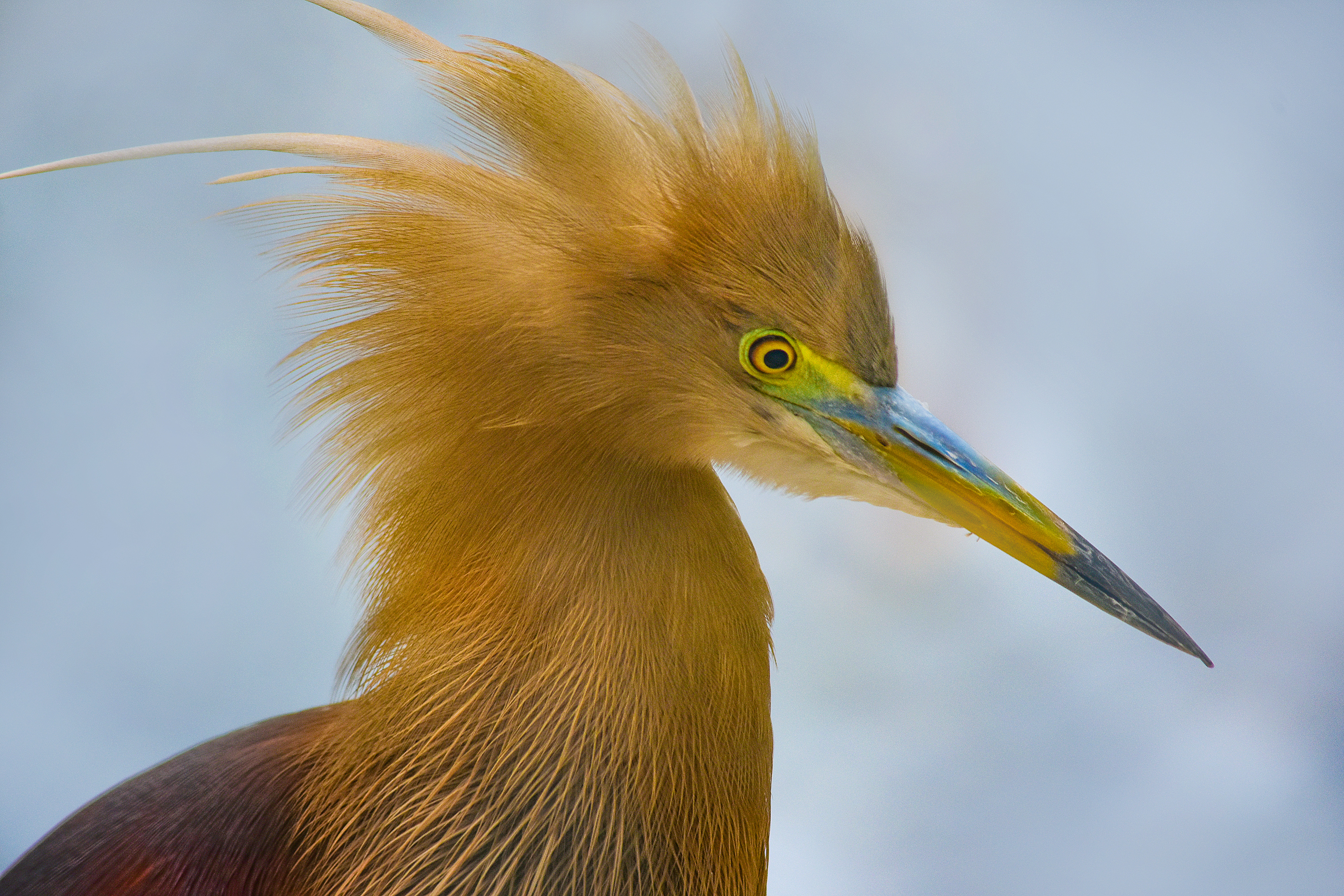
Pond Heron

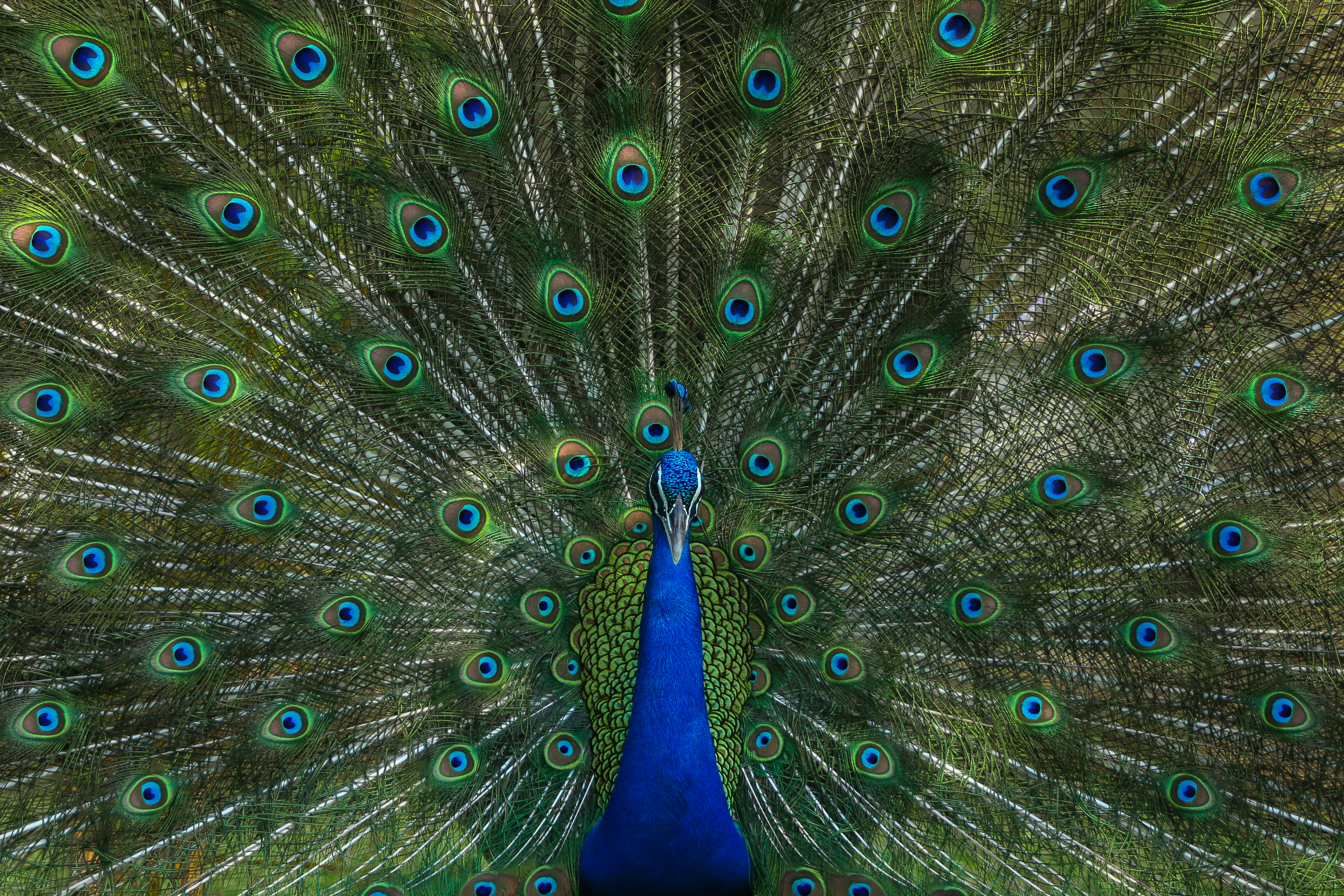
Blue peacock

Gazipur Safari Park or Safari Park, Gazipur is a safari park in Gazipur, Bangladesh. This safari park is spread over 3,810 acres (1,540 ha) of Sal Forest which makes it one of the largest safari parks in the world and the largest in Asia. It was inaugurated on October 31, 2013. It is located about 40 km (25 mi) north of Bangladesh's capital city Dhaka near the Dhaka — Mymensingh Highway.

The park is divided into 6 major sections: Core Safari, Safari Kingdom, Biodiversity Park, Extensive Asian Safari Park, Bangabandhu Square & Children's Park.

After the July Revolution and the depose of Sheikh Hasina's oppressive rule in Bangladesh, the naming of the park has been the subject of constant opposition since it bore the name of Sheikh Mujibur Rahman, as it was formerly known as Sheikh Mujib Safari Park. The nameplate at the main gate of the park and a few other areas were subjected to vandalism. The name of the park was then changed following the revolution and the park has been opened for visitors since 15 November 2024.

== Animals ==
This safari park is home to 47 species of animals and birds out of which 28 species are local. The total population of animals and birds is about 3000. Most notable are:

- Tiger
- Lion
- Elephant
- Zebra
- Deer
- Swan
- Butterfly
- Duck
- Snake
- Bear
- Peafowl
- Nilgai
- Hippopotamus
- Alligator
- Kangaroo
- Gharial

== Core Safari ==
Only authorized buses can enter into this zone. But visitors can see the animals in natural environment while sitting inside the bus. This zone is made up with 1,335 acres (540 ha) of land in which 20 acres (8.1 ha) of land for tiger, 21 acres (8.5 ha) of land for lion, 8.50 acres (3.44 ha) of land for black bear, 8 acres (3.2 ha) of land for African cheetah, 81.50 acres (32.98 ha) of land for chital, 80 acres (32 ha) of land for gaur, 105 acres (42 ha) of land for elephant, 35 acres (14 ha) of land for hippo, 22 acres (8.9 ha) of land for deer, 25 acres (10 ha) of land for nilgai, 407 acres (165 ha) of land for buffalo and 290 acres (120 ha) of land for African safari.

== Reception ==
The Daily Star called the Safari Park "one of the best latest tourist additions". The park attracts regular visitors from Dhaka.

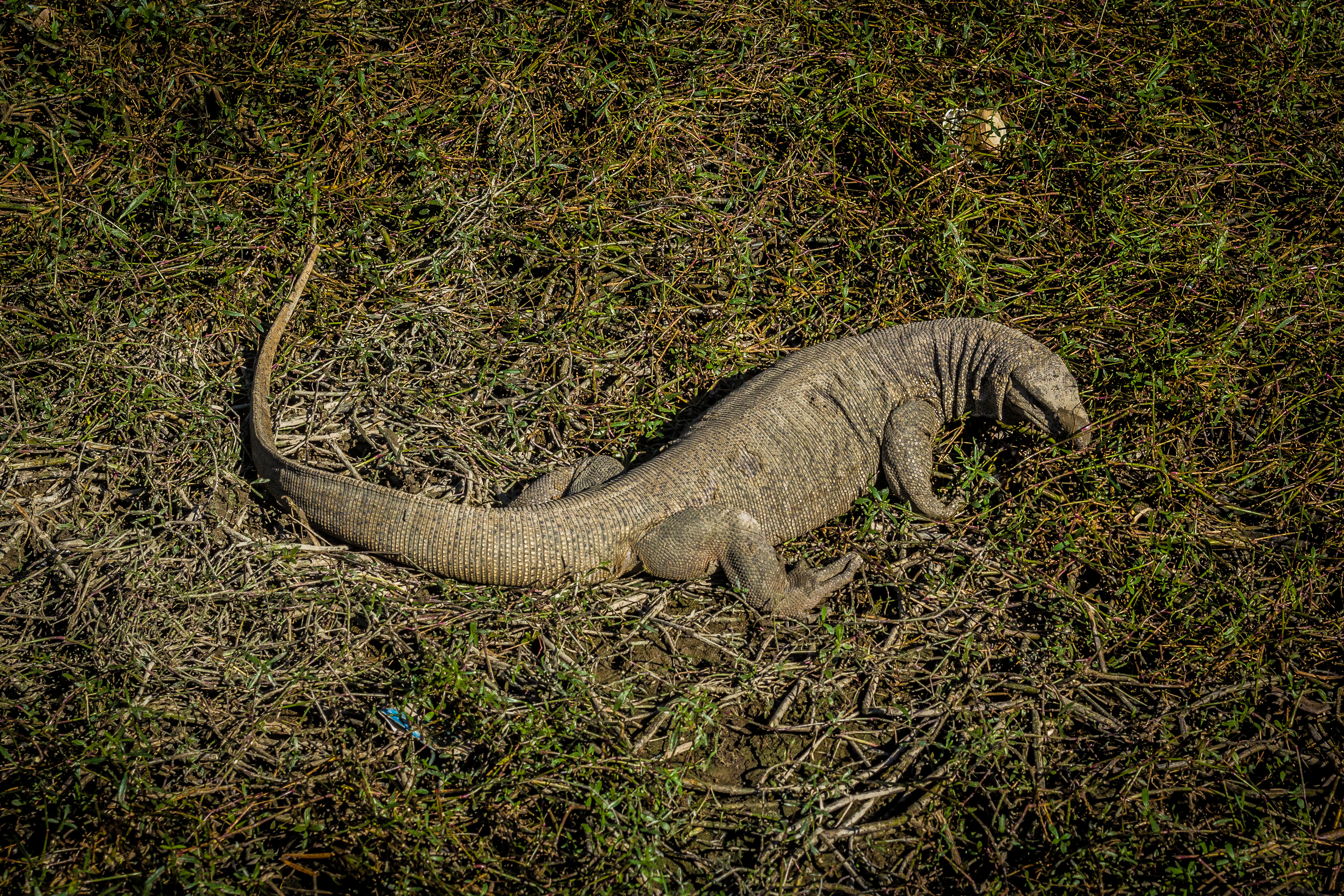
Water Monitor, Gazipur Safari Park
