= Zahid Ahsan Russel =

Former Bangladeshi politician

- জাহিদ আহসান রাসেল
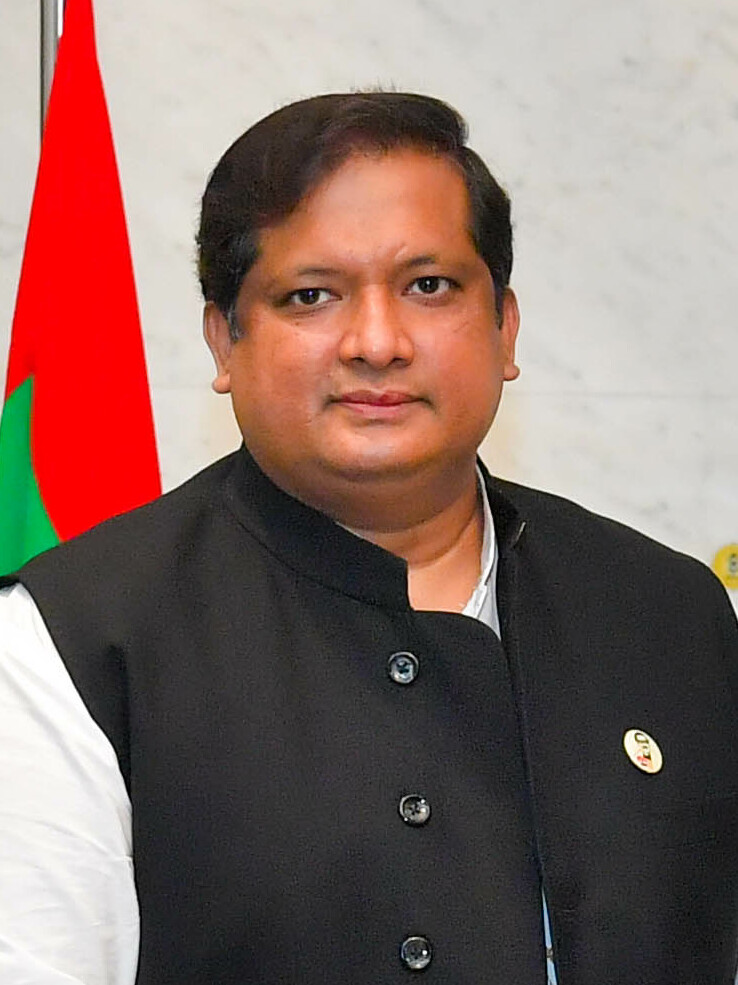
- Russel in 2021

Minister of State for Youth and Sports
- In office 7 January 2019 – 11 January 2024
- Prime Minister: Sheikh Hasina
- Preceded by: Biren Sikder
- Succeeded by: Aminul Haque

Member of the Bangladesh Parliament for Gazipur-2
- In office 2 August 2004 – 6 August 2024
- Preceded by: Ahsanullah Master (His Father)
- Succeeded by: M Manjurul Karim Roni

Personal details
- Born: 1 January 1978 (age 48) Gazipur, Bangladesh
- Party: Bangladesh Awami League
- Parent: Ahsanullah Master (father)
- Education: University of Wolverhampton

Md. Zahid Ahsan Russel (born 1 January 1978) is a Bangladesh Awami League politician and a former Jatiya Sangsad member representing the Gazipur-2 constituency. He served as State Minister of Youth and Sports from 2019 to 2024. His father, Ahsanullah Master, was a former representative of the same constituency.

== Birth and education ==
Russel was born on 1 January 1978 to Ahsanullah Master and mother Farida Ahsan in Noagaon area under the Tongi Police Station of Gazipur District. His permanent residence is in the village of Hyderabad in Gazipur. He was married to Khadiza Russel. Ahsanullah was elected a member of the parliament from Bangladesh Awami League in Gazipur-2. Russel earned his B.S.S. degree. He is currently studying LLB Honors at University of Wolverhampton in the UK.

== Political career ==
After his father's assassination, Russel was elected the youngest member of the parliament from by-election. He also worked in the eighth parliament as member of the Standing Committee on Ministry of Industries. He was elected parliament member by getting the 2nd highest votes by the nomination of Bangladesh Awami League in the 9th parliamentary election on 29 December 2008. In the ninth parliament, He was nominated as the chairman of the Standing Committee on the Ministry of Youth and Sports. He was also a member of the Library Committee as well as a member of the Security Committee of the National Parliament. He is currently a syndicate member of Bangabandhu Sheikh Mujibur Rahman Agricultural University and formerly a Senate member of Jahangirnagar University. He was elected as a Member of the Parliament for third time by the nomination of Bangladesh Awami League in the 10th parliamentary elections in January 2014 and again nominated as the Chairman of the Standing Committee on the Ministry of Youth and Sports. He has elected to the parliament for the fourth time in December 2019 and took over the charge of State Minister for the Ministry of Youth and Sports of the government.

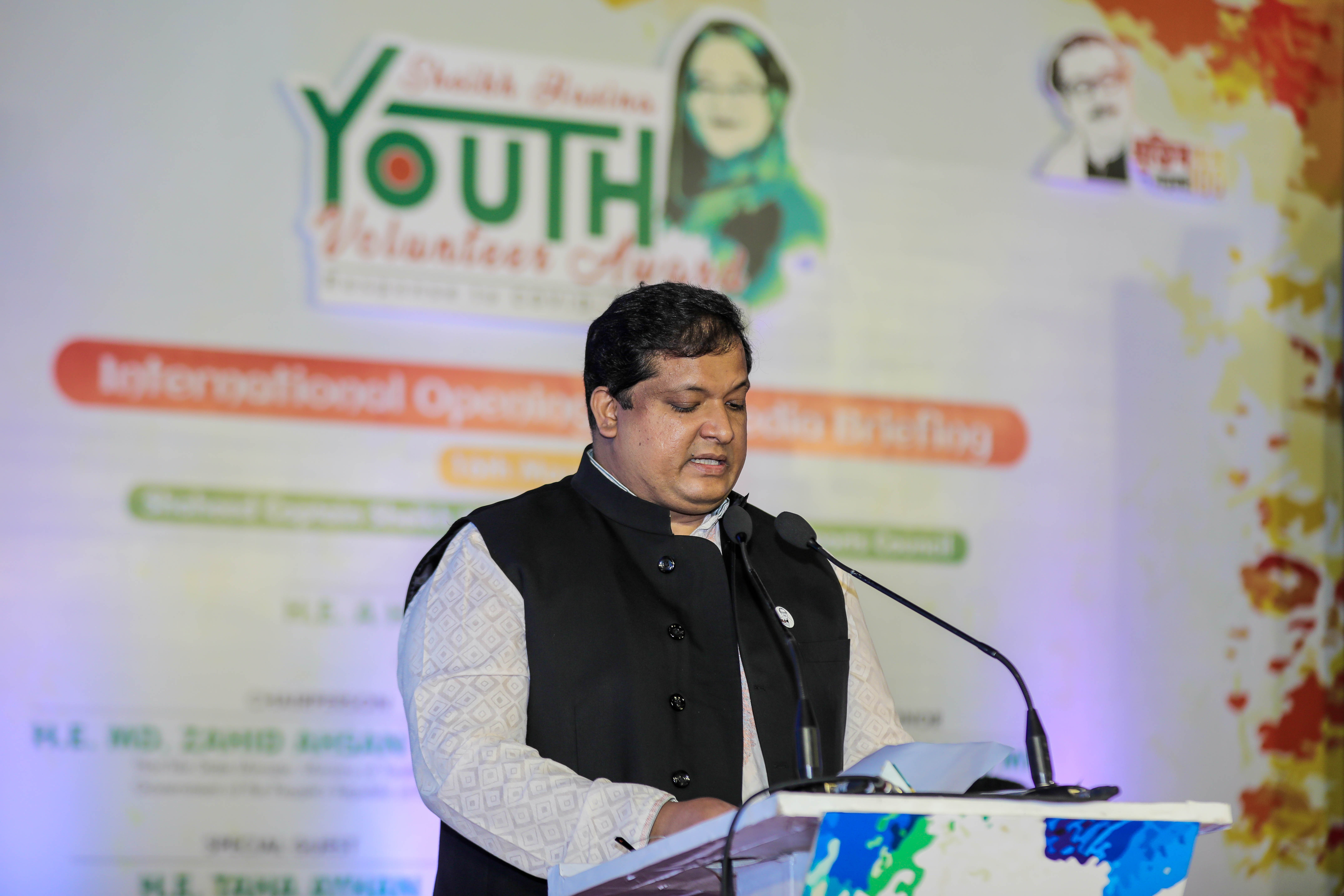
Zahid Ahsan Russel, MP is providing speech in Sheikh Hasina Youth Volunteer Award.

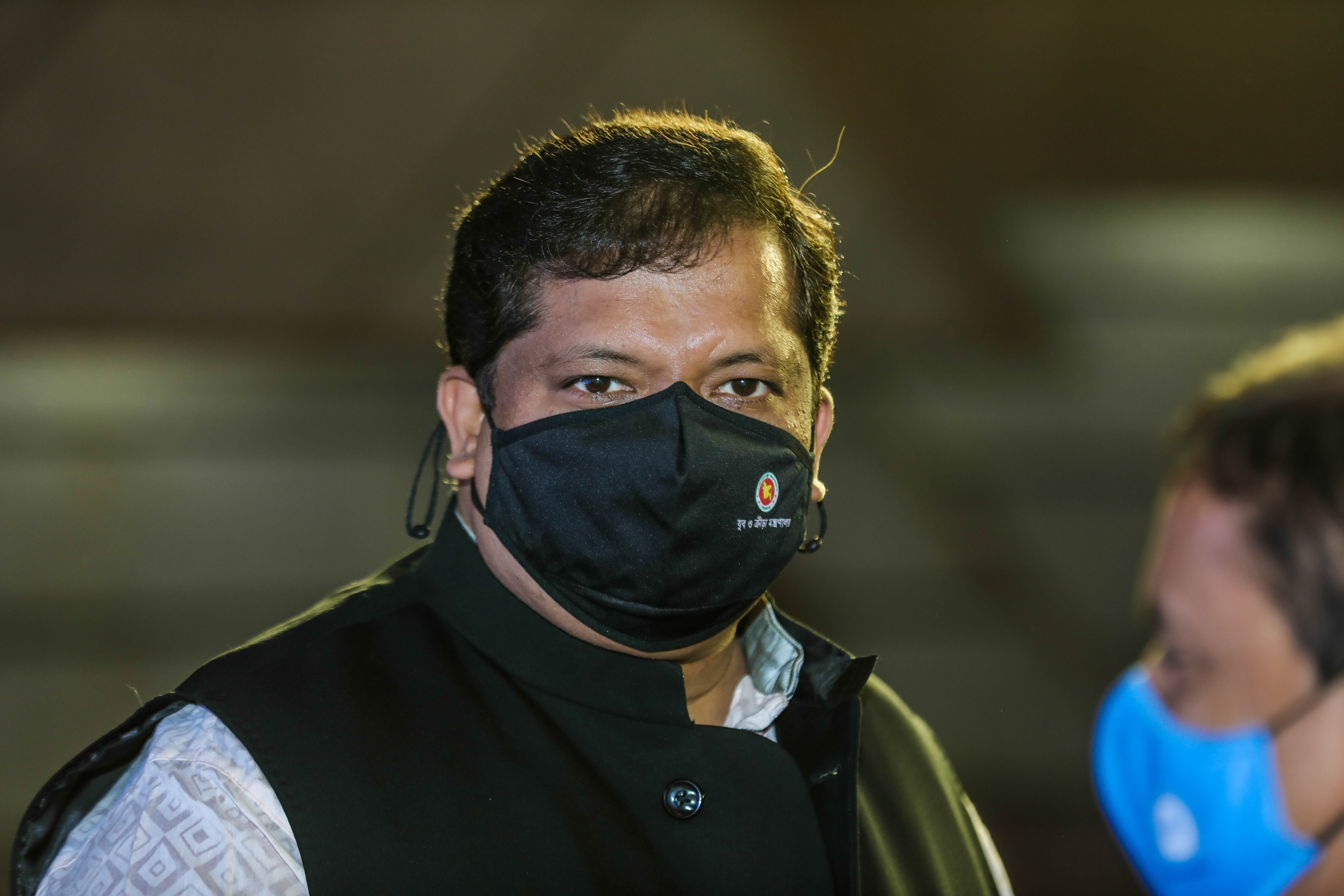
Zahid Ahsan Russel, MP

== Personal life ==
Russel already established many schools and colleges. Beside these, he has been playing a vital role in the development activities of various organizations including construction of roads, bridges, culverts, hospitals, schools, colleges, madrasa, mosques, temples, churches and graveyards. He has built a new stadium in Tongi named Shahid Ahsan Ullah Master Stadium and renovated Shahid Barkat Stadium in Gazipur.
