= M Manjurul Karim Roni =

Bangladeshi politician

Members of Parliament
- Incumbent
- Assumed office 17 February 2026
- Preceded by: Zahid Ahsan Russel
- Constituency: Gazipur-2

Personal details
- Party: Bangladesh Nationalist Party
- Occupation: Politician

M Manjurul Karim Roni is a Bangladesh Nationalist Party politician and a Jatiya Sangsad member representing the Gazipur-2 constituency.
