= Tongi =

City in Siddyirganj, Narayanganj, Bangladesh

Tongi টঙ্গী
- Town
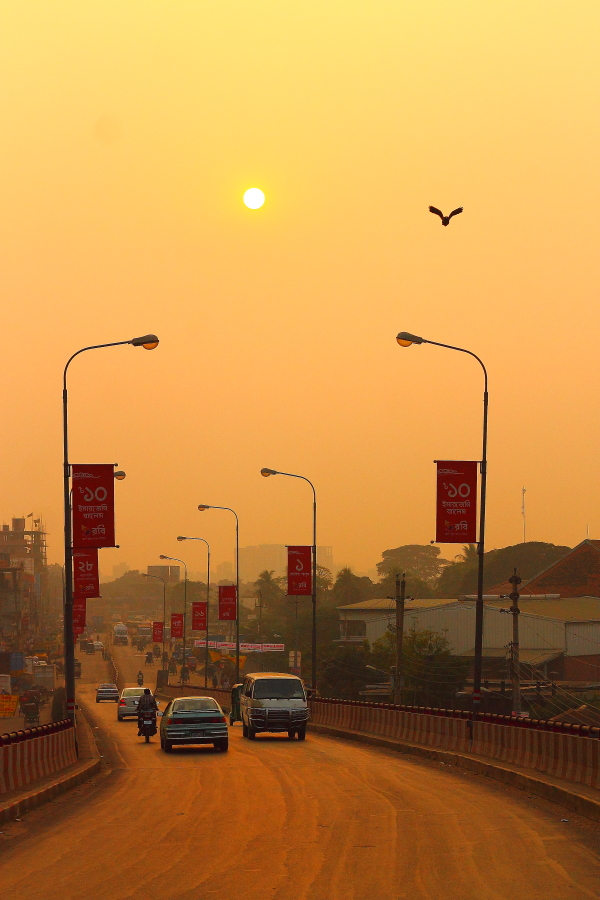
- A road in Tongi

- Location in Dhaka Division Location in Bangladesh
- Coordinates: 23.90°N 90.41°E
- Country: Bangladesh
- Division: Dhaka Division
- District: Gazipur District

Government
  - Type: Mayor–Council
  - Body: Gazipur City Corporation

Area
  - Total: 32.07 km^{2} (12.38 sq mi)

Population (2011)
  - Total: 350,000
  - Density: 11,000/km^{2} (28,000/sq mi)
  - Rank: 36th
- Time zone: UTC+6 (Bangladesh Time)
- National Dialing Code: +880

Tongi (Bengali: টঙ্গী) is a major township in Gazipur, Bangladesh, with a population of 350,000. It hosts the Biswa Ijtema and features a BSCIC industrial area, which produces BDT 1500 crore of industrial products annually, and marks the northern border of Dhaka since 1786. The Tongi Shahid Smrity high School compound is a mass burial site of the genocide committed during the Bangladesh Liberation War. It is part of Greater Dhaka.

== History ==
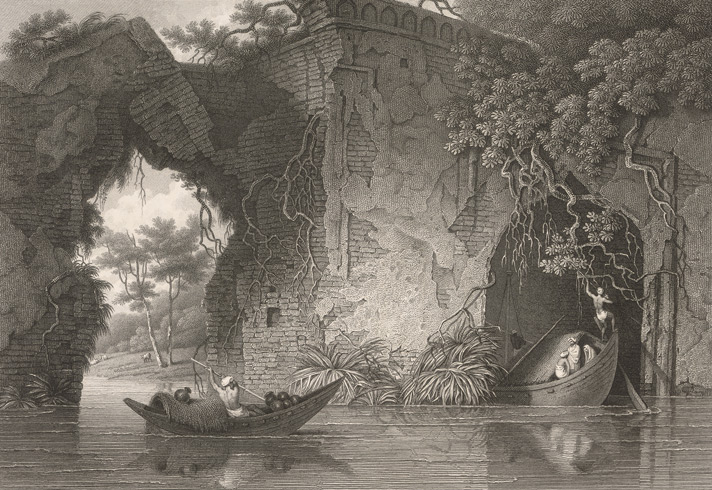
Ruins of Tungy Bridge, an etching by Charles D'Oyly's (1825).

Mir Jumla II (1660–1663) built a fort to protect the northern entry of Dhaka during his reign as a Mughal subadar (1660–1663). The subadar also built a bridge over the river Turag. Mir Jumla constructed a road, now a part of the Dhaka-Mymensingh highway, that connected Tongi with Bag-e-Badshahi. It served as an axis of urban growth in the 19th and 20th centuries as sites for establishment of new urban settlements - Gulshan (formed in 1961), Banani (in 1964), Baridhara (in 1972) and Uttara (in 1965) - were picked off the highlands along that axis road.

In 1786, Tongi-Jamalpur was designated as the northern boundary of Dhaka by the East India Company, reaffirmed by John Taylor, the first English Commercial Resident of Dhaka in 1800.

== Geography and administration ==
Tongi, a thana (police station) within the Gazipur Sadar Upazila along with Joydebpur since 1983, is located immediately north of Dhaka. It lies within the jurisdiction Gazipur District, which is a part of the Dhaka Division.

Geologically, the Tongi area comprises the southern extension of the Madhupur tract, a long narrow tract of tectonically elevated area of older sediments only a few metres above the surrounding rivers the Turag. Locally, the Tract is subdivided into the Bhawal Garh terrace which is a part of an inlier, an elevated area surrounded by lowlands by very young riverine sediments occupying the surrounding valleys. The older sediment sequence consists of sandstone of the Dupi Tila Formation overlain by Madhupur Clay, which in turn is overlain by alluvium. The elevation of the Tract varies from 2 to 14 m above mean sea level and it has shallow bedrock which forms a firm substrate for supporting large structures.

== Demography ==
Many of the people who live in Tongi commute to Dhaka, mainly by bus. Many people are also employed at factories in Export Processing Zones, areas given special tax and tariff exemptions by the government in order to stimulate industry.

== River ==
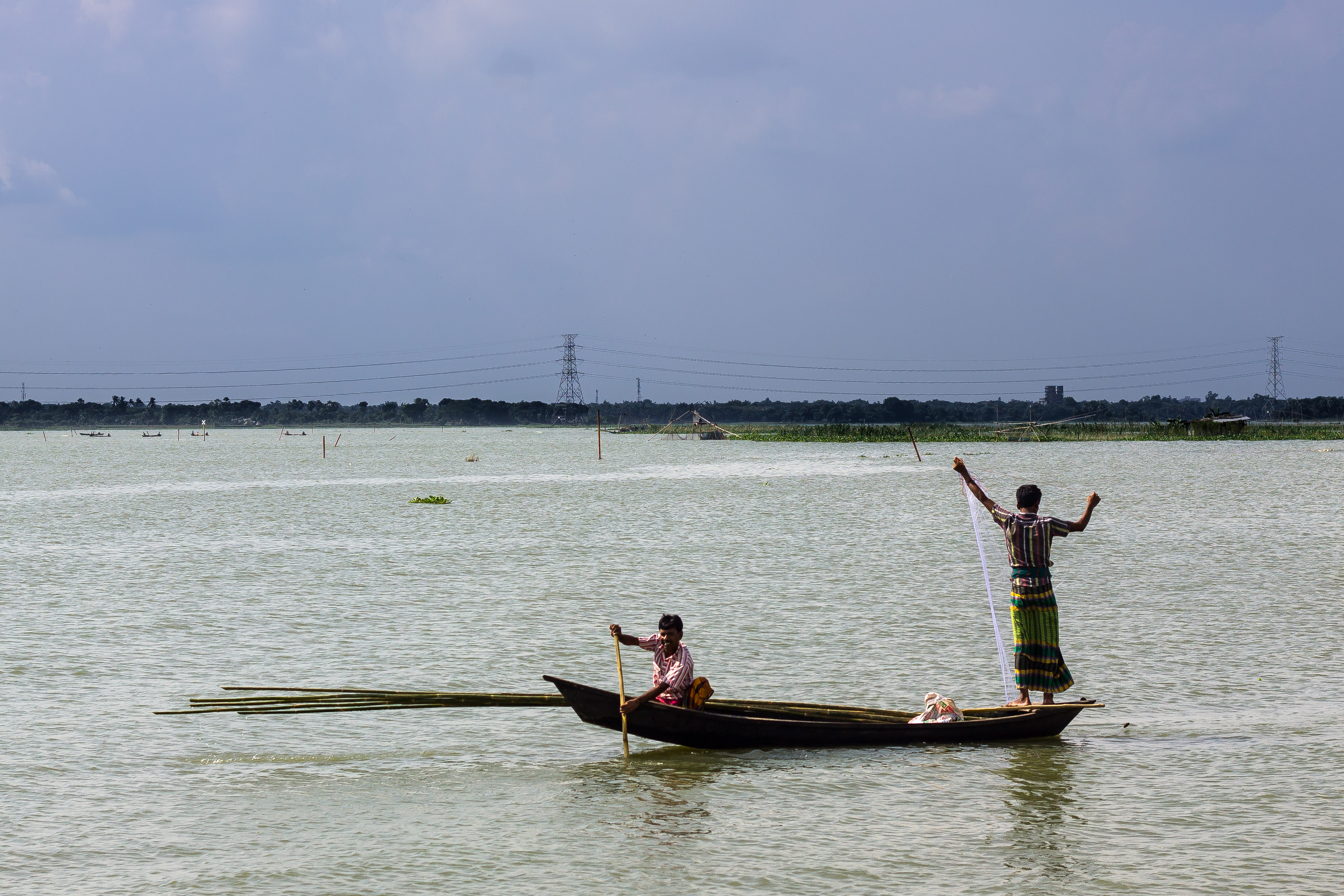
Turag River

Tongi has a bordering river called the Turag River, it is very actively used by the local commuters and traders. The annual Bishwa Ijtema is also held in Tongi beside the banks of Turag River.

== Thana ==
There are two thanas in Tongi – Tongi East and Tongi West Thana.

== Transport ==
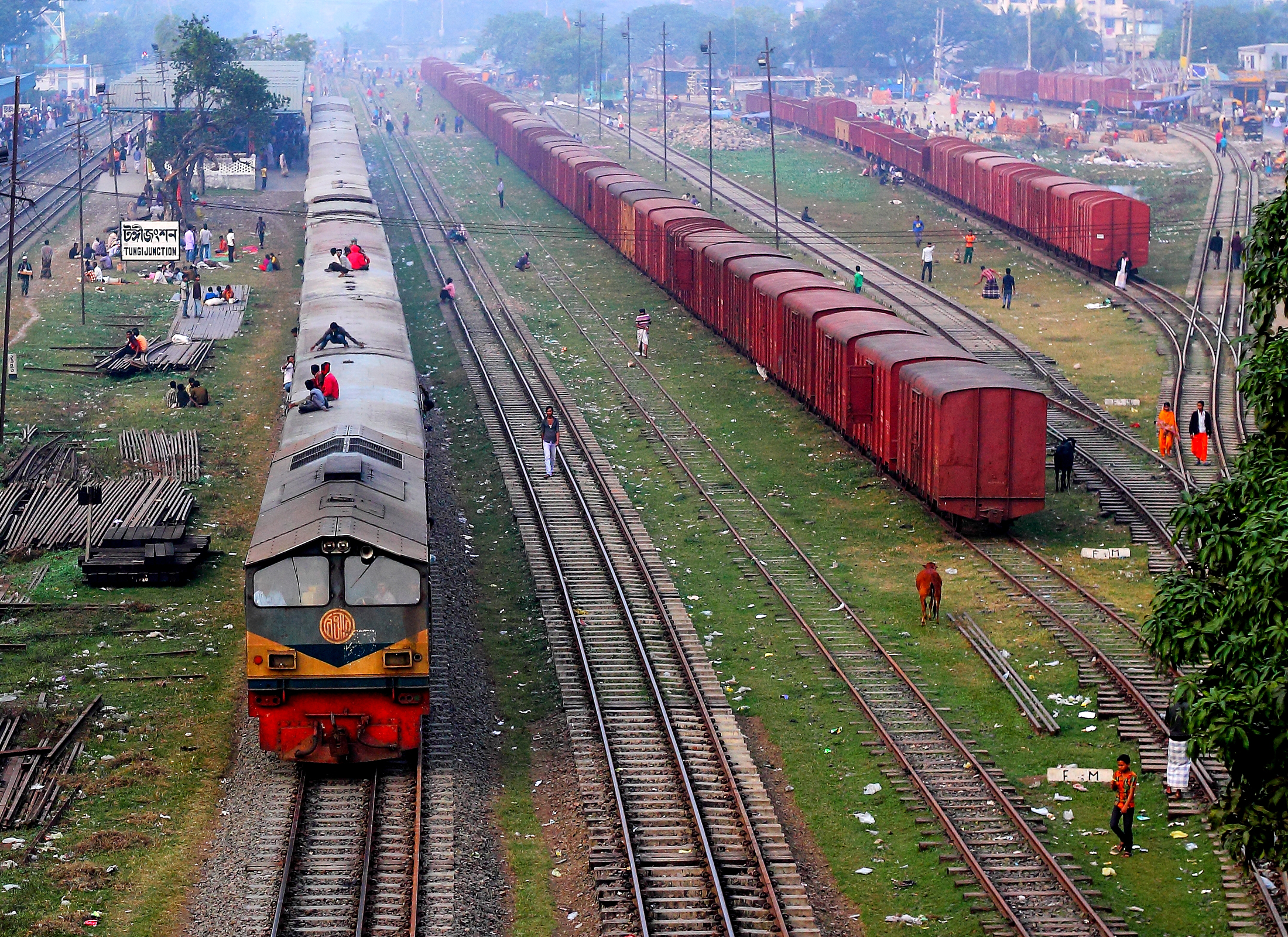
Tongi junction

The newly constructed Tongi Diversion Road forms another important artery of the road network leading to Dhaka.

The Narayanganj–Dhaka–Mymensingh State railway was opened in 1885–86. Tongi has a break of gauge junction station in the same name where the new cross country line across the Jamuna Bridge from the western section joins the eastern section. Tongi is situated on the bank of the river Turag, transport boats and cargo boats are also available here.

== Education ==
Educational institutions in this area include:

- Tongi Government College
- Mozida Government High School
- Safiuddin Sarker Academy and College
- Tongi Pilot School & Girls' College
- Shilmon Abdul Hakim Master High School
- Mamdee Mollah High School
- Tamirul Millat Kamil Madrasaa

== Medical colleges and hospitals ==
- Shaheed Ahsan Ullah Master General Hospital
- Tairunnessa Memorial Medical College & Hospital - 375 bedded hospital
- International Medical College & Hospital - 500 bedded hospital

== Notable people ==
- Ahsanullah Master, Politician
- Zahid Ahsan Russell, Politician
