= Tongi Pilot School and Girls' College =

- টঙ্গী পাইলট স্কুল এন্ড গার্লস কলেজ
- Emblem of Tongi Pilot School and Girls' College

Location
- Auchpara, Tongi, Gazipur; Bangladesh; 23.9080°N 90.3968°E

Information
- Type: Secondary & Higher Secondary (MPO)
- Motto: আলোকিত মানুষ গড়ার প্রত্যয়ে
- Established: March 3, 1946 (Classes commenced in 1947)
- Authority: Board of Intermediate and Secondary Education, Dhaka
- School code: 109062 (EIIN: 109062)
- Principal: Md. Alauddin Mia
- Grades: Nursery–12
- Enrollment: 5,000+
- Campus size: 4.3 acres (1.7 ha)
- Campus type: Plain Land
- Website: tongipilotsagc.edu.bd

Tongi Pilot School and Girls' College (Bengali: টঙ্গী পাইলট স্কুল এন্ড গার্লস কলেজ), commonly abbreviated as TPSGC, is a prominent educational institution situated in Auchpara, Tongi, Gazipur District, Dhaka Division, Bangladesh. The secondary school section of the institution is officially registered under the name Tongi Pilot High School. However, following the integration of the college section in 1991, the official name of the entire institution became Tongi Pilot School and Girls' College, and it is widely known among the general public by this name. The institution operates under a dual structural system: the primary (Nursery to Class 5) and secondary (Class 6 to Class 10) sections are co-educational, admitting both boys and girls, whereas the higher secondary college (Class 11 and Class 12) section, established in 1991, is exclusively reserved for female students. Established on March 3, 1946, its academic operations formally commenced in 1947. The institution operates under the Board of Intermediate and Secondary Education, Dhaka, offering instruction across science, humanities, and business studies disciplines.

== History ==
The institution was established on March 3, 1946, to fulfill the expanding educational requirements of the local community in Tongi, officially starting its regular classes in 1947. It initially operated as a co-educational primary and standalone secondary school registered as Tongi Pilot High School. To promote and accommodate female higher education in the locality, the institution expanded its structural and academic scope in 1991 by opening a dedicated higher secondary section exclusively for female students. Following this integration in 1991, the entire institution was officially named Tongi Pilot School and Girls' College. Despite the official distinction, the institution is most commonly recognized and referred to by the public and students using its college name format.

== Academics ==
TPSGC provides curriculum-based education utilizing Bengali as the primary medium of instruction. The academic framework is structured into three distinct educational levels:

- Primary Section: Nursery to Class 5 (Co-educational for both boys and girls).
- Secondary Section: Class 6 to Class 10 (Co-educational for both boys and girls).
- Higher Secondary (College) Section: Class 11 and Class 12 (Established in 1991, exclusively for female students).

Students pursuing higher secondary education can specialize in three distinct academic streams: science, humanities, and business studies.

The institution is officially recognized by the Directorate of Secondary and Higher Education, receiving its formal institutional recognition at the higher secondary level on November 1, 1996. The college operates within the Monthly Pay Order (MPO) framework of the Ministry of Education under the registration codes 2706021302 and 2706013101. The total student enrollment across all sections exceeds 5,000, managed under the administrative leadership of the current principal, Md. Alauddin Mia.

=== Operations and timings ===
The institution operates in split academic shifts to accommodate its student body. The primary and secondary sections run a morning shift dedicated to female students and a day shift dedicated to male students. The higher secondary college section for female students functions across both morning and day shifts.

Except for weekly holidays and official government vacations, the institutional administrative office remains active daily from 7:30 AM to 4:30 PM, with a scheduled recess for lunch from 1:00 PM to 2:00 PM. Administrative hours may be extended or adjusted during examination periods or admissions under special instructions from the principal.

== Campus and infrastructure ==
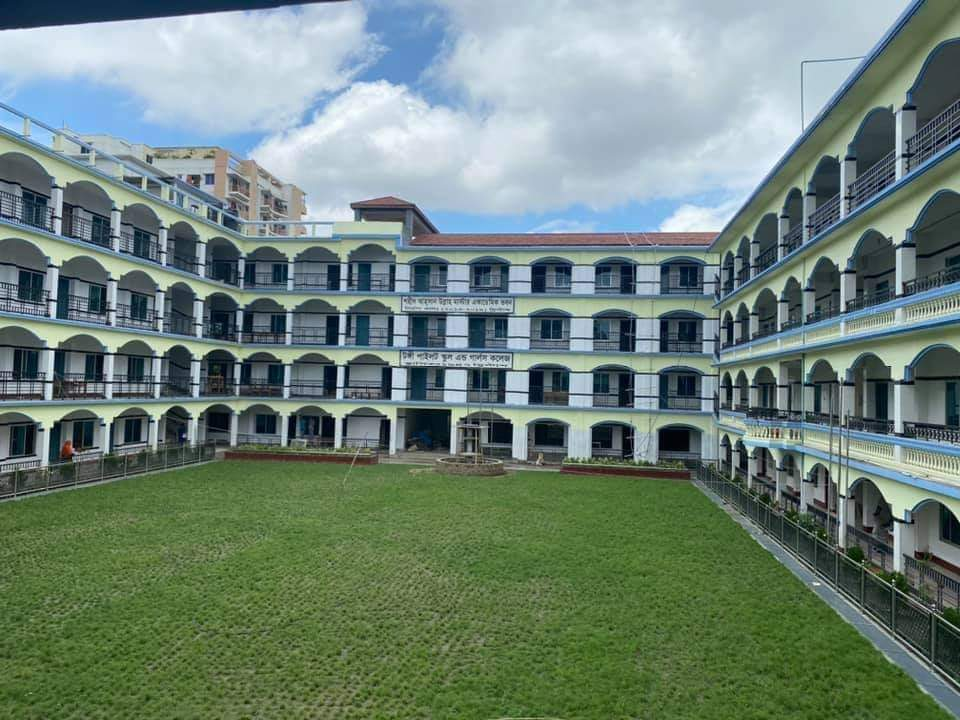
Academic Building of TPSGC

The institution is built upon a plain geographical terrain within the Tongi Pourashava (Municipality) boundaries, spanning a total land area of 430 decimals (approximately 4.3 acres). The campus infrastructure includes an internal floor space layout measuring approximately 15,481 square feet, distributed across 60 functional rooms utilized for academic instruction and administrative operations. The campus grounds also feature a dedicated institutional playground encompassing an area of 210 decimals. General operations, administrative guidelines, and institutional development plans are governed by an official institutional Governing Body.

== Student life ==
=== Dress code ===
The institution maintains a mandatory uniform policy for all enrolled students. The prescribed dress codes across different sections are structured as follows:

- Secondary School (Boys): White half- or full-sleeved shirts featuring the institutional monogram on the left pocket and shoulder badges on both sides, paired with black trousers, a navy blue tie, a black belt, black sneakers (keds), and white socks.
- Secondary School (Girls): Navy blue frocks, white cross-belts featuring the institutional monogram on the left and shoulder badges on both sides, paired with white salwars, white headscarves (hijab/scarf), black sneakers, and white socks.
- Higher Secondary College (Girls): White kameez, white salwars, white headscarves, black sneakers, and white socks.
