= Bhawal National Park =

National park in Bangladesh

- ভাওয়াল জাতীয় উদ্যান
- IUCN category IV (habitat/species management area)
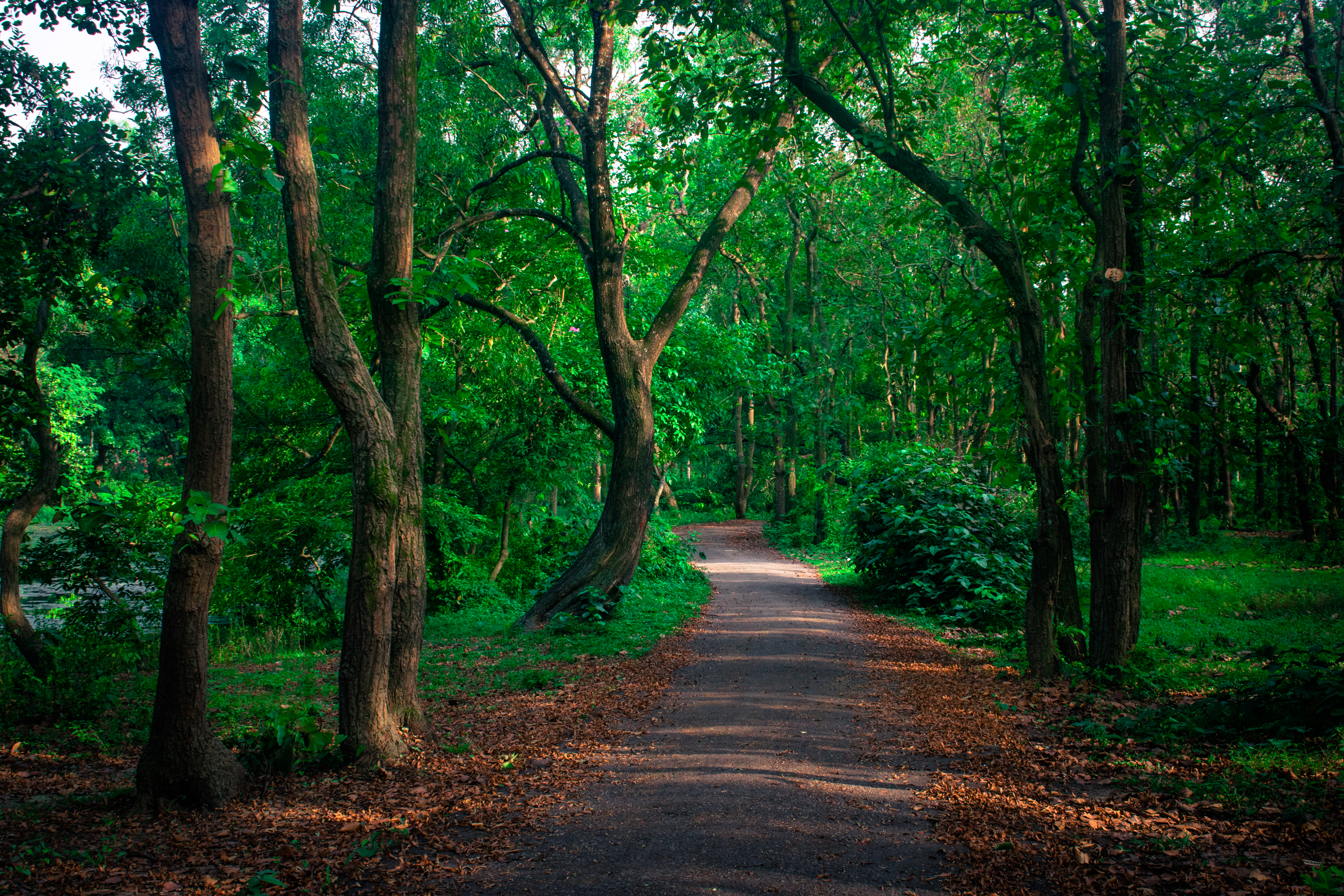
- Bhawal National Park Forest and land

- Location within Bangladesh
- Location: Gazipur, Dhaka Division of Bangladesh
- Coordinates: 24°5′45″N 90°24′14″E
- Area: 5,022 ha (12,410 acres)
- Established: 1982

Bhawal National Park (Bengali: ভাওয়াল জাতীয় উদ্যান) is a nature reserve and national park of Bangladesh.

== History ==
Bhawal National Park was established and maintained as a National Park in 1974; it was officially declared in 1982 under the Wildlife Act of 1974. By origin, it was the forest of Madhupur under the rule of Bhawal Estate. It is located in Gazipur, Dhaka Division of Bangladesh, approximately 40 km north of Dhaka city, and 20 km each from Gazipur and Kapasia. The core area of the park covers 940 hectares (2,322 acres) but extends to 5,022 ha (12,409 acres) of surrounding forest. Its purpose is to protect important habitats as well as to provide opportunities for recreation. It has been kept under IUCN Management Category V, as a protected landscape. The most common flora is the unique coppice sal forest. The area was noted for peacocks, tiger, leopard, black panther, elephant, clouded leopard and sambar deer. However much of the wildlife had disappeared and only a few species remain. Also, most of the forest has been denuded and is now occupied by forestry companies or displaced people.

Most of this area was covered by forests fifty years ago and the dominant species was Sal (Shorea robusta). Illegal deforestation has left only 600 km^{2} of the original forest; new trees and woodlands have been planted.

== Ecology ==
The park has 345 plant species, including 151 different tree species, 53 shrubs, 106 herbs and 34 climber species. The wildlife in the park includes 13 mammals, 9 reptiles, 5 birds and 5 amphibians. In addition the Forest Department has recently introduced peacocks, deer, pythons, and catfish.

== Gallery ==
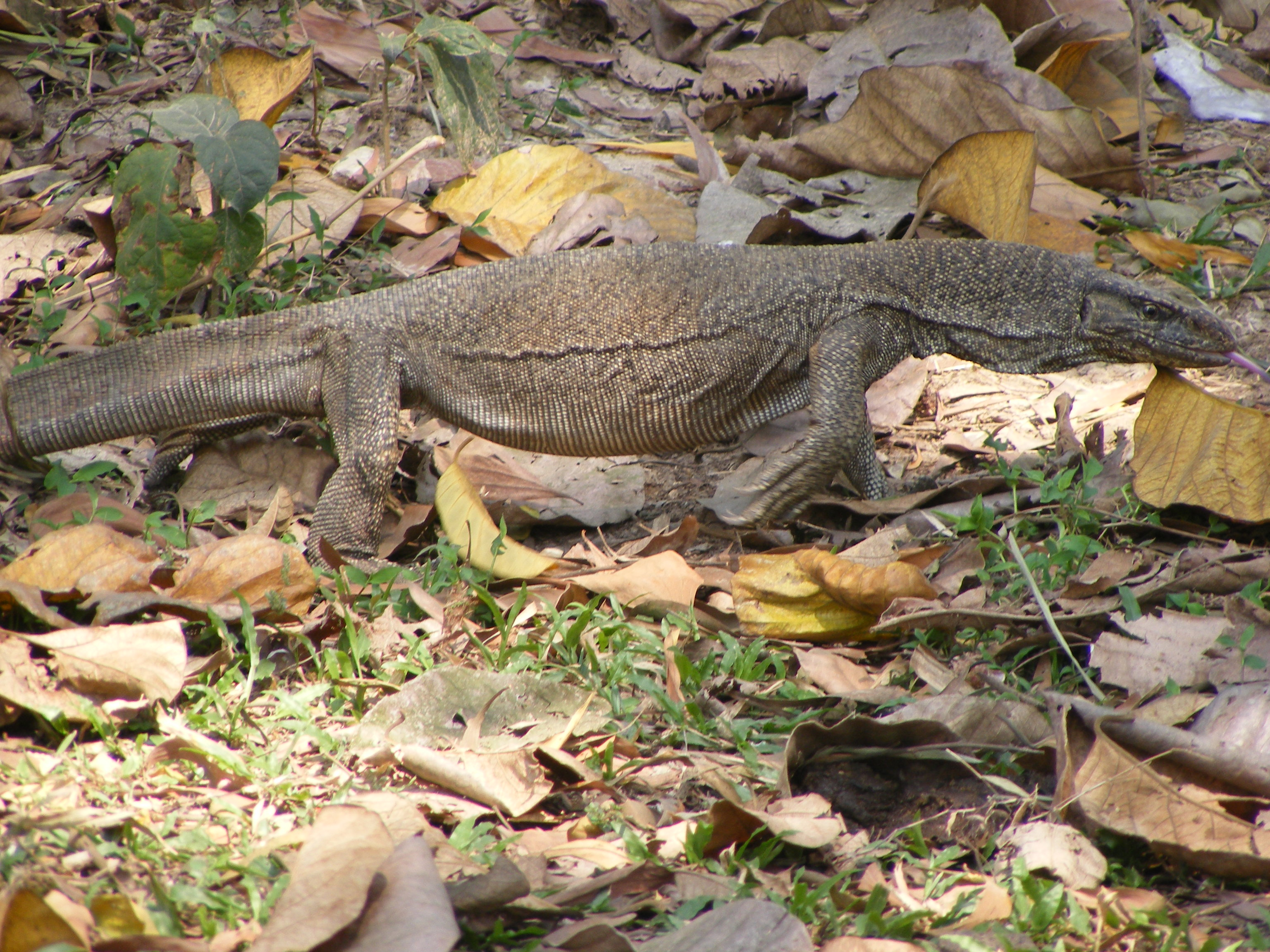
Bengal monitor

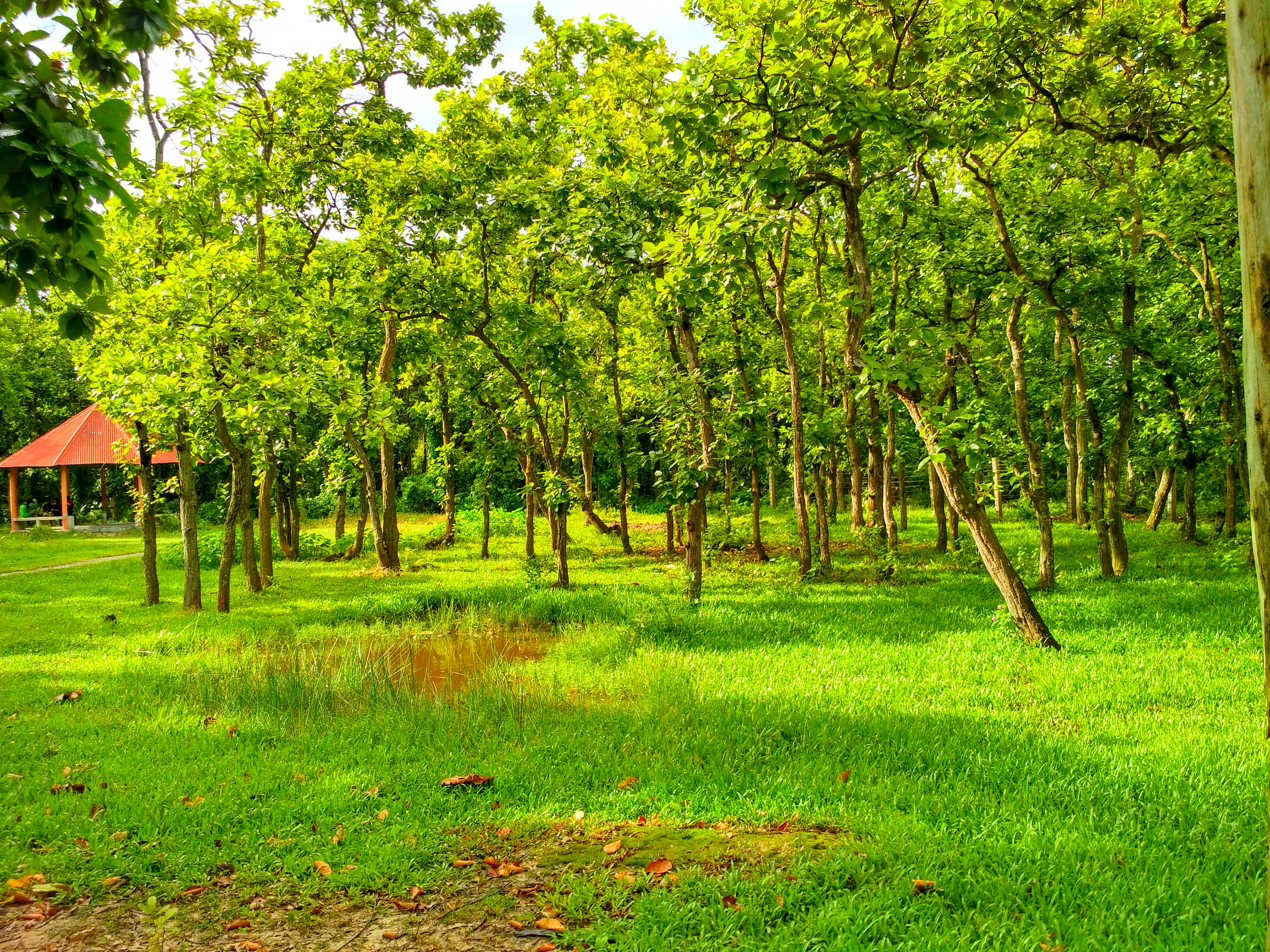

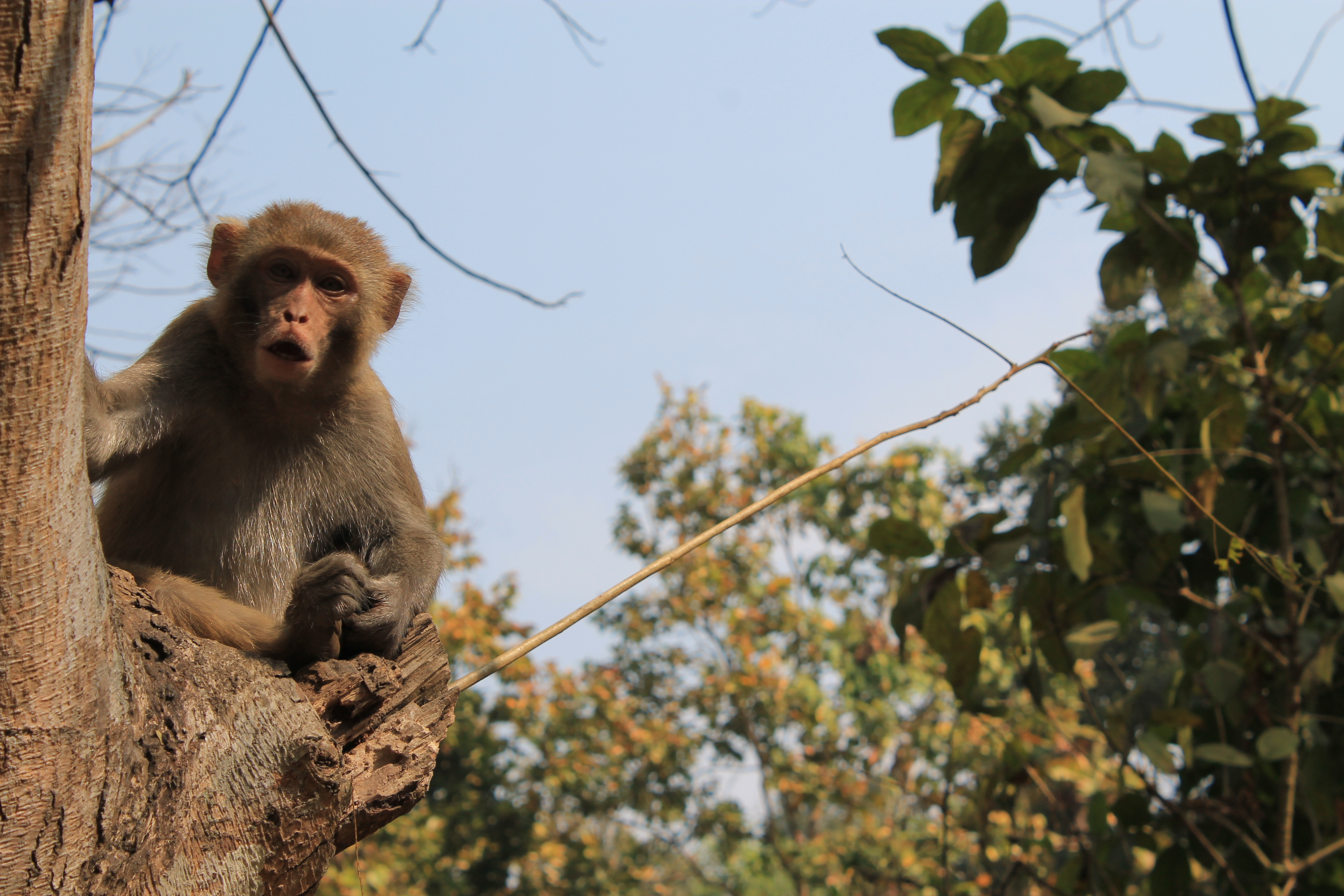

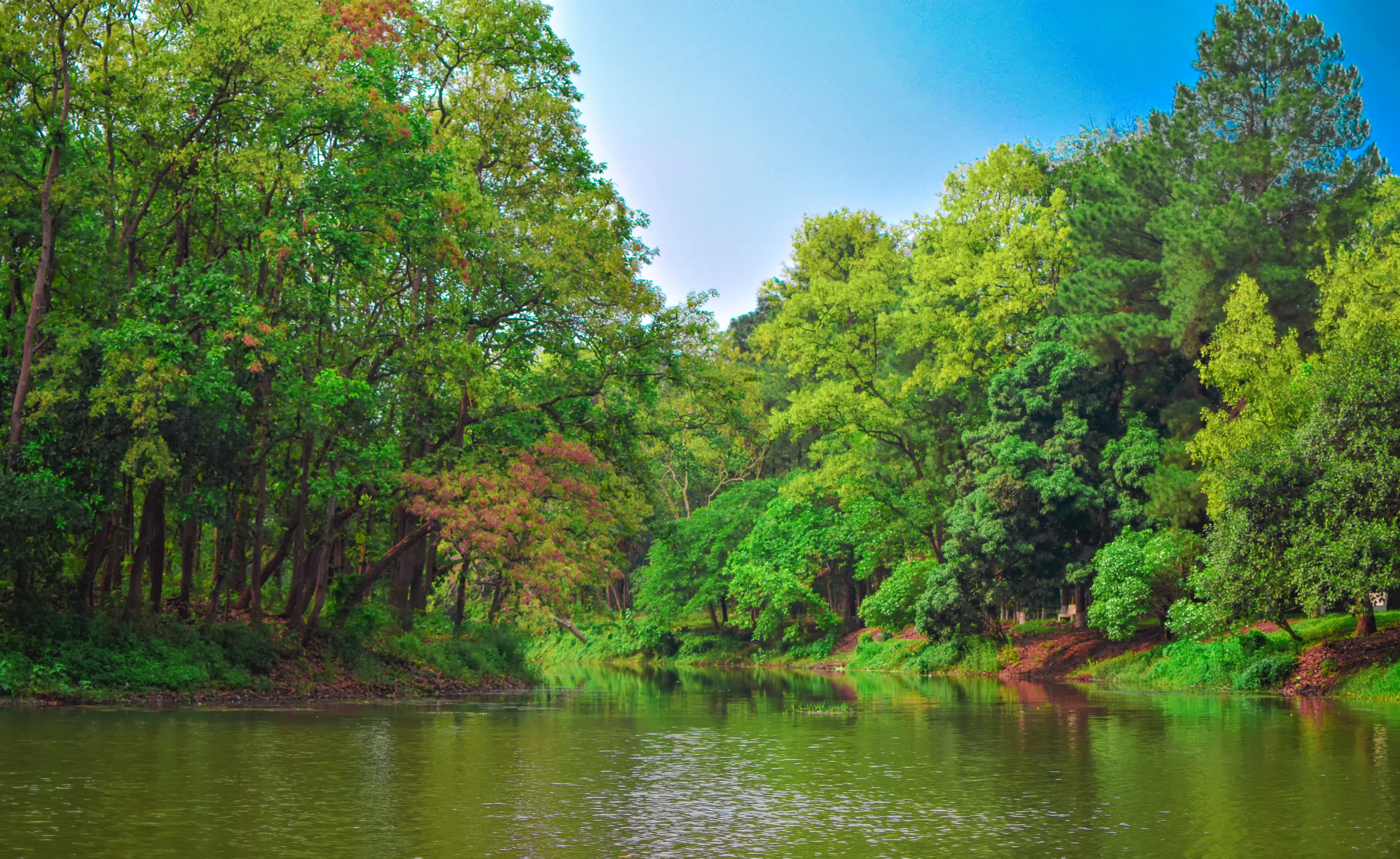

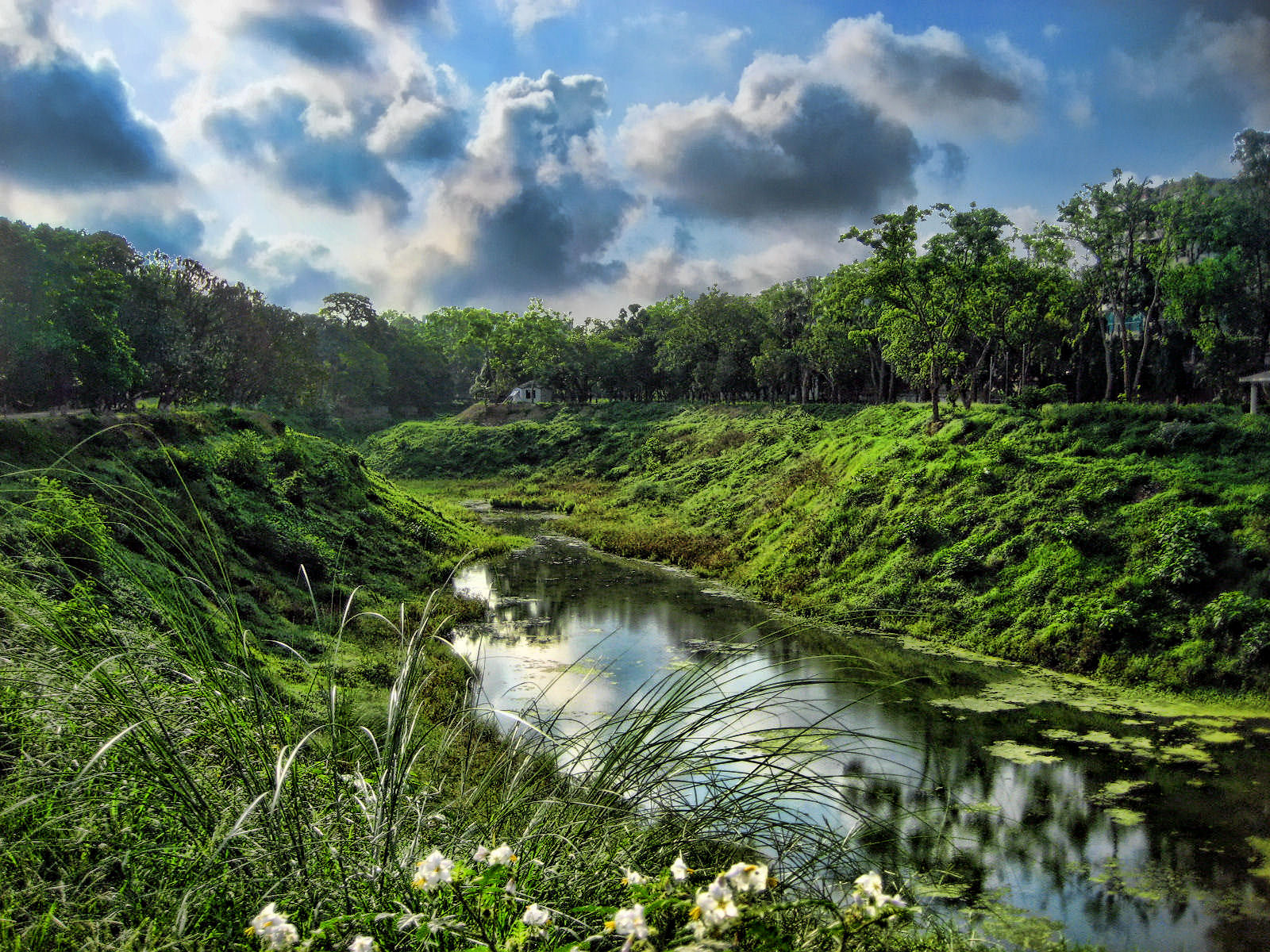

== See also ==
- Madhupur tract
- List of protected areas of Bangladesh
