= Gazipur District =

Gazipur District গাজীপুর জেলা
- District of Bangladesh
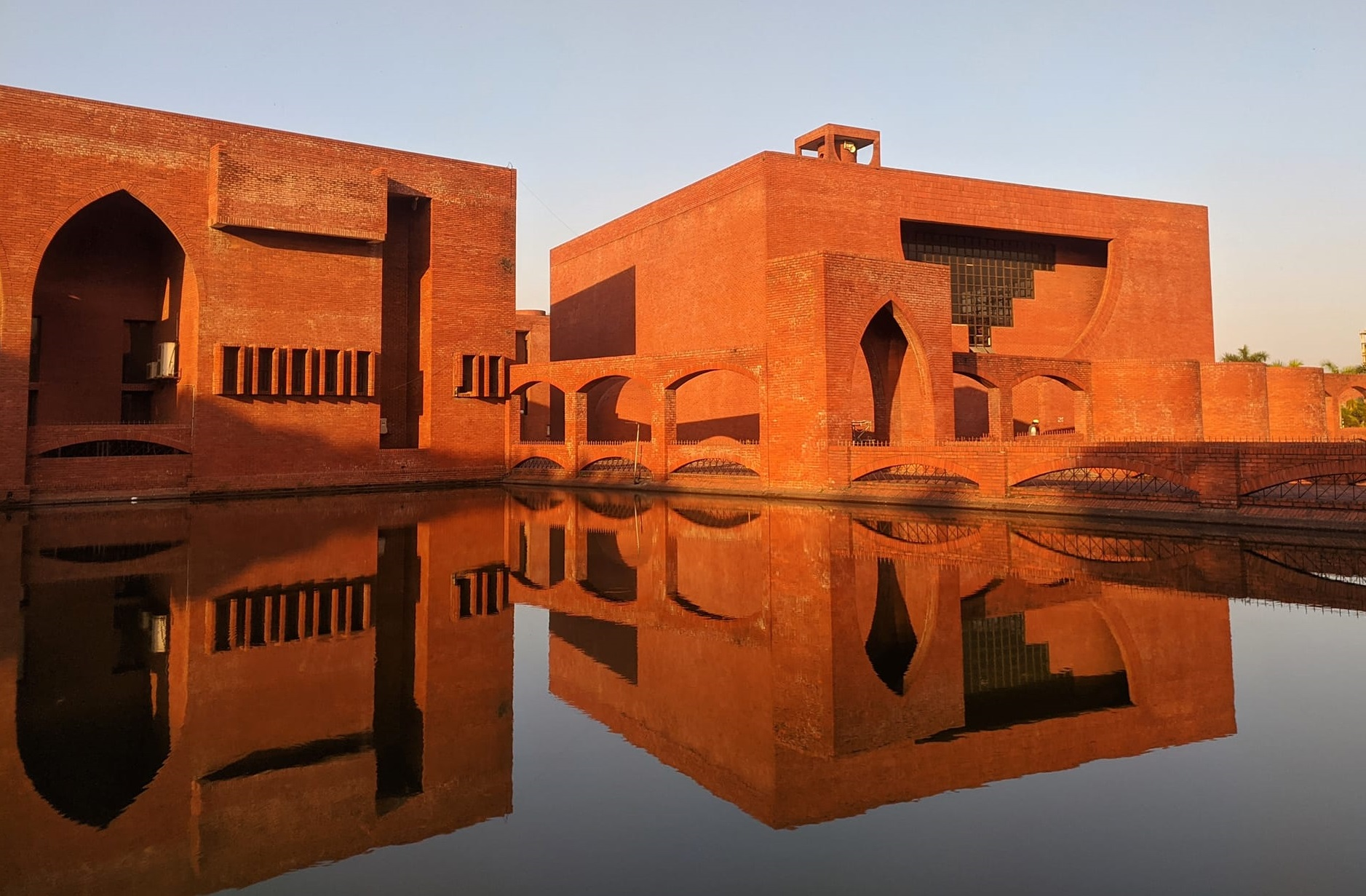
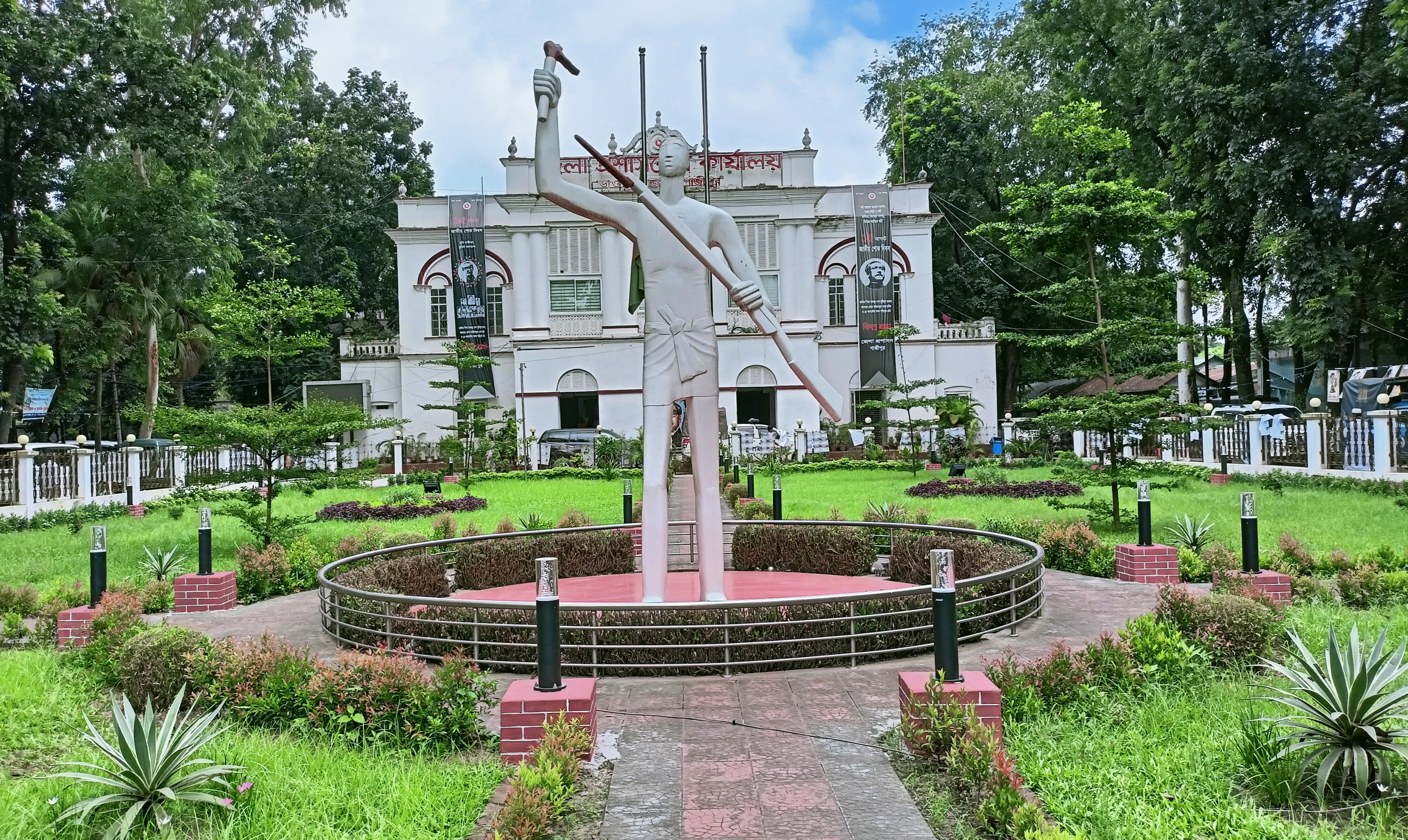
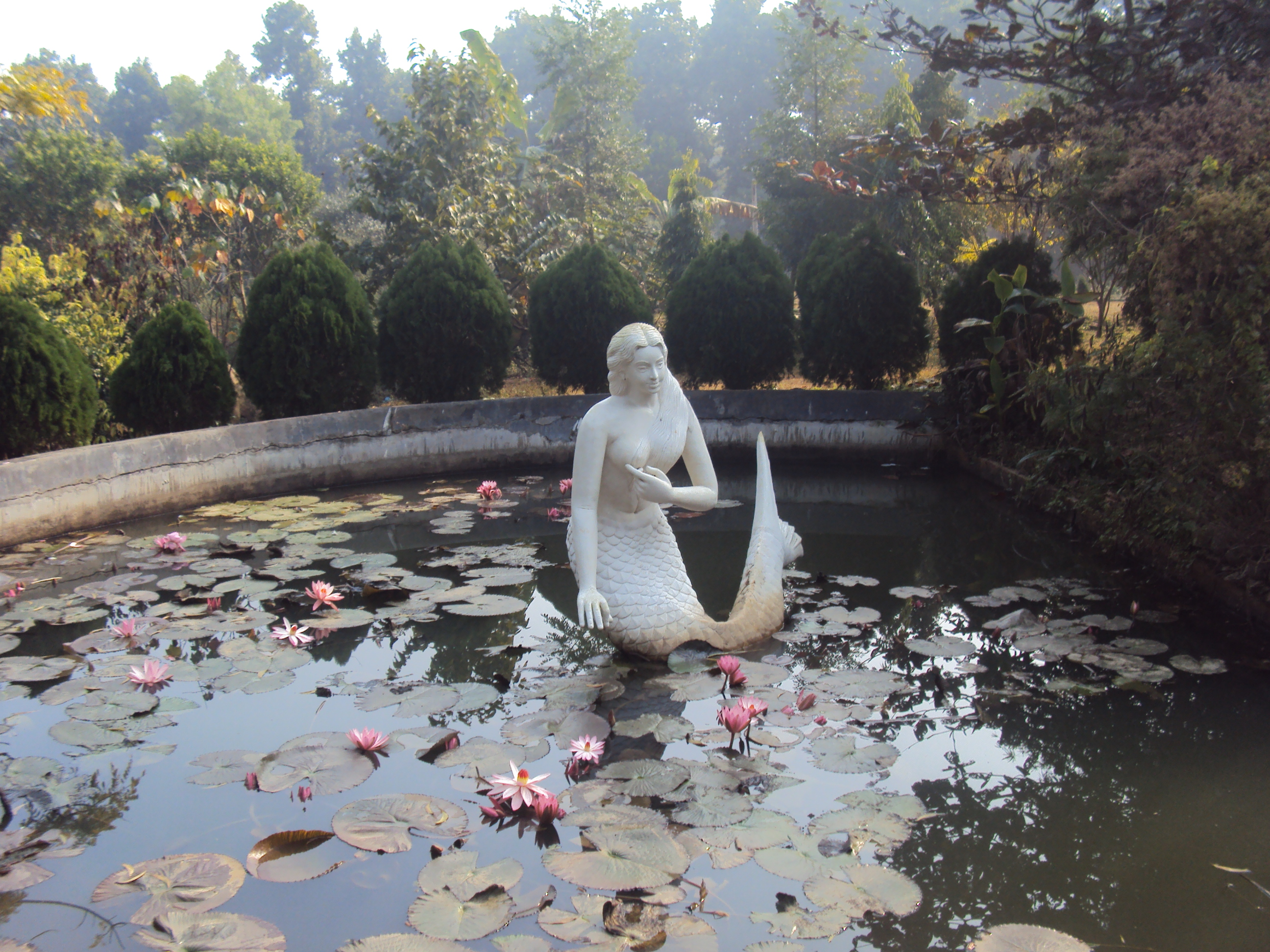
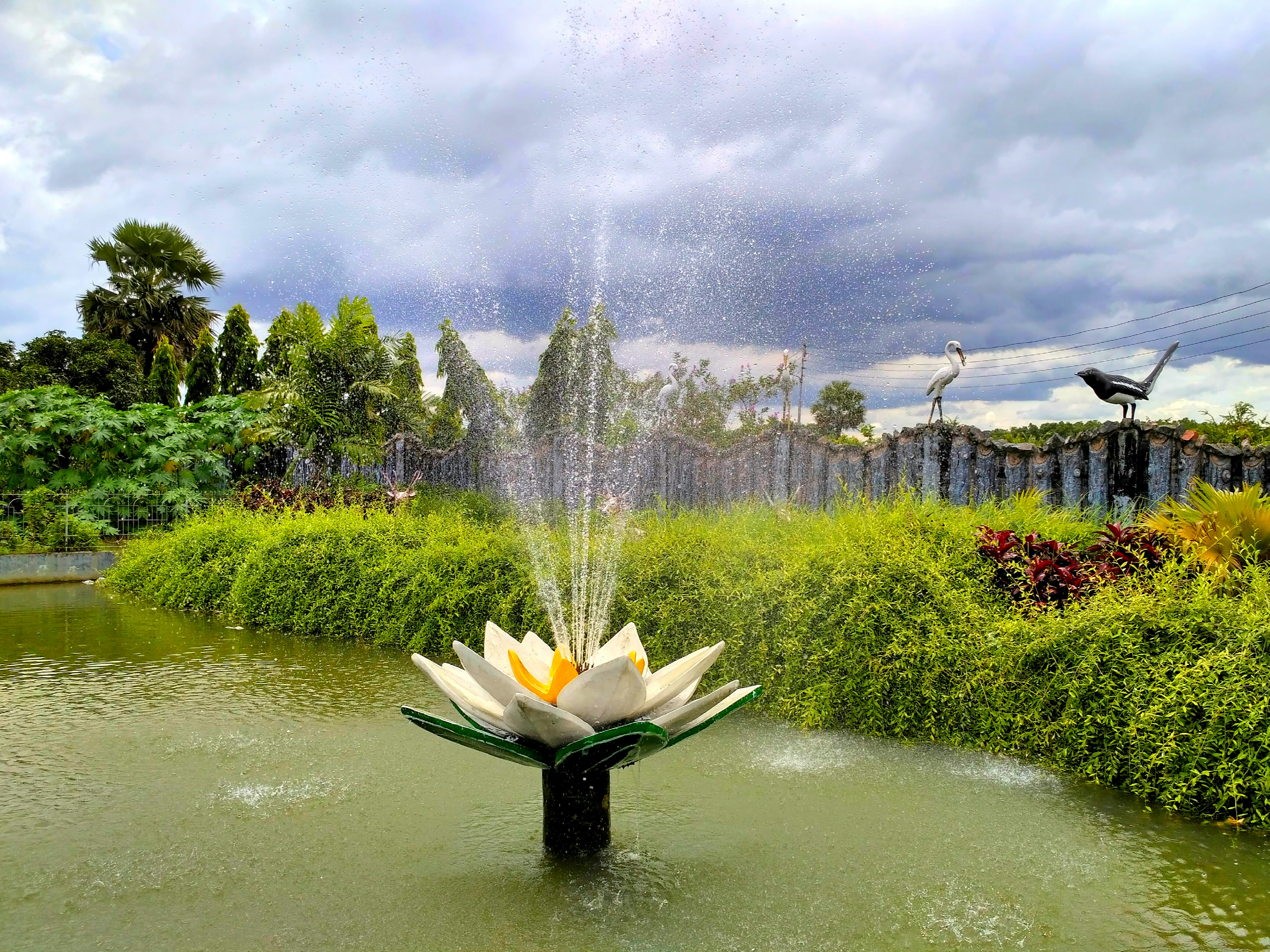
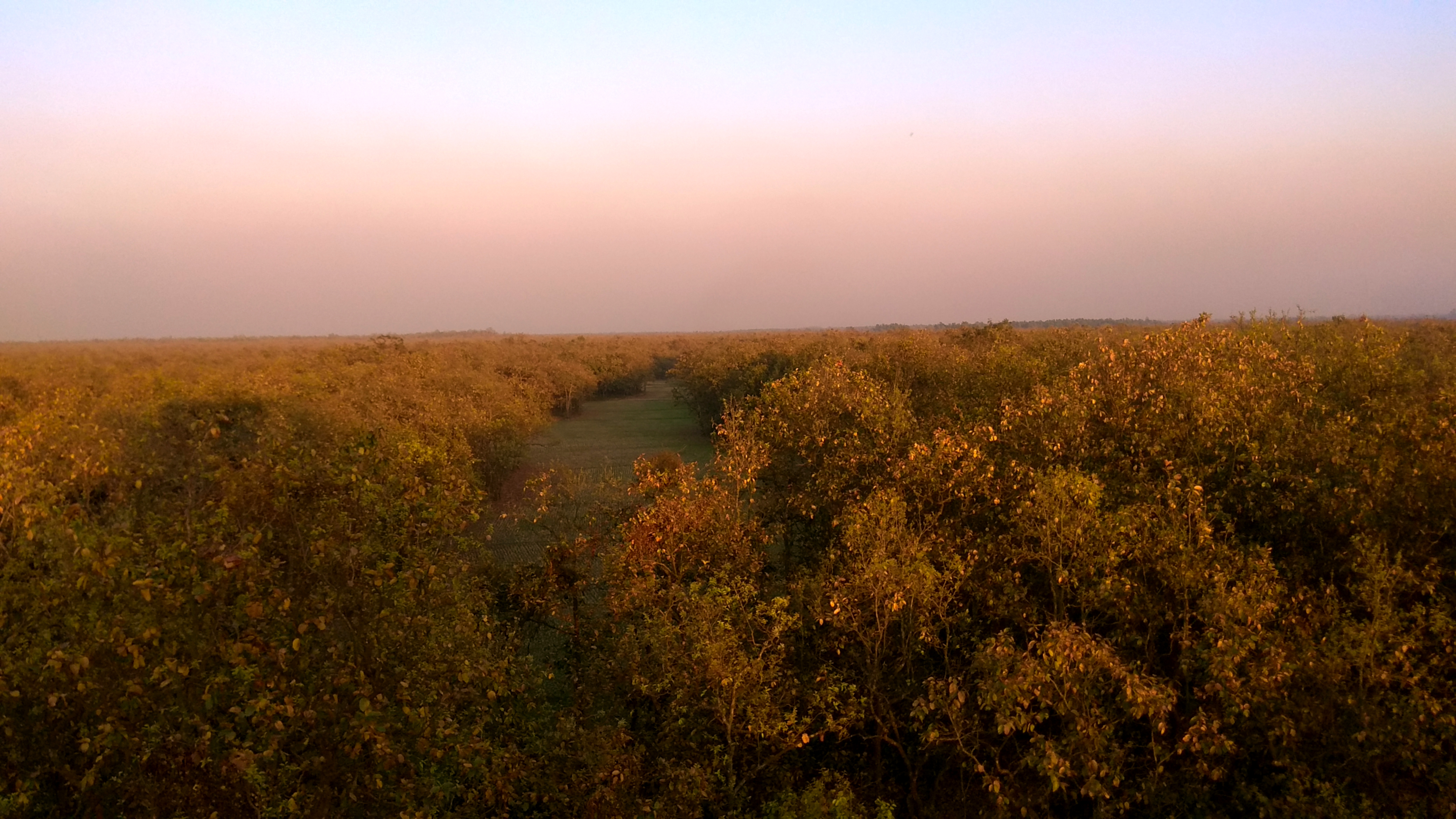
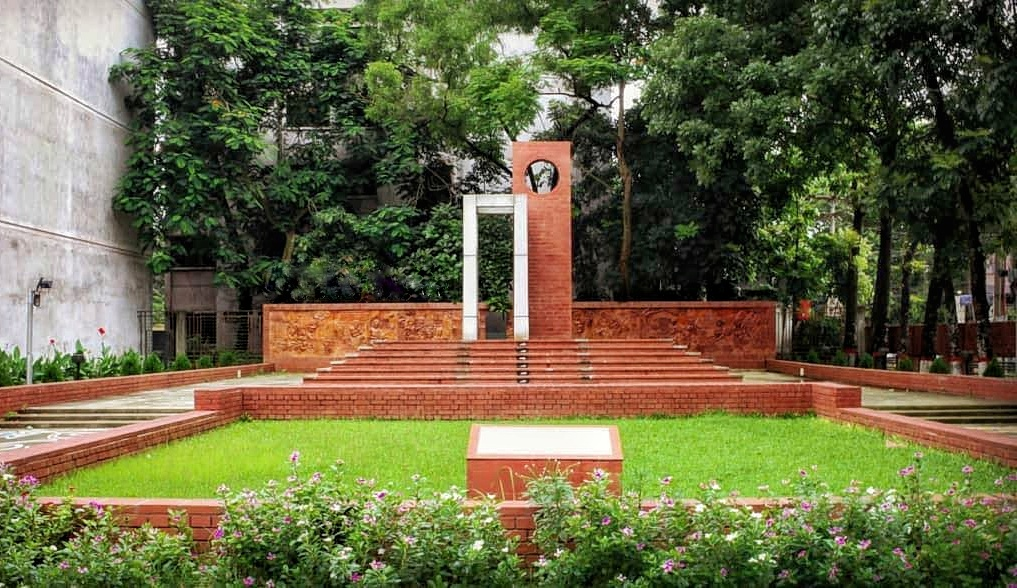
- IUT at Gazipur, Bhawal Zamindar Bari, Gazipur Safari Park, Bhawal National Park, Nuhash Polli, DUET

- Location of Gazipur District in Bangladesh
- Interactive map of Gazipur District
- Coordinates: 24.00°N 90.43°E
- Country: Bangladesh
- Division: Dhaka
- Headquarters: Gazipur

Government
  - District Council Administrator: Ishrak Ahmed Siddiky
  - Deputy Commissioner: Md. Nurul Karim Bhuiyan

Area
  - Total: 1,806.36 km^{2} (697.44 sq mi)

Population (2022)
  - Total: 5,263,450
  - Density: 2,913.84/km^{2} (7,546.82/sq mi)
- Demonym: Gazipur basi
- Time zone: UTC+06:00 (BST)
- Postal code: 1700
- Area code: 0681
- ISO 3166 code: BD-18
- Website: gazipur.gov.bd

Gazipur District (Bengali: গাজীপুর জেলা) is a district in central Bangladesh, that is part of the Dhaka Division. It has an area of 1806.36 km^{2}. It is the home district of Tajuddin Ahmad, the first Prime Minister of Bangladesh and has been a prominent centre of battles and movements throughout history. Gazipur is home to the Bishwa Ijtema (lit. "world congregation"), the second-largest annual Muslim gathering in the world with over 5 million attendees. The district is home to numerous universities, colleges, the Gazipur Safari Park, Bhawal National Park as well as the country's only business park - the Hi-Tech City, Kaliakoir.

== History ==
The ancient city of Dholsamudra in present-day Gazipur served as one of the capitals of the Buddhist Pala Empire. In the sixth century, forts were built in Toke and Ekdala which continued to be used as late as the Mughal Period. The area became known as a strategic region with the establishment of more forts such as that of Karnapur, the digging of the Twin Ponds in 1045. Chinashkhania was the capital of the Chandalas and Shishu Pal had his capital in modern-day Sreepur, which the ruins of can still be seen today. Another fort was built in Dardaria in 1200.

During the reign of the Sultan of Bengal Alauddin Husain Shah (1494-1519), an Islamic scholar known as Shaykh Muhammad ibn Yazdan Bakhsh Bengali visited Ekdala where he transcribed Sahih al-Bukhari and gifted it to the Sultan in nearby Sonargaon. The manuscript is currently kept at the Khuda Bakhsh Oriental Library in Bankipore, Patna, Bihar.

The anti-Mughal leader of the Baro-Bhuiyans, Isa Khan, died of natural causes in September 1599. He was buried in the village of Bakhtarpur. During the governorship of Subahdar Mir Jumla II, a bridge was constructed in Tongi.

The British colonials built indigo factories in Raniganj and Barmi. The first armed resistance of the 1971 Bangladesh Liberation War took place in Gazipur on 19 March 1971.

== Demographics ==
Historical population
Year	Pop.	±% p.a.
1974	898,264	—
1981	1,176,429	+3.93%
1991	1,621,562	+3.26%
2001	2,031,891	+2.28%
2011	3,403,912	+5.30%
2022	5,263,450	+4.04%

According to the 2022 Census of Bangladesh, Gazipur District had 1,579,781 households and a population of 5,263,450 with an average 3.29 people per household. Among the population, 827,272 (15.72%) inhabitants were under 10 years of age. The population density was 2,914 people per km^{2}. Gazipur District had a literacy rate (age 7 and over) of 81.42%, compared to the national average of 74.80%, and a sex ratio of 923 females per 1000 males. Approximately, 64.29% of the population lived in urban areas. The ethnic population was 9,773.

Religions in Gazipur District (2022)
Religion	Percent
Islam	94.45%
Hinduism	5.01%
Christianity	0.50%
Other or not stated	0.04%

Religion in present-day Gazipur District
Religion	1941 (Note: 1941 figures refer to Kaliganj, Kapasia, Joydepur, Sripur and Kaliakair thanas of erstwhile Dacca district, which roughly corresponds to the present district. District and thana borders have shifted since then.)		1981		1991		2001		2011		2022	
Religion	Pop.	%	Pop.	%	Pop.	%	Pop.	%	Pop.	%	Pop.	%
Islam	366,601	73.76%	1,066,863	90.69%	1,486,648	91.68%	1,872,943	92.18%	3,200,383	94.02%	4,971,543	94.45%
Hinduism	127,450	25.64%	104,312	8.87%	126,993	7.83%	137,678	6.78%	176,582	5.19%	263,490	5.01%
Christianity	1,715	0.35%	4,190	0.36%	5,951	0.37%	20,124	0.99%	23,843	0.70%	26,189	0.50%
Others (Note: Including Jainism, Buddhism, Zoroastrianism, Judaism, Ad-Dharmis, or not stated)	1,279	0.60%	1,064	0.08%	1,970	0.12%	1,146	0.05%	3,104	0.09%	2,228	0.04%
Total Population	497,045	100%	1,176,429	100%	1,621,562	100%	2,031,891	100%	3,403,912	100%	5,263,450	100%

At the 2011 census, the district had a population of 3,403,912. 94.02% are Muslims, 5.19% Hindus and 0.70% Christians. Unlike most of Bangladesh, religious minorities are more concentrated in rural areas than urban areas. The Christians are largely concentrated in a few unions of Kaliganj Upazila around the village of Nagori which were part of Rupganj Upazila until the 1990s, and are the Bhawal Catholics who converted during Portuguese times.

== Points of interest ==
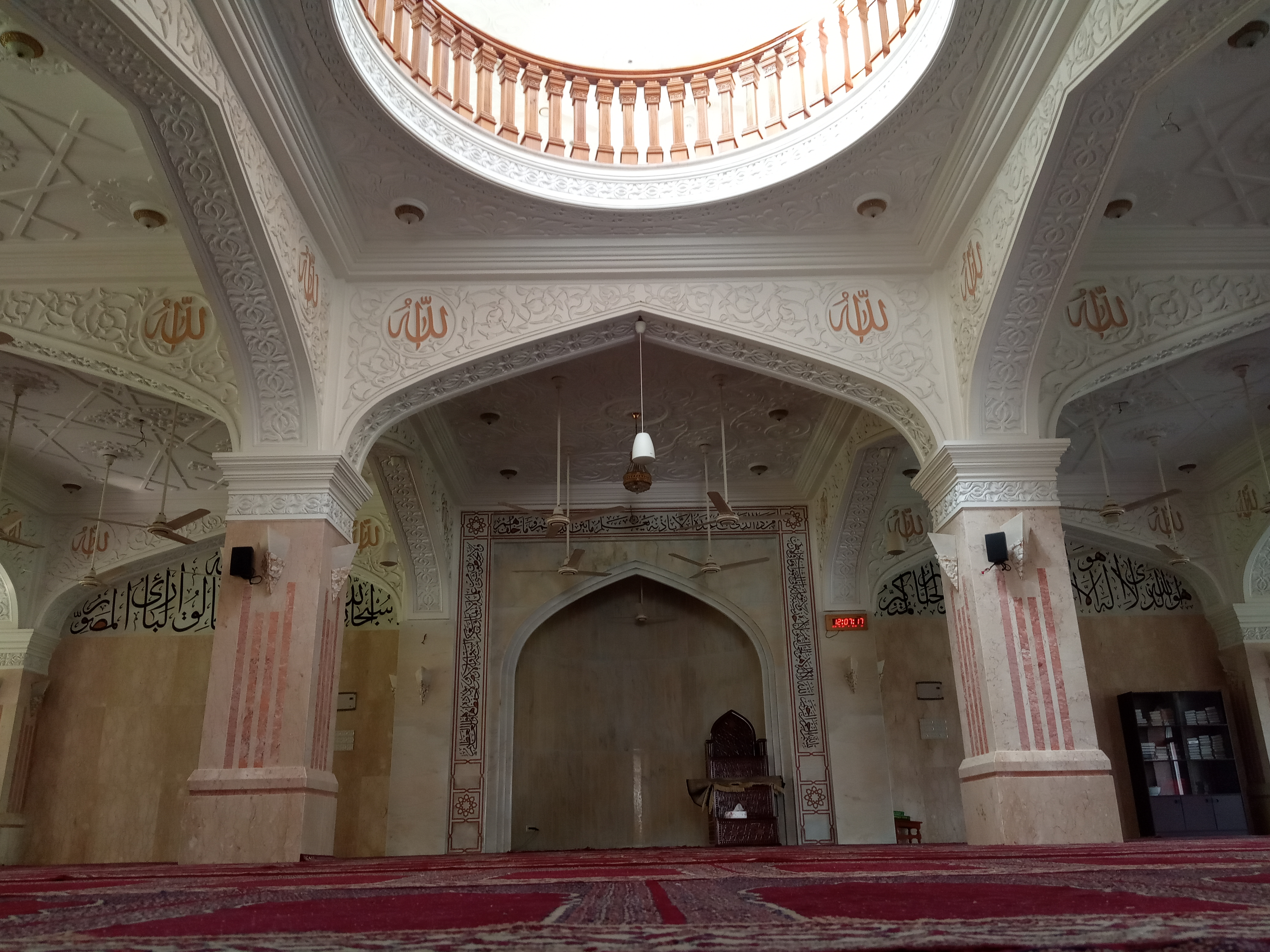
The Haji Abdus Sattar Mosque in Vangnahati, Sreepur.

Gazipur is one of the most popular tourist destinations in Bangladesh. There are several tourist attractions in this area. Most notable are:

- Gazipur Safari Park
- Bhawal National Park
- Nuhash Polli
- Bhadun
- Nagari Church

== Administration ==
Gazipur District upazila geocode map

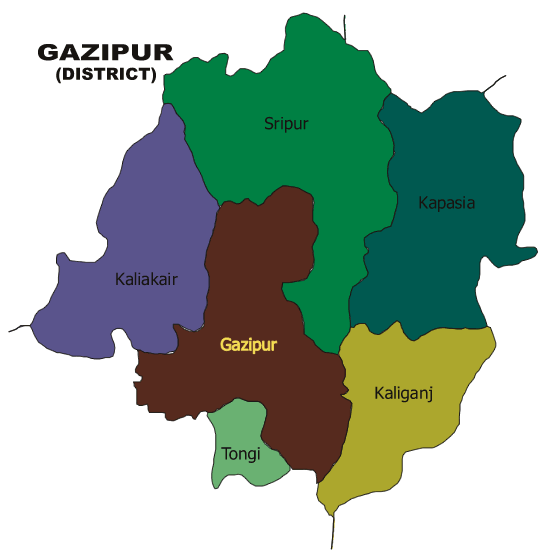
Gazipurs All Sub-Districts

Gazipur District was established in 1984. It has one city corporation, the Gazipur City Corporation, and is divided into the following upazilas:

- Gazipur Sadar Upazila
- Kaliakair Upazila
- Kapasia Upazila
- Sreepur Upazila
- Kaliganj Upazila

Gazipur city has 57 wards. The area of the town is 321.32 km^{2}. The town's population is 2890796; male 52.52%, female 47.48%; density is 2,905 per km^{2}.

- Mayor of Gazipur City Corporation: Jayeda khatun
- Administrator of Zila Parishod: Akhteruzzaman
- Deputy Commissioner: Nurul Islam

== Transport ==
- Dhaka-Tongi diversion road connects Gazipur with Dhaka.
- Dhaka-Savar-Tangail road connects Gazipur With Savar and Manikgonj.
- There are seven railway stations in the Gazipur district.

== Education ==
There are six universities in Gazipur: Dhaka University of Engineering and Technology, Islamic University of Technology, Gazipur Agricultural University (formerly the Institute of Postgraduate Studies on Agriculture), Bangladesh Open University, German University Bangladesh, Bangladesh National University, and Gazipur Digital University.

Establishments such as Gazipur Cantonment College, Bangladesh Rice Research Institute (BRRI), Bangladesh Agricultural Research Institute (BARI) and others are located here.

There are two masters level colleges in the district: Bhawal Badre Alam Government College and Tongi Government College.

There are 19 degree colleges in the district. Honors level colleges include: Kaliakair Degree College, Jatir Pita Bangabandhu Degree College, Kaligonj Sramik College, Kapasia Degree College (founded in 1965), and Kazi Azim Uddin College.

Notable secondary and higher secondary schools include Rani Bilashmoni Government Boys' High School, founded in 1905, Safiuddin Sarker Academy and College, M. E. H. Arif College, Tongi Pilot School & Girls' College, and Mamdee Mollah High School.

The madrasa education system includes 26 fazil and 3 kamil madrasas.

== See also ==
- Districts of Bangladesh
