= Qutubuddin Koka =

Mughal subahdar of Bengal from 1606 to 1607

Shaykh Khubu Qutubuddin Khan Kokah

10th Subahdar of Bengal
- In office 2 September 1606 – 20 May 1607
- Monarch: Jahangir
- Preceded by: Man Singh I
- Succeeded by: Jahangir Quli Khan

Personal details
- Born: 13 August 1569
- Died: 20 May 1607 (aged 37) Sulaimanabad, Bengal, Mughal Empire
- Relatives: Salim Chishti (grandfather); Mukarram Khan Chishti (nephew); Islam Khan Chishti (cousin)

Shaykh Khūbū (Persian: شیخ خوبو), better known as Quṭb ad-Dīn Khān Kokah (Persian: قطب الدین خان کوکه; 13 August 1569 – 20 May 1607) was the Mughal subahdar (provincial governor) of Bengal Subah during the reign of the emperor Jahangir. He was appointed governor of Bengal on 2 September 1606 and died in office on 20 May 1607.

== Early life and family ==
Qutb-ud-Din Khan Kokah's original name was Shaikh Khubu. His father was a Mughal courtier in the court of emperor Akbar. His mother was daughter of Salim Chishti of Fatehpur Sikri and the foster mother of Emperor Jahangir. The emperor was deeply attached to his foster mother, as reflected by the following paragraph in the Jahangir's memoirs:

In the month Ẕi-l-qa‘da the mother of Qutbu-d-dīn Khān Koka, who had given me her milk and was as a mother to me or even kinder than my own kind mother ... was committed to the mercy of God. I placed the feet of her corpse on my shoulders and carried her a part of the way (to her grave). Through extreme grief and sorrow I had no inclination for some days to eat, and I did not change my clothes.

— Jahangir, Emperor of Hindustan, Tuzuk-i-Jahangiri

Thus, Shaykh Khubu was the Kokah (foster brother) of emperor Jahangir. The title of Qutb-ud-Din Khan was conferred upon him by Prince Salim (Jahangir) during his rebellion against his father Akbar. He was also appointed subahdar of Bihar by prince Salim during his rebellion.

== Subahdar of Bengal ==
Qutb-ud-Din Khan Kokah was appointed the governor of Bengal in 1606. Eight months later, he led the Mughal forces in a battle against Sher Afghan Quli Khan, the Faujdar of Bardhaman. Qutb-ud-Din Khan Kokah was defeated and killed in that battle.

== Progeny ==
Qutbuddin Khan Kokah had two sons. His first son, Saaduddin Khan received the title Saaduddin Siddiqi and was granted by emperor Jahangir three jagirs called Amenabad, Talebabad and Chandrapratap (now in Gazipur District, Bangladesh). This became the Bangladesh branch of his family. His descendants in Bangladesh include Chowdhury Kazemuddin Ahmed Siddiky, the co-founder of the Assam Bengal Muslim League and the University of Dhaka, Justice Badruddin Ahmed Siddiky, Chowdhury Tanbir Ahmed Siddiky, the Commerce Minister of Bangladesh (1979–81) and Chowdhury Irad Ahmed Siddiky, a candidate for the mayor of Dhaka in 2015.

His second son, Shaykh Ibrahim, received the title of Kishwar Khan and Muhtashim Khan, and was appointed Qiladar (Commandant) of the Rohtas Fort in Bihar. Shaikh Ibrahim was married to Parwar Khanam, the daughter of Asaf Khan (the Grand Vizier of Mughal Empire 1628-41[2]) and sister of Mumtaz Mahal (Empress consort of the Mughal Emperor Shah Jahan and niece of empress Nur Jahan, Jahangir's favorite wife). Shaikh Ibrahim aka Mohtashim Khan was given a jagir of 22 villages in Sheikhupur, Badaun and it is here he built a fort for his family, where his descendants still live to this day. This is the Indian branch of Koka's family, and their descendants include Nawab Abdul-Ghaffar Khan Bahadur, jageerdar of Sheikhupur, Begum Parveen Azad - a senior Indian Congress party politician [the 11th Lok Sabha (1996) Congress-party candidate from Baduan], other relatives include Mohammad Sultan Hyder 'Josh'- a prominent poet and short story writer of Urdu and Abida Ahmed wife of the 5th President of India Fakhruddin Ali Ahmed.

== Popular culture ==
=== Films and television ===
- In the 2014 historical drama series Siyaasat aired on The EPIC Channel, he is portrayed by Kavin Dave.

Preceded by Man Singh I	Subahdar of Bengal; 1606–1607	Succeeded by Jahangir Quli Beg

== See also ==
- List of rulers of Bengal
- History of Bengal
