= Salim Chishti =

Sufi saint of the Chishti Order during the Mughal Empire in India (1478–1572)

Sheikh Salim Chishti
- شیخ سلیم چشتی
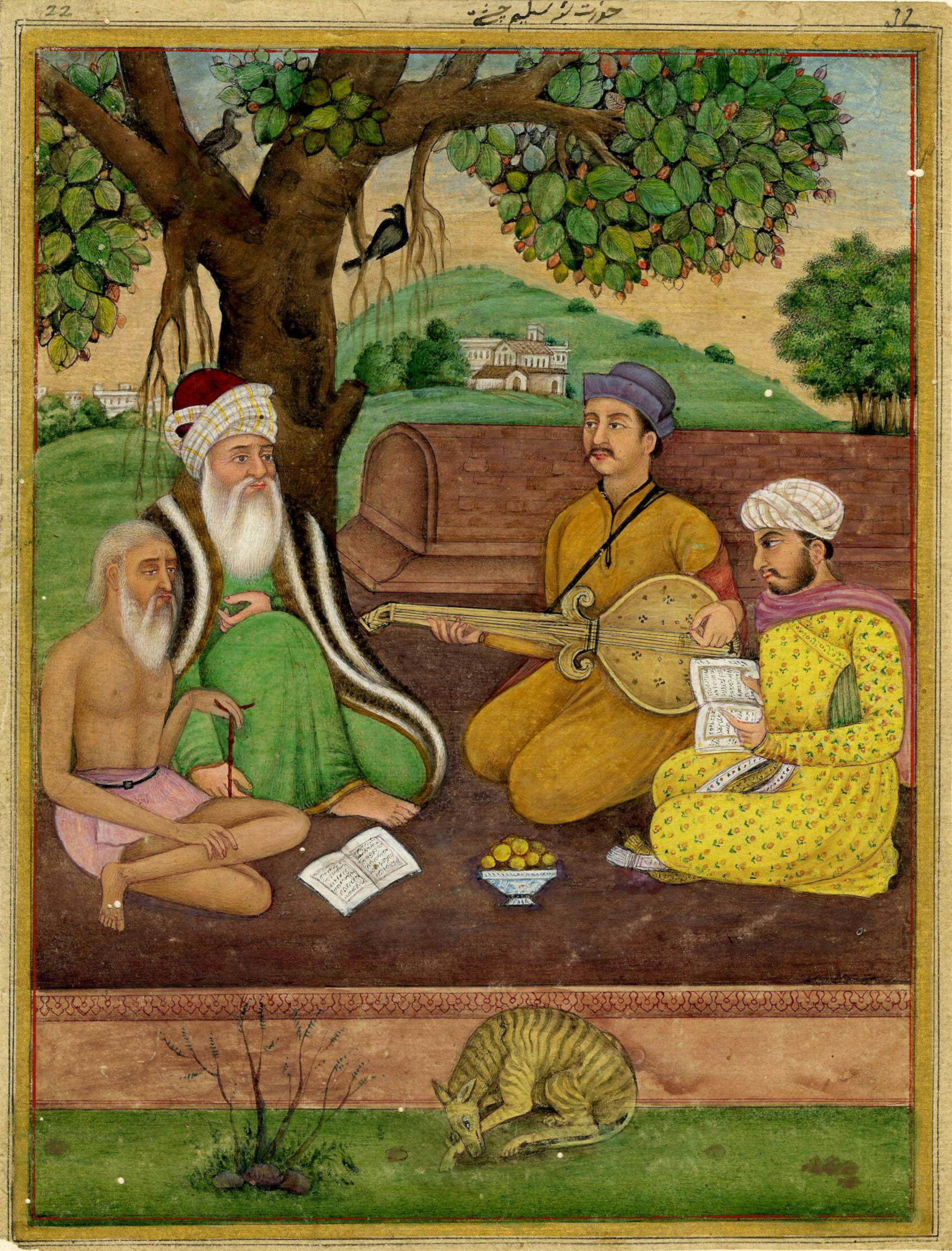

Personal life
- Born: 1478 Delhi, Delhi Sultanate
- Died: 1572 (aged 93–94) Fatehpur Sikri, Agra Subah, Mughal Empire
- Relatives: Baba Farid (grandfather) Sheikh Musa (nephew) Sheikh Islam Khan Chishti (grandson)

Religious life
- Religion: Islam
- Denomination: Sunni
- Tariqa: Chishti

Muslim leader
- Influenced: Akbar

Sheikh Salim Chishti (Urdu: شیخ سلیم چشتی, 1478–1572) also known as Sheikh al- Hind was a Sufi saint of the Chishti Order and one of the most revered Sufi saints during the Mughal Empire in India.

== Biography ==
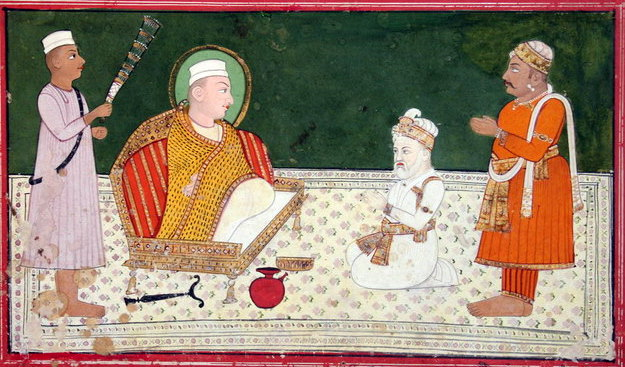
Shaikh Salím Chishtí with Mughal Emperor Akbar

Sheikh Salim Chishti was a descendant of Sheikh Farid, a Punjabi Sunni Muslim preacher and mystic.

The Mughal Emperor Akbar came to Chishti's home in Sikri to ask him to pray for a male heir to the throne. Chishti blessed Akbar, and after a year, one of the first of three sons was born to him and the queen Mariam-uz-Zamani. Akbar named his first son 'Salim' (later emperor Jahangir). In 1569, Akbar began the construction of a religious compound to commemorate the Shaikh. After Jahangir's second birthday, he began the construction of a walled city and imperial palace at the same site. The city came to be known as Fatehpur Sikri, the "City of Victory", after Akbar's victorious Gujarat campaign in 1573.

A daughter of Sheikh Salim Chishti was the foster mother of Emperor Jahangir. The emperor was deeply attached to his foster mother, as reflected in the Jahangirnama and he was extremely close to her son Qutb-ud-din Khan Koka who was made the governor of Bengal and Orissa.

His eldest son, Saaduddin Khan, was ennobled Saaduddin Siddique and was granted three jagirs in the Gazipur District of Amenabad, Talebabad and Chandrapratap. Currently, his great grandson Kursheed Aleem Chishti lives there and is the 16th generation of Salim Chishti. These descendants in Bangladesh include Chowdhury Kazemuddin Ahmed Siddiky, the co-founder of the Assam Bengal Muslim League and the University of Dhaka; Justice Badruddin Ahmed Siddiky; Chowdhury Tanbir Ahmed Siddiky, the Commerce Minister of Bangladesh;and Chowdhury Irad Ahmed Siddiky, an anti-corruption activist and candidate for the Mayor of Dhaka in 2015. The descendant of his second-eldest son, Shaikh Ibrahim, was granted the title Kishwar Khan and now reside in Sheikhupur, Badaun in India.

== Salim Chishti Tomb ==
The Tomb of Salim Chishti is a mausoleum locating within the quadrangle of the Jama Masjid in Fatehpur Sikri, Uttar Pradesh, India. The mausoleum was built during the years 1580 and 1581 by Akbar, along with the imperial complex at Fatehpur Sikri near Zenana Rauza. It was constructed as a mark of his respect for Salim Chisti, who foretold the birth of Akbar's son (named Prince Salim after Salim Chisti), who succeeded Akbar to the throne of the Mughal Empire. The tomb was inscribed on the UNESCO World Heritage List in 1986.

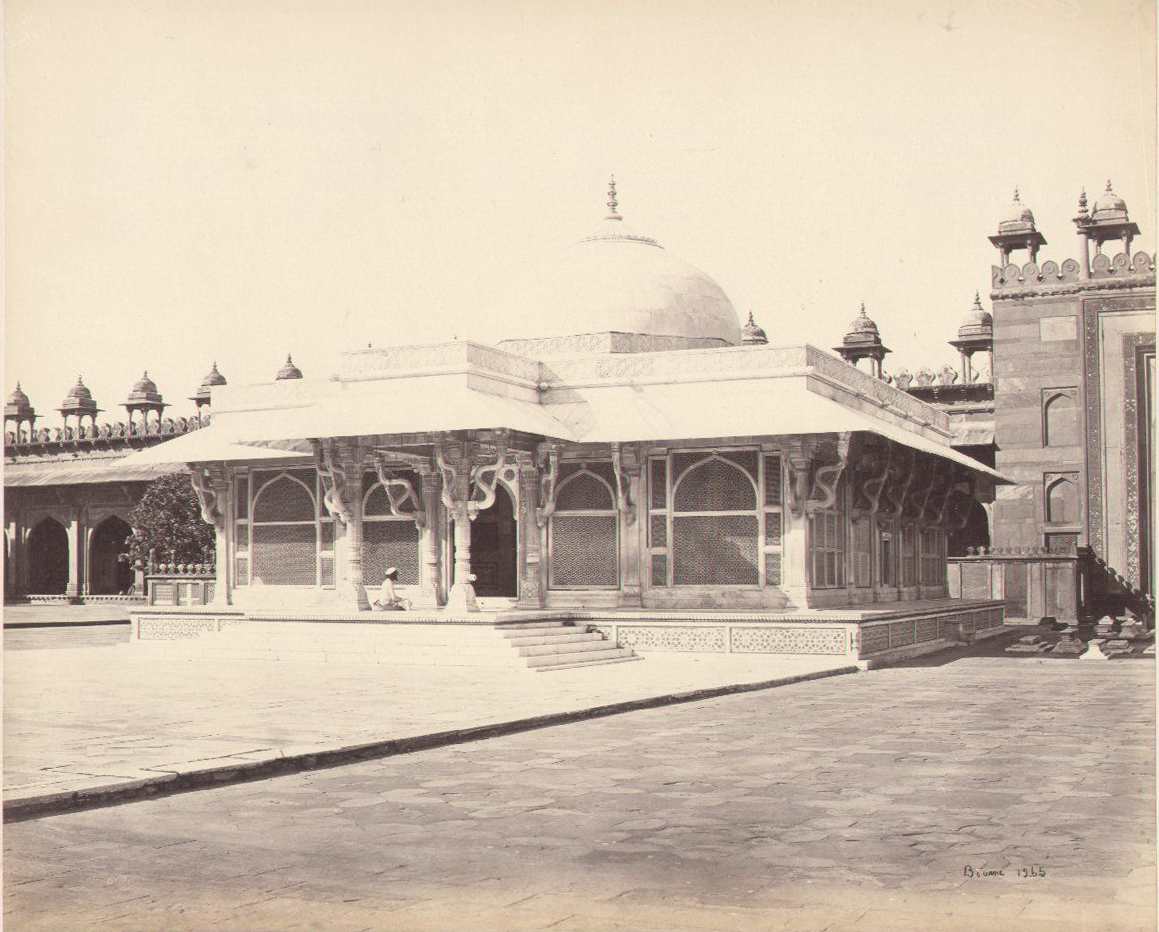
Salim Chishti Tomb taken by Samuel Bourne in 1865

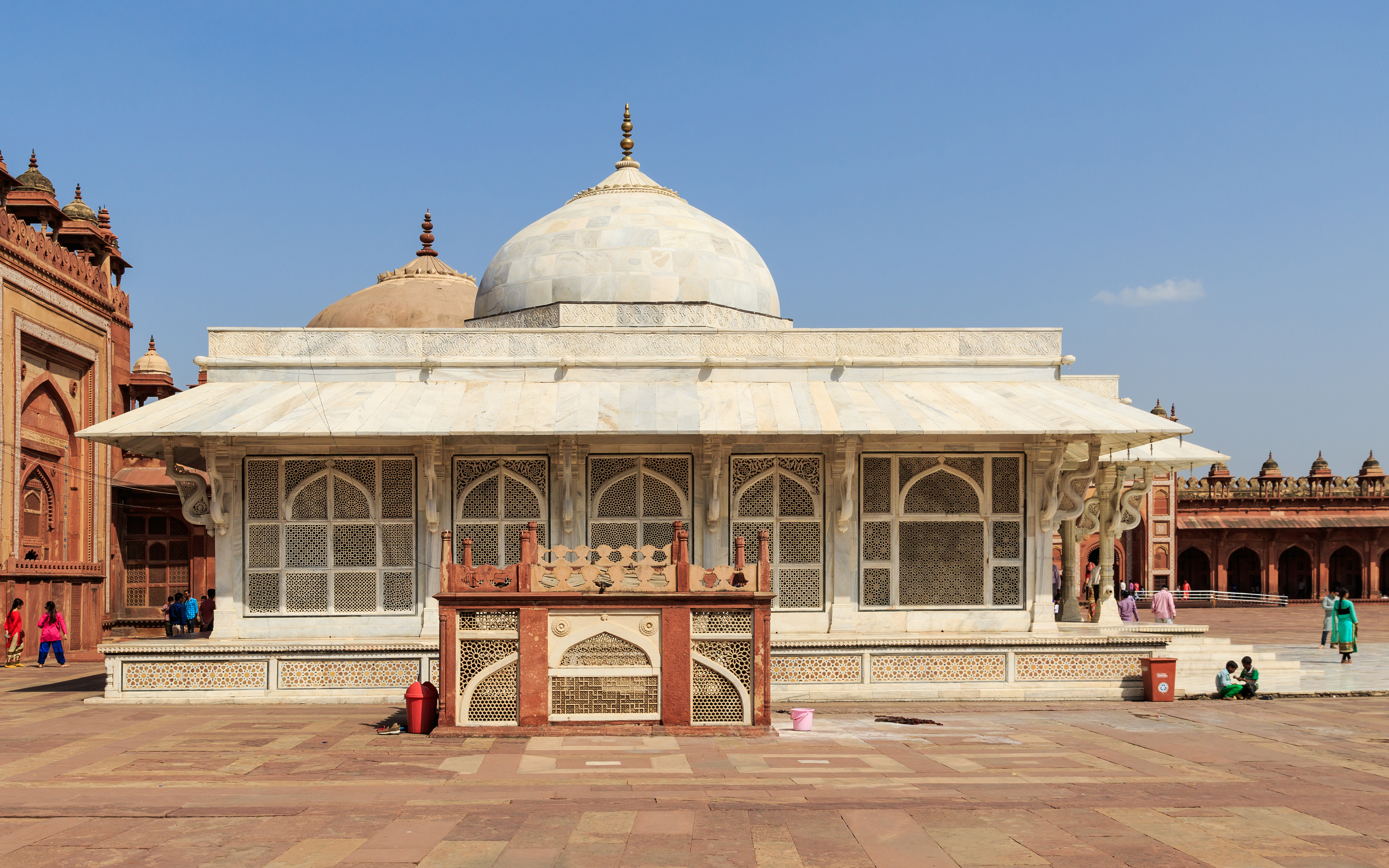
Another view of Salim Chishti Shrine

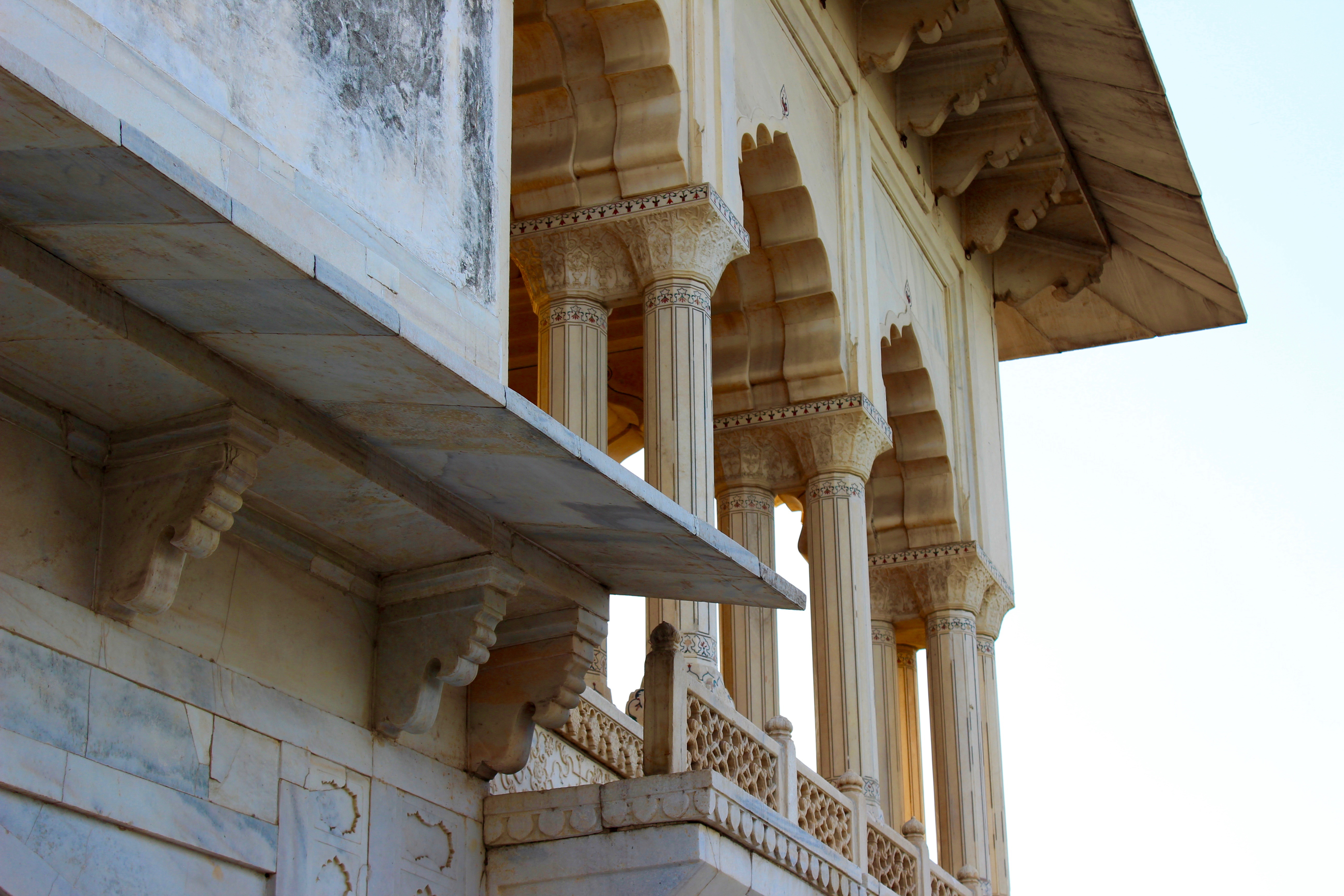
Fatehpur Sikri: Salim Chishti's Tomb

== See also ==
- Islam Khan I (grandson)
- Islam Khan V
- Mukarram Khan, great-grandson
- Sheikhupur, Badaun
- Qutubuddin Koka
