= Mokhlesur Rahman (Gazipur politician) =

Bangladeshi politician

- মোখলেসুর রহমান জিতু মিয়া

Member of Parliament for Dhaka-23
- In office 12 February 1982 – 18 February 1979

Member of Parliament for Gazipur-3
- In office 3 March 1988 – 6 December 1990

Personal details
- Born: Mokhlesur Rahman Jitu Mia unknown Kaliganj, Gazipur
- Died: unknown Kaliganj, Gazipur
- Party: Bangladesh Nationalist Party

Mokhlesur Rahman (Bengali: মোখলেসুর রহমান জিতু মিয়া) was a Bangladeshi politician. He was a Member of Parliament of the then Dhaka-23 and Gazipur-3 Constituency.

== Early life ==
Mokhlesur Rahman was born in Kaliganj, Gazipur.

== Career ==
Mokhlesur Rahman Jitu Mia was elected as the chairman of the then Kaliganj Sadar Union in 1973.

In 1979, he was elected Member of Parliament from the then Dhaka-23 constituency as a candidate of the Bangladesh Nationalist Party in the second parliamentary election of 1979.

As the BNP did not participate in the 1988 fourth national parliamentary election, he was elected as a member of parliament from the then Gazipur-3 seat as an independent candidate.

== Death ==
Mokhlesur Rahman Jitu Mia passed away.
