= Moyez Uddin =

Bangladeshi politician

- ময়েজ উদ্দিন

Member of Parliament
- In office 1973–1984

Personal details
- Born: 17 March 1930; Gazipur, Bengal Presidency, British India
- Died: 27 September 1984 (aged 54); Gazipur, Bangladesh
- Political party: Bangladesh Awami League
- Children: Meher Afroz Chumki

Moyez Uddin (17 March 1930 – 27 September 1984) was a Bangladesh Awami League politician and a Jatiya Sangsad member.

== Early life ==
Uddin was born on 17 March 1930 in Barahara, Kaligonj upazilla, Gazipur District, East Bengal, British India. In 1955, he graduated from University of Dhaka with a master's degree. He later earned a law degree from the University of Dhaka and started working as a lawyer.

== Career ==
Uddin was involved with Awami League from the very beginning of the party and was a close associate of Sheikh Mujibur Rahman. He was the convenor of Agartala Conspiracy case committee. He served as the General Secretary of the greater Dhaka District unit of Bangladesh Awami League. He was a member of the Mukti Bahini and fought in the Bangladesh Liberation war. He was elected to Parliament from Kaliganj as a Bangladesh Awami League candidate in 1973. He served as the vice-president of Bangladesh Red Cross Society from 1977 to 1984.

== Personal life ==
Uddin's daughter, Meher Afroz Chumki, was elected to Parliament in 1996 and 2008, and has served as the State Minister for Women and Children Affair.

== Death and legacy ==
Uddin was killed on 27 September 1984 by a criminal group led by Azam Khan in Kaliganj while he was leading a protest against military dictator, General Hussain Mohammad Ershad. Mohammad Shahidullah was sentenced to 14 years imprisonment for his murder but was pardoned by President Hussain Mohammad Ershad. He later joined Bangladesh Nationalist Party. Ershad pardoned Azam Khan as well and introduced him at a rally as his brother. Khan retired from politics in 2022.

On 9 June 1999, Prime Minister Sheikh Hasina of Bangladesh Awami League laid the foundation stone of Shaheed Moyez Uddin Ahmed bridge over Shitalakkhya River. On 28 February 2006, Prime Minister Khaleda Zia of Bangladesh Nationalist Party inaugurated the bridge but removing Moyez Uddin's name from the bridge. This was protested by Bangladesh Awami League, then the opposition party.
