= St. Nicholas of Tolentino Church =

The following cathedrals, churches and chapels are dedicated to Nicholas of Tolentino:

== Bangladesh ==
- Nagari Church

== Philippines ==
- Guimbal Church
- Recoletos Church
- San Nicolas de Tolentino Church (Macabebe)
- San Nicolas de Tolentino Parish Church (Quezon City)

== United States ==
- St. Nicholas of Tolentine Church (Bronx)
- St. Nicholas of Tolentine Church, New Jersey
