= Rumana Ali =

Bangladeshi politician

- রুমানা আলী
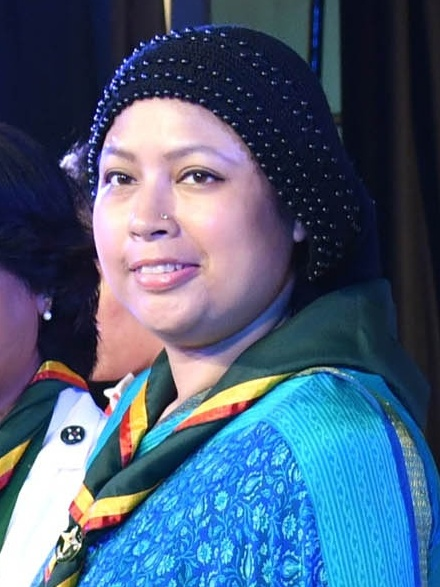
- Ali in Dhaka (2024)

Minister of State for Primary and Mass Education
- In office 11 January 2024 – 6 August 2024
- Prime Minister: Sheikh Hasina
- Preceded by: Md Zakir Hossain
- Succeeded by: Bobby Hajjaj

Member of the Bangladesh Parliament for Gazipur-3
- In office 30 January 2024 – 6 August 2024
- Preceded by: Iqbal Hossain Sabuj
- Succeeded by: S. M. Rafiqul Islam

Member of the Bangladesh Parliament for Reserved Women's Seat-14
- In office 20 February 2019 – 6 January 2019
- Preceded by: Lutfun Nesa

Personal details
- Born: 14 March 1976 (age 50) Gazipur, Bangladesh
- Party: Bangladesh Awami League
- Parent: Md. Rahmat Ali (father)
- Relatives: M. Zahid Hasan (brother)
- Education: BA, MA

Rumana Ali Tusi is a Bangladeshi academic, writer and politician from Gazipur belonging to Bangladesh Awami League. She is a former state minister for Primary and Mass Education and a former Jatiya Sangsad member representing the Gazipur-3 constituency. Earlier, she was Jatiya Sangsad member for Reserved Women's Seat-14. She is ex-state minister Md. Rahmat Ali's daughter. Her eldest brother M. Zahid Hasan is a well known physicist at Princeton University.

== Biography ==
Ali was a teacher of New Model University College, Dhaka. She also wrote a book titled Prachin Kirti O Oitihasik Sthan.

Ali was elected as a member of the Jatiya Sangsad from Reserved Women's Seat-14 on 16 February 2019.

== Political career ==
Awami League-nominated Rumana won the Gazipur-3 seat in the 12th National Parliament election on 7 January 2024.
