= Md. Hase Uddin Dewan =

Bangladeshi politician

Md. Hasi Uddin Dewan

Member of Bangladesh Parliament
- In office 1986–1988
- Succeeded by: Md. Mokhlesur Rahman

Personal details
- Died: 26/09/1995 Kaliganj, Gazipur
- Party: Jatiya Party (Ershad)

Md. Hasi Uddin Dewan is a Jatiya Party (Ershad) politician and a former member of parliament for Gazipur-3.

== Career ==
Dewan was elected to parliament for Gazipur-3 constituency as a candidate of National Party in the 1986 third national parliament election. He was the Kaliganj Upazila Parishad chairman.
