= S. M. Rafiqul Islam =

Bangladeshi politician

S. M. Rafiqul Islam Bacchu

Member of the Bangladesh Parliament for Gazipur-3
- Incumbent
- Assumed office 12 February 2026
- Preceded by: Rumana Ali

Personal details
- Born: Sreepur, Gazipur
- Party: Bangladesh Nationalist Party
- Occupation: Physician and politician

S. M. Rafiqul Islam is a Bangladesh Nationalist Party politician and an incumbent member of parliament for Gazipur-3.
