= Iqbal Hossain Sabuj =

Bangladeshi politician

- ইকবাল হোসেন সবুজ

Member of Parliament for Gazipur-3
- In office 25 January 2019 – 7 January 2024
- Prime Minister: Sheikh Hasina
- Preceded by: Md. Rahamat Ali
- Succeeded by: Rumana Ali

General Secretary of Gazipur District Awami League

Personal details
- Born: Mohammad Iqbal Hossain; 12 August 1974 (age 51) Damdama, Prahladpur, Sreepur, Gazipur, Bangladesh
- Party: Bangladesh Awami League
- Education: Graduation
- Occupation: Politician; Business
- Nickname: Sabuj

Ikbal Hossain Sabuj (Born: 12 August 1974) is a Bangladesh Awami League politician and former Jatiya Sangsad member from the Gazipur-3 constituency.

== Birth and education ==
Sabuj was born on 12 August 1974 in Damdama village of Gazipur Sreepur Upazila, Gazipur Prahladpur. His father Ismail Hossain Bagmar was a farmer.

He passed secondary school at Rani Bilashmoni Government Boys' High School and graduated from Bhawal Badre Alam Government College in Jaidevpur

== Political career ==
Iqbal Hossain Sabuj was active in student politics. He was a member of the Central Committee of Chhatra League and was the VP of Bhawal Badre Alam Government College student council. Jubilee central executive committee member and Gazipur district Awami League served as organizational secretary.

In 2009, he was elected chairman of Sreepur Upazila, Gazipur.

He is the General Secretary of the Gazipur District Awami League In the 2018 11th National Parliament Election, he was elected Member of Parliament from Gazipur-3 constituency as an Awami League candidate.

On 7 January 2024, in the Twelfth National Parliament Election, he was defeated by Rumana Ali as an independent candidate without getting the party nomination of Bangladesh Awami League.
