= Gazipur-3 =

Constituency of Bangladesh's Jatiya Sangsad

Coordinates: 24.20°N 90.47°E

- Constituency for the Jatiya Sangsad
- District: Gazipur District
- Division: Dhaka Division
- Electorate: 527,360 (2026)

Current constituency
- Created: 1984
- Party: Bangladesh Nationalist Party
- Member: S. M. Rafiqul Islam
- ← 195 Gazipur-2 197 Gazipur-4 →

Gazipur-3 is a constituency represented in the Jatiya Sangsad (National Parliament) of Bangladesh since 2026 by S. M. Rafiqul Islam of the Bangladesh Nationalist Party.

== Boundaries ==
The constituency encompasses Sreepur Upazila and two union parishads of Gazipur Sadar Upazila: Bhawal Gor and Pirujali.

== History ==
The constituency was created in 1984 from the Dhaka-23 constituency when the former Dhaka District was split into six districts: Manikganj, Munshiganj, Dhaka, Gazipur, Narsingdi, and Narayanganj.

Ahead of the 2008 general election, the Election Commission redrew constituency boundaries to reflect population changes revealed by the 2001 Bangladesh census. The 2008 redistricting added a fifth seat to Gazipur District and altered the boundaries of Gazipur-3.

== Members of Parliament ==
Election	Member	Party
1986	Md. Hase Uddin Dewan	Jatiya Party
1988	Mokhlesur Rahman	Independent
1991	Asfar Hossain Mollah	Awami League
Feb 1996	AKM Fazlul Haque Milon	Bangladesh Nationalist Party
Jun 1996	Akhtaruzzaman	Awami League
2001	AKM Fazlul Haque Milon	Bangladesh Nationalist Party
Major Boundary Changes
2008	Rahamat Ali	Awami League
2014	Rahamat Ali	Awami League
2018	Iqbal Hossain Sabuj	Awami League
2024	Rumana Ali	Awami League
2026	S. M. Rafiqul Islam	Bangladesh Nationalist Party

== Elections ==
=== Elections in the 2020s ===
General election 2026: Gazipur-3
Party	Candidate	Votes	%	±%
BNP	S. M. Rafiqul Islam			
BKM	Md. Ehsanul Haque			
Independent	Md. Ejadur Rahman Chowdhury			
IAB	Alamgir Hossain			
Majority				
Turnout				
Registered electors		527,360		
BNP gain from AL				

Awami League nominated candidate Rumana Ali won the seat in the 12th National Parliament election on 7 January 2024.

=== Elections in the 2010s ===
Rahmat Ali was re-elected unopposed in the 2014 general election after opposition parties withdrew their candidacies in a boycott of the election.

=== Elections in the 2000s ===
General Election 2008: Gazipur-3
Party	Candidate	Votes	%	±%
AL	Rahmat Ali	236,944	67.7	+20.8
BNP	M. A. Mannan	108,915	31.1	−16.2
Zaker Party	Ahmed Ali	1,424	0.4	+0.1
KSJL	Iqbal Siddique	1,235	0.4	N/A
BSD	Zahirul Islam	641	0.2	N/A
BTF	Syed Abu Daud Mosnabi Haidar	377	0.1	N/A
Bangladesh Kalyan Party	K. H. Nazir Ahmed Moktar	231	0.1	N/A
BDB	Md. Azibur Rahman	187	0.1	N/A
Majority		128,029	36.6	+36.3
Turnout		349,954	86.5	+6.1
AL gain from BNP				

General Election 2001: Gazipur-3
Party	Candidate	Votes	%	±%
BNP	AKM Fazlul Haque Milon	58,518	47.3	+14.7
AL	Akhtaruzzaman	58,133	46.9	+9.4
IJOF	Ashraf Khan	6,438	5.2	N/A
Zaker Party	A. B. M. Khalilur Rahman	352	0.3	−1.0
JSD	Md. Ariful Islam Akan	121	0.1	N/A
Independent	Nikolas Rojareo	109	0.1	N/A
Ganatantri Party	Azizul Haq Kanchan	107	0.1	N/A
Jatiya Party (M)	Md. Azam Khan	48	0.0	N/A
Majority		385	0.3	−4.6
Turnout		123,826	80.4	−2.8
BNP gain from AL				

=== Elections in the 1990s ===
General Election June 1996: Gazipur-3
Party	Candidate	Votes	%	±%
AL	Akhtaruzzaman	35,502	37.5	+8.0
BNP	AKM Fazlul Haque Milon	30,834	32.6	+7.1
JP(E)	Khan Md. Azam	19,707	20.8	+12.7
Jamaat	Yusuf Ali	5,602	5.9	−11.4
IOJ	Gazi Ataur Rahman	1,644	1.7	N/A
Zaker Party	Riaz Uddin Ahmed	1,263	1.3	−4.7
FP	Md. Matiur Rahman	75	0.1	N/A
Majority		4,668	4.9	+0.9
Turnout		94,627	83.2	+17.3
AL hold				

General Election 1991: Gazipur-3
Party	Candidate	Votes	%	±%
AL	Asfar Hossain Mollah	30,377	29.5	
BNP	K. M. Habib Zaman	26,233	25.5	
Jamaat	Yusuf Ali	17,769	17.3	
JP(E)	Majnu	8,298	8.1	
Zaker Party	A. B. M. Khalilur Rahman	6,184	6.0	
Independent	Mahiuddin Khan	5,670	5.5	
Independent	A. Aziz Bagmar	4,064	4.0	
Independent	Shahina Khan	1,567	1.5	
BKA	Shihab Uddin	906	0.9	
Bangladesh Muslim League (Matin)	A. Mottalib	870	0.8	
Jatiya Samajtantrik Dal-JSD	Altaf Hossain	466	0.5	
JSD	Abdul Malek	221	0.2	
BAKSAL	Anwar Hossain	185	0.2	
Independent	Afsar Uddin Akond	74	0.1	
Majority		4,144	4.0	
Turnout		102,884	65.9	
AL gain from				
