= Akhtaruzzaman (politician) =

Bangladeshi politician and freedom fighter

- আখতারুজ্জামান

Member of the Bangladesh Parliament
- In office 30 January 2024 – 6 August 2024
- Preceded by: Meher Afroz Chumki
- Succeeded by: AKM Fazlul Haque Milon
- Constituency: Gazipur-5
- In office 14 July 1996 – 13 July 2001
- Preceded by: Asfar Hossain Mollah
- Succeeded by: AKM Fazlul Haque Milon
- Constituency: Gazipur-3

Personal details
- Born: 23 January 1953 (age 73)
- Party: Bangladesh Awami League

Akhtaruzzaman (born 23 January 1953) is a Bangladesh Awami League politician and a former Jatiya Sangsad member representing the Gazipur-5 and Gazipur-3 constituencies.

== Career ==
Akhtaruzzaman was elected to parliament from Gazipur-3 as a Bangladesh Awami League candidate in 1996. He is the chairman of Gazipur District council.

Akhtaruzzaman was nominated as a member of parliament as a candidate of Independent from Gazipur-5 constituency in 2024 twelfth national parliament election.
