= Md. Rahamat Ali =

Bangladeshi politician and lawyer (1945–2020)

- রহমত আলী

State Minister of Local Government, Rural Development and Co-operatives
- In office December 1999 – July 2001

Member of Parliament
- In office 5 March 1991 – 27 October 2006
- Preceded by: Motiur Rahman (Gazipur politician)
- Succeeded by: AKM Mozammel Haque
- Constituency: Gazipur-1
- In office 25 January 2009 – 29 January 2019
- Preceded by: AKM Fazlul Haque Milon
- Succeeded by: Iqbal Hossain Sabuj
- Constituency: Gazipur-3

Personal details
- Born: 16 September 1945
- Died: 16 February 2020 (aged 74) Dhaka, Bangladesh
- Party: Bangladesh Awami League
- Relatives: Rumana Ali (daughter); Adv Jamil Hasan; M. Zahid Hasan (eldest son)
- Education: M.A, L.L.B

Md. Rahamat Ali (16 September 1945 – 16 February 2020) was a Bangladesh Awami League politician and lawyer who was elected as a member of the Jatiya Sangsad from Gazipur-1 and Gazipur-3 constituencies. He was the state minister of Ministry of Local Government, Rural Development and Co-operatives. His daughter Rumana Ali is a member of the Jatiya Sangsad. His eldest son M. Zahid Hasan is a renowned physicist.

== Early life ==
Ali was born on 16 September 1945. He earned Master of Arts and law degrees.

== Career ==
Ali was elected as a member of the Jatiya Sangsad from Gazipur-1 in 1991, 1996 and 2001. Later, he was elected as a member of the Jatiya Sangsad from Gazipur-3 in 2008 and 2014. He also served as the state minister of Ministry of Local Government, Rural Development and Co-operatives from 1999 to 2001. He was the chairman of the parliamentary standing committee on Ministry of Local Government, Rural Development and Co-operatives as well.

== Death ==
Ali died on 16 February 2020 at Square Hospital in Dhaka at the age of 74.
