= Sheikhupur, Badaun =

Sheikhupur
- Town
- Location in Uttar Pradesh, India
- Coordinates: 28.35°N 79.02°E
- Country: India
- State: Uttar Pradesh
- District: Badaun
- Established: 12th century

Government
  - Body: Shekhupur Gram Sabha

Area
  - Total: 13 km^{2} (5.0 sq mi)
- Elevation: 192 m (630 ft)

Population (2011)
  - Total: 44,475
  - Density: 3,400/km^{2} (8,900/sq mi)
- Demonym: metric

Languages
  - Official: Hindi
- Time zone: UTC+5:30 (IST)
- PIN: 243601
- Telephone code: 05832
- Vehicle registration: UP 24

The town of Sautbad, known as Sheikhupur, is about 4 km from the centre of Badaun city across the river Saut, Uttar Pradesh, India and comes under Badaun Metro Area. It is 1 km from Budaun and will be part of the city in one year. The latitude and longitude of Sheikhupur are 28.1 (N) and 79.7' respectively.

The foundation of this historic township was laid more than three centuries ago by Farooqui Faridi Sheikh of Badaun, Shaikh Ibrahim Ali Farooqui aka Nawab Mohtashim Khan. He was the second son of Qutubuddin Koka (foster brother) of emperor Jahangir. Ever since it was founded, Sheikhupur witnessed phases of its rise and fall like any other historic place. Sheikhupur still exists on the map and treasures the memories of its glorious past which helped to shape the history of Mughal India.

== Climate and agriculture ==
The climate of Sheikhupur is the same as its surrounding areas. It is at a higher elevation and by a side of a river. Its soil is excellent for agriculture and crops being cultivated in the surrounding areas are grown here. Being close to Badaun yet at a distance from it, Sheikhupur possesses an identity of its own.

== Transportation ==
Access to Sheikhupur is easy as a railway line passes through it apart from katcha (unmetalled) and pucca (metalled) roads from Badaun. The train from Bareilly to Kasganj hails at Sheikhupur railway station. The Pucca road via Nawshera to Qadar Chowk passes through Sheikhupur and is a busy road through the day. The easiest road to take for Badaun is the Pucca Road running between Mauza Meeran Sarai and Ghalib Patti, going up to river Saut.

== Historic significance ==
Sheikhupur is an area near Badaun, a city in the north-central Uttar Pradesh state of northern India. It is inhabited by Faridi branch of Farooqi Sheikhs. In the reign of Emperor Akbar the Farooqi Sheikhs became connected with the Mughal Empire. Its first member was Sheikh Salim Chishti, whose tomb at Fatehpur Sikri near Agra was built at the expense of the State. His grandson Nawab Qutubuddin Koka was the foster brother and private secretary of Emperor Jahangir and later governor of Bengal in the Mughal Empire. Nawab Qutbuddin Koka's second son Shaikh Ibrahim Ali Farooqui titled Kishwar Khan - aka Nawab Mohtashim Khan was granted by emperor Jahangir a jagir of 4,000 bighas of land in Badaun District (United Provinces) where he built a small fort named Sheikhupur after Jahangir, who was caned Sheikhu-baba in his childhood. He was married to Parwar Khanam daughter of Asaf Khan IV (the Grand Vizier of Mughal Empire 1628-41) and sister of Mumtaz Mahal (Empress consort of the Mughal Emperor Shah Jahan). Nawab Mohtashim Khan and Parwar Khanum's grand mausoleum still stands in Sheikhupur to this day housing their graves.

The jagir of 4000 bigha and 22 villages granted to Nawab Mohtashim Khan by Emperor Jahangir was further maintained and reinstated during the reigns of Emperor Shah Jahan and Alamgir in the Badaun district. The descendants of Nawab Mohtashim Khan and Parwar Khanum live to this day in Sheikhupur (Badaun district), Bareilly (Uttar Pradesh) and have spread to Eastern Uttar Pradesh in Fatehpur.

== Demographics ==
Since it is the largest locality of the Metro Area of Badaun, it has a population of 47,445 of which 24,430 are male and 23,015 are female. Shekhupur has a literacy rate of 64%.

Religions in Shekhupur
Religion	Percent
Hindus	45%
Muslims	54%
Others†	1%
Distribution of religions †Includes Sikhs (0.01%), Buddhists (0.02%), Not stated 0.06%

== Development ==
Soon, Sheikhpur will be added to the city of Budaun and its Railway Station would be Budaun Junction.

== Notable people and families ==
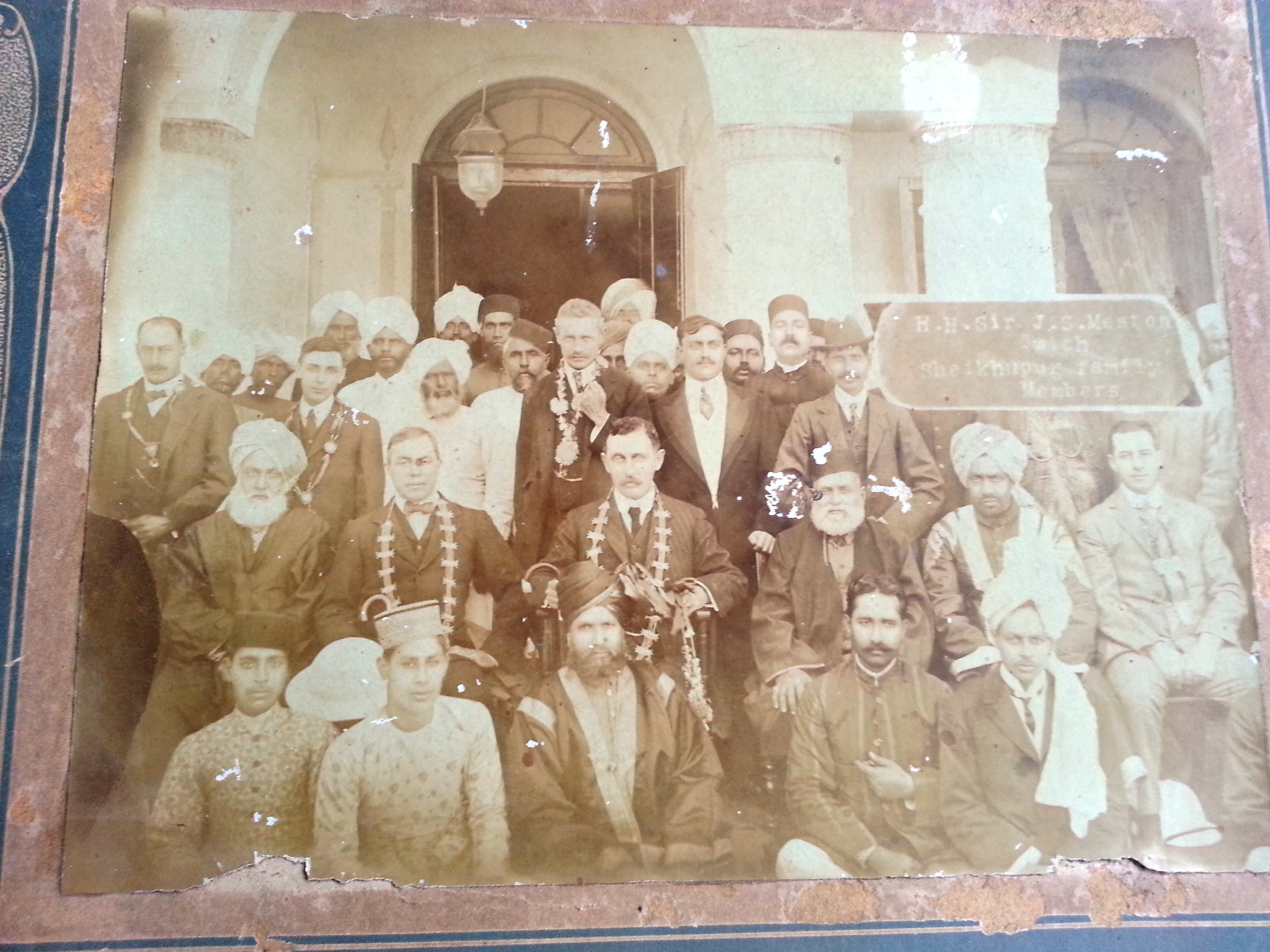
Taken in the late-1800s, this photo shows the visit of James Meston, 1st Baron Meston, to Nawab Abdul-Ghaffar Khan Bahadur and his family in Sheikhupur

- Nawab Abdul-Ghaffar Khan Bahadur, Jagirdar of Sheikhupur – was a descendant of Nawab Qutubuddin Khan Koka, nearly 10 generations since the rule of Emperor Jahangir. He was also a direct descendant of great Sufis including Fariduddin Ganjshakar and Sheikh Salim Chishti. During the First War of Independence, they allied with British, rendering many useful services to the Government of India by giving refuge to senior British government officials during the troubled period. For his services, he was rewarded extensive land in the Badaun and Sheikhupur area, and was thanked with his family by a visit from James Meston, 1st Baron Meston, who later served as the Lieutenant-Governor of the United Provinces of Agra and Oudh.
- Hakim Ghulam Najaf Khan - physician and royal courtier in the court of the last Mughal Emperor Bahadur Shah Zafar. The emperor bestowed the title of Azaz-ud-daula Bahadur for his service to the royal household.
- Sultan Haider 'Josh' - poet and one of the first short story writers of Urdu
- Abida Ahmed - wife of the 5th President of India Fakhruddin Ali Ahmed</ref>
- Maulana Sheikh Waheed Ahmad Masood- was a Poet, Writer, Journalist- Monthly "Naqeeb" and Daily "Zindagi", Parliament Secretary Industries, HMD U.P. Government and Whip of the Legislative Council, On 15.Aug.1947, Union Jack (British Flag) was thrown off by him and he was the person who firstly hoisted the Tiranga in Police Ground Budaun.
- Khan Bahadur Syed Mohammad Alies Maiku Mian-was the Elder brother of Maulana Sheikh Waheed Ahmad Masood- The First District (Budaun) President of All India Congress Committee-1922, He was Also a Freedom Fighter and writer, And also a trustee of H.S.I.I. College Budaun.
- Sheikh Mohabbe Ahmad Masood- was the Younger Brother of Maulana Sheikh Waheed Ahmad Masood- He was also a trustee of H.S.I.I. College Budaun, And Social Worker.
- Ikram Uddin Haider- was Pradhan Gram Sabha Sheikhupur and Manager of H.S.I.I. College Budaun Till his death.
- Dr. Hazrat Sheikh Anees Ahmad Faridi- Son of Maulana Sheikh Waheed Ahmad Masood- Sufi And Social Worker.
- Hazrat Haseen Ahmad Faridi (Khwaja)-Grand Son of Maulana Sheikh Waheed Ahmad Masood And Son of Dr. Hazrat Sheikh Anees Ahmad Faridi, Journalist-(Urdu Monthly Magazine Naam-o-Nishan, Hifazat-E-Aman Urdu Hindi English Weekly, Aman Sandesh Weekly), Poet, Writer And Social Worker, Manager Madarsa-E-Faridi. He presently lives in a part of Sheikhupur Qila Named Anees Manzil Alies Masood Mahal with his Wife Ghazala Mukhtar And two children- Khwaja Tooba Faridi And Khwaja Mamoon Faridi.
- Seema Faridi Shehzadi Khwaja-The Grand Daughter of Maulana Sheikh Waheed Ahmad Masood And Daughter of Dr. Hazrat Sheikh Anees Ahmad Faridi was a great poetess (Manzar Mausam Khwab, Barq Barf Aaina)
- Khwaja Saima Faridi- The Grand Daughter of Maulana Sheikh Waheed Ahmad Masood And Daughter of Dr. Hazrat Sheikh Anees Ahmad Faridi- is a Social Worker.
