= Saint Nicholas High School =

Catholic secondary school in Bangladesh

Coordinates: 23.9137°N 90.5085°E

Information
- Religious affiliation: Catholicism
- Established: 1920; 106 years ago

Saint Nicholas High School is Catholic secondary school founded in 1920 by the Congregation of Holy Cross in Nagori, in Bengal (now Kaliganj Upazila, Gazipur District, Bangladesh).

Saint Nicholas High School
