= Jahangir Quli Beg =

Mughal Subahdar of Bihar (1605–1607) and Bengal (1607–1608)

باز بهادر; Bāz Bahādur; Jahangir Quli Khan
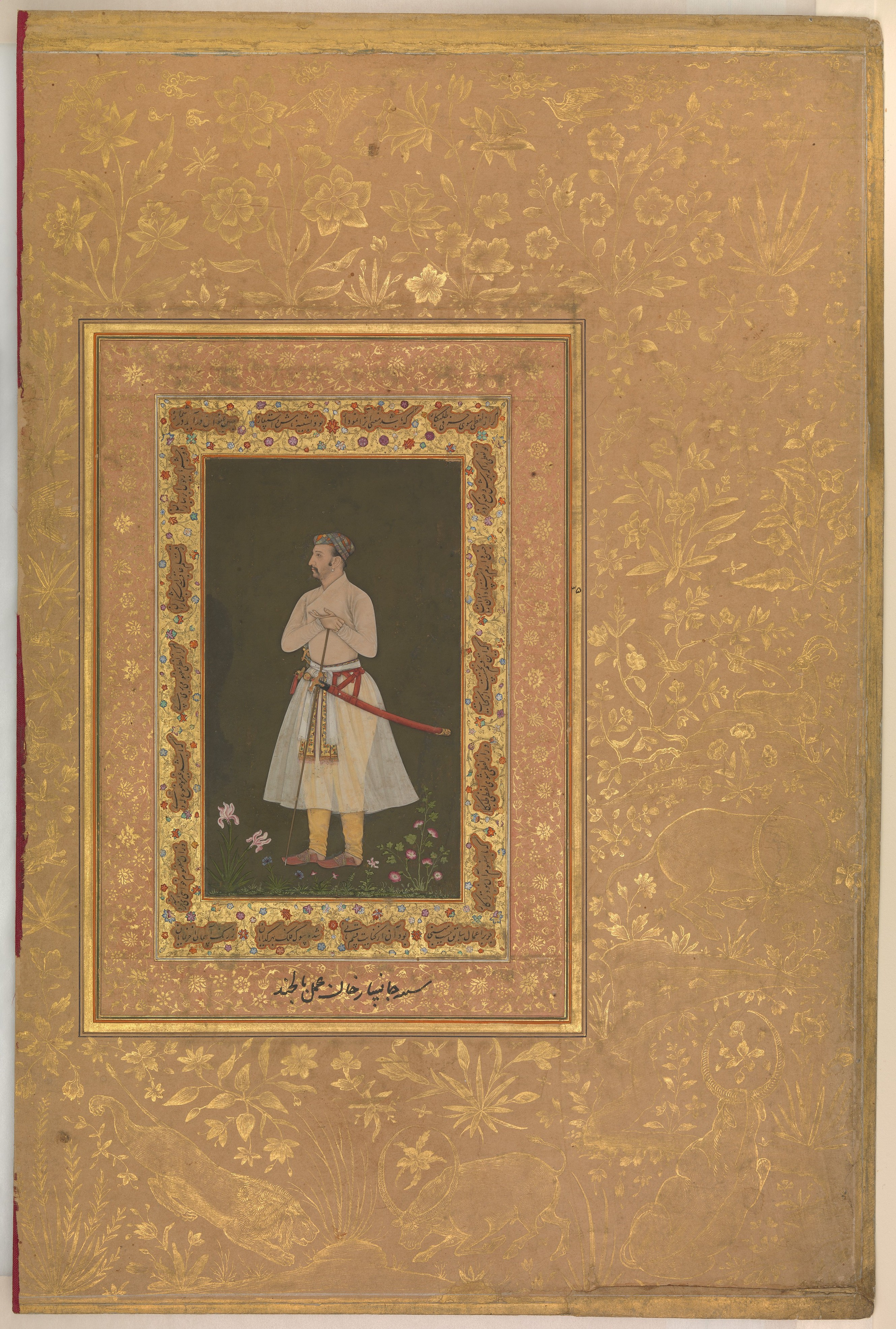
- Monarch: Jahangir

Subahdar of Bihar
- In office 1605–1607

11th Subahdar of Bengal
- In office 20 May 1607 – 10 June 1608
- Preceded by: Qutubuddin Khan
- Succeeded by: Islam Khan I

Personal details
- Born: Lalah Baig
- Died: 1608 Jahangirabad, Bengal, Mughal Empire
- Parent: Nizam (father)

Lālah Beg (Persian: لاله بیگ), better known as Jahāngīr Qulī Beg and later as Jahāngīr Qulī Khān (Persian: جهانگیر قلي خان), was the Subahdar (governor) of Bihar from 1605 to 1607 and the subahdar of Bengal in 1607 and 1608, during the reign of Mughal emperor Jahangir.

== Early life ==
Beg was born into a family of Muslim Persianate Turks. His father, Nizam, served as a librarian for the Mughal emperor Humayun.

== Career ==
At a young age, Beg became the personal servant of Mirza Muhammad Hakim, the second son of emperor Humayun. He then served under Prince Salim (later known as Emperor Jahangir) during the reign of emperor Akbar. From then on, Lalah became known as Jahangir Quli (Jahangir's coolie/servant) and was also given the title of Baz Bahadur. His title was also later upgraded from Baig to Khan, thus becoming known as Jahangir Quli Khan.

Beg rose through the ranks, from becoming a mansabdar of 1500 to that of 4000 horses as well as the Governor of Bihar, within a month of Jahangir's accession to the throne. Following the death of Qutubuddin Koka, Beg was appointed as the next Subahdar of Bengal and became a mansabdar of 5000 personal and horse.

== Death and legacy ==
Being already in his advanced age, he suffered from illness due to the climate of the Bengal province. Consequently, he died within a year of his office. The thanadars (locality officers) that Beg had appointed in Orissa subsequently returned to Akbarnagar, leaving the Governor of Orissa Hashim Khan (son of Qasim Khan Chishti) on his own for a while. These officers were later ordered to return to Orissa during the office of Subahdar Islam Khan I, and all returned on time except Raja Kalyan (son of Todar Mal).

Preceded by Qutubuddin Koka	Subahdar of Bengal; 1607–1608	Succeeded by Islam Khan I

== See also ==
- List of rulers of Bengal
- History of Bengal
- History of Bangladesh
- History of India
