= Bihar Subah =

Subdivision of the Mughal Empire between 1575–1733

- 1575–1733
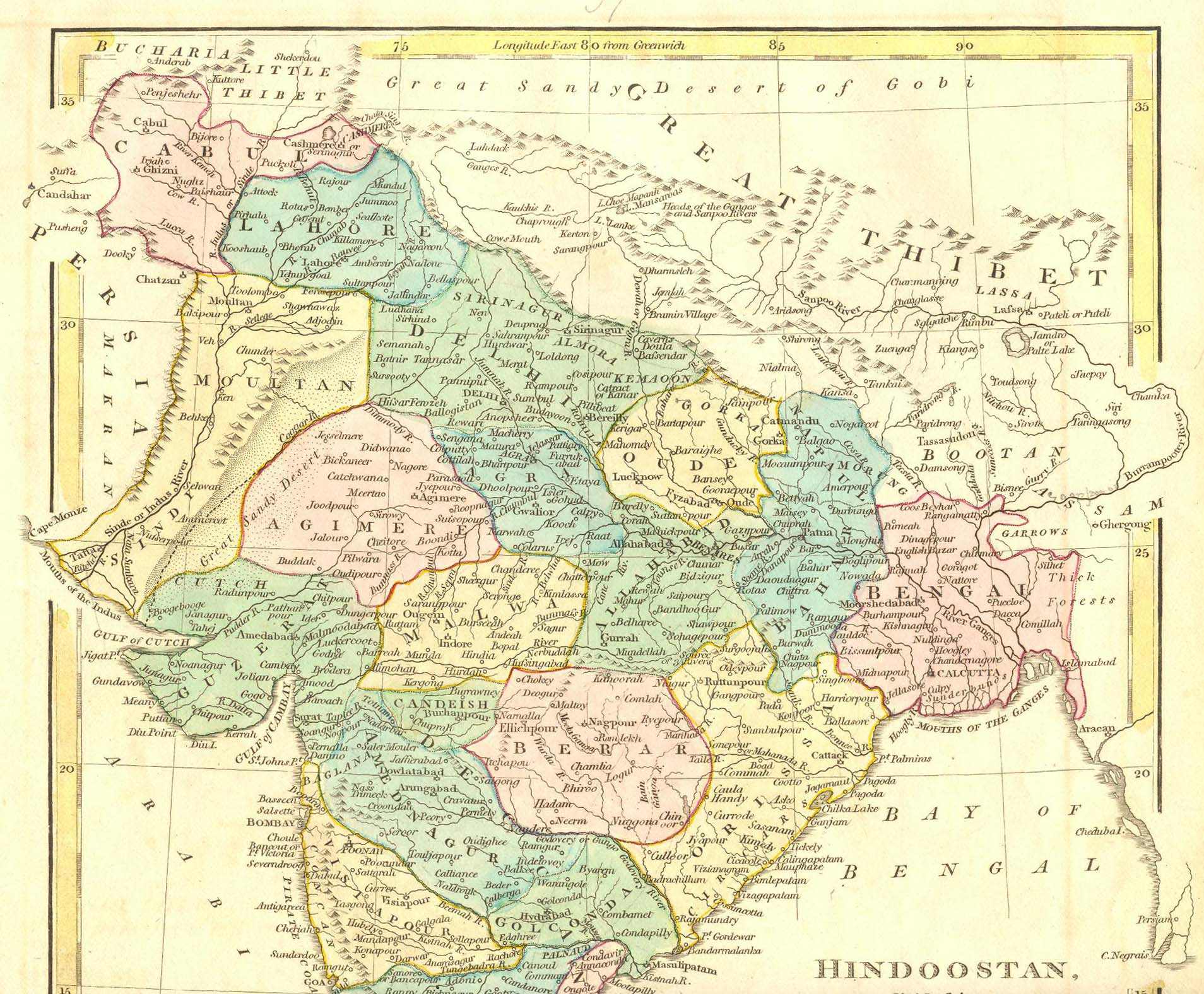
- The Suba of Bihar situated between Awadh and Bengal
- Capital: Patna
- Historical era: Early modern period
  - Established: 1575
  - Disestablished: 1733

Area
  - 1601: 55,478 sq mi (143,690 km^{2})
Preceded by	Succeeded by
Sur Empire	Bengal Subah
- Today part of: India

The Bihar Subah (Persian: صوبه بهار) was a province (suba) of the Mughal Empire that was formed in 1575. It was one of the original twelve subas established by Emperor Akbar. Its seat was in the city of Patna which was also known as Azimabad. The seat of Azimabad was named after the Mughal prince, Azim-ush-Shan who was the son of Emperor Shah Alam I.

The suba was bordered to the west by the subas of Illahabad and Awadh and to the east by Bengal Subah.

== History ==
The subah of Bihar functioned as a link between Hindustan and Bengal. On its northern boundary, it reached into the foothills of the Himalayas although this border was poorly defined as it was covered by the forested Terai. Under Emperor Akbar, Bihar was divided into seven sarkars which were:

- Bihar
- Monghyr
- Champaran
- Rohtas
- Hajipur
- Saran
- Tirhut

Much of the region was now fully integrated into the Empire, particularly around Monghhy and Khokhrah where it was said that "the laws and commands of the provincial administration could be ignored without incurring too many problems." The sarkar of Purnea was not fully integrated into the suba of Bihar but was under an independent faujdar known as the Faujdars of Purnea which acted as a small military frontier between Bihar and Bengal.

In 1733, Emperor Muhammad Shah granted the subah of Bihar to the subadar of Bengal, Shuja-ud-Din Muhammad Khan at which point Bihar and Bengal were merged with one another.

== Zamindars ==
Much of Bihar Suba during this time was under the control of semi-autonomous zamindars. Within Bihar, the Zamindars had both economic and military power. Each zamindari would have their own standing army which was typically composed of their own clansmen. Some notable zamindaris include:

- Hathwa Raj
- Tekari Raj
- Kharagpur Raj
- Bettiah Raj
- Khokhra Chieftaincy
- Jagdishpur estate
- Dumraon Raj
- Raj Darbhanga
- Cheros of Palamu
- Gidhaur Raj

== Subahdars ==
The Subahdars of Bihar during the Reign of Akbar and Jahangir include:

List of Mughal Subahdars of Bihar
No.	Governor	Tenure	Emperor	Historical Milestones & Notes
1	Mirza Aziz Koka	1580–1584	Akbar	First formal governor after Bihar was officially declared an independent Subah.
2	Said Khan	1584–1585	Akbar	
3	Said Khan & Mirza Yusuf Khan	1585–1586/87	Akbar	
4	Raja Man Singh I	1587–1594	Akbar	Established Rohtasgarh as the provincial capital.
5	Said Khan	1594–1598	Akbar	
6	Abul Qasim Namkin	1598–1599	Akbar	
7	Asaf Khan	1604–1605	Akbar	
8	Mirza Aziz Koka	1605	Akbar	Appointed briefly for a final second term.
9	Jahangir Quli Khan I	1605	Jahangir	Initial appointment upon Emperor Jahangir's accession.
10	Islam Khan I	1606–1607	Jahangir	
11	Afzal Khan	1607–11	Jahangir	Son of Abul Fazl.
12	Zafar Khan	1611–14	Jahangir	
13	Ibrahim Khan Fath-i-Jang	1614–15	Jahangir	Successfully captured the Nagbanshi king and secured the Sankh River diamond tracts.
14	Jahangir Quli Khan II	1616–17	Jahangir	
15	Muqarrab Khan	1617–19	Jahangir	
16	Parviz Mirza	1620–25	Jahangir	
17	Mirza Rustam Safavi	1625–27	Jahangir	
18	Khan-i Alam	1627	Shah Jahan	
19	Saif Khan	1627/28–32	Shah Jahan	
20	Abdullah Khan Bahadur Firuz-Jang	1632–39	Shah Jahan	
21	Shaista Khan	1639–43	Shah Jahan	Commanded major imperial military expeditions into the Chero strongholds of Palamau.
22	Itiqad Khan	1643–47	Shah Jahan	
23	Azam Khan	1647–48	Shah Jahan	
24	Saeed Khan Bahadur Zafar Jang	1648–51	Shah Jahan	
25	Allah Quli Khan	1651–52	Shah Jahan	
26	Jafar Khan	1652–56	Shah Jahan	
27	Zulfiqar Khan	1656–57	Shah Jahan	
28	Qasim Khan	1657	Shah Jahan	
29	Ikhlas Khan	1658	Shah Jahan	
30	Dara Shikoh	1658	Shah Jahan	Held the governorship nominally; active command managed by on-ground deputies Bahadur Khan and Baqi Beg.
31	Daud Khan Qureshi	1658–65	Aurangzeb	Finalized the submission of the Cheros and established Daudnagar.
32	Yadgar Beg (Lashkar Khan / Jan Nisar Khan)	1665–69	Aurangzeb	
33	Ibrahim Khan	1669–73	Aurangzeb	
34	Amir Khan (Mir Miran)	1673–76	Aurangzeb	
35	Tarbiyat Khan Barlas	1676–77	Aurangzeb	
36	Muhammad Azam Shah	1677–78	Aurangzeb	
37	Saif Khan (Saifuddin Muhammad)	1678–81	Aurangzeb	
38	Saifi Khan	1681–83	Aurangzeb	
39	Buzurg Umaid Khan	1683–93	Aurangzeb	
40	Mukhtar Khan	1693–95	Aurangzeb	
41	Fedai Khan	1695–1702	Aurangzeb	
42	Shamsher Khan Qureshi	1702–03	Aurangzeb	
43	Azim-ush-Shan	1703–07	Aurangzeb	Grandson of Aurangzeb; renamed Patna to Azimabad. Officiated on the ground by Deputy Sarbuland Khan.
