= Islam Khan I =

Mughal Subahdar of Bihar (1607–1608) and Bengal (1608–1613)

Islam Khan Chisti
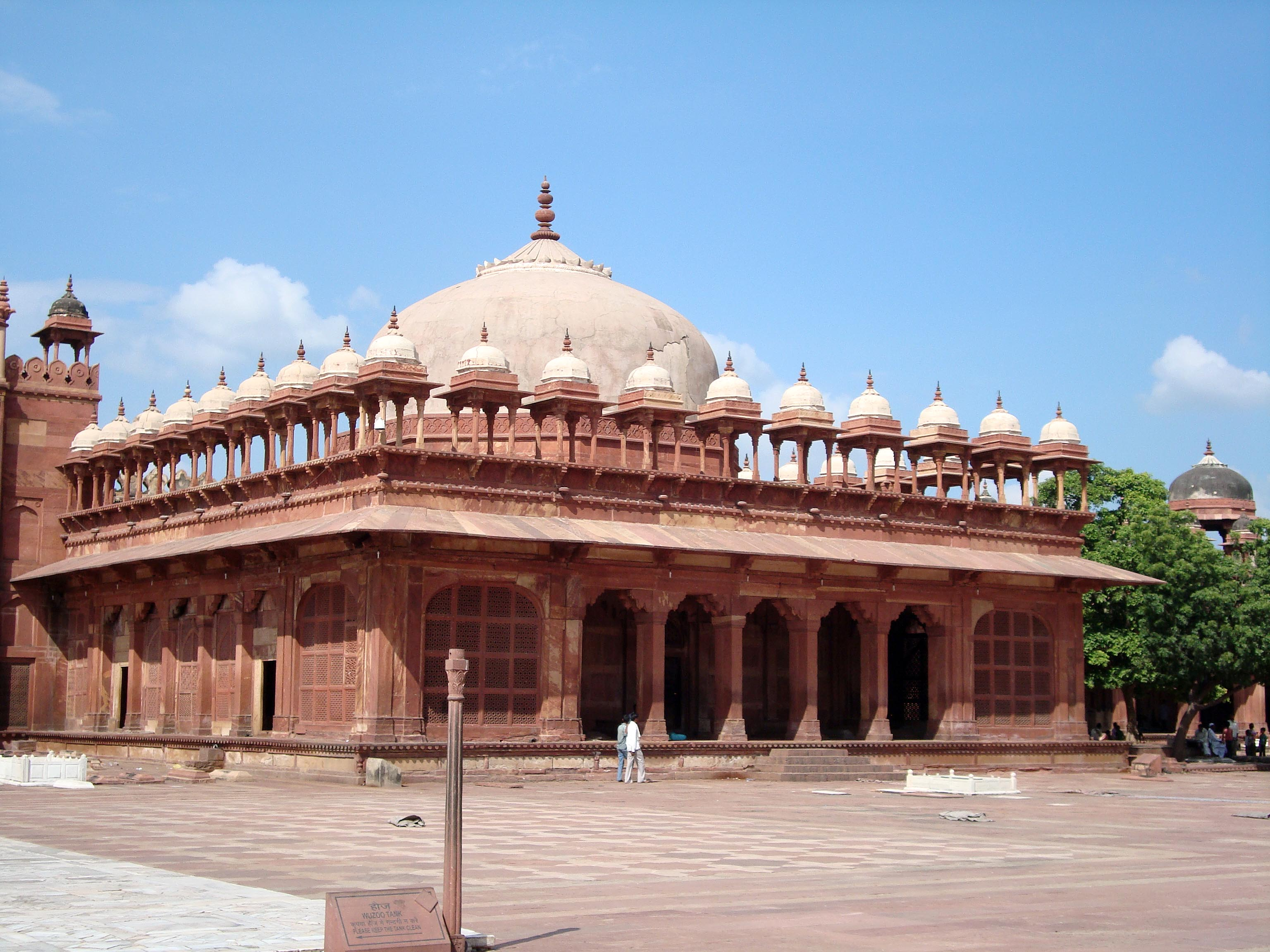
- The tomb of Islam Khan, in the courtyard of the Jama Masjid, Fatehpur Sikri

Subahdar of Bihar
- In office 1607–1608
- Monarch: Jahangir
- Succeeded by: Abdur Rahman

12th Subahdar of Bengal
- In office 10 June 1608 – 4 May 1613
- Monarch: Jahangir
- Preceded by: Jahangir Quli Khan
- Succeeded by: Muhtashim Khan

Personal details
- Born: Shaikh Alauddin Chisti c. 1570
- Died: 4 May 1613 Bhawal, Bengal, Mughal Empire
- Resting place: Jama Masjid, Uttar Pradesh, India
- Parent: Shaikh Badruddin Chisti
- Relatives: Shaikh Hushang alias Ikram Khan (son); Shaikh Muazzam (son); Salim Chishti (grandfather); Mukarram Khan (son-in-law); Qutubuddin Koka (cousin); Shaikh Ghiyasuddin (brother)
- Occupation: Subahdar, General

Shaikh Alauddin Chisti (c. 1570 – 4 May 1613), popularly known as Islam Khan Chisti, was a Mughal general and the Subahdar of Bihar from 1607 to 1608 and later Bengal from 1608 till his death in 1613. Under his viceroy Mughal rule was effectively consolidated in Bengal. He transferred the capital of Bengal from Rajmahal to Sonargaon and founded the city of Jahangirnagar. He was awarded the titular name of Islam Khan by Mughal emperor Jahangir.

== Early life ==
Islam Khan was a playmate of Jahangir in childhood. Khan and Jahangir were foster cousins; Khan's paternal aunt, whose father was Salim Chisti, had been the foster mother of Jahangir. Qutubuddin Koka was Khan's first cousin also. He was first appointed as the Subahdar of Bihar.

== Subahdar of Bengal ==
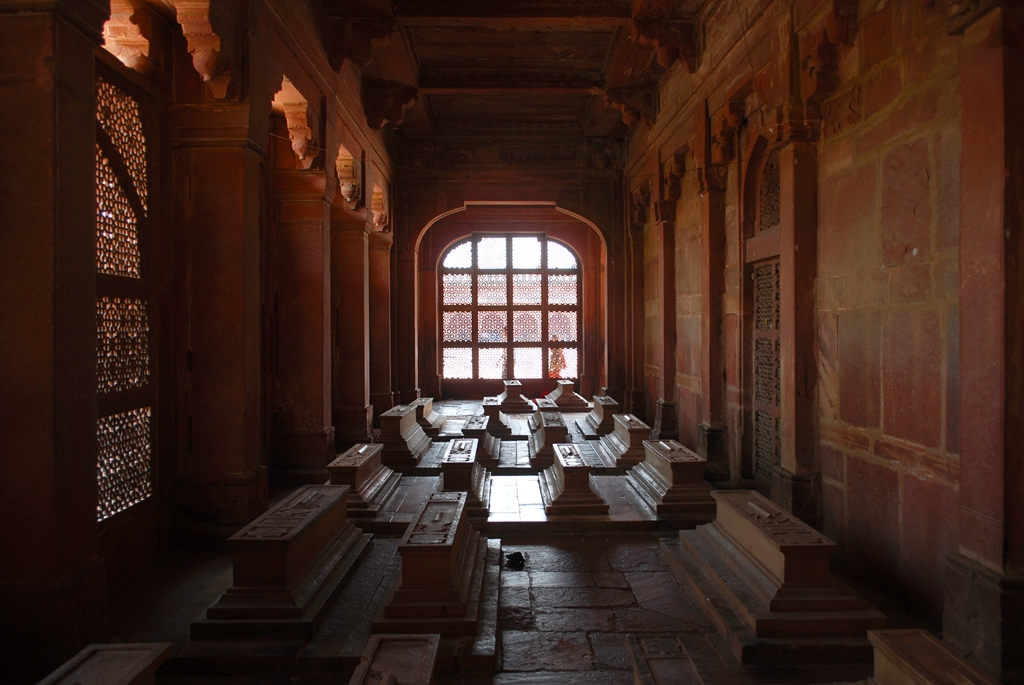
Islam Khan's tomb inside Salim Chisti Mazar

Islam Khan was appointed the Subahdar of Bengal in 1608. His major task was to subdue the rebellious Rajas, Bara-Bhuiyans, Zamindars and Afghan chiefs. He arrived in Dhaka in mid-1610.

He fought with Musa Khan, the leader of Bara-Bhuiyans and by the end of 1611 he was subdued. Islam Khan also defeated Raja Pratapaditya of Jessore, Raja Ramchandra Basu of the Chandradwip Kingdom during the Conquest of Bakla and Raja Ananta Manikya of Bhulua. Then he annexed the kingdoms of Koch Bihar, Koch Hajo and Kachhar. Thus he took total control over Bengal. He moved the capital of Bengal to Dhaka from Rajmahal. He also renamed Dhaka to Jahangirnagar.

Ma'asir ul umara states that he was a devout muslim, and fed 1000 poor everyday, and he supported 20000 persons related to his clan, the Shaikhzadas.

== Family ==
Islam Khan had married the sister of the famous Abul Fazl, and had one son with her, Shaikh Hushang, who was given the title of Ikram Khan by Jahangir. Hushang, who was made the governor of Asir, was an oppressor, and Shah Jahan repeatedly moved him from different positions on account of his ineffective rule. At the end of his life he became an ascetic. Hushang was a married to a daughter of Sher Khan Tonvar of Khandesh, and died in 1629. Islam Khan had another known son- Shaikh Muazzam, who had been made the Faujdar of Fatehpur by Jahangir. During Shah Jahan's succession struggle he supported Dara Shikoh, and died fighting Aurangzeb in the Battle of Samugarh. He also had a brother named Shaikh Ghiyasuddin.

== Death ==
After 5 years of ruling, Islam Khan died at Bhawal in 1613. He was buried in Fatehpur Sikri and laid by the side of his grandfather Shaikh Salim Chishti.

Shaikh Alauddin Chisti's tomb in Ajmer, known as the Dargah Sharif, has become a major pilgrimage site for people of all faiths.

== See also ==
- Dhaka
- History of Dhaka
- Mughal Empire
- History of Bengal

== Bibliography ==
- Sarkar, Jadunath, ed. (1943). The History of Bengal. Vol. II: Muslim Period. Delhi: B.R. Publishing Corporation. ISBN 81-7646-239-X.

Preceded by Jahangir Quli Beg	Subahdar of Bengal; 1608–1613	Succeeded by Qasim Khan Chishti
