= Gazipur-1 =

Constituency of Bangladesh's Jatiya Sangsad

Coordinates: 24.20°N 90.47°E

- Constituency for the Jatiya Sangsad
- District: Gazipur District
- Division: Dhaka Division
- Electorate: 720,939 (2026)

Current constituency
- Created: 1984
- Party: Bangladesh Nationalist Party
- Member: Mazibur Rahman
- ← 193 Dhaka-20 195 Gazipur-2 →

Gazipur-1 is a constituency represented in the Jatiya Sangsad (National Parliament) of Bangladesh since 2026 by Mazibur Rahman of the Bangladesh Nationalist Party.

== Boundaries ==
The constituency encompasses Kaliakair Upazila and wards 1–18 of Gazipur City Corporation.

== History ==
The constituency was created in 1984 when the former Dhaka District was split into six districts: Manikganj, Munshiganj, Dhaka, Gazipur, Narsingdi, and Narayanganj.

Ahead of the 2008 general election, the Election Commission redrew constituency boundaries to reflect population changes revealed by the 2001 Bangladesh census. The 2008 redistricting added a fifth seat to Gazipur District and altered the boundaries of Gazipur-1.

== Members of Parliament ==
| Election | Member | Party |
|---|---|---|
| 1986 | Motiur Rahman | Jatiya Party |
| 1991 | Rahamat Ali | Awami League |
| Feb 1996 | Chowdhury Tanbir Ahmed Siddiky | Bangladesh Nationalist Party |
| Jun 1996 | Rahamat Ali | Awami League |
| 2001 | Rahamat Ali | Awami League |
| 2008 | AKM Mozammel Haque | Awami League |
| 2014 | AKM Mozammel Haque | Awami League |
| 2018 | AKM Mozammel Haque | Awami League |
| 2024 | AKM Mozammel Haque | Awami League |
| 2026 | Mazibur Rahman | Bangladesh Nationalist Party |

== Election results ==
=== Elections in the 2020s ===
General election 2026: Gazipur-1
| Party | Candidate | Votes | % | ±% |
|---|---|---|---|---|
| BNP | Mazibur Rahman | 208,688 | | |
| Jamaat | Md. Shah Alam Bakshi | 149,553 | | |
| Independent | Md. Imarat Hossain Khan | | | |
| IAB | Ruhul Amin | | | |
| Majority | | 59,135 | | |
| Turnout | | | | |
| Registered electors | | 720,939 | | |
| BNP gain from AL | | | | |
