= AKM Fazlul Haque Milon =

Bangladeshi politician

- একেএম ফজলুল হক মিলন

Member of Parliament for Gazipur-3
- In office 28 October 2001 – 27 October 2006
- Preceded by: Akhtaruzzaman
- Succeeded by: Md. Rahamat Ali

Personal details
- Party: Bangladesh Nationalist Party

AKM Fazlul Haque Milon is a Bangladesh Nationalist Party politician and a former member of parliament for Gazipur-3.

== Career ==
Milon is a former president of the Jatiyatabadi Chhatra Dal.

Milon contested the June 1996 Bangladeshi general election from Gazipur-3 as a Bangladesh Nationalist Party candidate and lost. He received 30,834 votes while the winner, Akhtaruzzaman of the Awami League, received 35,502 votes.

Milon was elected to parliament from Gazipur-3 as a Bangladesh Nationalist Party candidate in 2001. He received 58,518 votes while his nearest rival, Akhtaruzzaman of the Awami League, received 58,133 votes. He was the only candidate from Bangladesh Nationalist Party to be elected from Gazipur District in the 8th parliamentary election. He was the general secretary of the Swechchhasebak Dal and the Gazipur District unit of Bangladesh Nationalist Party. He received a plot of land in Dhaka from the government along with 104 members of parliament from the Bangladesh Nationalist Party and Bangladesh Jamaat-e-Islami.

In September 2007, Milon was arrested from Gulshan by the Rapid Action Battalion (RAB). RAB Additional Director General Gulzar Uddin Ahmed reported that Milon was held under emergency power rules and was handed over to Ramna Police Station. He was charged with embezzling metal sheets meant for relief. His Mitsubishi Pajero was also seized by the RAB. He was sentenced to prison by Dhaka metropolitan magistrate ABM Abdul Fattah. The Anti Corruption Commission placed him on a list of 80 suspected corrupt politicians.

Milon was nominated to contest the 2008 Bangladeshi general election from Gazipur-5 as a Bangladesh Nationalist Party candidate. He lost the election with 74,899 votes while the winner, Meher Afroz of the Awami League, received 125,903 votes.

In March 2009, Milon received bail in a cases filed by the Anti Corruption Commission.

Milon campaigned for the Bangladesh Nationalist Party candidate for the 2011 Brahmanbaria-3 by election, Khaled Hossain Mahbub Shamol, against RAM Ubaidul Muktadir Chowdhury of the Awami League.

In May 2012, Milon and 32 other senior leaders of Bangladesh Nationalist Party were sent to jail in an arson case, regarding over a dozen vehicles burned during a strike by his party, after their bail petition was denied.

Milon did not participate in the 2014 Bangladeshi general election as the Bangladesh Nationalist Party boycotted it. Meher Afroz of the Awami League was elected uncontested from Gazipur-5. In December 2014, Bangladesh Chhattra League took over a venue of the Bangladesh Nationalist Party at Bhawal Badre Alam College in Gazipur where former prime minister Khaleda Zia was scheduled to speak. Milon vowed to hold the rally at the college despite it.

In 2018, Milon was nominated by Bangladesh Nationalist Party to contest the 2018 Bangladeshi general election from Gazipur-5. He was arrested in December 2018 from Gazipur, before the election, following arrest warrants issued from Dhaka. He was one of a number of Bangladesh Nationalist Party leaders held in jail before the election. He lost the election to Meher Afroz of the Awami League. He received 27,976 votes while Afroz received 207,699 votes.

Milon was arrested on 11 October 2022 after he and a fellow Bangladesh Nationalist Party leader blocked a road according to Bangladesh Police while the party claimed they were holding a peaceful rally.
