= Badruddin Ahmed Siddiky =

Bangladeshi Judge

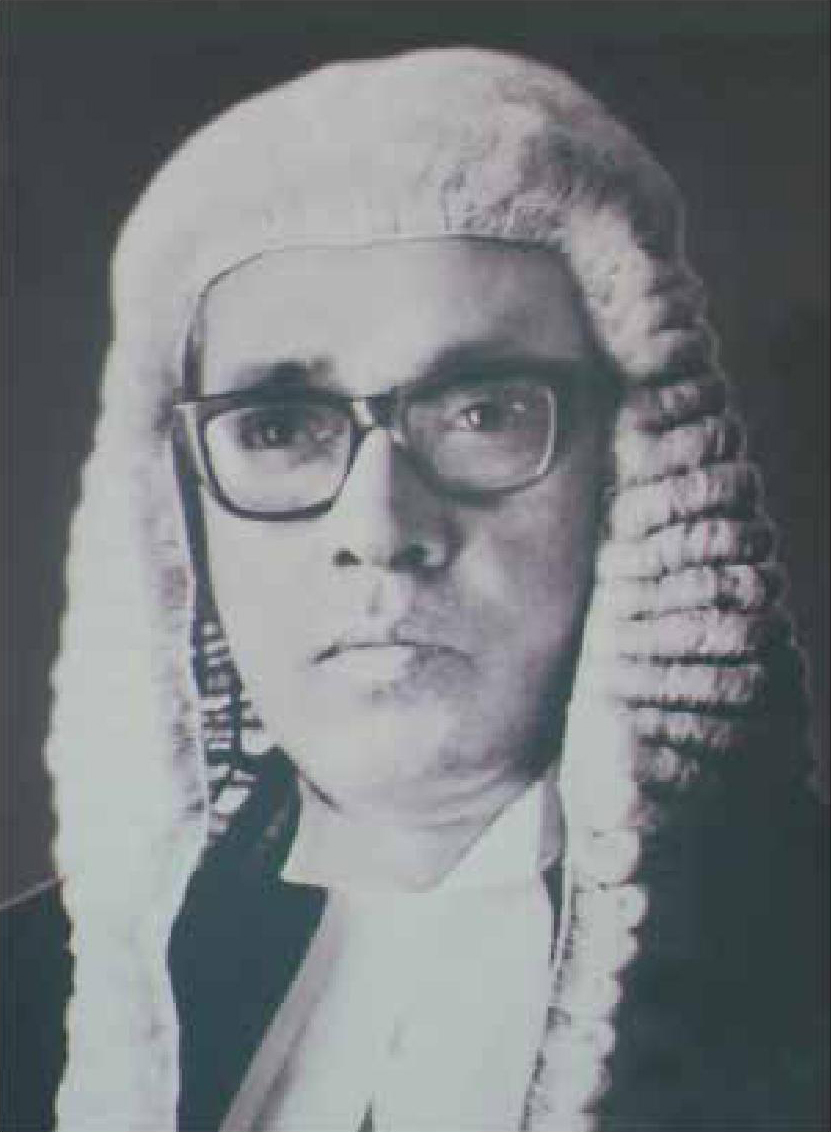

Chief Justice of East Pakistan

Personal details
- Born: 4 January 1915
- Died: 3 December 1991 (aged 76)
- Relatives: Chowdhury Kazemuddin Ahmed Siddiky (uncle); Shaffat Ahmed Siddiky (son); Chowdhury Tanbir Ahmed Siddiky (nephew)

Badruddin Ahmed Siddiky (1915–1991) was a Bangladeshi Jurist and the Chief Justice of East Pakistan.

== Early life ==
Siddiky was born on 4 January 1915 in Dhaka, East Bengal, British Raj. He was born in the Baliadi Zamindar family. He graduated from Dhaka College in 1932. When he was 20 he joined the All-India Muslim League. He graduated from Calcutta University and completed his law degree from Dhaka University in 1937.

== Career ==
He joined the Calcutta High Court in 1940 as an advocate. He moved to Dhaka after the Partition of India. He started working in the Dhaka High Court. He was the Legal Counsel to the State Bank of Pakistan from 1952 to 1957. He became the attorney general of East Pakistan in 1957. He became a judge in the Dhaka High Court in 1960. In 1962 he became the chairman of East Pakistan Red Cross. He was elected to the World Judges Conference executive committee in 1967. He became the Chief Justice of East Pakistan High Court. He helped collect aid for the aftermath of 1970 Bhola cyclone.

During the Bangladesh Liberation War, he refused to administer the oath of governor of East Pakistan to General Tikka Khan. His house was surrounded by soldiers of Pakistan army to compel his to administer the oath but he refused. He coordinated relief efforts of the Red Cross during the war. After the Independence of Bangladesh, he became the chairman of Bangladesh Red Cross in 1975 following the assassination of Sheikh Mujibur Rahman. In 1986 he was appointed adviser to the President of Bangladesh, Hussain Muhammad Ershad, with the rank equal to that of a minister. He was the permanent representative of Bangladesh to the United Nation from 1986 to 1988. He took his retirement in 1988.

== Death ==
Siddiky died on 3 December 1991.
