= Mazibur Rahman (Bangladeshi politician) =

Bangladeshi politician

- মজিবুর রহমান
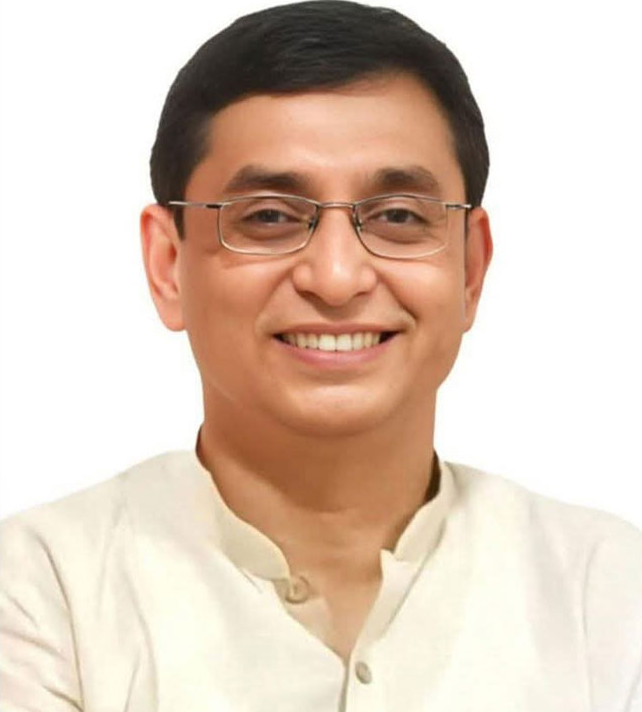
- Photo of Md. Mazibur Rahman

Member of Parliament
- Incumbent
- Assumed office 12 February 2026
- Preceded by: AKM Mozammel Haque
- Constituency: Gazipur-1

Personal details
- Born: Gazipur
- Party: Bangladesh Nationalist Party
- Occupation: Politician

Mazibur Rahman (Bengali: মজিবুর রহমান is a Bangladeshi politician and the member of parliament for Gazipur-1 (Kaliakair, Kashimpur, Konabari, Basan Thana) constituency. He is a member of the Central National Executive Committee of the Bangladesh Nationalist Party. He is popularly known as Mayor Mazibur Rahman. Before entering parliamentary politics, he was appointed as the Administrator of Kaliakair Municipality in 2004 and was subsequently elected Mayor several times. He served as the Mayor of Kaliakoir Municipality for almost two decades (20 years).

== Early life and education ==
Mayor Mazibur Rahman was born in a Muslim family in Kaliakair Upazila of Gazipur district.

== Early political career ==
Rahman became the administrator of Kaliakair Municipality in 2004. Later, he was elected as the mayor of Kaliakair Municipality three times in a row. He is a member of the BNP Central National Executive Committee.

He was elected as a member of parliament for the first time from the Gazipur-1 constituency on the nomination of the Bangladesh Nationalist Party in the 13th National Parliament election held on February 12, 2026.
