= Gazipur-5 =

Constituency of Bangladesh's Jatiya Sangsad

Coordinates: 23.92°N 90.57°E

- Constituency for the Jatiya Sangsad
- District: Gazipur District
- Division: Dhaka Division
- Electorate: 354,643 (2026)

Current constituency
- Created: 2008
- Party: Bangladesh Nationalist Party
- Member: AKM Fazlul Haque Milon
- ← 197 Gazipur-4 199 Narsingdi-1 →

Gazipur-5 is a constituency represented in the Jatiya Sangsad (National Parliament) of Bangladesh since 2026 by AKM Fazlul Haque Milon of the Bangladesh Nationalist Party.

== Boundaries ==
The constituency encompasses Kaliganj Upazila, Gazipur City Corporation wards 40 through 42, and one union parishad of Gazipur Sadar Upazila: Baria.

== History ==
The constituency was created when, ahead of the 2008 general election, the Election Commission redrew constituency boundaries to reflect population changes revealed by the 2001 Bangladesh census. The 2008 redistricting added a new seat to Gazipur District, increasing the number of constituencies in the district from four to five.

== Members of Parliament ==
Election	Member	Party
2008	Meher Afroz Chumki	Awami League
2014	Meher Afroz Chumki	Awami League
2018	Meher Afroz Chumki	Awami League
2024	Akhtaruzzaman	Independent
2026	AKM Fazlul Haque Milon	Bangladesh Nationalist Party

== Elections ==
=== Elections in the 2020s ===
General election 2026: Gazipur-5
Party	Candidate	Votes	%	±%
BNP	A. K. M. Fazlul Haque Milon	133,869		
Jamaat	Md. Khairul Hasan	78,123		
Janotar Dal	Md. Azam Khan			
IAB	Gazi Ataur Rahman			
Majority		55,746		
Turnout				
Registered electors		354,643		
BNP gain from Independent				

=== Elections in the 2010s ===
Meher Afroz Chumki was re-elected unopposed in the 2014 general election after opposition parties withdrew their candidacies in a boycott of the election.

=== Elections in the 2000s ===
General Election 2008: Gazipur-5
Party	Candidate	Votes	%	±%
AL	Meher Afroz Chumki	125,903	61.5	N/A
BNP	AKM Fazlul Haque Milon	74,899	36.6	N/A
Zaker Party	ANM Moniruzzaman	1,713	0.8	N/A
Independent	Md. Monir Hossain	1,229	0.6	N/A
Independent	Richard R. Fraser	464	0.2	N/A
KSJL	Md. Atiqur Rahman Bhuiyan	137	0.1	N/A
BJP	Sarwar Khan	105	0.1	N/A
Ganatantri Party	Aziz Ul Haque Kanchon	104	0.1	N/A
Gano Forum	Amin Ahmad Afsary	92	0.0	N/A
Majority		51,004	24.9	N/A
Turnout		204,646	89.1	N/A
AL win (new seat)				
