= Asfar Hossain Mollah =

Bangladeshi politician (1953–2016)

Member of Parliament for Gazipur-3
- In office 5 March 1991 – 24 November 1995
- Preceded by: Mohammad Mokhlesur Rahman
- Succeeded by: AKM Fazlul Haque Milon

Personal details
- Born: c. 1953
- Died: 13 May 2016 (aged 63)
- Party: Bangladesh Awami League
- Education: Dhaka Medical College
- Occupation: Physician, Politician

Asfar Hossain Mollah (c. 1953 – 13 May 2016) was a Bangladeshi physician and politician from Gazipur belonging to Bangladesh Awami League. He was a member of the Jatiya Sangsad and the Bangladesh Medical Association.

== Biography ==
Mollah was the son of Hafiz Uddin Mollah and Begum Shahida Mollah. The vice president of Dhaka Medical College Central Students' Union and presidium member of Jubo League, he was an active member of society. Other associations he was also a member of include Bangladesh Medical Association. He was elected as a member of the Jatiya Sangsad from Gazipur-3 in 1991.

Mollah died on 13 May 2016 in Bangabandhu Sheikh Mujib Medical University Hospital at the age of 63.
