= Nagari Church =

- St. Nicholas of Tolentino Church
- নাগরী গির্জা; সাধু নিকোলাস তোলেন্তিনো গির্জা
- Nagari Church
- 23.9145173°N 90.5079896°E
- Location: Nagari, Gazipur District
- Country: Bangladesh
- Denomination: Catholic
- Website: dhakaarchdiocese.com/nagari-parish/

History
- Status: Church

Architecture
- Functional status: Active
- Architectural type: Indo-European
- Years built: 1664

Administration
- Diocese: Dhaka
- Parish: Nagari

Clergy
- Priest: Khokon V. Gomes

Nagari Church, officially St. Nicholas of Tolentino Church, is an ancient and active roman catholic parish church located in Nagari, Kaliganj Upazila, Gazipur District, Bangladesh.

== History ==
During the Middle Ages, the Portuguese arrived in the Mughal Empire for trade. After arrival, they began preaching Christianity. In the late sixteenth century, after the Portuguese established a settlement in Nagari of the Bhawal region in the empire's Bengal Subah, they established the church in 1664 with the permission of Jahangir, the Mughal Emperor, as a temporary structure. In 1680, its permanent building was constructed. The church building was rebuilt in 1888. It is believed that the previous church structure had been destroyed in a fire.

== Layout ==
Besides the church, there are two cemeteries here. In 1910, St. Nicholas Primary School was established here, which was later transformed into a lower secondary English school. The Church's new building was constructed there in 2009.

== Architecture ==
The single-storey church was built in a combination of European and native architectural styles. It is divided into a veranda, a congregational prayer hall, an altar, and a private prayer room. To enter the church, visitors must use one of the three entrances located on the veranda. Twelve iron pillars were used as the foundation for the construction of the church. Portuguese-style architecture is prominent in this church, examples of which can also be seen in Sri Lanka and the Indian state of Goa.

== Legacy ==
It is one of the oldest churches in the Indian subcontinent. While serving at this church and residing in its parish, missionary Manuel da Assumpção wrote the first grammar and dictionary of the Bengali language. In addition, a Bible written in the Kaliganj dialect was published from here.
