= Chowdhury Kazemuddin Ahmed Siddiky =

Indian social worker (1876–1937)

Personal details
- Born: 1876 Kaliakair Upazila, Gazipur District, British Raj
- Died: 1937 (aged 60–61) Kaliakair Upazila, Gazipur District, British Raj
- Party: All-India Muslim League
- Relatives: Badruddin Ahmed Siddiky (nephew); Chowdhury Tanbir Ahmed Siddiky (grandson)
- Occupation: Zamindar; politician; social worker

Chowdhury Kazemuddin Ahmed Siddiky (1876–1937) was a Bengali Muslim aristocrat and politician during the British Raj. A Khan Bahadur, he was one of the founders of the University of Dacca. He was President of the Eastern Bengal and Assam Muslim League between 1908 and 1912. He was also a member of the governing council of Jagannath College.

Siddiky was fluent in Bengali, English, Urdu, Arabic and Persian.

== Social work ==
Siddiky was an influential social worker in East Bengal, supporting the development of roads, hospitals, dispensaries, water supply, irrigation and orphanages. Because of his social work, the British gifted him with the title 'Khan Bahadur'.

== Family ==
Siddiky was born in 1876 into the landlord family of Baliadi hamlet in Gazipur, central Bengal. He was a descendant of Qutubuddin Koka, one of the early Mughal Viceroys of Bengal. His brother's son Justice Badruddin Ahmed Siddiky was the Chief Justice of the High Court of Dacca and Bangladesh's Permanent Representative to the United Nations in New York. His grandson Chowdhury Tanbir Ahmed Siddiky was a leader of the Bangladesh Nationalist Party (BNP) and a former cabinet minister in Bangladesh.
