= Motiur Rahman (Gazipur politician) =

Bangladeshi politician (c. 1926–2014)

Matiur Rahman

Member of Bangladesh Parliament

Personal details
- Born: c. 1926
- Died: 7 August 2014
- Party: Jatiya Party (Ershad)

Matiur Rahman (c. 1926 – 7 August 2014) is a Jatiya Party (Ershad) politician and a former member of parliament of Gazipur-1.

== Career ==
Rahman was elected to parliament from Gazipur-1 as a Jatiya Party candidate in 1986 and 1988.

== Death ==
Matiur Rahman died on 7 August 2014.
