= Chowdhury Tanbir Ahmed Siddiky =

Bangladeshi politician (born 1939)

- চৌধুরী তানবীর আহমেদ সিদ্দিকী

Member of the Bangladesh Parliament for Gazipur-1
- In office 19 March 1996 – 30 March 1996
- Preceded by: Rahamat Ali
- Succeeded by: Rahamat Ali

Personal details
- Born: 14 February 1939 (age 87)
- Party: Bangladesh Nationalist Party
- Children: Chowdhury Irad Ahmed Siddiky Chowdhury Ishrak Ahmed Siddiky
- Parent: Khan Bahadur Chowdhury Labibuddin Ahmed Siddiky (father)
- Relatives: Grandfather: Khan Bahadur Chowdhury Kazemuddin Ahmed Siddiky, Grandchildren: Aymann Siddiky, Aaron Siddiky

Chowdhury Tanbir Ahmed Siddiky (born 14 February 1939) is a Bangladeshi politician. He is one of the founding members of the Bangladesh Nationalist Party (BNP). He served as the State Minister for Commerce in the cabinet of President Ziaur Rahman and President Abdus Sattar. He served as the senior-most member of the Bangladesh Nationalist Party's (BNP) highest decision making body, the National Standing Committee, until he was expelled from the party in March 2009, which was withdrawn in November 2018 and he was reinstated in his previous party position. He had previously served as the president of FBCCI, the body that regulates businessmen in Bangladesh, in 1979 and DCCI in 1976–1978.

== Early life ==
Siddiky was born in 1939. He is the grandson of Khan Bahadur Chowdhury Kazemuddin Ahmed Siddiky, the co-founder of the Assam-Bengal Muslim League during the British rule and one of the founders of the University of Dhaka.

== Career ==
Siddiky is the founder treasurer of the BNP and was a member of the National Standing Committee since its inception. He was a member of the second parliament and served as the Commerce minister in 1979–81. Siddiky was the president of FBCCI in 1979 and DCCI in '76–'78 and worked as director of former National Bank of Pakistan and Janata Bank. During the term of Hussain Muhammad Ershad, Siddiky was convicted of corruption by the martial law court and served 3 years of a 14-year sentence before being released during the Anti-Ershad Movement.

In March 2009, Siddiky was expelled from the BNP for violating party discipline. Siddiky had been present at a press conference where his son made allegations against the BNP Chairperson Khaleda Zia and other politicians. His son Chowdhury Irad Ahmed Siddiky was a candidate for the Mayor of Dhaka North in 2015 and a candidate for the Member of Parliament of Gazipur-1 in 2023-24. Siddiky did not speak out against his son's actions until the next day. Tanbir Siddiky has stated that the expulsion was contrary to the party's constitution. He was reinstated in his previous party position in November 2018 and participated in the 2018 National Elections as the Bangladesh Nationalist Party's candidate from Gazipur-1.
