= Chowdhury Irad Ahmed Siddiky =

Writer and researcher active in electoral politics

- চৌধুরী ইরাদ আহমেদ সিদ্দিকী
- Siddiky in 2015
- Occupations: Writer, researcher and politician
- Father: Chowdhury Tanbir Ahmed Siddiky

Chowdhury Irad Ahmed Siddiky is a Bangladeshi writer, researcher and politician. He has contested elections as an independent candidate and as a candidate of political parties.

Siddiky is the author of the 2003 book The Compromised Republic: An Inquiry into the Development of Underdevelopment, which concerns development economics and regional economic disparities in Bangladesh. He has also written a paper on Mahatma Gandhi's use of nonviolent resistance and the Indian independence movement.

Siddiky contested the 2015 Dhaka North City Corporation mayoral election and the Gazipur-1 constituency in the 2024 and 2026 parliamentary elections.

== Education ==
Siddiky attended St. Paul's School, Darjeeling. He received a Bachelor of Arts degree in history from Stony Brook University in 1997.

== Writing and research ==
Siddiky's book The Compromised Republic: An Inquiry into the Development of Underdevelopment was published in 2003. He also wrote "Mahatma Gandhi and the Prisoner's Dilemma: Strategic Civil Disobedience and Great Britain's Great Loss of Empire in India", a paper concerning Gandhi's civil disobedience and the Indian independence movement.

In 2008, he wrote "Recrossing the Stream" for Forum, a monthly magazine published by The Daily Star. The essay discussed dynastic politics in Bangladesh's major political parties.

== Political activity ==
In March 2009, ahead of the Dhaka City Corporation mayoral election, Siddiky alleged that BNP chairperson Khaleda Zia had sought Tk 5 crore in connection with party backing. The BNP rejected the allegation as baseless. At the same press conference, Siddiky said he would not be "servile to any dynasty", described himself as a BNP-minded independent candidate and presented a 76-point manifesto for Dhaka.

Siddiky contested the 2015 Dhaka North City Corporation mayoral election. In the 2024 parliamentary election, he contested Gazipur-1 as a candidate of Trinamool BNP.

In November 2025, Siddiky held a press conference in Gazipur in which he criticised the role of money in party nomination processes and said that politics had moved away from political ideals. He said he intended to contest the next parliamentary election as an independent candidate.

In the 2026 parliamentary election, Siddiky contested Gazipur-1 as a Bangladesh Labour Party candidate.

== Public-interest litigation ==
On 24 May 2009, a High Court bench comprising Justice Syed Refaat Ahmed and Justice Moinul Islam Chowdhury issued a rule following a writ petition filed by Siddiky concerning the Dhaka City Corporation mayoral election. The court asked the government and the Chief Election Commissioner to explain why the continued service of the existing mayor and commissioners should not be declared unlawful and why an immediate mayoral election should not be ordered.

== Legal proceedings ==
On 23 February 2017, the Counter Terrorism Unit of the Dhaka Metropolitan Police arrested Siddiky at Hazrat Shahjalal International Airport. BBC Bangla reported that the arrest was connected with a case filed the previous year at Kotwali police station under Section 57 of the Information and Communication Technology Act. The report also said that five cases had been filed against him at the time.

Freedom House reported that Siddiky had arrived in Bangladesh from the Netherlands and included his arrest in its 2017 report on internet freedom. Human Rights Watch later included the arrest in an annex concerning cases involving political criticism on social media.

In November 2024, the High Court quashed proceedings in a 2016 case filed under Section 57 of the Information and Communication Technology Act. Siddiky, Khaleda Zia and Tarique Rahman were among those accused in the case. The Daily Star reported that the ruling followed a petition filed by Siddiky in 2017.
