= Meher Afroz Chumki =

Bangladeshi politician (born 1959)

Meher Afroze Chumki
- মেহের আফরোজ চুমকি
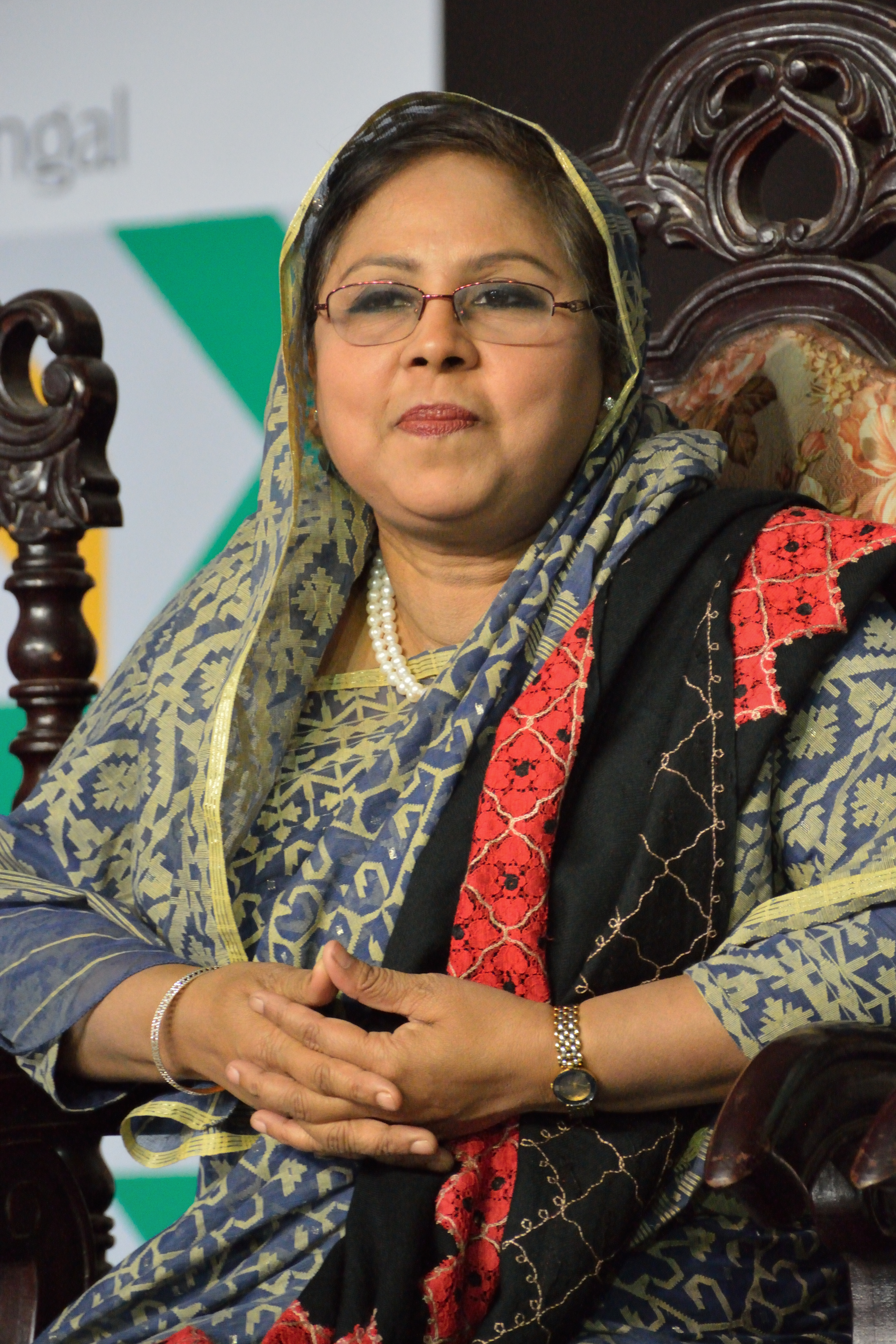
- Chumki in 2016

Member of the Bangladesh Parliament for Reserved women's seat–33
- In office 28 February 2024 – 6 August 2024
- Preceded by: Parveen Haque Sikder

Member of the Bangladesh Parliament for Gazipur-5
- In office 25 January 2009 – 29 January 2024
- Preceded by: Position established
- Succeeded by: Akhtaruzzaman

Minister of State for Women and Children Affairs
- In office 2 June 2013 – 3 January 2019
- Preceded by: Shirin Sharmin Chaudhury
- Succeeded by: Fazilatun Nessa Indira

Member of the Bangladesh Parliament for Reserved women's seat–20
- In office 14 July 1996 – 13 July 2001
- Preceded by: K. J. Hamida Khanam
- Succeeded by: Raihan Akhter Banu Roni

Personal details
- Born: 1 November 1959 (age 66) Gazipur, East Pakistan, Pakistan
- Party: Bangladesh Awami League
- Spouse: Mohammad Masudur Rahman
- Parent: Moyez Uddin (father)
- Education: University of Dhaka
- Awards: Anannya Top Ten Awards (2014)

Meher Afroze Chumki (born 1 November 1959) is a Bangladeshi politician. She was the State Minister for Women and Children Affairs. She is the incumbent president of Bangladesh Mohila Awami League at the Sixth National Council held in December 2022.

== Early life and education ==
Chumki was born on 1 November 1959 to Moyez Uddin. Her father, Moyez Uddin, was a member of parliament who was assassinated in 1984. She completed her bachelor's degree in botany from the University of Dhaka.

== Career ==
Between 1996 and 2001, Chumki served in Parliament in the reserved seats for women. She represented the Gazipur-5 constituency. In 2009, she was elected to parliament and in 2013, was sworn in as State Minister for Women and Children Affairs.

After the fall of the Sheikh Hasina-led Awami League government, Judge Md Zakir Hossain Galib ordered the freezing of Chumki's bank accounts and confiscated her apartment.

== Personal life ==
Chumki is married to the CEO of Bangladesh Petroleum and Lubricants Muhammad Masudur Rahman.

== Awards ==
- Anannya Top Ten Awards (2014)
