= M. Zahid Hasan =

Bangladeshi physicist (born 1971)

- Born: 1971 (age 54–55); Dhaka, Bangladesh
- Known for: Dirac matter
- Awards: Mustafa Prize (2021); Ernest Orlando Lawrence Award (2020)
- Scientific career
- Fields: Quantum physics, topology
- Workplaces: Princeton University
- Thesis: Charge Dynamics in Low Dimensional Prototype Correlated Systems (2001)
- Doctoral advisor: Zhi-Xun Shen

Mohammad Zahid Hasan (born 1971) is a Bangladeshi physicist and Eugene Higgins Professor of Physics at Princeton University. Hasan's research interests include quantum physics and quantum topology. He is a member of the American Academy of Arts and Sciences and a fellow of the Bangladesh Academy of Sciences.

== Personal life and career ==
Born in Dhaka, Bangladesh, in 1971, Hasan attended Dhanmondi Government Boys' High School, and later graduated from Dhaka College in 1988. He was admitted to the physics department of Dhaka University, but chose to attend the University of Texas at Austin on a scholarship. Hasan completed his B.S. degree in physics, and then attended Stanford University, from which he obtained an M.S. and a Ph.D.

Hasan's Ph.D. thesis, entitled Charge Dynamics in Low Dimensional Prototype Correlated Systems, was published by the Stanford Linear Accelerator Center in November 2001 and by the Office of Scientific and Technical Information in March 2002. Advised by Zhi-Xun Shen, the report served as Hasan's thesis in applied physics.

After his graduate work at the Stanford Linear Accelerator Center and Brookhaven National Laboratory, Hasan became a Robert H. Dicke Fellow in fundamental physics at Princeton University and held appointments at Bell Laboratories and Lawrence Berkeley National Laboratory, before joining the faculty at Princeton University.

Hasan is the Principal Investigator of Laboratory for Topological Quantum Matter and Advanced Spectroscopy at Princeton University and a Visiting Faculty Scientist at Lawrence Berkeley National Laboratory in California Since 2014 he has been an EPiQS-Moore Investigator, awarded by the Betty and Gordon Moore foundation in Palo Alto (California) for his research on emergent quantum phenomena in topological matter. He has been a Vanguard Fellow of the Aspen Institute (Washington DC) since 2014. Hasan is an elected fellow of the American Academy of Arts and Sciences. In 2024, Hasan was appointed a visiting professor to the Massachusetts Institute of Technology.

== Research ==
Hasan's research is focused on fundamental physics - either searching for, or in-depth exploration of novel phases of electronic quantum matter. He co-proposed and co-led the scattering-spectroscopy MERLIN beam-line and end-station facility at the Lawrence Berkeley National Laboratory. and developed a laboratory for ultrafast and coherent quantum phenomena at Princeton University.
