= Kaliganj Upazila, Gazipur =

Kaliganj কালীগঞ্জ
- Upazila
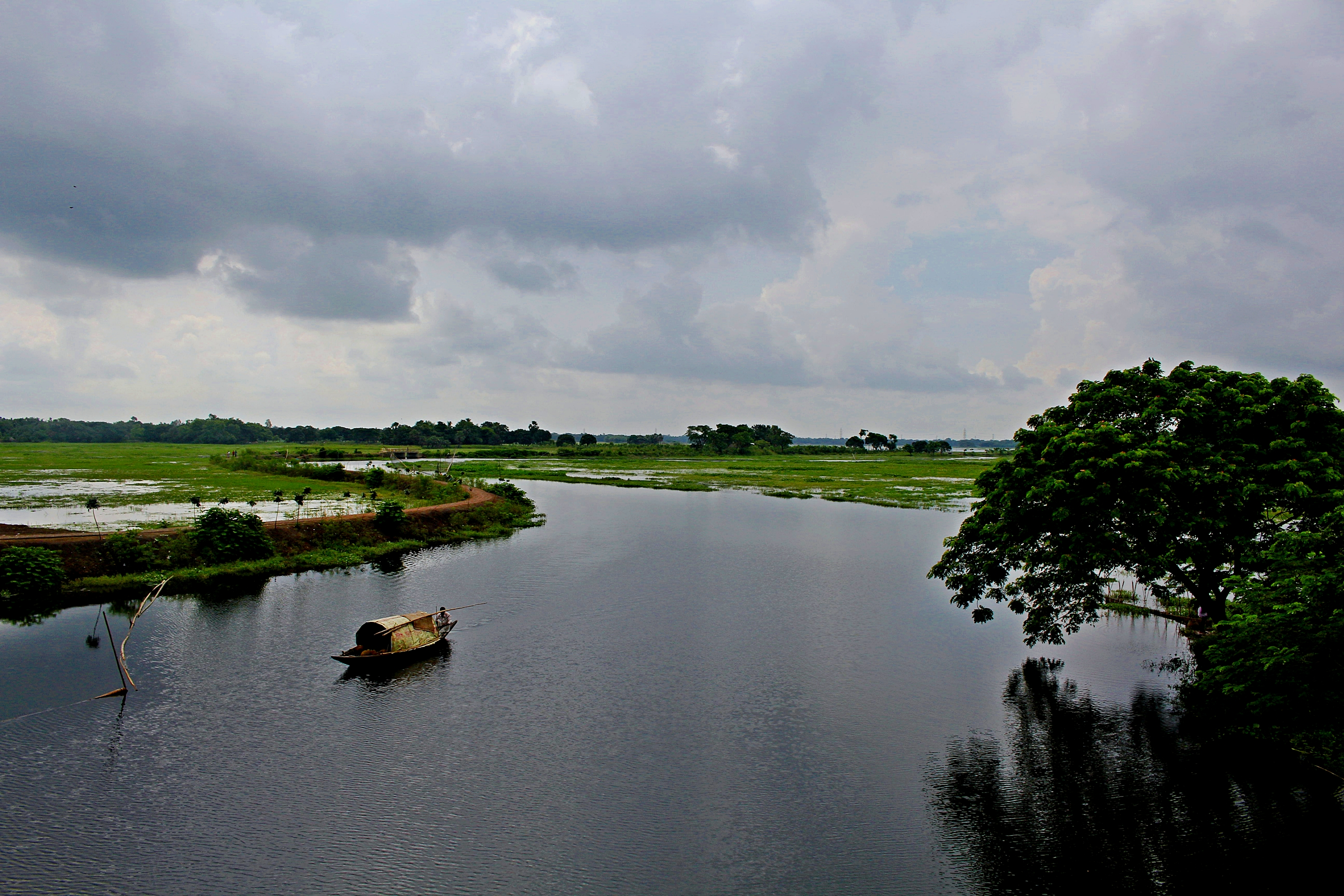
- Belai Beel

- Coordinates: 23°55′30″N 90°34′00″E
- Country: Bangladesh
- Division: Dhaka
- District: Gazipur

Area
  - Total: 214.63 km^{2} (82.87 sq mi)

Population (2022)
  - Total: 310,956
  - Density: 1,448.8/km^{2} (3,752.4/sq mi)
- Time zone: UTC+6 (BST)
- Postal code: 1720
- Area code: 06823
- Website: kaliganj.gazipur.gov.bd

Kaliganj (Bengali: কালীগঞ্জ) is an upazila (sub-district) of Gazipur District in central Bangladesh, part of the Dhaka Division.

== Geography ==
Kaliganj is located at 23.9250°N 90.5667°E. It has a total area of 214.63 km^{2}.

== Demographics ==
Religions in Kaliganj Upazila (2022)
Religion	Percent
Islam	84.08%
Hinduism	10.44%
Christianity	5.41%
Other or not stated	0.07%

According to the 2022 Bangladeshi census, Kaliganj Upazila had 76,728 households and a population of 310,956. 8.75% of the population were under 5 years of age. Kaliganj had a literacy rate (age 7 and over) of 79.58%: 80.82% for males and 78.37% for females, and a sex ratio of 98.86 males for every 100 females. 71,804 (23.09%) lived in urban areas.

According to the 2011 Census of Bangladesh, Kaliganj Upazila had 57,770 households and a population of 265,276. 55,425 (20.89%) were under 10 years of age. Kaliganj had a literacy rate (age 7 and over) of 59.81%, compared to the national average of 51.8%, and a sex ratio of 991 females per 1000 males. 45,430 (17.13%) lived in urban areas.

Kaliganj is the most religiously diverse upazila in Gazipur district. The Christian community consists of Bhawal Catholics converted by the Portuguese in the 17th century.

As of the 1991 Bangladesh census, Kaliganj has a population of 175915. Males constitute 93.86% of the population, and females 87.14%. This Upazila's eighteen up population is 87404. Kaliganj has an average literacy rate of 90.6% (7+ years), and the national average of 90.4% literate. Main occupations Agriculture 47.35%, dairy and fishery 1.89%, agricultural labourer 11.32%, wage labourer 2.11%, weaving 1.71%, commerce 9.22%, transport 1.79%, service 15.84%, others 8.77%.

== Administration ==
Kaliganj Upazila is divided into Kaliganj Municipality and seven union parishads: Baktarpur, Bhadursadi, Jamalpur, Jangalia, Moktarpur, Nagari, and Tumulia. The union parishads are subdivided into 151 mauzas and 175 villages.

Kaliganj Municipality is subdivided into 9 wards and 23 mahallas.

== Education ==
According to Banglapedia, Saint Nicholas High School is a notable secondary school.

Literacy rate: Average 90.9%; male 91.9%, female 87.8%.

Water Bodies: Shitalkshya River, Balu River, Punshahi Belai Beel, Suti Canal, Stuart-Barnared Canal, Patha Mara Canal.

Archaeological heritage and relics: Tomb of Isa Khan, the ruler of Bhati at Baktarpur, St. Nicholas Church (1695), Mazars and Dighi of Pahlwan Shah Gazi and Karforma Shah at Chaura, Tomb of Shah Bayejid and eight domed Mosque at Vatgati, Kachari Punshahi.

Religious institutions: Mosque 395, temple 19, church 6.

Important Business places: (Hat/Bazar): Kaliganj, Jamalpur, Pubail, Ulokhola, Saoraid bazar, Dolan Bazar, Aowrakhali, Punshahi Bazar. Noapara bazar.

Kaliganj also has the following educational institutions:

- Kaliganj RNN Pilot Government High School, Kaliganj, Gazipur
- Baligaon High School, kaliganj, Gazipur
- Kaliganj Girls High School, Kaliganj, Gazipur

== Notable residents ==
- Meher Afroz Chumki, state minister for women and children affairs (2013–2019), was member of parliament for constituency Gazipur-5 from 2009 until 2024.
- Humayun Faridi, actor, attended primary school in Kaliganj village.
- Farooque
- Rumana Khan
- Abdullah Al Mamun
- Gazi Golam Mostafa
- Abujafar Shamsuddin
- Enayetur Rahman, former Bangladesh national football team player.

== Tourist attractions ==
- Nagari Church

== See also ==
- Upazilas of Bangladesh
- Districts of Bangladesh
- Divisions of Bangladesh
