= Sreepur Upazila, Gazipur =

Sreepur শ্রীপুর
- Upazila
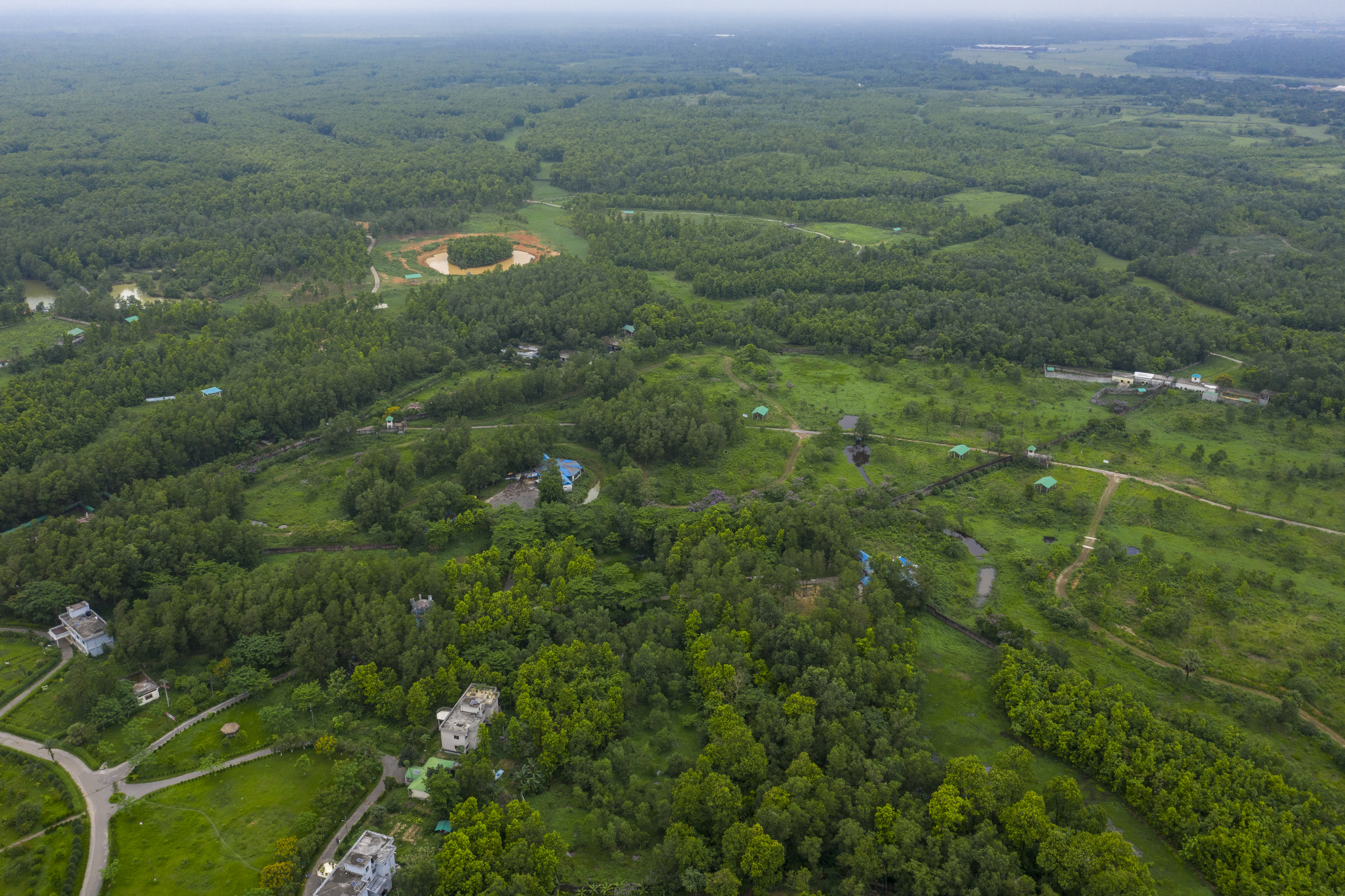
- Gazipur Safari Park

- Coordinates: 24°12′N 90°28′E
- Country: Bangladesh
- Division: Dhaka
- District: Gazipur

Area
  - Total: 462.94 km^{2} (178.74 sq mi)

Population (2022)
  - Total: 855,263
  - Density: 1,847.5/km^{2} (4,784.9/sq mi)
- Time zone: UTC+6 (BST)
- Postal code: 1740
- Area code: 06825
- Website: sreepur.gazipur.gov.bd

Sreepur Upazila also spelled Shreepur Upazila (Bengali: শ্রীপুর উপজেলা, romanized: śrīpur upajilā) is an upazila (sub-district) of Gazipur District in central Bangladesh, part of the Dhaka Division.

== Geography ==
Sreepur is located at 24.2000°N 90.4667°E. It has 122,872 households and total area 462.94 km^{2}.

== Demographics ==
Religions in Sreepur Upazila (2022)
Religion	Percent
Islam	96.64%
Hinduism	3.16%
Other or not stated	0.20%

According to the 2022 Bangladeshi census, Sreepur Upazila had 249,735 households and a population of 855,263. 8.58% of the population were under 5 years of age. Sreepur had a literacy rate (age 7 and over) of 78.15%: 80.58% for males and 75.50% for females, and a sex ratio of 108.38 males for every 100 females. 302,230 (35.34%) lived in urban areas.

According to the 2011 Census of Bangladesh, Sreepur Upazila had 122,872 households and a population of 492,792. 103,330 (20.97%) were under 10 years of age. Sreepur had a literacy rate (age 7 and over) of 54.76%, compared to the national average of 51.8%, and a sex ratio of 961 females per 1000 males. 126,249 (25.62%) lived in urban areas.

At the 1991 census Bangladesh census, Sreepur had a population of 320,530, of which 166,988 were aged 18 or older. Males constituted 51.13% of the population, and females 48.87%. Sreepur had an average literacy rate of 30.3% (7+ years), against the national average of 32.4%.

== Administration ==
Sreepur Upazila is divided into Sreepur Municipality and eight union parishads: Barmi, Gazipur, Gosinga, Kaoraid, Maona, Prahladpur, Rajabari, and Telihati. The union parishads are subdivided into 81 mauzas and 172 villages.

Sreepur Municipality is subdivided into 9 wards and 20 mahallas.

== See also ==
- Upazilas of Bangladesh
- Districts of Bangladesh
- Divisions of Bangladesh
