= Kendua, Tangail =

Kendua কেন্দুয়া
- Location in Bangladesh
- Country: Bangladesh
- Division: Dhaka Division
- District: Tangail District

Kendua (Bengali: কেন্দুয়া) is a village in Birtara Union under Dhanbari Upazila of Tangail District, Bangladesh.

According to the 2011 Bangladesh census, Kendua had 429 households and a population of 1,705. 9.3% of the population was under the age of 5. The literacy rate (age 7 and over) was 37.7%, compared to the national average of 51.8%.

A 6.6 kilometres (4.1 mi) long road to Paiska, built at a cost of 4.75 crore taka ($561,000 in 2019), was inaugurated on 4 October 2019.

The village is on the bank of Jhinai River. There is a secondary school in the village, Kendua High School.

== Gallery ==
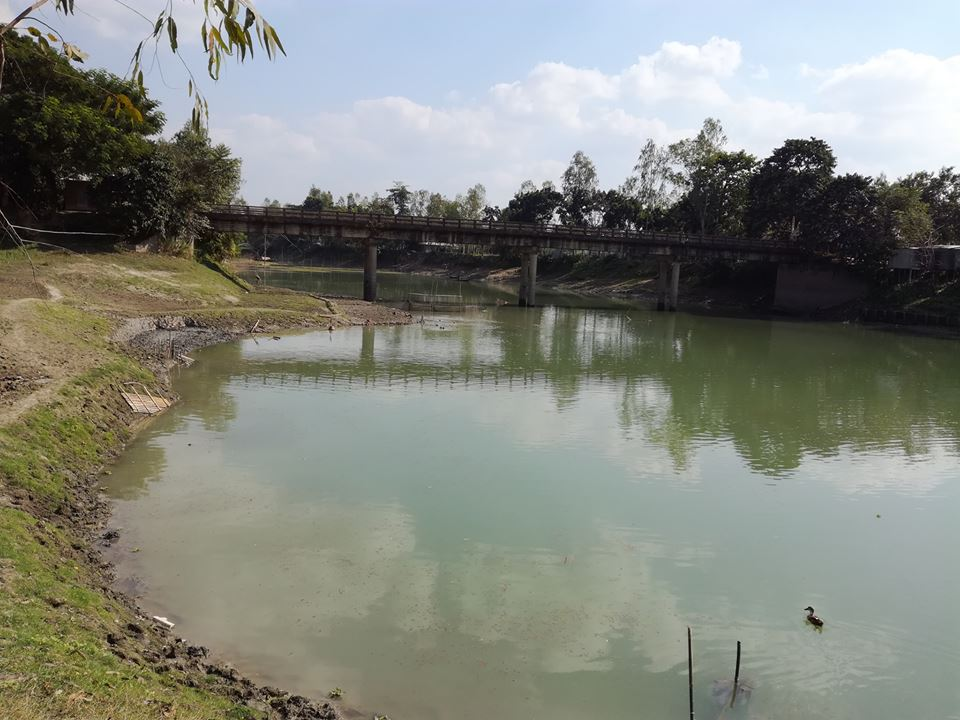
Kendua Bridge on the Jhinai River

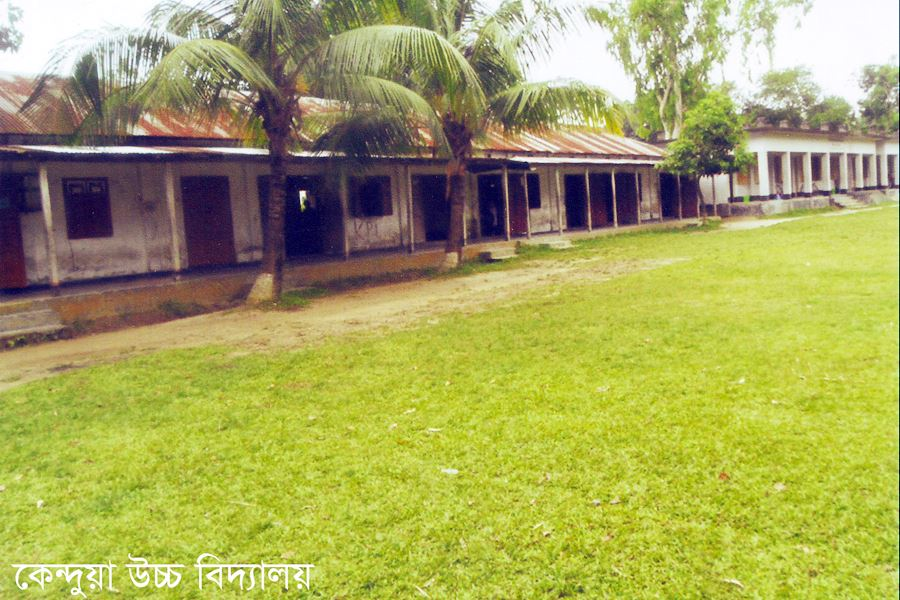
Kendua High School
