= Jadunathpur Union =

Jadunathpur Union যদুনাথপুর ইউনিয়ন
- Location of Jadunathpur Union in Bangladesh
- Coordinates: 24.6789293°N 89.9497515°E
- Country: Bangladesh
- Division: Dhaka Division
- District: Tangail District
- Upazila: Dhanbari Upazila
- Established: 1984

Government
  - Type: Union Council
  - Chairman: Mir Firoz Ahmed (Bangladesh Awami League)

Area
  - Total: 24.5 km^{2} (9.5 sq mi)
- Elevation: 21 m (69 ft)

Population (2011)
  - Total: 30,392
  - Density: 1,240/km^{2} (3,210/sq mi)
- Time zone: UTC+6 (BST)
- Postal code: 1997
- Website: jadunathpurup.tangail.gov.bd

Jadunathpur Union (Bengali: যদুনাথপুর ইউনিয়ন) is a union of Dhanbari Upazila, Tangail District, Bangladesh. It is situated 61 kilometres (38 mi) north of Tangail.

== Demographics ==
According to the 2011 Bangladesh census, Jadunathpur Union had 1,241 households and a population of 30,392. The literacy rate (age 7 and over) was 44.9% (male: 46.9%, female: 43%).

== See also ==
- Union Councils of Tangail District
