= Dhopakhali Union =

Dhopakhali Union ধোপাখালী ইউনিয়ন
- Location of Dhopakhali in Bangladesh
- Coordinates: 24.65825024°N 90.01012802°E
- Country: Bangladesh
- Division: Dhaka Division
- District: Tangail District
- Upazila: Dhanbari Upazila
- Established on: 1984

Government
  - Type: Union Council
  - Chairman: Md Akbar Hossain

Area
  - Total: 16.34 km^{2} (6.31 sq mi)
- Elevation: 17 m (56 ft)

Population (2011)
  - Total: 22,953
  - Density: 1,405/km^{2} (3,638/sq mi)
- Time zone: UTC+6 (BST)
- Postal code: 1997
- Website: dhopakhaliup.tangail.gov.bd

Dhopakhali Union (Bengali: ধোপাখালী ইউনিয়ন) is a union parishad of Dhanbari Upazila, Tangail District, Bangladesh. It is situated 57 km north of Tangail.

== Demographics ==
According to Population Census 2011 performed by Bangladesh Bureau of Statistics, The total population of Dhopakhali union is 22953. There are 5897 households in total.

== Education ==
The literacy rate of Dhopakhali Union is 40.6% (Male-41.6%, Female-39.5%).

== See also ==
- Union Councils of Tangail District
