= Mushuddi Union =

Mushuddi Union মুশুদ্দি ইউনিয়ন
- Location of Mushuddi in Bangladesh
- Coordinates: 24.671513°N 89.900018°E
- Country: Bangladesh
- Division: Dhaka Division
- District: Tangail District
- Upazila: Dhanbari Upazila
- Established on: 1984

Government
  - Type: Union Council

Area
  - Total: 11.66 km^{2} (4.50 sq mi)
- Elevation: 17 m (56 ft)

Population (2011)
  - Total: 15,796
  - Density: 1,355/km^{2} (3,509/sq mi)
- Time zone: UTC+6 (BST)
- Postal code: 1997
- Website: mushuddiup.tangail.gov.bd

Mushuddi Union (Bengali: মুশুদ্দি ইউনিয়ন) is a union parishad of Dhanbari Upazila, Tangail District, Bangladesh. It is situated 65 km north of Tangail.

== Demographics ==
According to Population Census 2011 performed by Bangladesh Bureau of Statistics, The total population of Mushuddi union is 15,796. There are 4195 households in total.

== Education ==
The literacy rate of Mushuddi Union is 37.9% (Male-39.3%, Female-36.7%).

== See also ==
- Union Councils of Tangail District
