= Kendua High School =

- কেন্দুয়া উচ্চ বিদ্যালয়

Location
- Kendua, Dhanbari Upazila; Tangail, 2050; Bangladesh
- Coordinates: 24.414°N 89.5655°E

Information
- Established: 1971
- School board: Dhaka Education Board
- School code: 114357
- Gender: Boys & Girls
- Enrollment: 500
- Language: Bengali
- Campus type: Urban
- Sports: Football, cricket, volleyball
- Website: kenduahighschool.edu.bd

Kendua High School (Bengali: কেন্দুয়া উচ্চ বিদ্যালয়), is a non-government educational institution in Kendua, Tangail, Dhaka Division, Bangladesh. Established in 1971, the school offers education for students ranging from grade six to SSC (Secondary School Certificate) with over 500 students enrolled. The school is under the direct control of the Ministry of Education.

== Location ==
The school is in Kendua, Dhanbari Upazila, 65 km from Tangail, Mymensingh and Jamalpur district headquarters and 190 km from the national capital Dhaka. The school is on the bank of Jhinai River.

== Gallery ==
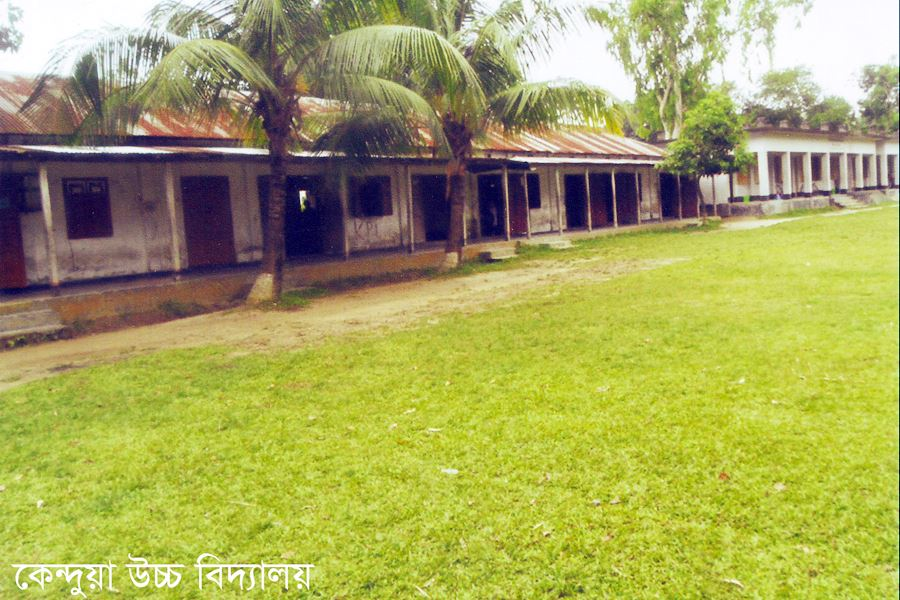
School building

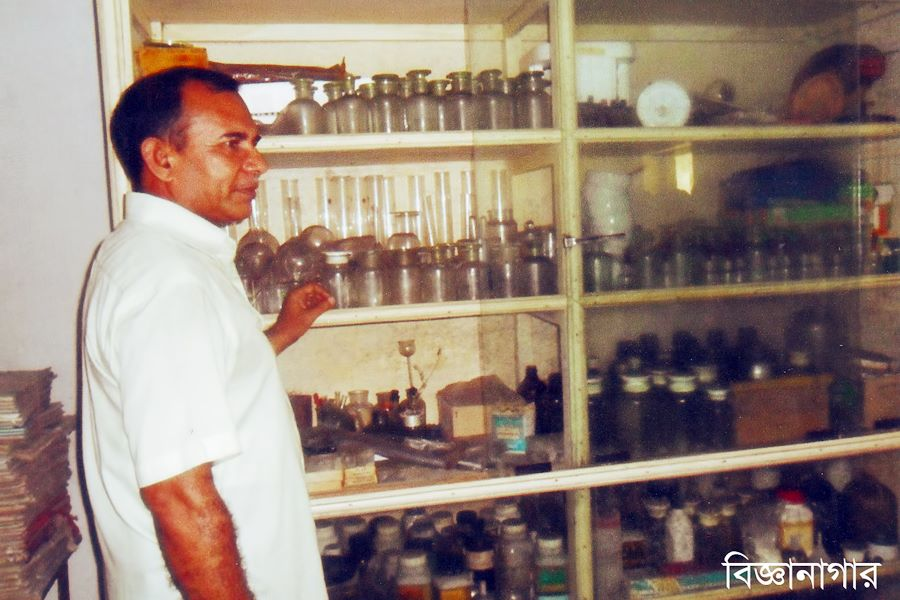
Science laboratory

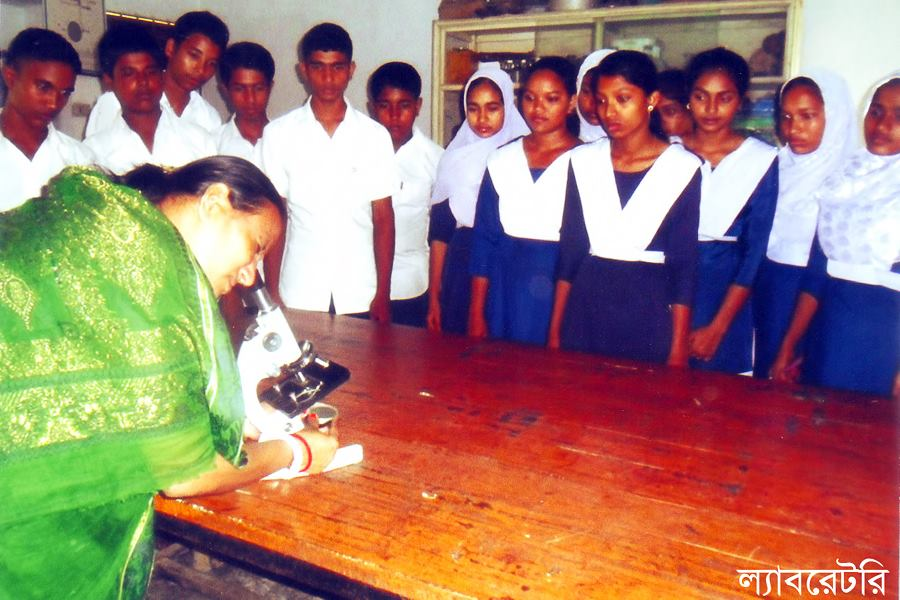
Microscope in lab
