= Paiska High School =

- পাইস্কা উচ্চ বিদ্যালয়
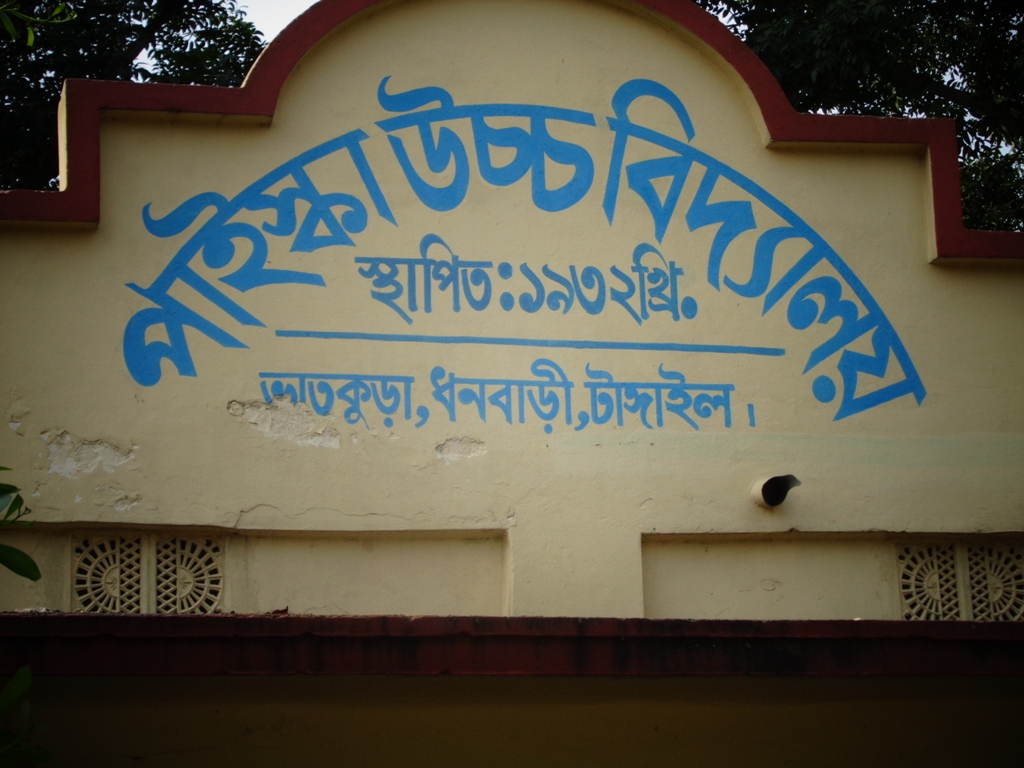
- Paiska High School

Location
- Paiska, Dhanbari Upazila; Tangail, 1997; Bangladesh
- Coordinates: 24.685°N 89.949°E

Information
- Established: 1932
- School board: Dhaka Education Board
- School code: 114365
- Gender: Boys & Girls
- Enrollment: 500
- Language: Bengali
- Campus type: Rural
- Sports: Football, cricket, volleyball

Paiska High School (Bengali: পাইস্কা উচ্চ বিদ্যালয়), is a non-government educational institution in Paiska, Tangail, Dhaka Division, Bangladesh established in 1932. The school offers education for students ranging from six to SSC (Secondary School Certificate) with over 500 students. The school is under the direct control of the Ministry of Education.

== Location ==
The school is located along the Dhanbari-Kendua highway Paiska, Vatkura, Dhanbari Upazila, 65 km from Tangail, Mymensingh and Jamalpur district headquarters and 190 km from Dhaka city. The school is on the bank of Bairan canal.

== Gallery ==
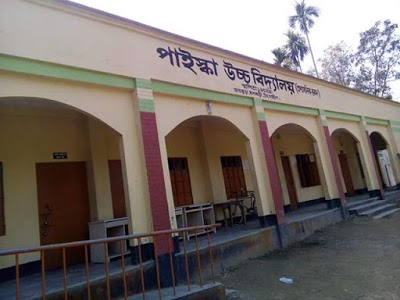
School building

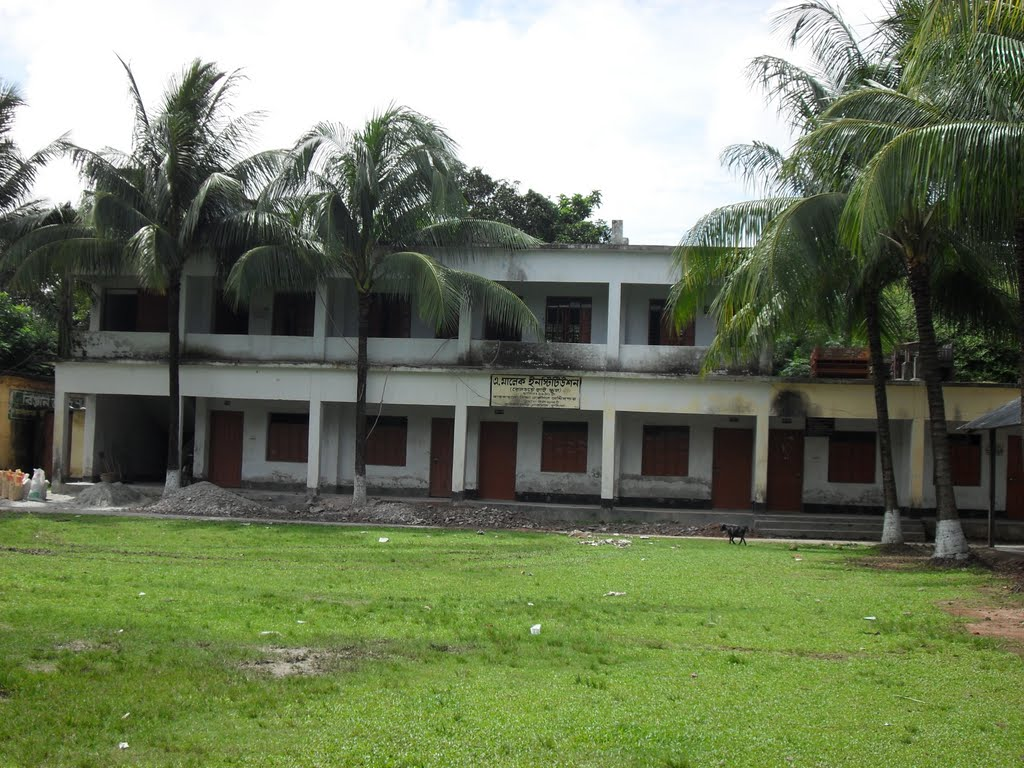
School building
