= Bolibhadra Union =

Bolibhadra Union বলিভদ্র ইউনিয়ন
- Location of Bolibhadra in Bangladesh
- Coordinates: 24.70442006°N 90.00583649°E
- Country: Bangladesh
- Division: Dhaka Division
- District: Tangail District
- Upazila: Dhanbari Upazila
- Established: 1984

Government
  - Type: Union Council
  - Chairman: Md Suruzzaman Montu (Bangladesh Awami League)

Area
  - Total: 11.22 km^{2} (4.33 sq mi)
- Elevation: 25 m (82 ft)

Population (2011)
  - Total: 13,898
  - Density: 1,239/km^{2} (3,208/sq mi)
- Time zone: UTC+6 (BST)
- Postal code: 1997
- Website: http://bolibodrowup.tangail.gov.bd/

Bolibhadra Union (Bengali: বলিভদ্র ইউনিয়ন) is a union of Dhanbari Upazila, Tangail District, Bangladesh. It is situated 64 kilometres (40 mi) north of Tangail.

== Demographics ==
According to the 2011 Bangladesh census, Bolibhadra Union had 3,550 households and a population of 13,898. The literacy rate (age 7 and over) was 44.2% (male: 46.3%, female: 42.2%).

== See also ==
- Union Councils of Tangail District
