= Baniajan Union =

Baniajan Union বানিয়াজান ইউনিয়ন
- Location of Baniajan in Bangladesh
- Coordinates: 24.6789293°N 89.9497515°E
- Country: Bangladesh
- Division: Dhaka Division
- District: Tangail District
- Upazila: Dhanbari Upazila
- Established on: 1984

Government
  - Type: Union Council
  - Chairman: Shamsul Alam Talukdar

Area
  - Total: 12.94 km^{2} (5.00 sq mi)
- Elevation: 21 m (69 ft)

Population (2011)
  - Total: 17,271
  - Density: 1,335/km^{2} (3,457/sq mi)
- Time zone: UTC+6 (BST)
- Postal code: 1997
- Website: baniajanup.tangail.gov.bd

Baniajan Union (Bengali: বানিয়াজান ইউনিয়ন) is a union parishad of Dhanbari Upazila, Tangail District, Bangladesh. It is situated 67 km north of Tangail.

== Demographics ==
According to Population Census 2011 performed by Bangladesh Bureau of Statistics, The total population of Baniajan union is 17271. There are 4760 households in total.

== Education ==
The literacy rate of Baniajan Union is 41.2% (Male-43.6%, Female-39%).

== See also ==
- Union Councils of Tangail District
