= Birtara Union =

Birtara Union বীরতারা ইউনিয়ন 1238
- Location of Birtara in Bangladesh
- Coordinates: 24.7057°N 89.9063°E
- Country: Bangladesh
- Division: Dhaka Division
- District: Tangail District
- Upazila: Dhanbari Upazila
- Established on: 1984

Government
  - Type: Union Council
  - Chairman: Md. Ishaque Sikder

Area
  - Total: 13.21 km^{2} (5.10 sq mi)
- Elevation: 17 m (56 ft)

Population (2011)
  - Total: 18,481
  - Density: 1,399/km^{2} (3,623/sq mi)
- Time zone: UTC+6 (BST)
- Postal code: 1997
- Website: birtaraup.tangail.gov.bd

Birtara Union (Bengali: বীরতারা ইউনিয়ন) is a union parishad of Dhanbari Upazila, Tangail District, Bangladesh. It is situated 66 km north of Tangail. Birtara Union Code - 1238.

== Gallery ==
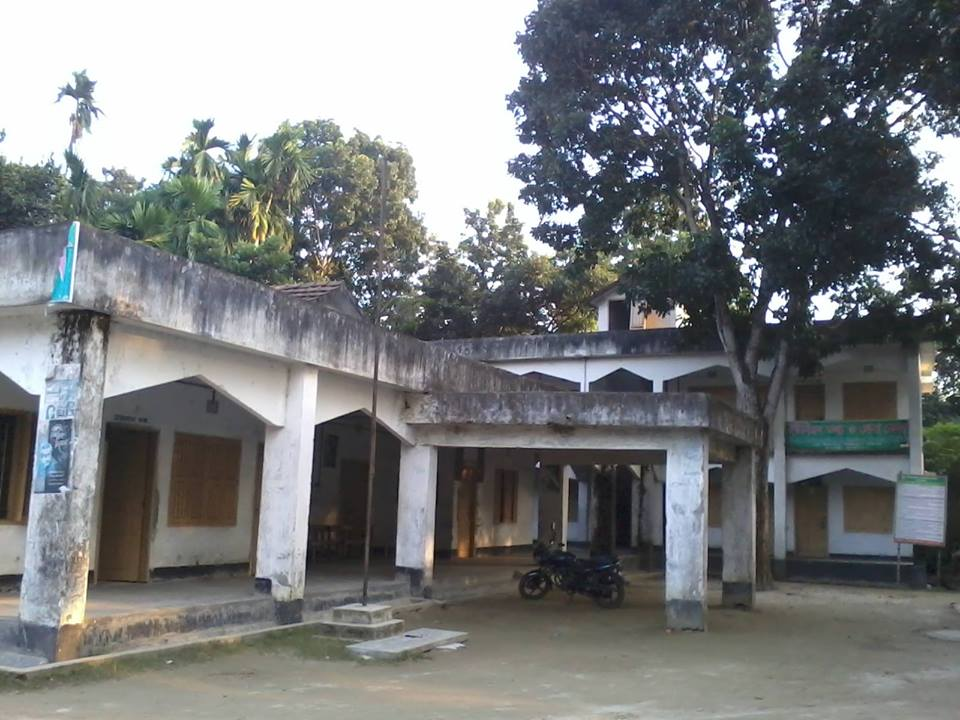
Union Complex

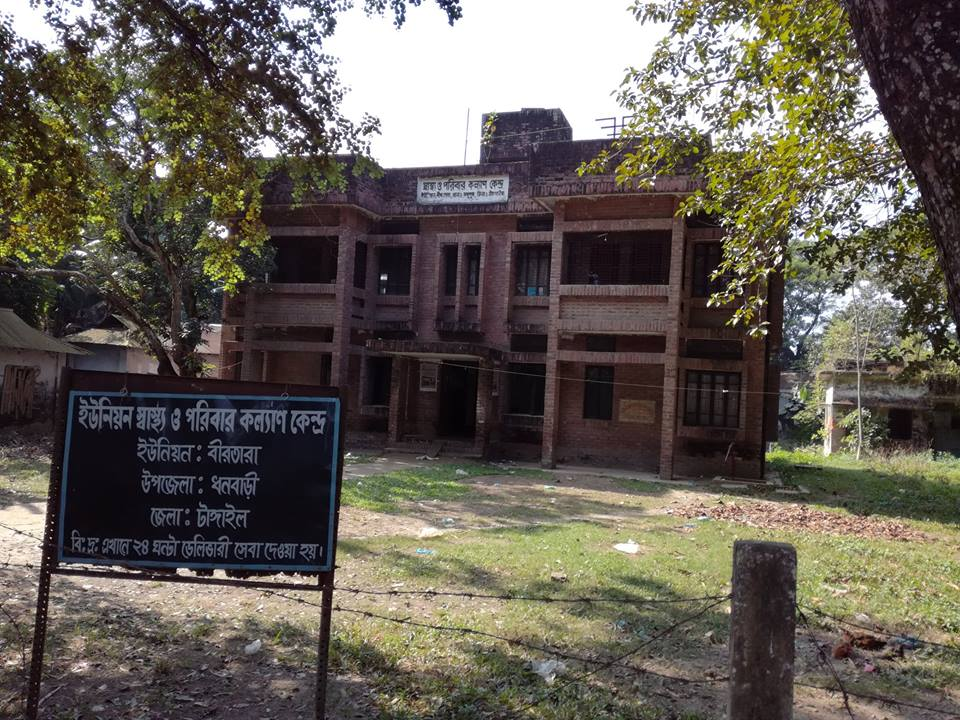
Union health Complex

== Demographics ==
According to Population Census 2011 performed by Bangladesh Bureau of Statistics, The total population of Birtara union is 18481. There are 4849 households in total.

== Education ==
There are two secondary schools in the union: Bajitpur Amir Hossain High School and Kendua High School.

The literacy rate of Birtara Union is 39.9% (Male-42.7%, Female-37.3%).

== See also ==
- Rajarhat
- Bajitpur
- Union Councils of Tangail District
