= Paiska Union =

Paiska Union পাইস্কা ইউনিয়ন
- Location of Mushuddi in Bangladesh
- Coordinates: 24.70276308°N 89.88988996°E
- Country: Bangladesh
- Division: Dhaka Division
- District: Tangail District
- Upazila: Dhanbari Upazila
- Established on: 1984

Government
  - Type: Union Council
  - Chairman: Arif Bazlu

Area
  - Total: 11.66 km^{2} (4.50 sq mi)
- Elevation: 19 m (62 ft)

Population (2011)
  - Total: 21,152
  - Density: 1,814/km^{2} (4,698/sq mi)
- Time zone: UTC+6 (BST)
- Postal code: 1997
- Website: paiskaup.tangail.gov.bd

Paiska Union (Bengali: পাইস্কা ইউনিয়ন) is a union parishad of Dhanbari Upazila, Tangail District, Bangladesh. It is situated 64 km north of Tangail.

== Demographics ==
According to Population Census 2011 performed by Bangladesh Bureau of Statistics, The total population of Paiska union is 21152. There are 5587 households in total.

== Education ==
The literacy rate of Paiska Union is 42.5% (Male-44.4%, Female-40.7%).

== See also ==
- Union Councils of Tangail District
