= Dhanbari Upazila =

Dhanbari ধনবাড়ী
- Upazila
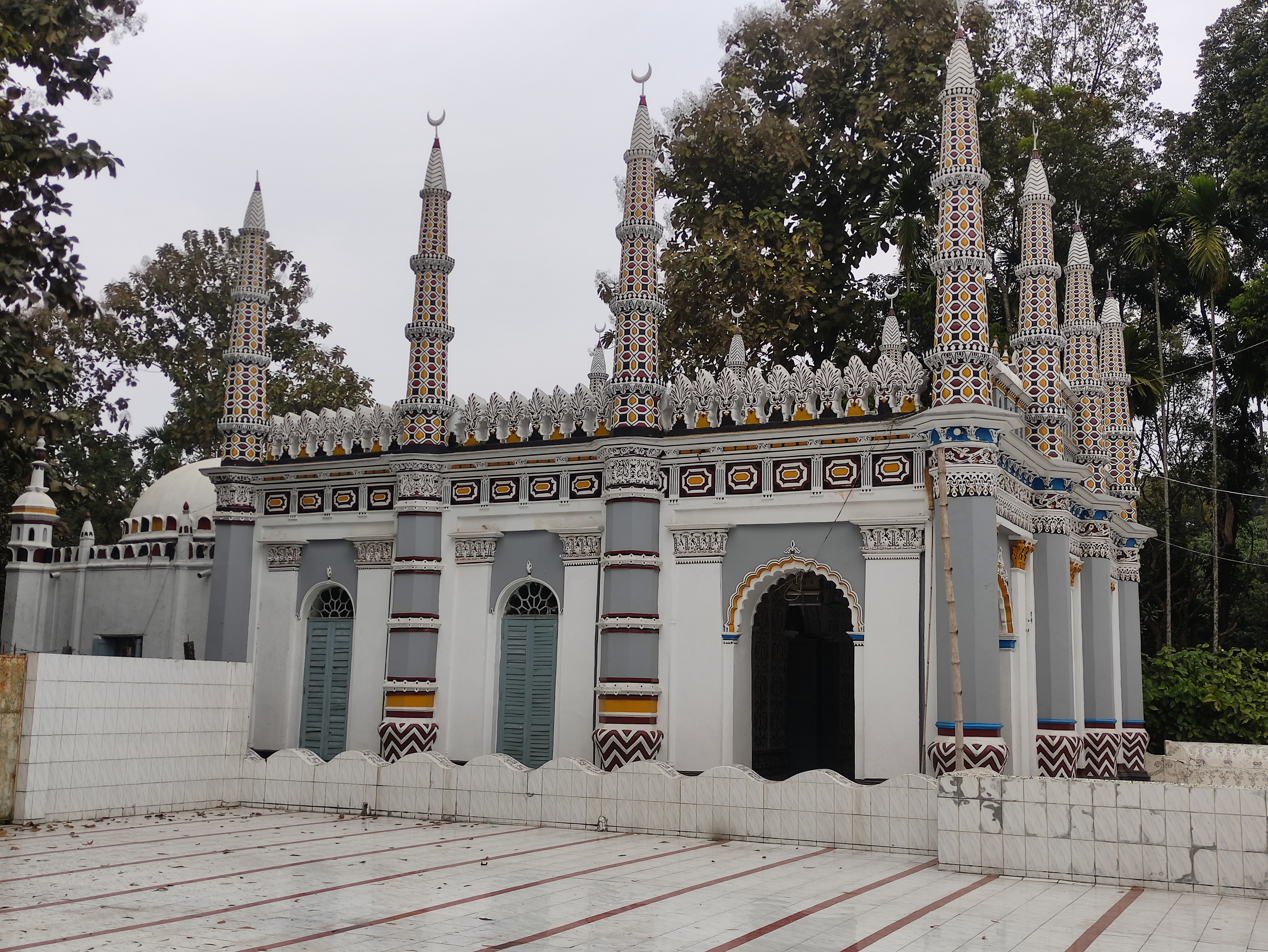
- Dhanbari Mosque

- Coordinates: 24°37′N 90°1.5′E
- Country: Bangladesh
- Division: Dhaka
- District: Tangail
- Headquarters: Dhanbari

Area
  - Total: 133.75 km^{2} (51.64 sq mi)

Population (2022)
  - Total: 189,129
  - Density: 1,414.0/km^{2} (3,662.4/sq mi)
- Time zone: UTC+6 (BST)
- Postal code: 1997
- Website: dhanbari.tangail.gov.bd

Dhanbari Upazila mauza geocode map

Dhanbari (Bengali: ধনবাড়ী) is an Upazila under Tangail District in the Dhaka Division, Bangladesh. It was established when former Madhupur Upazila was split into two Upazilas in 2006. The then prime Minister Begum Khaleda Zia laid the foundation of this newly formed Dhanbari Upazila by the efforts of Fakir Mahbub Anam Swapan, Member of the National Executive Committee of Bangladesh Nationalist Party (BNP).

== Demographics ==
Religions in Dhanbari Upazila (2022)
Religion	Percent
Islam	97.37%
Hinduism	2.62%
Other or not stated	0.01%

According to the 2022 Bangladeshi census, Dhanbari Upazila had 52,011 households and a population of 189,129. 8.11% of the population were under 5 years of age. Dhanbari had a literacy rate (age 7 and over) of 67.82%: 70.01% for males and 65.80% for females, and a sex ratio of 93.62 males for every 100 females. 47,736 (25.24%) lived in urban areas.

According to the 2011 Census of Bangladesh, Dhanbari Upazila had 45,948 households and a population of 176,068. 36,851 (20.93%) were under 10 years of age. Dhanbari had a literacy rate (age 7 and over) of 44.00%, compared to the national average of 51.8%, and a sex ratio of 1051 females per 1000 males. 36,125 (20.52%) lived in urban areas.

== Administration ==
Dhanbari Upazila is divided into Dhanbari Municipality and seven union parishads: Baniajan, Birtara, Bolibhadra, Dhopakhali, Jodunathpur, Musuddi, and Paiska. The union parishads are subdivided into 103 mauzas and 132 villages.

Dhanbari Municipality is subdivided into 9 wards and 25 mahallas.

== Education ==
There are seven colleges in the upazila: Asiya Hasan Ali Mohila Degree College, Bhai Ghat Ideal College, Dhanbari College, Mushuddi Rezia College, Norilla College, Panchpotol Degree College, and Ukhariabari College.

According to Banglapedia, Govt. Dhanbari Nawab Institution, founded in 1910, Paiska High School (1960), and Pankata Islamia Secondary School (1943) are notable secondary schools.

== Notable people ==
- Nawab Syed Ali Hasan Ali Choudhury
- Dr. Sheikh Nizamul Islam, MP
- Syeda Ashika Akbar

== See also ==
- Dhanbari
- Upazilas of Bangladesh
- Districts of Bangladesh
- Divisions of Bangladesh
