= List of railway stations in Bangladesh =

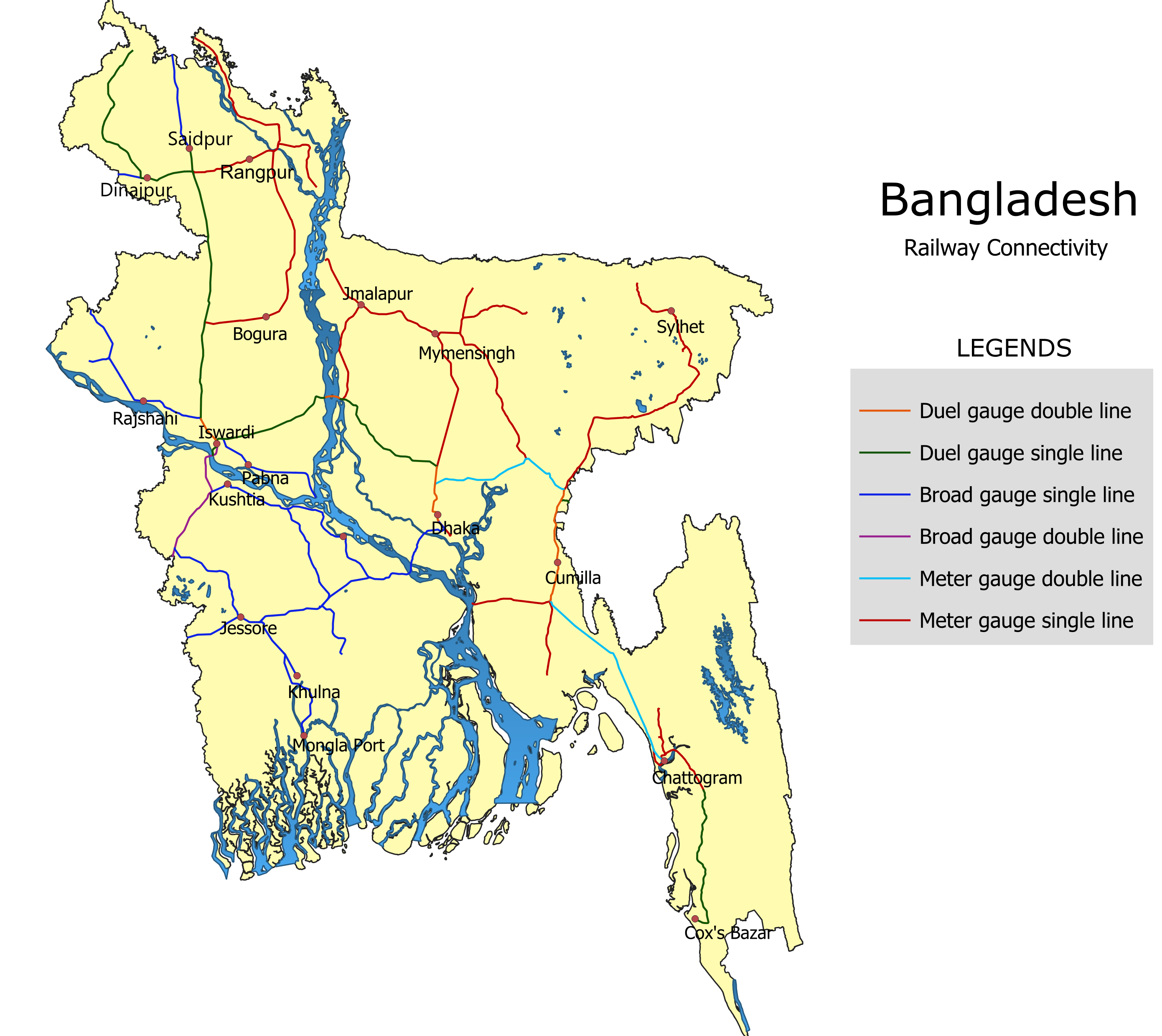
Railway map of Bangladesh

This is a list of railway stations in Bangladesh division-wise:

== Existing ==
=== Chittagong Division ===
==== Brahmanbaria District ====
1. Akhaura Junction railway station
2. Brahmanbaria railway station
3. Gangasagor Railway Station
4. Imambari Railway Station
5. Kosba Railway Station
6. Mondobag Railway Station
7. Montola Railway Station
8. Paghachang Railway Station
9. Shaldandi Railway Station
10. Shashidol Railway Station
11. Talshohor Railway Station
12. Vatshala Railway Station
13. Ashuganj Railway Station

==== Chandpur District ====
1. Balakhal Railway Station
2. Chandpur railway station
3. Chadpur Court railway station
4. Chtoshi Road Railway Station
5. Haziganj Railway Station
6. Meher Railway Station
7. Madhu Road Railway Station
8. Maishadi Railway Station
9. Shahrasti Railway Station
10. Shahtoli Railway Station
11. Waruk Railway Station

==== Chittagong District ====
1. Barobokundo Railway Station
2. Baroiyadhala Railway Station
3. Bartakia Railway Station
4. Chinki Astana Railway Station
5. Chittagong Railway Station
6. Chittagong Junction Railway Station
7. Chittagong University railway station
8. Faujdarhat Railway Station
9. Kaibollo Dham Railway Station
10. Kumira Railway Station
11. Mastan Nagar Railway Station
12. Mirshorai Railway Station
13. Nijampur College Railway Station
14. Pahartoli Railway Station
15. Sitakundo Railway Station
16. Vatiari Railway Station

==== Comilla District ====
1. Alisshor Railway Station
2. Bipulashar Railway Station
3. Comilla railway station
4. Doulotganj Railway Station
5. Gunabati Railway Station
6. Hasanpur Railway Station
7. Khila Railway Station
8. Laksam Junction Railway Station
9. Lalmai Railway Station
10. Mainamati Railway Station
11. Nangolkott Railway Station
12. Naoti Railway Station
13. Nather Petua Railway Station
14. Rajapur Railway Station
15. Sadar Rosulpur Railway Station

==== Feni District ====
1. Anandapur Railway Station
2. Bandua Daulatpur Railway Station
3. Bilonia Railway Station
4. Chithlia Railway Station
5. Fazilpur Railway Station
6. Feni Junction railway station
7. Fulgachi Railway Station
8. Kalidoho Railway Station
9. Muhuriganj Railway Station
10. Munsirhat Railway Station
11. Parshuram Railway Station
12. Pirboxhat Railway Station
13. Sharshadi Railway Station

==== Noakhali District ====
1. Bozra Railway Station
2. Choumuhoni Railway Station
3. Harinarayanpur Railway Station
4. Maizdi Court Railway Station
5. Maizdi Railway Station
6. Noakhali railway station
7. Shonaimuri Railway Station

=== Dhaka Division ===
==== Dhaka District ====
1. Banani railway station
2. Dhaka railway station
3. Dhaka Airport railway station
4. Dhaka Cantonment railway station
5. Gendaria railway station
6. Keraniganj railway station
7. Shyampur Baraitala railway station
8. Tejgaon railway station

==== Munshiganj District ====
1. Nimtala railway station
2. Mawa railway station
3. Sreenagar railway station

==== Shariatpur District ====
1. Padma railway station

==== Madaripur District ====
1. Shibchar railway station

==== Faridpur District ====
1. Ambikapur Railway Station
2. Amirabad Railway Station
3. Bakhunda Railway Station
4. Boalmari Railway Station
5. Bhanga railway station
6. Bhanga Junction railway station
7. Faridpur College railway station
8. Faridpur railway station
9. Ghorakhali Railway Station
10. Kamarkhali Ghat Railway Station
11. Madhukhali Junction Railway Station
12. Nagarkanda railway station
13. Pukhuria Railway Station
14. Shahasrail Railway Station
15. Shatoir Railway Station
16. Talma Railway Station

==== Gopalganj District ====
1. Bayspur railway station
2. Kashiani Junction railway station
3. Muksudpur railway station
4. Gopalganj railway station
5. Gobra railway station
6. Chandradhigdhalia railway station
7. Chapta railway station
8. Bhatiapara Ghat railway station
9. Choto Bahirbag railway station
10. Borasi railway station
11. Mahespur Railway station

==== Rajbari District ====
1. Rajbari railway station
2. Goalando Ghat railway station
3. Panksha Railway station
4. Kalukhali Junction railway station
5. Arkandi railway station
6. Khankhanapur railway station
7. Goalando Bazar railway station
8. Naliagram railway station
9. Pachuria Junction railway station
10. Bansantapur railway station
11. Baharpur railway station
12. Belghachi railway station
13. Machpara railway station
14. Ramdia railway station
15. Suryanagar railway station

==== Gazipur District ====
1. Arikhola Railway Station
2. Kaliakoir Hi-Tech City railway station
3. Bhawal Gazipur Railway Station
4. Dhirashram railway station
5. Izzatpur Railway Station
6. Joydebpur Junction Railway Station
7. Kaoraid Railway Station
8. Mouchak Railway Station
9. Nalchata Railway Station
10. Pubail Railway Station
11. Rajendrapur Railway Station
12. Shat Khamair Railway Station
13. Sripur Railway Station
14. Tongi Junction railway station

==== Kishoreganj District ====
1. Bajitpur Railway Station
2. Bhairab Bazar Junction railway station
3. Choyshuti Railway Station
4. Gochihata Railway Station
5. Halimpur Mokshud Railway Station
6. Joshodolpur Railway Station
7. Kalikaproshad Railway Station
8. Kishoreganj railway station
9. Kuliarchor Railway Station
10. Manikkhali Railway Station
11. Nilganj Railway Station
12. Shorarchor Railway Station

==== Narayanganj District ====
1. Chashara railway station
2. Fatullah railway station
3. Narayanganj railway station
4. Pagla Halt railway station

==== Narsingdi District ====
1. Amirgonj Railway Station
2. Doulatkandi Railway Station
3. Ghorashal Railway Station
4. Ghorashal Flag Railway Station
5. Jinarodi Railway Station
6. Hatuvanga Railway Station
7. Khanabari Railway Station
8. Methikanda Railway Station
9. Narsingdi railway station
10. Shrinidhi Railway Station

==== Tangail District ====
1. Bhuiyanpur Railway Station
2. Ibrahimabad railway Station
3. Hemnagar Railway Station
4. Korotia Railway Station
5. Mirzapur Railway Station
6. Mohera Railway Station
7. Tangail Railway Station

=== Khulna Division ===
==== Bagerhat District ====
1. Bhaga railway station
2. Chulkati Bazar railway station
3. Digraj railway station
4. Katakhali railway station
5. Mongla railway station

==== Chuadanga District ====
1. Ansarbaria Railway Station
2. Alamdanga railway station
3. Chuadanga Railway Station
4. Darshana Junction railway station
5. Darshana Halt railway station
6. Darshana railway station
7. Gaidghat Railway Station
8. Joyrampur Railway Station
9. Mominpur Railway Station
10. Munsigonj Railway Station
11. Uthli Railway Station

==== Jessore District ====
1. Benapole Railway station
2. Chengutia Railway Station
3. Jamdia railway station
4. Jashore Cantonment railway station
5. Jessore Junction Railway Station
6. Jhikargacha railway station
7. Meherullanagar railway station
8. Nabharan railway station
9. Noapara railway station
10. Godkhali Railway Station
11. Padmabila Junction railway station
12. Singia Junction railway station
13. Taltala railway station
14. Rupdia railway station

==== Jhenaidah District ====
1. Borobazar railway station
2. Kot Chandpur railway station
3. Mubarakganj railway station
4. Safdurpur railway station
5. Sunderpur railway station

==== Narail District ====
1. Narail railway station
2. Lohagara railway station

==== Khulna District ====
1. Arongghata Railway Station
2. Bejerdanga Railway Station
3. Daulatpur College Railway Station
4. Daulatpur Railway Station
5. Phultala Railway Station
6. Mohammad Nagar railway station
7. Khulna Junction Railway Station
8. Khulna Railway Station
9. Shiromoni railway station

==== Kushtia District ====
1. Bheramara railway station
2. Choraikol railway station
3. Halsha railway station
4. Jagati railway station
5. Khoksha railway station
6. Kumarkhali railway station
7. Kushtia Court railway station
8. Kushtia railway station
9. Mirpur railway station
10. Poradah Junction railway station

=== Mymensingh Division ===
==== Jamalpur District ====
1. Bahadurabad Ghat railway station
2. Bausi Railway Station
3. Boyra Railway Station
4. Dewangonj Bazar Railway Station
5. Durmuth Railway Station
6. Islampur Bazar Railway Station
7. Jaforshahi Railway Station
8. Jagannathganj Bazar railway station
9. Jagannathganj Ghat Railway Station
10. Jamalpur Court railway station
11. Jamalpur Town Junction railway station
12. Kendua Bazar Railway Station
13. Melandoho Bazar Railway Station
14. Mosharofganj Railway Station
15. Nandina Railway Station
16. Nurundi Railway Station
17. Piyarpur Railway Station
18. Shahid Nagar Railway Station
19. Sharishabari Railway Station
20. Tarakandi Railway Station

==== Mymensingh District ====
1. Agriculture University Railway Station
2. Ahmadbari Railway Station
3. Atharbari Railway Station
4. Aulianagar Railway Station
5. Baigonbari Railway Station
6. Biddyaganj Railway Station
7. Bishka Railway Station
8. Bokainagar Railway Station
9. Dhola Railway Station
10. Fatemanagar Railway Station
11. Gafargaon railway station
12. Gouripur Junction railway station
13. Ishwarganj Railway Station
14. Nandail Railway Station
15. Nimtoli Bazar Railway Station
16. Moshakhali Railway Station
17. Moshiurnagar Railway Station
18. Mushuli Railway Station
19. Mymensingh Junction railway station
20. Mymensingh Road Railway Station
21. Shohagi Railway Station
22. Shomvuganj Railway Station
23. Shutiyakhali Railway Station
24. Shyamganj Junction railway station

==== Netrokona District ====
1. Bangla Railway Station
2. Barhatta Railway Station
3. Chollishanagar Railway Station
4. Hironpur Railway Station
5. Jalshuka Railway Station
6. Jaria Jhanjail Railway Station
7. Mohonganj Railway Station
8. Netrokona Court Railway Station
9. Netrokona railway station
10. Otitpur Railway Station
11. Purbadhola Railway Station
12. Thakurkona Railway Station

=== Rajshahi Division ===
==== Bogra District ====
1. Altafnagar railway station
2. Bogra railway station
3. Chatian Gram railway station
4. Gabtali railway station
5. Helaliarhat railway station
6. Kahalu railway station
7. Nosrotpur Railway Station
8. Pachpir Majar Railway Station
9. Santahar Junction railway station
10. Sonatala Railway Station
11. Sukhanpulur Railway Station
12. Syed Ahmed College Railway Station
13. Talora Railway Station
14. Velurpara Railway Station

==== Chapai Nawabganj District ====
1. Amnura Junction Railway Station
2. Amnura Bypass Railway Station
3. Golabari Railway Station
4. Nachol Railway Station
5. Nijampur Railway Station
6. Chapainawabganj railway station
7. Rohanpur Railway Station

==== Joypurhat District ====
1. Akkelpur Railway Station
2. Bagjana Railway Station
3. Jafarpur Railway Station
4. Jamalpur railway station
5. Joypurhat Railway Station
6. Panchbibi Railway Station
7. Tilakpur Railway Station

==== Naogaon District ====
1. Ahsanganj Railway Station
2. Atrai Railway Station
3. Raninagar Railway Station
4. Shahagola Railway Station

==== Natore District ====
1. Abdulpur Junction railway station
2. Azimnagar Railway Station
3. Basudebpur Railway Station
4. Birkutsha Railway Station
5. Ishwardi Bypass railway station
6. Lokmanpur Railway Station
7. Majhgram Junction railway station
8. Madhnagar Railway Station
9. Malanchi Railway Station
10. Natore railway station
11. Noldangarhat Railway Station
12. Yasinpur Railway Station

==== Pabna District ====
1. Badherhat Railway Station
2. Bhangura Railway Station
3. Boral Bridge Railway Station
4. Chatmohor Railway Station
5. Dashuria Railway Station
6. Dhalarchar railway station
7. Dilpashar Railway Station
8. Dublia Railway Station
9. Gofurabad Railway Station
10. Guakhora Railway Station
11. Ishwardi Junction railway station
12. Kashinathpur Railway Station
13. Muladuli Railway Station
14. Pabna Railway Station
15. Pakshi Railway Station
16. Raghobpur Railway Station
17. Rooppur Railway Station
18. Sathia Rajapur Railway Station
19. Shorotnagar Railway Station
20. Tatibondho Railway Station
21. Tebunia Railway Station

==== Rajshahi District ====
1. Arani railway station
2. Belpukur Railway Station
3. Chobbishnagar Railway Station
4. Horiyan Railway Station
5. Kakonhat Railway Station
6. Lolitonagar Railway Station
7. Nandangachi Railway Station
8. Rajshahi Railway Station
9. Rajshahi Court Railway Station
10. Rajshahi University Railway Station
11. Sardah Road Railway Station
12. Shitlai Railway Station

==== Sirajganj District ====
1. Bahirgola Railway Station
2. Bangabandhu Bridge West Railway Station
3. Jamtoil railway station
4. Kalia Horipur Railway Station
5. Lahiri Mohonpur Railway Station
6. Raipur Railway Station
7. Shahid M. Monshur Ali Railway Station
8. Sholop Railway Station
9. Sirajganj Bazar railway station
10. Sirajganj Ghat Railway Station, W, river port terminus of branch from Iswardi, bypassed by Jamuna Bridge in 2003
11. Ullapara Railway Station

=== Rangpur Division ===
==== Dinajpur District ====
1. Bajnahar Railway Station
2. Bhabanipur Railway Station
3. Bilaichondi Railway Station
4. Birampur Railway Station
5. Biral Railway Station
6. Chirirbondor Railway Station
7. Dangapara Railway Station
8. Dinajpur Railway Station
9. Fulbari Railway Station
10. Hili Railway Station
11. Kanchon Railway Station
12. Kaugaon Railway Station
13. Kholahati Railway Station
14. Mollapara Railway Station
15. Mongolpur Railway Station
16. Monmothpur Railway Station
17. Parbatipur Junction Railway Station
18. Setabgonj Railway Station
19. Sultanpur School Railway Station

==== Kurigram District ====
1. Balabari Railway Station
2. Chilmari Railway Station
3. Kurigram railway station
4. Panchpir Railway Station
5. Puraton Kurigram Railway Station
6. Rajarhat Railway Station
7. Ramna Bazar Railway Station
8. Shinger Dabrihat Railway Station
9. Tograihat Railway Station
10. Ulipur Railway Station

==== Lalmonirhat District ====
1. Aditmari Railway Station
2. Alauddinnagar Railway Station
3. Baura Railway Station
4. Bhotmari Railway Station
5. Borokhata Railway Station
6. Burimari Railway Station
7. Hatibandha Railway Station
8. Kakina Railway Station
9. Lalmonirhat Railway Station
10. Mogalhat Railway Station
11. Mohendronagar Railway Station
12. Namurirhat Railway Station
13. Patgram Railway Station
14. Roishbag Railway Station
15. Shahid Borhannagar Railway Station
16. Tista Railway Station
17. Tushvandar Railway Station

==== Nilphamari District ====
1. Chilahati Railway Station
2. Darowani Railway Station
3. Domar Railway Station
4. Khoyratnagar Railway Station
5. Mirzaganj Railway Station
6. Nilphamari College Railway Station
7. Nilphamari railway station
8. Saidpur Railway Station
9. Torunbari Railway Station

==== Rangpur District ====
1. Awliaganj Railway Station
2. Annadannagar Railway Station
3. Bodorganj Railway Station
4. Choudhurani Railway Station
5. Kaunia Railway Station
6. Mirbag Railway Station
7. Pirgacha Railway Station
8. Rangpur Railway Station
9. Shyampur Railway Station

=== Sylhet Division ===
==== Habiganj District ====
1. Loshkorpur Railway Station
2. Rashidpur Railway Station
3. Satiajuri Railway Station
4. Shaestagonj Railway Station
5. Shahzibazar Railway Station
6. Shutang Railway Station

==== Moulvibazar District ====
1. Boromchal Railway Station
2. Chokapon Railway Station
3. Kulaura Junction Railway Station
4. Monu Railway Station
5. Longla Railway Station
6. Shamshernagar Railway Station
7. Shatgaon Railway Station
8. Srimangal Railway Station
9. Tilgaon Railway Station
10. Vanugach Railway Station

==== Sunamganj District ====
1. Afzalabad Railway Station
2. Chhatak Bazar Railway Station

==== Sylhet District ====
1. Fenchugonj Railway Station
2. Khajanjigaon Railway Station
3. Maizgaon Railway Station
4. Moglabazar Railway Station
5. Shotpur Halt Railway Station
6. Sylhet Railway Station
7. Vatera Bazar Railway Station

== Proposed and Under Construction ==
=== Rajshahi Division ===
- Chandaikona Railway Station
- Rayganj Railway Station
- Chhonka Railway Station
- Sherpur Railway Station
- Aria Bazar Railway Station
- Ranir Hat Railway Station

=== Khulna Division ===
- Magura railway station
- Jhinaidah railway station
- Satkhira Railway Station
- Bag Anchra railway station
- Kalaroa railway station
- Bhomra railway station
- Parulia railway station
- Kaliganj railway station
- Shymnagar railway station
- Munsjiganj Forest Office railway station
- Damurhuda railway station
- Karpashdanga railway station
- Mujibnagar railway station
- Monakhali railway station
- Meherpur railway station

== See also ==
- List of passenger trains in Bangladesh
- List of rail accidents in Bangladesh
- List of railway lines in Bangladesh
