= Ibrahimabad railway station =

Railway Station in Tangail District, Bangladesh

Ibrahimabad ইব্রাহিমাবাদ
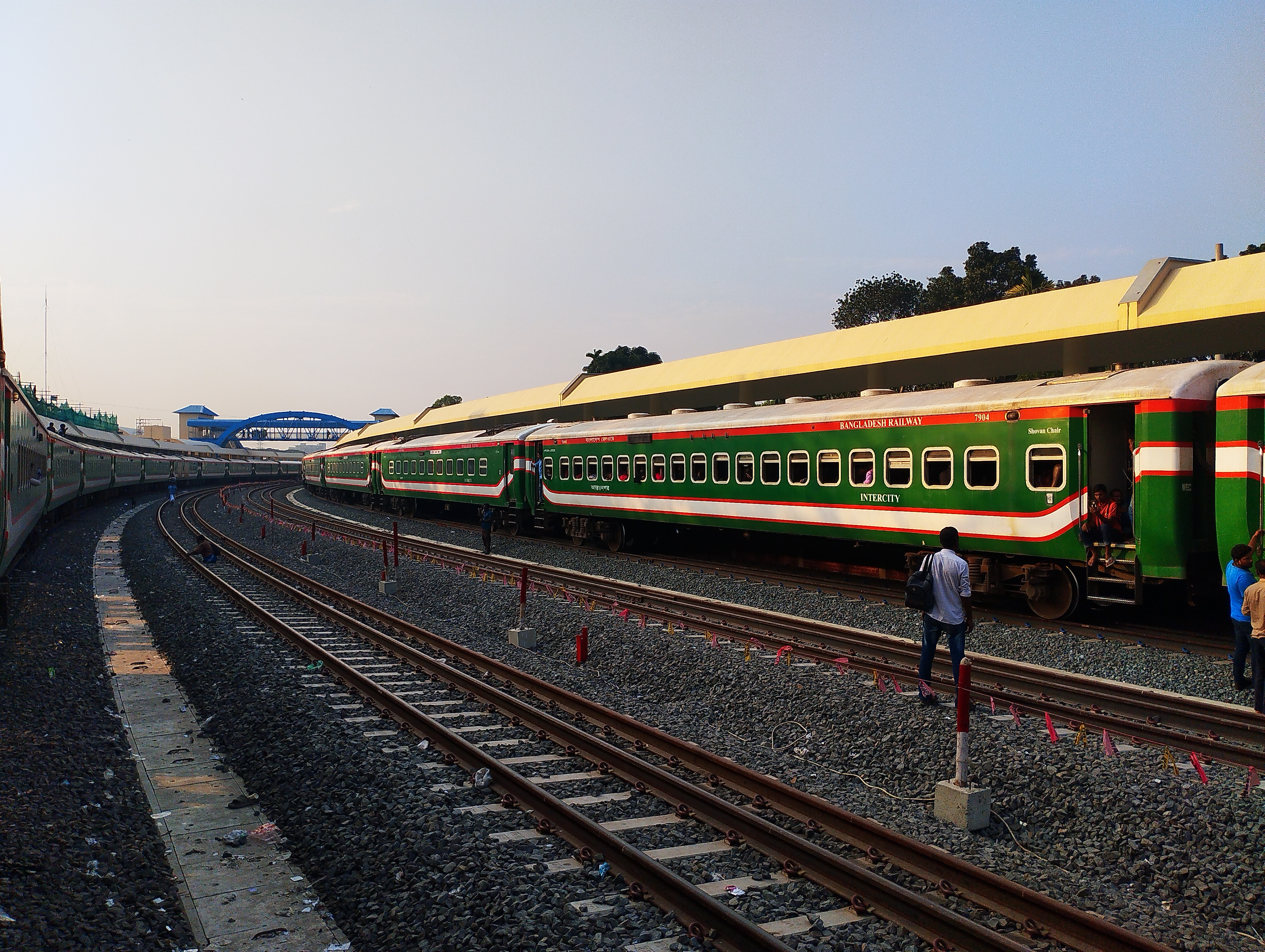

General information
- Other names: Bangabandhu Bridge East Railway Station
- Location: Ibrahimabad, Bhuapur Upazila,Tangail District; Bangladesh
- Coordinates: 24°23′23″N 89°49′11″E
- System: Passenger train station
- Owner: Bangladesh Railway
- Lines: Jamtoil–Joydebpur line Jamalpur - Ibrahimabad Line
- Platforms: 3
- Tracks: Dual Gauge

Construction
- Structure type: Standard (on ground station)

Other information
- Status: Functioning
- Station code: BBE(B)
- Zone(s): West Zone
- Division(s): Pakshi

History
- Opened: 2003; 23 years ago

Services
Preceding station	Bangladesh Railway	Following station
Jamuna Bridge West	Line; Jamtoil–Joydebpur line	Tangail
Terminus	Line; Jamalpur -Ibrahimabad line	Bhuapur
Location

Ibrahimabad Railway Station, formerly Bangabandhu Bridge East Railway Station, is a railway station located at Ibrahimabad, Bhuapur Upazila, in Tangail District. The station was built in 2003 as part of the Jamuna Bridge railway connecting project. When it first opened, it was known as Ibrahimabad railway station. But in 2010, the railway changed its name to Bangabandhu Bridge East railway station. In 2024, it changed its name back to Ibrahimabad railway station.
