= Pabna railway station =

Railway station in Bangladesh

Pabna পাবনা
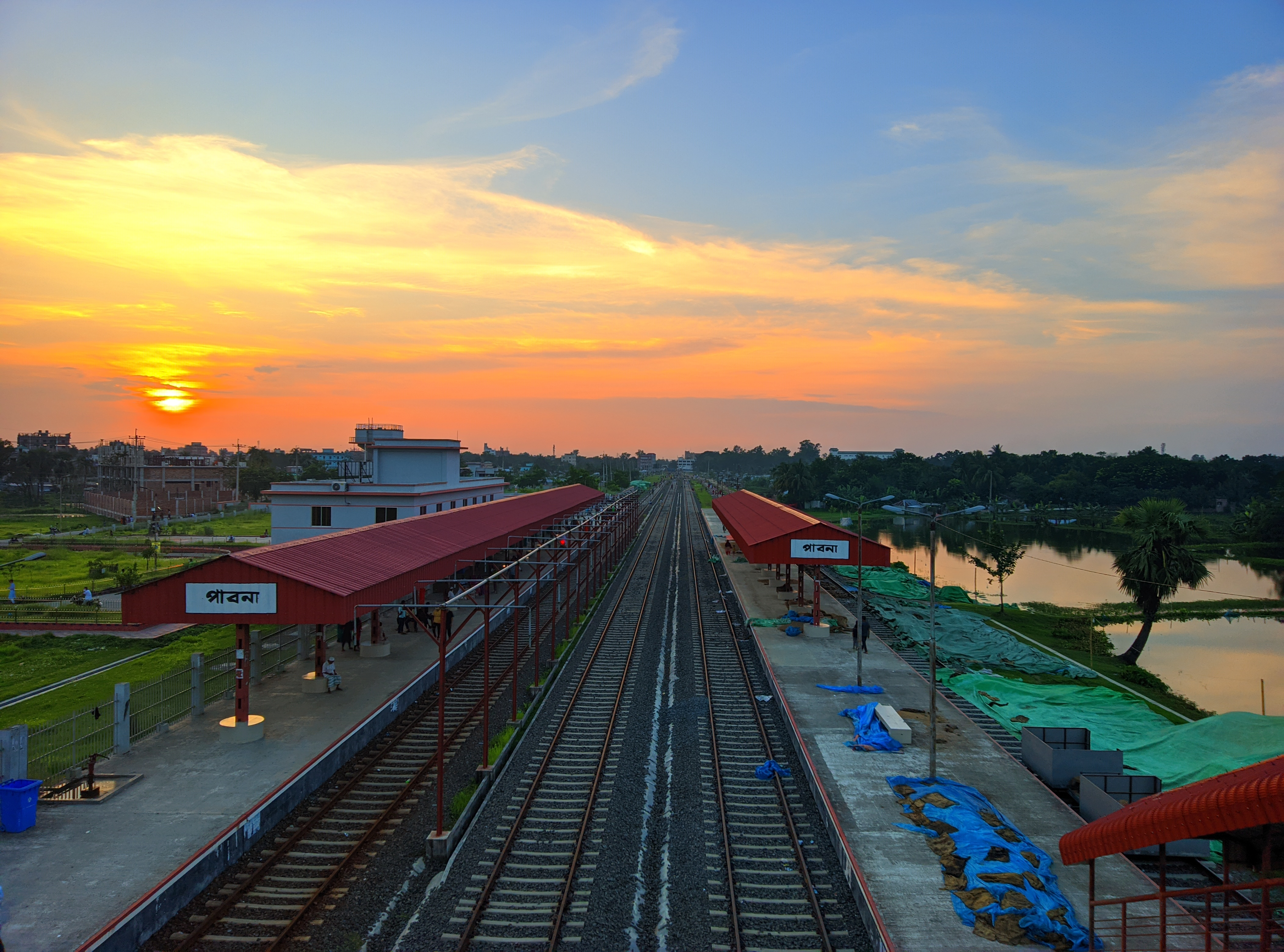
- Pabna Railway Station

General information
- Location: Pabna, Pabna Sadar Upazila, Pabna District; Bangladesh
- Coordinates: 24.0160727°N 89.2535493°E
- Owner: Bangladesh Railway
- Line: Majhgram–Dhalarchar line
- Tracks: Broad Gauge

Construction
- Structure type: Standard (on ground station)
- Parking: Yes
- Cycle facilities: Yes
- Accessible: Yes

Other information
- Status: Constructing
- Station code: PUB
- Zone(s): West Zone
- Division(s): Paksey

History
- Opened: 2018

Services
Preceding station	Bangladesh Railway	Following station
Tebunia towards Majhgram Junction	Majhgram–Dhalarchar	Raghabhpur towards Dhalarchar
Route map
Location

Pabna Railway Station is a railway station on the Majhgram–Dhalarchar branch of Ishwardi–Sirajganj line located in Pabna, Bangladesh. It is situated in Laskarpur area in the city.

== History ==
In 1974, the project of constructing a railway line from Ishwardi to Nagarbari Ghat via Pabna was taken up. But the project was terminated in 1979. after three years of the assassination of the country's prime minister Sheikh Mujibur Rahman in a military coup. It was decided to resume the project in 2010 after Second Hasina ministry came to power. The route of the proposed railway was changed from the last station Nagarbari to Dhalarchar. In 2017, after the completion of the construction work of the Majhgram to Pabna section of the railway line, the train trail started in this section. On 14 July 2018, the Majhgram–Pabna section of the railway line was opened for train traffic. Pabna railway station started operation on the same day. After the complete construction of the railway line in 2019, trails were run in November.

== See also ==
- Bangladesh Railway
- Rooppur railway station
- Khulna railway station
