= Sirajganj Bazar railway station =

Railway station in Sirajganj District, Bangladesh

Sirajganj Bazar সিরাজগঞ্জ বাজার

General information
- Location: Sirajganj, Sirajganj District, Rajshahi Division; Bangladesh
- Coordinates: 24.449925°N 89.704992°E
- Owner: Bangladesh Railway
- Line: Ishwardi–Sirajganj line
- Platforms: 1
- Tracks: 4

Construction
- Structure type: Standard (on ground station)
- Parking: Yes
- Cycle facilities: Yes
- Accessible: Yes

Other information
- Status: Opened
- Station code: SJYB
- Zone(s): West Zone
- Division(s): Pakshi

History
- Opened: 1916; 110 years ago

Services
Preceding station	Bangladesh Railway	Following station
Sirajganj Raipur towards Ishwardi Junction	Ishwardi–Sirajganj	Sirajganj Ghat towards Tarakandi
Location

Sirajganj Bazar railway station is a railway station in Sirajganj. This the main station of Sirajganj although it has 2 more stations. The station is located on the Ishwardi–Sirajganj line.
