= Jamuna Railway Bridge =

Longest Railway bridge in Bangladesh

Jamuna Railway Bridge যমুনা রেল সেতু
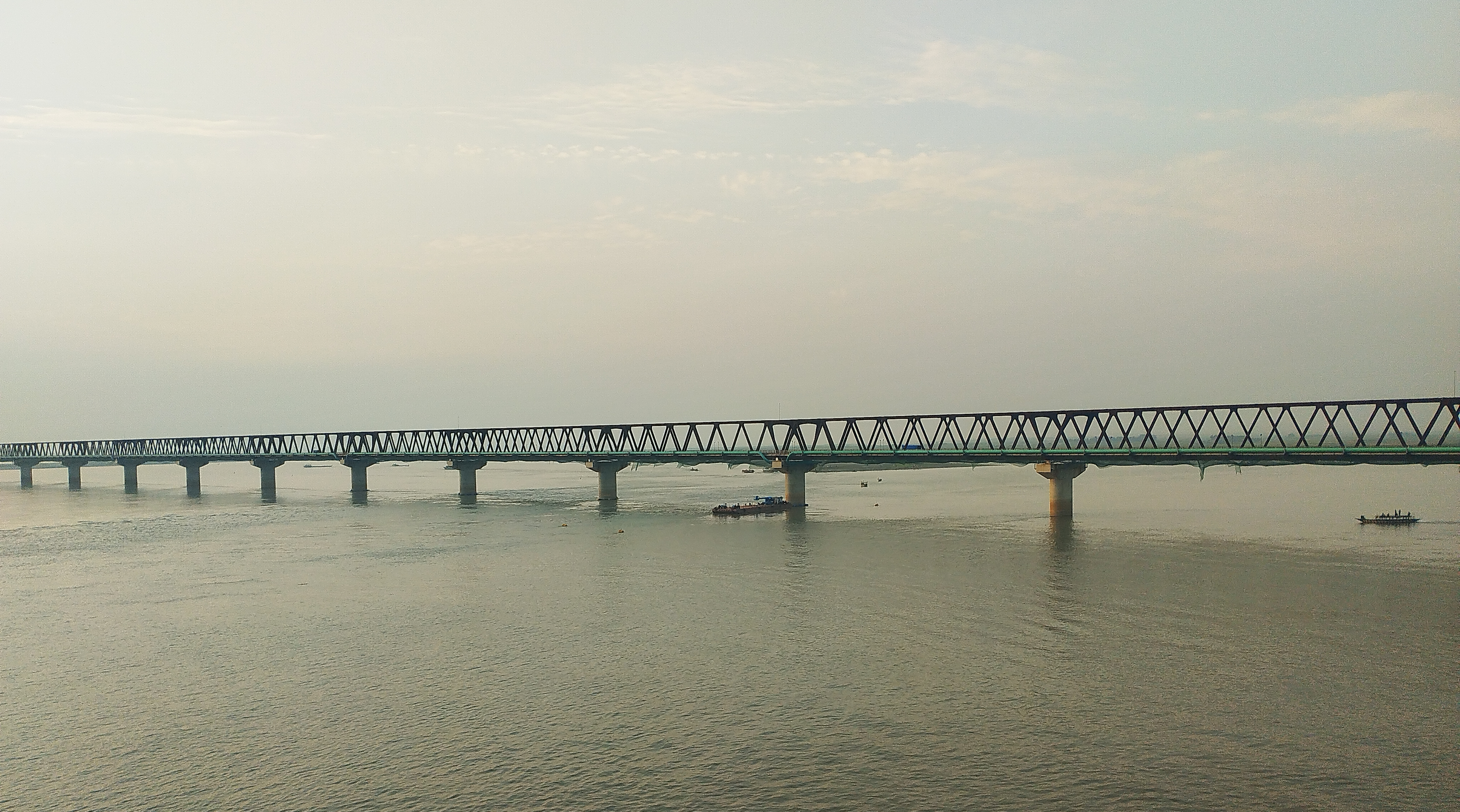
- Jamuna Railway Bridge
- Coordinates: 24.4026°N 89.7681°E
- Carries: Jamtoil–Joydebpur line Dual Gauge railway line
- Crosses: Jamuna River
- Locale: Sirajganj, & Tangail Bangladesh
- Official name: Jamuna Railway Bridge
- Other name: Jamuna Rail Bridge
- Owner: Bangladesh Railway
- Next upstream: Naranarayan Setu
- Next downstream: Jamuna Bridge

Characteristics
- Total length: 4.8 kilometres (3 mi)

Rail characteristics
- Track gauge: Dual Gauge

History
- Construction start: August 1, 2020
- Construction end: November 26, 2024
- Opened: March 18, 2025; 17 months ago

Location
- Interactive map of Jamuna Railway Bridge

The Jamuna Railway Bridge is a dual-gauge, double-track railway bridge on Jamuna River in Bangladesh. This bridge connects Sirajganj and Tangail by railway network. This bridge is the longest solo railway bridge in Bangladesh.

== History and Background ==
As of October 2020, approximately 44 trains crossed the Jamuna Bridge each day. However, the bridge had several operational limitations. Train speeds were restricted to 20 km/h, and the bridge carried only a single railway track, which limited the number of trains that could cross. In addition, heavy freight trains were unable to use the bridge because of weight restrictions.

The Jamuna Railway Bridge is expected to reduce travel time for trains operating between Dhaka and the northern and western regions of Bangladesh by about two hours. It is also intended to increase capacity for freight transport by rail, including traffic from neighboring countries to the northern regions.

The bridge will facilitate the movement of passengers and goods on domestic routes and is planned to serve as part of regional railway connectivity initiatives such as SAARC, BIMSTEC, SASEC, and the Trans-Asian Railway network. After the new bridge becomes operational, the railway tracks on the Jamuna Bridge are planned to be removed.

== Project details ==
First, on 6 December 2016, the Executive Committee of the National Economic Council (ECNEC) approved the construction project of the bridge. For this, the Bangladesh government undertook the project at a cost of Tk 9,734 crore, of which Japan's development cooperation organization Japan International Cooperation Agency (JICA) will provide Tk 7,724 crore. The project is scheduled to be implemented by December 2023.

However, in the next revised project, the deadline has been extended by two years to December 2025. At the same time, the project cost has been increased from Tk 9,734 crore to Tk 16,781 crore. JICA will provide loan assistance of 72% of the construction cost. Bangladesh Railway will implement the project. This project has been carried out by the Obayashi-Toa-JFE (OTJ) Joint Venture and IHI-SMCC Joint Venture for the eastern and western parts, respectively. Additionally, the project involves constructing a 7.6 km double-line railway approach embankment, 30.73 km of dual-gauge track, 16 viaducts, and renovating the East and West stations and yards of Jamuna Bridge. After completion, the bridge will increase the number of trains that can pass between the capital and the northwest by 88, significantly improving rail connectivity in the region. This bridge can accommodate broad-gauge trains traveling at 120km/h and meter-gauge trains moving at 100km/h.

Jamuna Rail Bridge is the largest and most vivid example of weathering steel (paintless steel) in Bangladesh. Use of this steel eliminates the need of any painting for corrosion protection. The seven year long atmospheric test was conducted by A F M Saiful Amin from Bangladesh University of Engineering and Technology through a joint project with JFe steel corporation Japan as a mark of solidarity and bilateral technology transfer between Japan and Bangladesh.

== Progress ==
The construction of the bridge has been fully completed in November 2024. A test run was initiated on 26 November, that completed the following day. The Jamuna Railway Bridge began trial operations on February 12, 2025, with passenger trains starting to cross the bridge. Initially, trains operated on a single track. The bridge was officially inaugurated on March 18, 2025, marking the start of full operations with both tracks in use.

== See also ==
- List of megaprojects in Bangladesh
- Bangladesh Railway
