= KFJ =

KFJ can refer to:

- Kishoreganj railway station, in Kishoreganj, Dhaka Division, Bangladesh
- Man Met language, Austroasiatic language spoken in Xinshuangbanna, Yunnan Province, China
- OK-Junior, kart racing class
