= Kishoreganj railway station =

Railway station in Kishoreganj District, Bangladesh

Kishoreganj কিশোরগঞ্জ

General information
- Location: Kishoreganj, Kishoreganj District, Dhaka Division; Bangladesh
- Coordinates: 24.426419°N 90.7886273°E
- Owner: Bangladesh Railway
- Line: Mymensingh–Gouripur–Bhairab line
- Platforms: 2

Construction
- Structure type: Standard (on ground station)
- Parking: Yes
- Cycle facilities: Yes
- Accessible: Yes

Other information
- Status: Opened
- Station code: KFJ
- Zone(s): East Zone
- Division(s): Dhaka

History
- Opened: 1914; 112 years ago

Services
Preceding station	Bangladesh Railway	Following station
Neelganj towards Mymensingh Junction	Mymensingh–Gouripur–Bhairab	Jashdalpur towards Bhairab Bazar Junction
Location

Kishoreganj railway station is a railway station in Kishoreganj. The station is located on Mymensingh–Gouripur–Bhairab line. The station code for this station is KFJ.
