= Turag Commuter =

Bangladeshi Local train

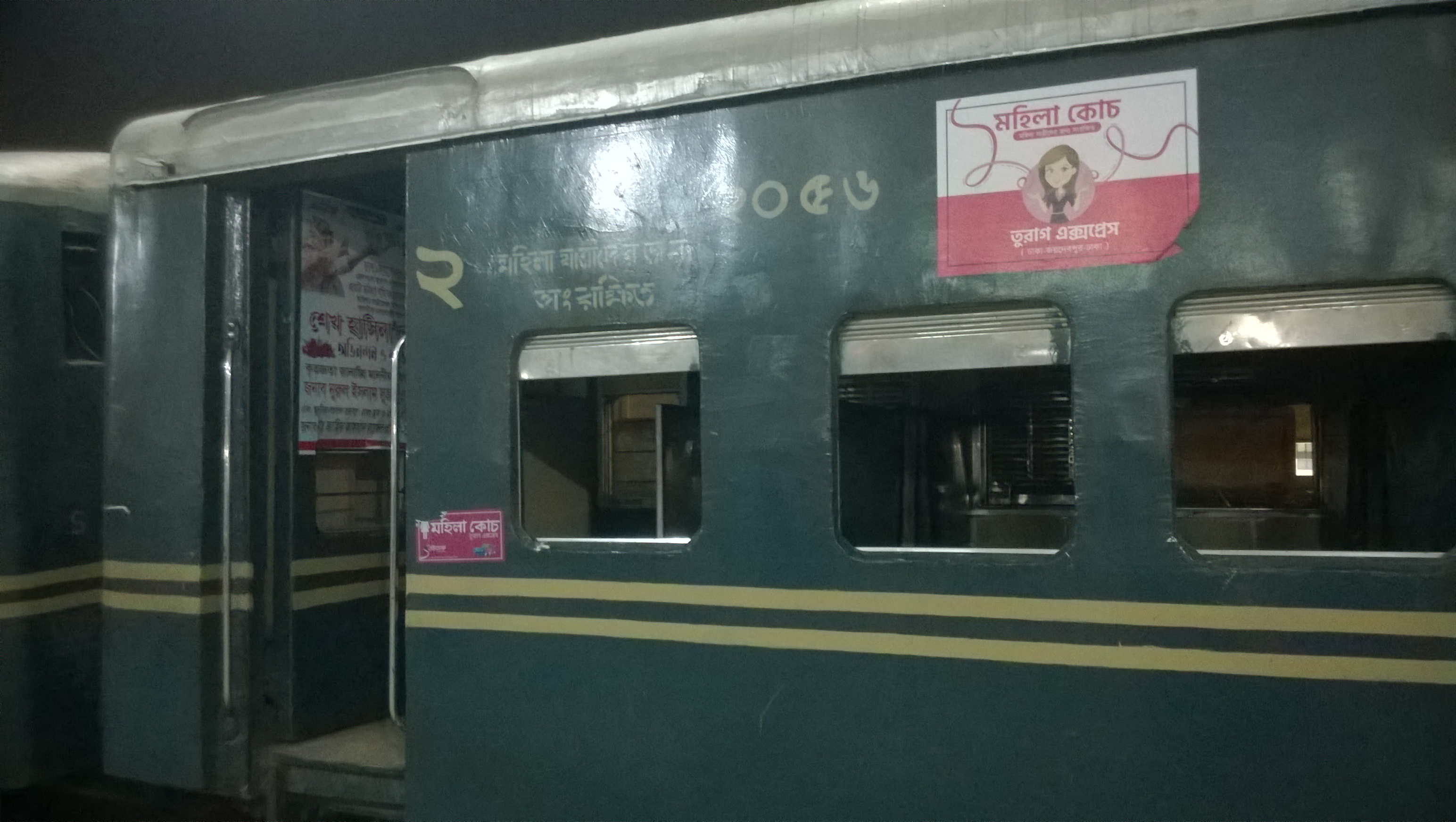

Overview
- Service type: Local
- Status: Operational
- First service: 20 June 2012
- Current operator: East Zons

Route
- Termini: Kamalapur railway station Joydebpur Junction railway station
- Stops: 6
- Average journey time: 80 mins
- Service frequency: 6 days per week (except friday)
- Train number: Turag Commuter 1–4
- Line used: Narayanganj–Bahadurabad Ghat line

On-board services
- Class: Shovon
- Seating arrangements: Available
- Sleeping arrangements: No
- Auto-rack arrangements: No
- Catering facilities: No
- Observation facilities: Yes
- Baggage facilities: Overhead rack
- Other facilities: Reserved women's coach

Technical
- Track gauge: 1,000 mm (3 ft 3 3/8 in)
- Track owner: Bangladesh Railway
- Rake maintenance: Dhaka

Turag Commuter, formerly Turag Express, is a local train in Bangladesh operated by Bangladesh Railway. It runs from Kamalapur in Dhaka to Joydebpur in Gazipur. Earlier this train used to run from Joydebpur station to Narayanganj in Narayanganj. The specialty of this train is that it has a reserved coach for women.

In 2012, authorities decided to add two more trains to the route.

The train was the most popular among passengers in 2014, as it takes less time to reach Dhaka from Gazipur than the N3 highway.

It was earlier an express train. It was converted into a commuter train on 21 October 2023 as decided by the authorities.

== Incidents ==
- On 5 February 2015, vandals set fire to two coaches of the Jaydebpur-bound train as it reached the station. One vandal was caught by the passengers while escaping from the train. No one was injured.
- On 1 March 2016, the Turag train arrived at Joydebpur station around 7:30 a.m. and stopped on Line No. 3. Meanwhile, the Dhaka-bound Hirtyan Express was waiting on Line No. 2. While switching tracks to change locomotives, the Turag train collided with the express. The impact derailed the rear coach, injuring at least five passengers. A child was killed on the tracks near the Turag locomotive.
- On 17 January 17 2024, the train derailed while going from Gazipur to Dhaka.
- On 23 May 2024, a coach of the train derailed in Dhirashram area while it was going to Dhaka. No casualties were reported.
