= Elliott Bridge, Sirajganj =

Bridge in Sirajganj, Bangladesh

Elliott Bridge ইলিয়ট সেতু
- Coordinates: 24°27′38.1″N 89°42′30″E
- Crosses: Boral (Katakhali) River
- Locale: Sirajganj
- Other name: Boropool
- Maintained by: Sirajganj Municipality

Characteristics
- Design: Arch bridge
- Material: Steel and Concrete
- Total length: 180 ft
- Width: 16 ft
- Height: 30 ft
- No. of spans: 1

History
- Architect: Stuart Hartland
- Constructed by: Hartland Company
- Construction start: 1892
- Construction end: 1895
- Construction cost: Tk 45,000

Elliott Bridge (locally known as Boropool) is an old bridge over the Boral River in Sirajganj, north-western Bangladesh. The pillarless bridge is named after Charles Alfred Elliott, a British Lieutenant Governor of Bengal Presidency. It cost 45,000 takas to make it. It is one of the major attractions of Sirajganj city.

== History ==
The river Boral or Katakhali, (Note: The river is recorded as "Boral River" and "Dhanbandhi River" in two different mouzas in the CS survey. When the river was re-excavated during the British rule, it became known as Katakhali. In some sources it is referred to as "Hura Sagar" or "Hurasagar River". Also in many sources it has been called canal.) which flows through the town named Sirajganj, divides the city into two parts, East and West. Due to its connection with the river Jamuna, the flow of water in this Katakhali was much higher. So in 1892, the then sub-divisional officer Bitson Bell, planned to build a bridge to solve the traffic problem between the two banks.

The Hartland Company built the bridge, designed by Stuart Hartland who was a British engineer. Charles Alfred Elliott, the then Lieutenant Governor of Bengal laid its foundation stone on 6 August 1892. The bridge, named Elliott Bridge, is named after him. The bridge has since been renovated several times.

== Funding ==
It cost Tk 45,000 to build the bridge at that time. Magistrate of Pabna District (Note: At that time Sirajganj was a subdivision of Pabna district.) Julius gave a grant of Tk 15,000 from the district board. The rest of the money was collected from donations from local zamindars and rich people.

== Architecture ==
It is an arch bridge without pillars. The entire structure of the 160 feet long and 18 feet wide bridge is made of steel. Above it was a wooden deck. As they were destroyed, concrete was used later.

The height of the bridge is 30 feet. The bridge was raised and built without pillars so as not to disrupt the movement of large cargo ships plying the Katakhali river. Apart from this, standing on the bridge so that the view of Sirajganj city could be seen was also another reason for building the bridge.

== Current status ==
The bridge is one of the sights of Sirajganj city. In 1962, the construction of the Sirajganj City Protection Dam on the Jamuna made the mouth of a sluice gate at the Baitara end of the Katakhali River and the other mouth closed. In 2019, the re-excavation of the river happened by Sirajganj Water Development Board. The river Jamuna was then connected to Baitara through a switch gate. As a result, water flows in the river and the bridge regains its beauty. Heavy vehicles are not allowed to cross the bridge to protect it.

== See also ==
- Hurasagar River
