= Tangail railway station =

Railway station in Tangail, Bangladesh

Tangail টাঙ্গাইল

General information
- Location: Rail Station Road, Tangail, Tangail District; Bangladesh
- Coordinates: 24.2738°N 89.9376°E
- System: Bangladesh Railway
- Line: Jamtoil–Joydebpur line
- Platforms: 2

Construction
- Structure type: Standard (on ground station)
- Parking: Yes
- Cycle facilities: Yes
- Accessible: Yes

Other information
- Status: Functioning

History
- Opened: 2003; 23 years ago

Services
| Preceding station | Bangladesh Railway | Following station |
|---|---|---|
| Bangabandhu Bridge East towards Jamtoil Junction | Jamtoil–Joydebpur | Karatia towards Joydebpur Junction |
Location

Tangail Railway Station is a station situated at 97 kilometres (60 mi) north-west of Dhaka, the capital of Bangladesh. It is the principal station of the city of Tangail.

== Trains ==
- Inter-city Trains
1. Tangail Commuter 1 (Dhaka-Bangabandhu Setu East-Dhaka)
2. Tangail Commuter 2 (Dhaka-Bangabandhu Setu East-Dhaka)
3. Silk City Express (Dhaka- Rajshahi - Dhaka)
4. Dhumketu Express (Dhaka- Rajshahi - Dhaka)
5. Padma Express (Dhaka- Rajshahi - Dhaka)
6. Drutajan Express (Dhaka- Dinajpur - Dhaka)
7. Ekota Express (Dhaka- Dinajpur - Dhaka)
8. Lalmoni Express (Dhaka- Lalmonirhat - Dhaka)
9. Sirajganj Express (Dhaka- Ishwardi - Dhaka)
10. Rangpur Express (Dhaka- Rangpur - Dhaka)
11. Sundarban Express (Dhaka- Khulna - Dhaka)
12. Chitra Express (Dhaka- Khulna - Dhaka)
13. Nilsagor Express (Dhaka- Nilphamari - Dhaka)
- Mail Trains
1. Rajshahi Mail (Dhaka- Chapai Nawabganj - Dhaka)
