= Jamalpur Town Junction railway station =

Railway station in Jamalpur District, Bangladesh

Jamalpur Town Junction জামালপুর টাউন জংশন
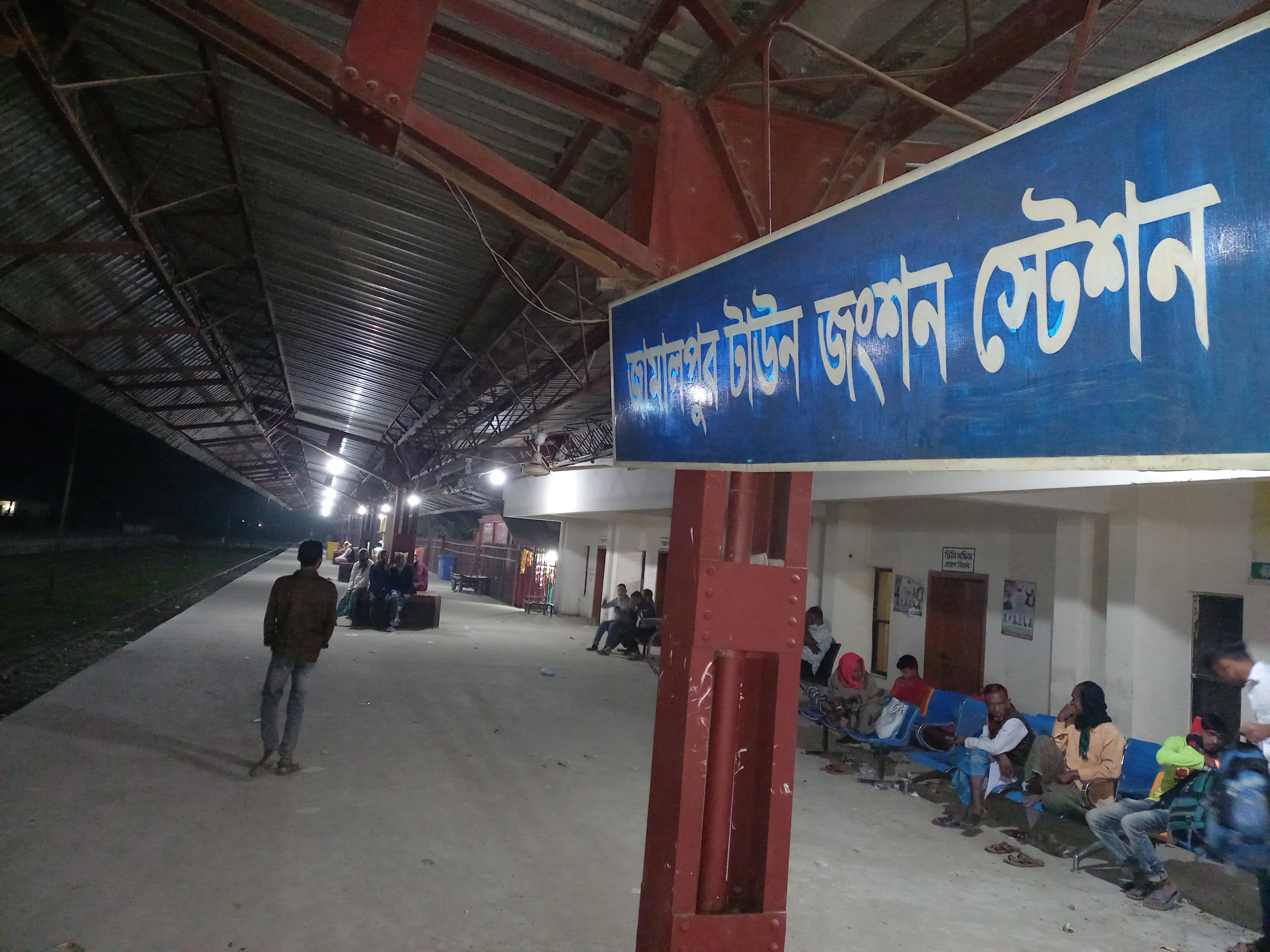
- Jamalpur Town Junction Railway Station

General information
- Location: Mymensingh; Bangladesh
- Coordinates: 24°54′55″N 89°57′14″E
- System: Passenger train station
- Owner: Bangladesh Railway
- Lines: Narayanganj–Bahadurabad Ghat line Jamalpur–Bangabandhu Bridge East line
- Platforms: 3
- Tracks: Metre Gauge

Construction
- Structure type: Standard (on ground station)

Other information
- Status: Functioning
- Station code: JLX
- Zone(s): East Zone
- Division(s): Dhaka

History
- Opened: November 3, 1894; 131 years ago
- Former names: Assam Bengal Railway (1886–1947); Pakistan Eastern Railway (1947–1971)

Services
Preceding station	Bangladesh Railway	Following station
Jamalpur Court	Line; Narayanganj–Bahadurabad Ghat line	Nandina
Kendua Bazar	Line; Jamalpur -Bangabandhu Bridge East	Terminus
Location

Jamalpur Town Junction Railway Station is a junction railway located on Narayanganj–Bahadurabad Ghat line and Jamalpur-Bangabandhu Bridge East line. The station located in Jamalpur. The station opened on 3 November 1894.
