= Netrokona railway station =

Railway station in Netrokona District, Bangladesh

Netrokona নেত্রকোণা

General information
- Location: Netrokona, Netrokona District, Mymensingh Division; Bangladesh
- Coordinates: 24.8888°N 90.7207°E
- Owner: Bangladesh Railway
- Line: Gouripur-Mohanganj Branch Line
- Platforms: 2
- Tracks: 3

Construction
- Structure type: Standard (on ground station)
- Parking: Yes
- Cycle facilities: Yes
- Accessible: Yes

Other information
- Status: Opened
- Station code: NRQ
- Zone(s): East Zone
- Division(s): Dhaka

History
- Opened: 1918; 108 years ago

Services
Preceding station	Bangladesh Railway	Following station
Collishanagar	Line; Gouripur-Mohanganj Branch Line	Netrokona Court
Location

Netrokona railway station is a railway station located in Netrokona. The station is located on Mymensingh–Gouripur–Bhairab line. The station is also called Netrokona bara railway station [Netrokona main railway station].
