= Chattogram University railway station =

Railway station in Chittagong District, Bangladesh

Chittagong University চট্টগ্রাম বিশ্ববিদ্যালয়
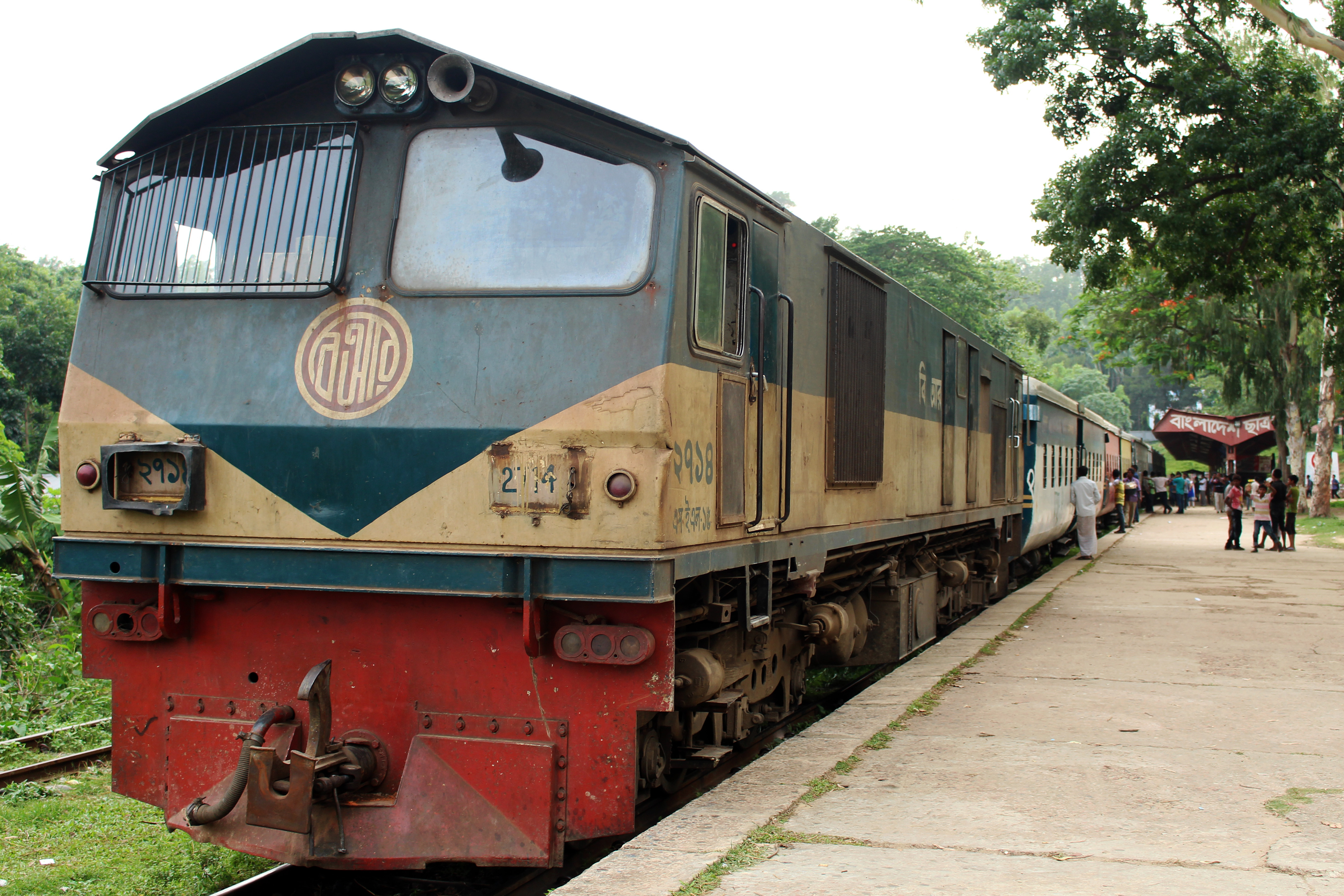
- Chittagong University Railway Station

General information
- Location: University of Chittagong, Hathazari, Chittagong; Bangladesh
- Coordinates: 22°18′13.81″N 91°47′37.58″E
- Owner: University of Chittagong
- Operator: Bangladesh Railway
- Line: 2
- Distance: 22 km
- Platforms: 1
- Tracks: 2

History
- Opened: 1973

Passengers
- 30000+
Location

Chittagong University Railway Station (Bengali: চট্টগ্রাম বিশ্ববিদ্যালয় রেলওয়ে স্টেশন) is situated next to Shahid Amoo Road in Hathazari, Chittagong, Bangladesh. It was built to facilitate student access to the Chittagong University campus. The station has one platform, which is currently the only one in service.

== University Shuttle Train ==
The Chittagong University Shuttle Train is the only running shuttle service made specifically for a university in the world. This train is operated by the Eastern Division of the Bangladesh Railway and monitored by the university administration. Everyday, thousands of students commute to and from the university using this service. As per the new schedule, Chittagong University-bound trains will leave Chattogram railway station at 7:30am, 8:00am, 3:50pm, 5:30pm, and 8:30pm while they will leave from Sholoshohor railway station at 9:45am and 10:30am. Besides, city-bound trains will leave Chittagong University railway station at 8:45am, 9:20am, 2:30pm, 3:30pm, 5:00pm, 6:00pm and 9.30pm.

== Gallery ==
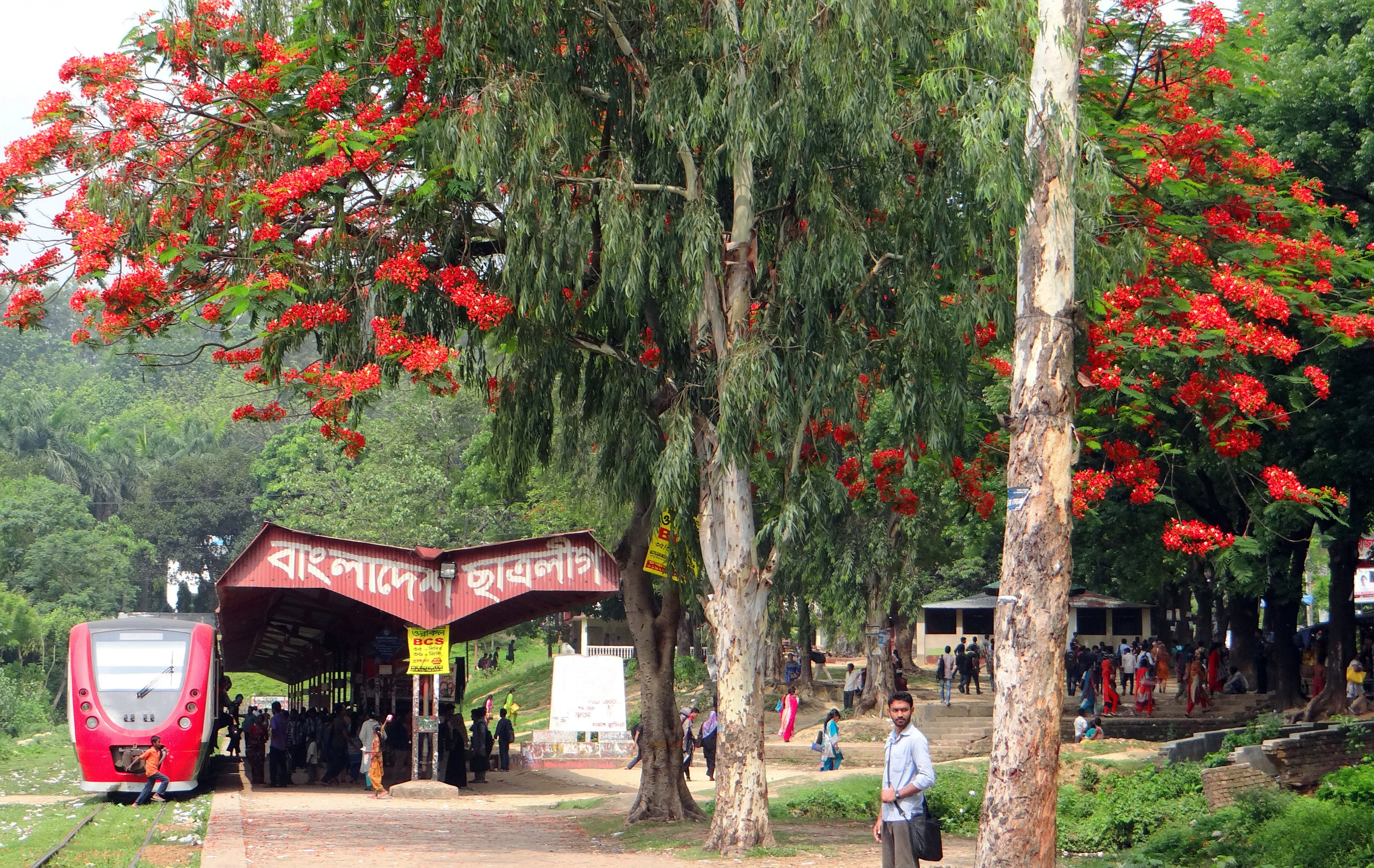
Railway station platform

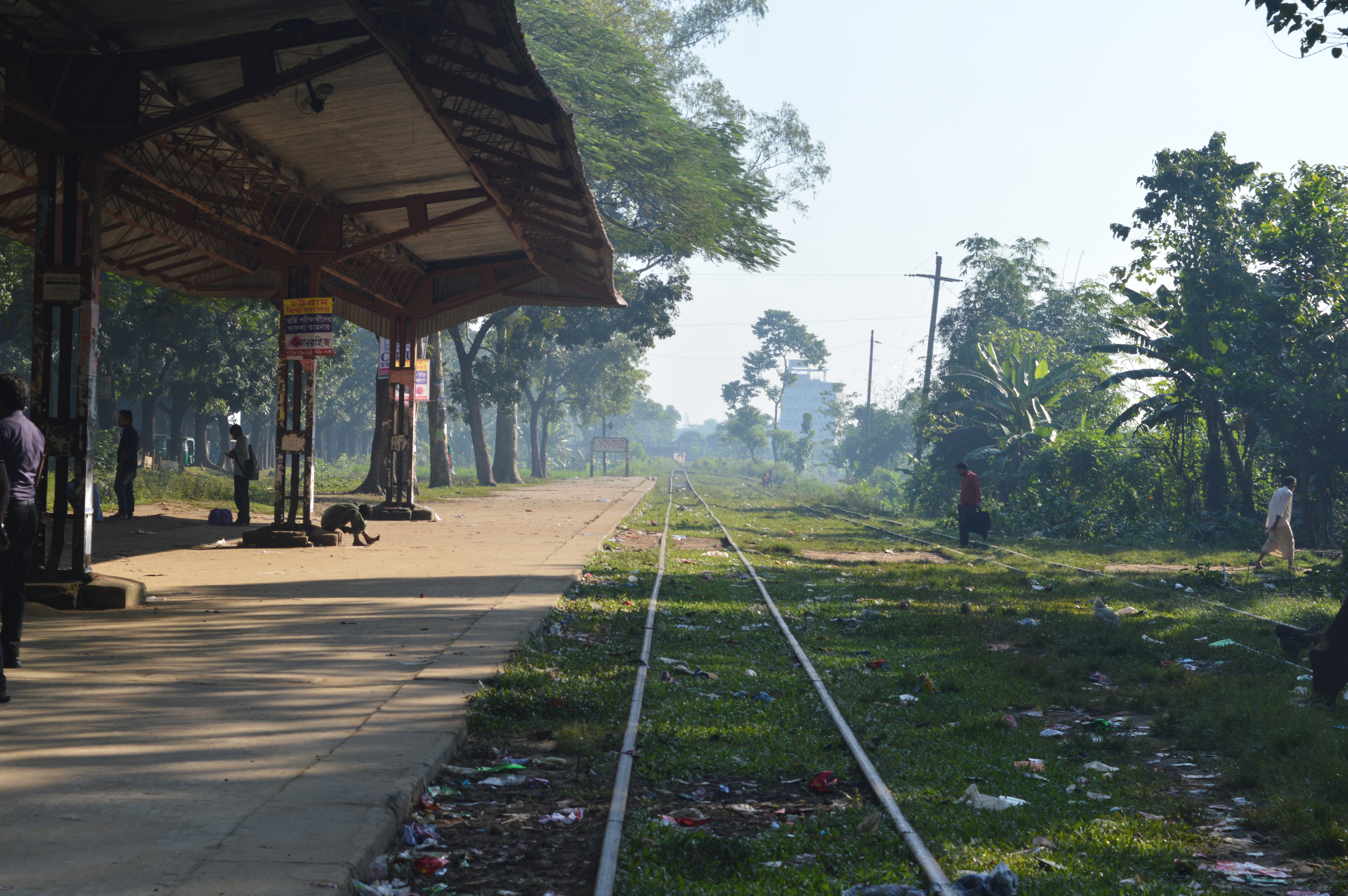
Railway station area

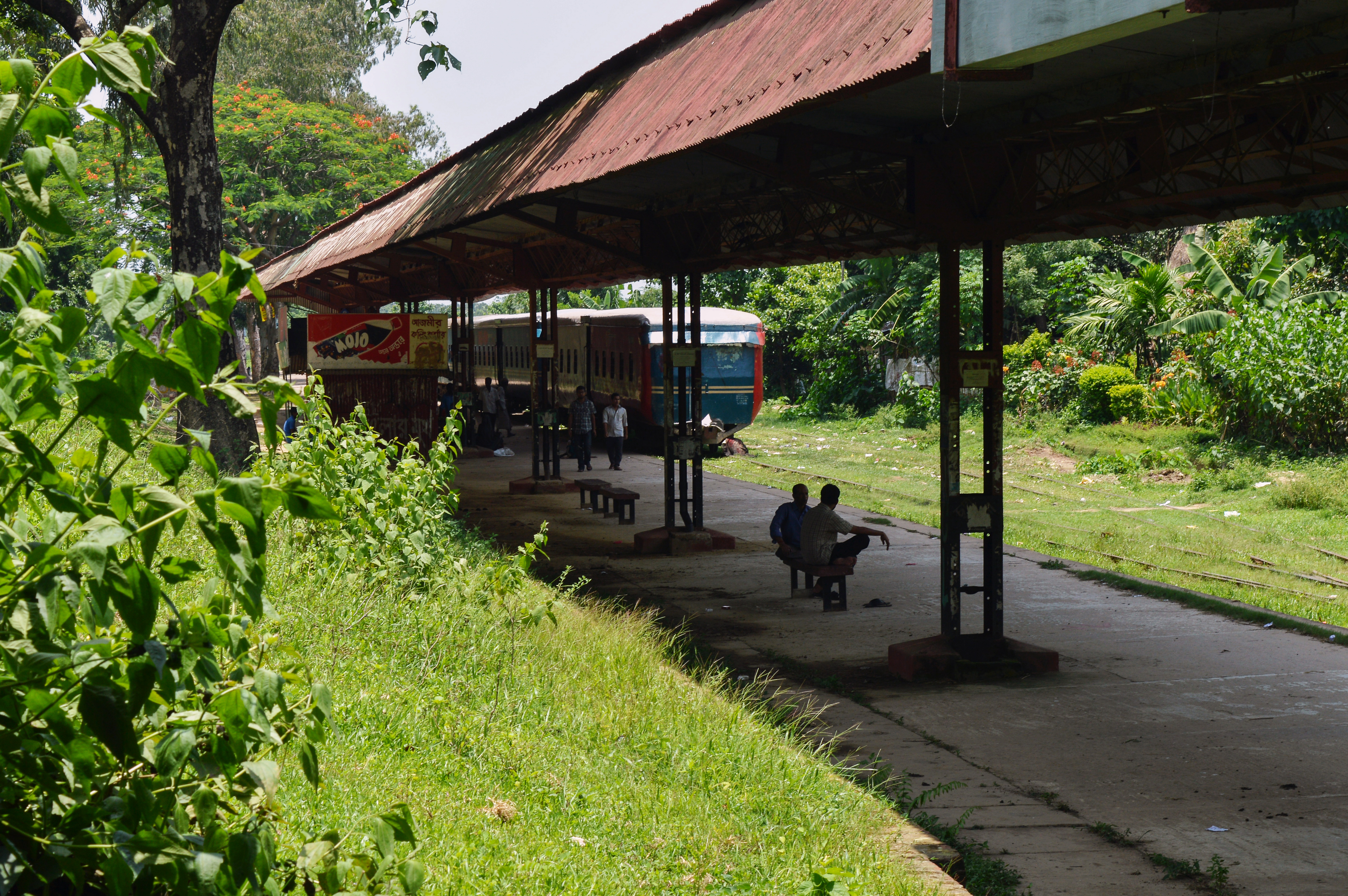
DEMU Train at Chittagong University Railway Station

== See also ==
- University of Chittagong
- List of railway stations in Bangladesh
