= Ishwardi Junction railway station =

Railway station in Pabna, Bangladesh

Ishwardi Junction ঈশ্বরদী জংশন
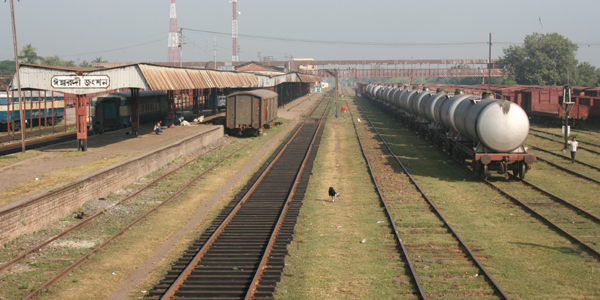
- Ishwardi Junction railway station

General information
- Location: Ishwardi, Pabna, Rajshahi; Bangladesh
- Coordinates: 24°07′46″N 89°03′46″E
- Elevation: 29 m (95 ft)
- Lines: Chilahati-Parbatipur-Santahar-Darshana line Ishwardi-Sirajganj line
- Platforms: 6
- Tracks: 20

Construction
- Structure type: Standard (on ground station)
- Parking: Yes
- Cycle facilities: Yes
- Accessible: Yes

Other information
- Status: Functioning
- Station code: ISD

History
- Former names: Eastern Bengal Railway

Services
Preceding station	Bangladesh Railway	Following station
Azimnagar	Line; Chilahati-Parbatipur-Santahar-Darshana Line	Paksey
Terminus	Line; Ishwardi–Sirajganj line	Majhgram Junction
Terminus	Line; Ishwardi-Ruppur Branch Line	Rooppur
Location

Ishwardi Junction railway station is a railway station in Bangladesh, situated at Ishwardi in the district of Pabna, in the division of Rajshahi. It is one of major Junction in West Zone of Bangladesh Railway.

== History ==
From 1878, the railway route from Kolkata, then called Calcutta, to Siliguri was in two laps. The first lap was a 185 km journey along the Eastern Bengal State Railway from Calcutta Station (later renamed Sealdah) to Damookdeah Ghat on the southern bank of the Padma River, then across the river in a ferry and the second lap of the journey. A 336 km metre gauge line of the North Bengal Railway linked Saraghat on the northern bank of the Padma to Siliguri. It was during this period that Iswardi came up as a railway station.

The Kolkata-Siliguri main line was converted to broad gauge in stages. The Shakole-Santahar section was converted in 1910–1914, when Hardinge Bridge was under construction. The Hardinge Bridge was opened in 1915.

The Sara-Sirajganj line was constructed by the Sara-Sirajganj Railway Company in 1915–1916. Consequent to the construction of the 4.8 kilometres (3.0 mi) long Bangabandhu Bridge in 1998, there was reassessment of the requirements of the railways. First, a 99 kilometres (62 mi) long new dual gauge line was to be constructed from Joydebpur to Jamtoil, to connect the eastern part of the Bangladesh railway system to the western part. The problem of two different gauges in two different parts of the country was solved by introducing dual gauge. Second, a 245 kilometres (152 mi) length of broad gauge track from Jamtoil to Parbatpur was similarly to be converted to dual gauge.
