= Islamia Government College =

Government owned college in Sirajganj, Bangladesh

Coordinates: 24.4613°N 89.7124°E

- ইসলামিয়া সরকারি কলেজ
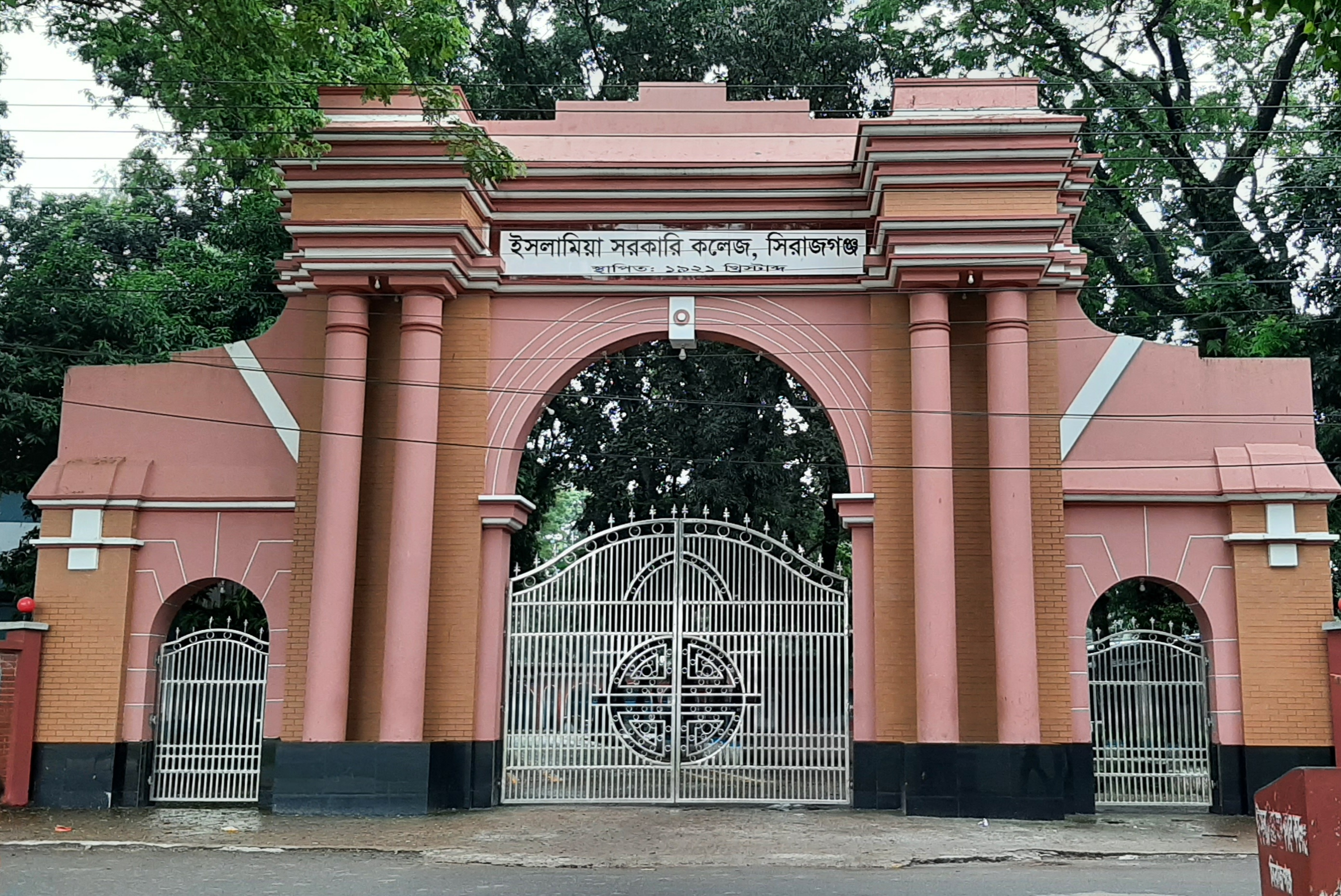
- Established: 1921
- Affiliations: Board of Intermediate and Secondary Education, Rajshahi
- Students: 1000+
- Location: J C Road, Sirajganj, Sirajganj, Bangladesh

Islamia Government College (Bengali: ইসলামিয়া সরকারি কলেজ) is a government owned college in Sirajganj, Bangladesh. It is among the oldest colleges in Bangladesh, and the oldest in Sirajganj District, established in 1921. The college is affiliated with National University.

== History ==
The institution began as a senior madrassa in 1892 before being converted into a high madrassa in 1916. It became Islamic Intermediate College in 1921, serving students from class I through XII. The secondary section was split off in 1966 as Sirajganj Islamia College, and offered an Intermediate of Arts diploma at the time. Bachelor's degrees were introduced in 1972. It was nationalized in 1986.

== Departments ==
=== Higher Secondary ===
The college offers higher secondary courses according to the curriculum of National Curriculum and Textbook Board in three different disciplines. After two years of course, Higher Secondary Certificate examination is held under Rajshahi Education Board.

Enrollment every year
| Group | # |
|---|---|
| Science | 250 |
| Business Studies | 250 |
| Humanities | 250 |

=== Undergraduate and Graduate program ===
Undergraduate (Honours) and postgraduate (Masters) programs are running in 16 departments.

Faculty of Science

- Physics
- Chemistry
- Mathematics
- Zoology
- Botany
- Geography and Environment

Faculty of Arts

- English
- Bengali
- History
- Islamic History and Culture
- Philosophy

Faculty of Social Science

- Political Science
- Economics

Faculty of Business Studies

- Accounting
- Finance
- Management

== Facilities ==
=== Laboratory ===
- Physics Lab
- Chemistry Lab
- Zoology Lab
- Computer Lab

=== Academic buildings ===
- Science building
- Arts building
- Business Studies building
- Administrative building
- Physical Education building

=== Others ===
Islamia government College Library has a collection of around 10,000 books.

- Library
- Mosque
- Central Playground
- Pond
- Flower garden
- Shaheed Minar
- Teacher's residence
- Students hall
