= Mymensingh Junction railway station =

Railway station in Mymensingh, Bangladesh

Mymensingh Junction ময়মনসিংহ জংশন
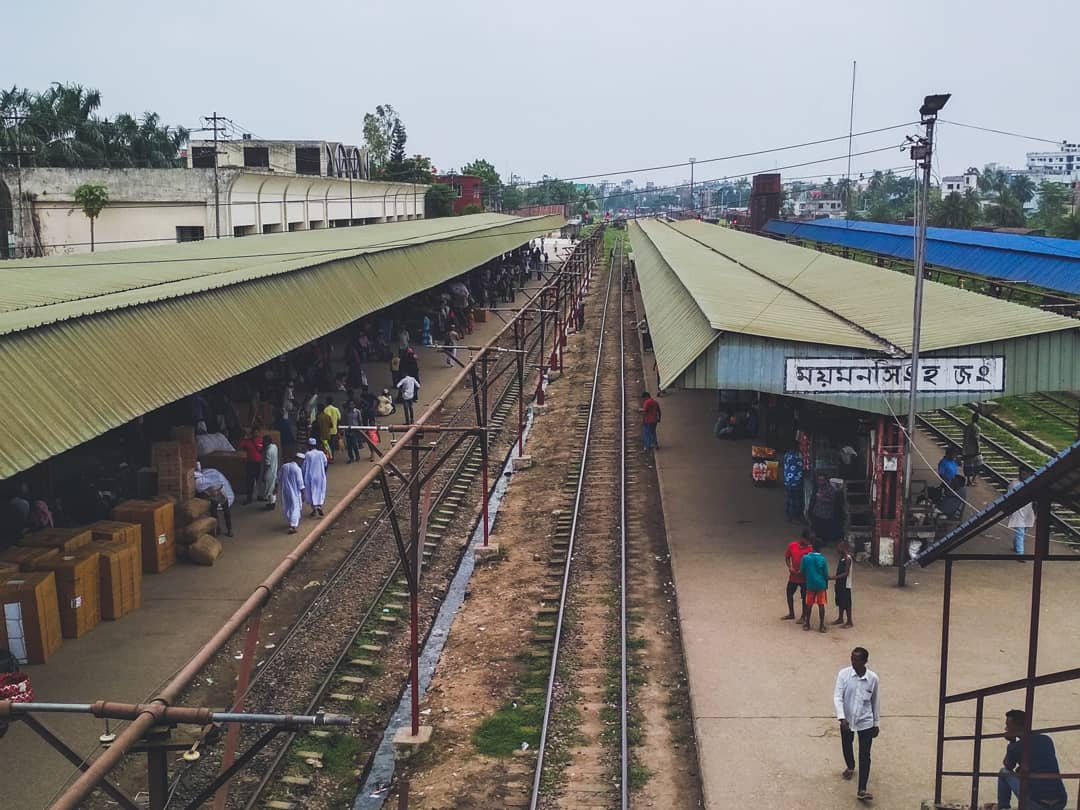

General information
- Location: Mymensingh; Bangladesh
- Coordinates: 24°45′12″N 90°24′37″E
- System: Passenger train station
- Owner: Bangladesh Railway
- Lines: Narayanganj–Bahadurabad Ghat line Mymensingh–Gouripur–Bhairab line
- Platforms: 3
- Tracks: Meter Gauge

Construction
- Structure type: Standard (on ground station)

Other information
- Status: Functioning
- Station code: MYN
- Zone(s): East Zone
- Division(s): Dhaka

History
- Opened: 15 February 1886
- Former names: Assam Bengal Railway (1886–1947); Pakistan Eastern Railway (1947–1971)

Services
Preceding station	Bangladesh Railway	Following station
Agriculture University towards Narayanganj	Narayanganj–Bahadurabad Ghat	Mymensingh Road towards Bahadurabad Ghat
Terminus	Mymensingh–Gouripur–Bhairab	Shambhuganj towards Bhairab Bazar Junction
Location

Mymensingh Junction Railway Station is a railway junction located in Mymensingh, Bangladesh.

== History ==
The demand for jute was increasing all over the world. For the purpose of meeting that growing demand, there was a need for better communication system than the existing communication system to supply jute from Eastern Bengal to Port of Kolkata. Therefore in 1885 a 144 km wide meter gauge railway line named Dhaka State Railway was constructed to bring raw jute to Kolkata mainly by river which connects Mymensingh with Narayanganj. The railway junction in Mymensingh opened on 15 February 1886. In 2021, the Minister of Railways announced the modernization of the railway junction at a cost of ৳200 crore.

== Criticisms ==
Mymensingh Junction railway station is known to be unsanitary and a hotbed of pickpockets. The station is also allegedly occupied by ticket black marketers.
