= Nilphamari railway station =

Railway station in Nilphamari District, Bangladesh

Nilphamari নীলফামারী

General information
- Location: Nilphamari, Nilphamari District, Rangpur Division; Bangladesh
- Coordinates: 25.95266°N 88.83524°E
- Owner: Bangladesh Railway
- Line: Chilahati–Parbatipur–Santahar–Darshana line
- Platforms: 1
- Tracks: 2

Construction
- Structure type: Standard (on ground station)
- Parking: Yes
- Cycle facilities: Yes
- Accessible: Yes

Other information
- Status: Opened
- Station code: NIL
- Zone(s): West Zone
- Division(s): Pakshi

History
- Opened: 1878; 148 years ago

Services
Preceding station	Bangladesh Railway	Following station
Toronbari towards Chilahati	Chilahati–Parbatipur–Santahar–Darshana	Nilphamari College towards Darshana
Location

Nilphamari railway station is a railway station located in Nilphamari. This is one of the main station in Nilphamari District.

== History ==
During the British period all connections from southern parts of Bengal to North Bengal were through the eastern part of Bengal. From 1878, the railway route from Kolkata, then called Calcutta, was in two laps. The first lap was a 185 km journey along the Eastern Bengal State Railway from Calcutta Station (later renamed Sealdah) to Damookdeah Ghat on the southern bank of the Padma River, then across the river in a ferry and the second lap of the journey. A 336 km metre gauge line of the North Bengal Railway linked Saraghat on the northern bank of the Padma to Siliguri.

The 1.8 km long Hardinge Bridge across the Padma came up in 1912. In 1926 the metre-gauge section north of the bridge was converted to broad gauge, and so the entire Calcutta - Siliguri route became broad-gauge. The route thus ran: Sealdah-Ranaghat-Bheramara-Hardinge Bridge-Iswardi-Santahar-Hili-Parabtipur-Nilphamari-Haldibari-Jalpaiguri-Siliguri.

As of 2010, the 64 kilometres (40 mi) long Saidpur-Chilahati line was in such a bad shape that there was no fast train between Dhaka and Chilahati. In 2010, Taka 103.68 crore was sanctioned for the development of this line.
