= Gafargaon railway station =

Railway station in Mymensingh District, Bangladesh

Gafargaon গফরগাঁও
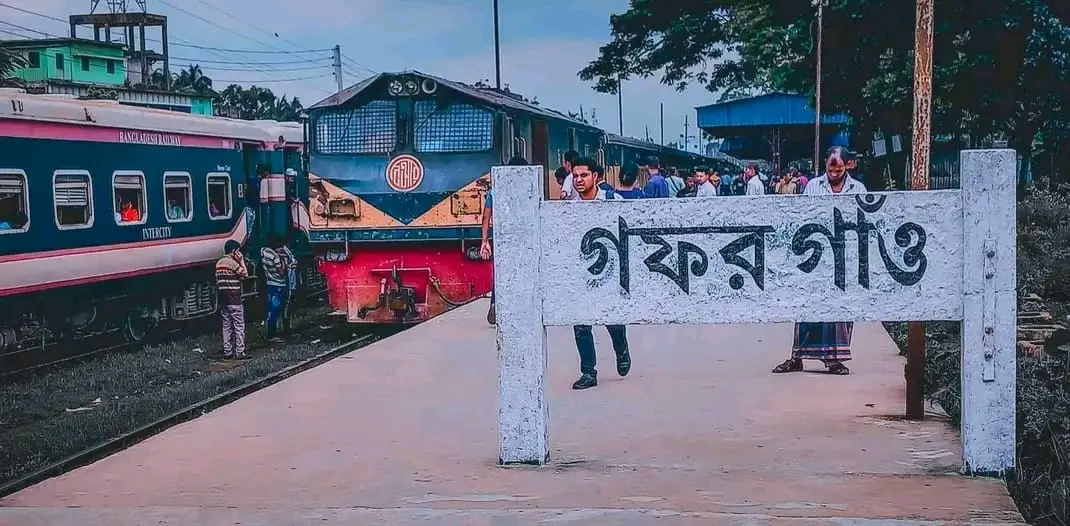
- Gafargaon railway station in 2024

General information
- Location: Gafargaon Upazila, Mymensingh District, Mymensingh Division; BAN
- Coordinates: 24.4536°N 90.5479°E
- System: Passenger train station
- Owner: Bangladesh Railway
- Operator: Bangladesh Railway
- Line: Narayanganj–Bahadurabad Ghat line
- Platforms: 1
- Tracks: Dual Gauge
- Train operators: East Zone

Construction
- Structure type: Standard (on ground station)
- Parking: No

History
- Opened: 1886
Location

Gafargaon Railway Station is a railway station located in Gafargaon Upazila of Mymensingh District, Mymensingh Division, Bangladesh.

== History ==
It was opened in 1886. A total of 12 trains, including 5 local trains, stop at Gafargaon station.

== Train service ==
The list of trains that pass through Gafargaon Railway Station is given below:

- Tista Express
- Jamalpur Express
- Agniveena Express
- Mohanganj Express
- Jamuna Express
- Brahmaputra Express and Haor Express
