= Kurigram railway station =

Railway station in Rangpur District, Bangladesh

Kurigram কুড়িগ্রাম
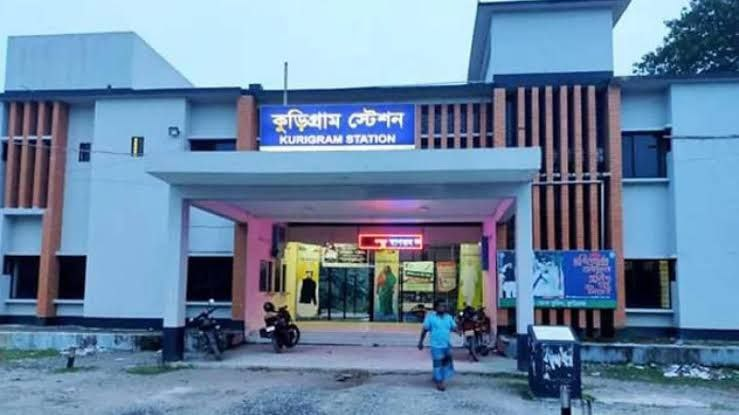

General information
- Location: Kurigram, Kurigram District, Rangpur Division; Bangladesh
- Coordinates: 25°48′27″N 89°37′17″E
- Line: Burimari–Lalmonirhat–Parbatipur line
- Platforms: 1

Construction
- Structure type: Standard (on ground station)
- Parking: Yes
- Cycle facilities: Yes
- Accessible: Yes

Other information
- Status: Functioning
- Station code: KRM
- Zone(s): West Zone
- Division(s): Lalmonirhat

History
- Opened: 1967; 59 years ago
- Former names: North Bengal Railway

Services
| Preceding station | Bangladesh Railway | Following station |
|---|---|---|
| Rajarhat | Line; Burimari–Lalmonirhat–Parbatipur line | Old Kurigram |
| Terminus | Line; Burimari–Lalmonirhat–Parbatipur line | Panchpir |
Route map
Location

Kurigram Railway Station (Bengali: কুড়িগ্রাম রেলওয়ে স্টেশন) is a railway station located in Kurigram district of Rangpur division of Bangladesh. It was built in 1879 as a Narrow gauge railway station.

== History ==
In 1967 the station station built as an alternative station to Old Kurigram station, as when the Kurigram- Chilmari line was built the Old Kurigram railway station become isolated.
