= Ishwardi–Sirajganj line =

Railway line in Bangladesh

Overview
- Status: Operational
- Owner: Bangladesh Railway
- Locale: Bangladesh
- Termini: Iswardi; Sirajganj
- Stations: 29

History
- Opened: 1878

Technical
- Track gauge: Dual gauge 1,676 mm (5 ft 6 in) 1,000 mm (3 ft 3 3/8 in)

The Ishwardi–Sirajganj Line is a dual gauge railway line connecting Iswardi and Sirajganj in Bangladesh. This track is under the jurisdiction of Bangladesh Railway.

== History ==
Sara-Sirajganj Railway Company constructed the Sara–Sirajganj line in 1915–1916.

== Ferry ==
In Bangladesh, ferries are often an integrated part of the railway system. There were two major ferry points across the Jamuna, one between Bahadurabad Ghat and Tistamukh Ghat and the other between Jagannathganj Ghat and Sirajganj Ghat.

The ferry system had reached the limits of its capacity. While marginal capacity additions were still feasible, to cope with any significant increase in capacity or even normal traffic growth was virtually felt to be impossible.

The construction of the 4.8 kilometres (3.0 mi) long Bangabandhu Bridge has completely changed the scope of communication systems in that part of the country. The ferry system at both the Bahadurabad Ghat-Balashi Ghat and the Jagannathganj Ghat-Sirajganj Ghat was virtually closed. Only limited freight transportation continued on the Bahadurabad Ghat-Balashi section. Even that has been closed down in 2010 because of formation of shoal in the river.
