= Magura railway station =

Railway station in Magura, Bangladesh

Magura মাগুরা

General information
- Location: Magura, Magura District, Khulna Division; Bangladesh
- Coordinates: 23.491167°N 89.431306°E
- Owner: Bangladesh Railway
- Line: Kalukhali-Gobra line
- Platforms: 2
- Tracks: 4

Construction
- Structure type: Standard (on ground station)
- Parking: Yes
- Cycle facilities: Yes
- Accessible: Yes

Other information
- Status: Under- construction
- Station code: MGRA
- Zone(s): West Zone
- Division(s): Pakshi

History
- Opening: Late 2025

Services
Preceding station	Bangladesh Railway	Following station
Kamarkhali Ghat	Line; Modhukhali- Magura	Terminus
Location

Magura railway station is a railway station under construction at Magura in Magura District. This railway station located on a branch line of Kalukhali-Gobra line.

== History ==
In 2018, the government approved the construction of the 20 km long Madhukhali - Magura railway line. The following year in Thakurbari of Magura area, then Minister of Railways Md. Nurul Islam Sujon integrated the building of compound of Magura railway station.
