= Mymensingh–Gouripur–Bhairab line =

Metre Gauge Railway line in Bangladesh

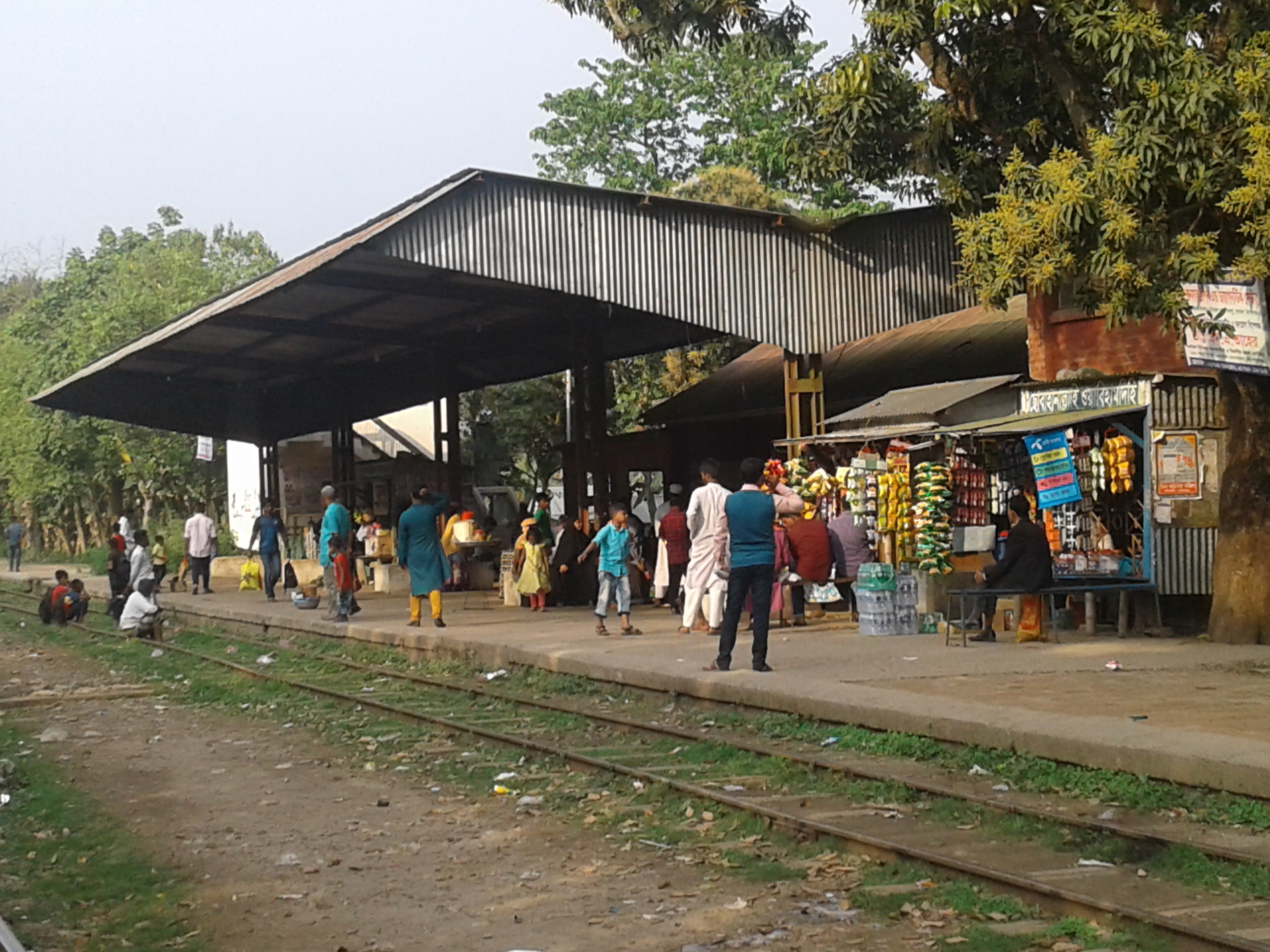
- A railway station of the line

Overview
- Status: Operational
- Owner: Bangladesh Railway
- Locale: Bangladesh
- Termini: Mymensingh Junction railway station; Bhairab Bazar railway station
- Stations: 21

Service
- Type: Railway line
- Operator(s): East Zone

History
- Opened: 1918

Technical
- Track gauge: Metre-gauge; 1,000 mm (3 ft 3 3/8 in)

Mymensingh–Gouripur–Bhairab line is a meter gauge railway line in Bangladesh which is operated and maintained under Bangladesh Railway.

== History ==
In 1912, the construction of the railway line was started and it took six years to complete its construction. After the partition of India, ownership of the railway line was transferred to the government of Pakistan, before that it was operated by Assam Bengal Railway. 14 passenger trains run regularly on this railway. Due to lack of maintenance for a long time, this line has become a dangerous railway. At present many stations of this railway line are closed.

== Branch lines ==
This railway line has two branches. A branch goes from Gouripur to Mohanganj via Shyamganj. Another branch goes to Jaria Jhanjail via Shyamganj Junction.
