= Rooppur railway station =

Railway station in Bangladesh

Rooppur রূপপুর
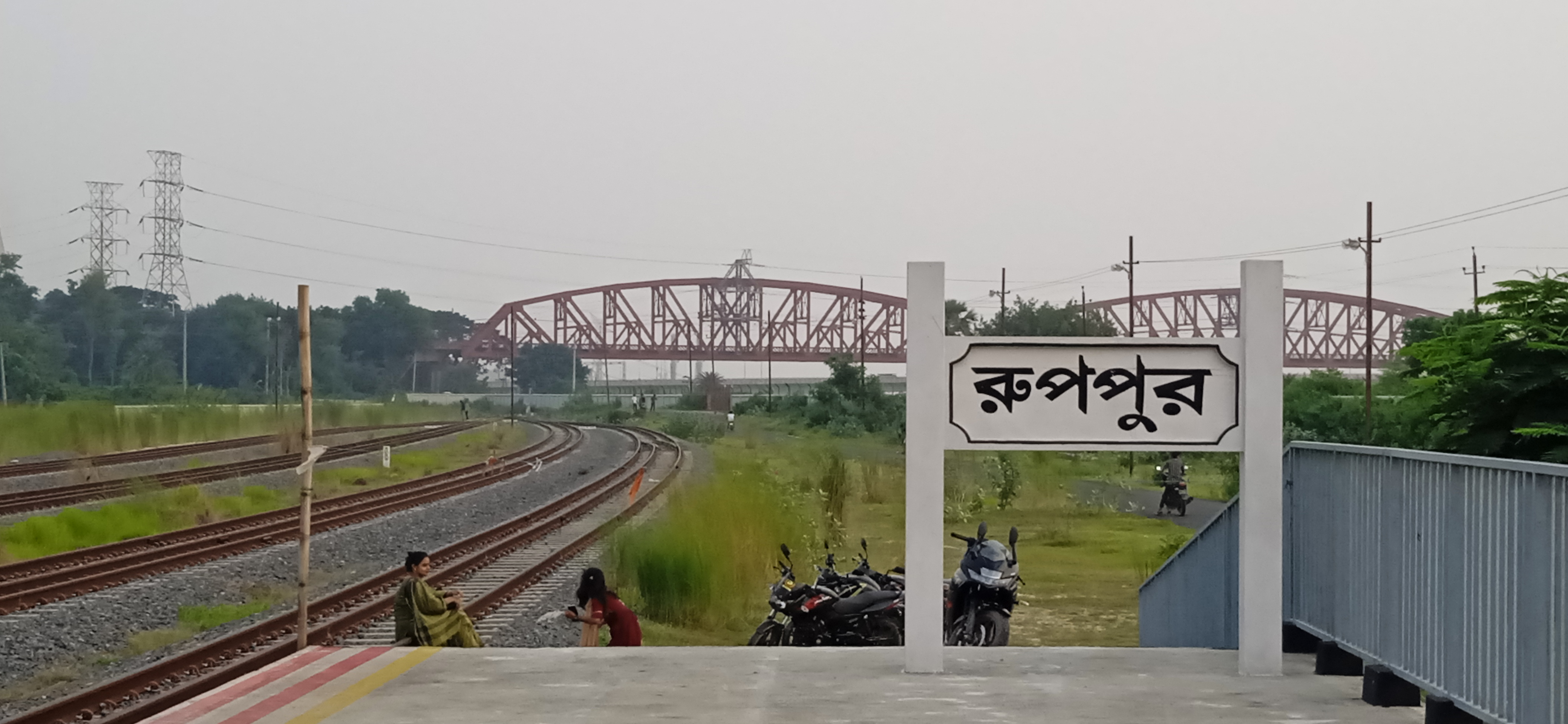

General information
- Location: Rooppur, Ishwardi Upazila, Pabna District; Bangladesh
- Coordinates: 24.074909°N 89.0390146°E
- Owner: Bangladesh Railway
- Line: Ishwardi–Rooppur line
- Tracks: Dual Gauge

Construction
- Structure type: Standard (on ground station)

Other information
- Status: Constructing
- Station code: RPPUR
- Zone(s): West Zone
- Division(s): Paksey

History
- Opened: 9 February 2023

Services
Preceding station	Bangladesh Railway	Following station
Ishwardi Junction	Line; Ishwardi-Ruppur Branch Line	Terminus
Route map
Location

Rooppur Railway Station is a railway station on the Ishwardi–Rooppur branch of Chilahati–Parbatipur–Santahar–Darshana line located in Ishwardi Upazila, Pabna District, Bangladesh.

== History ==
In 2018, it was planned to construct a railway station at Rooppur to transport its components and cargo to Rooppur Nuclear Power Plant. The planned branch line from Ishwardi Bypass railway station to Rooppur was planned to rehabilitate the existing 17.52 km track and construct 9 km dual-gauge track. The deadline for completion of this ৳335.97 crore railway line construction project was 2020. The construction of Rooppur railway station and its track started in April of the same year but could not be completed on time due to the COVID-19 pandemic. Later, the deadline was pushed back to 2022. Prime Minister Sheikh Hasina inaugurated this B-grade railway station on 9 February 2023.

== See also ==
- Bangladesh Railway
- Kamalapur railway station
- Khulna railway station
