= Joydebpur Junction railway station =

Railway station in Dhaka, Bangladesh

Joydebpur Junction জয়দেবপুর জংশন
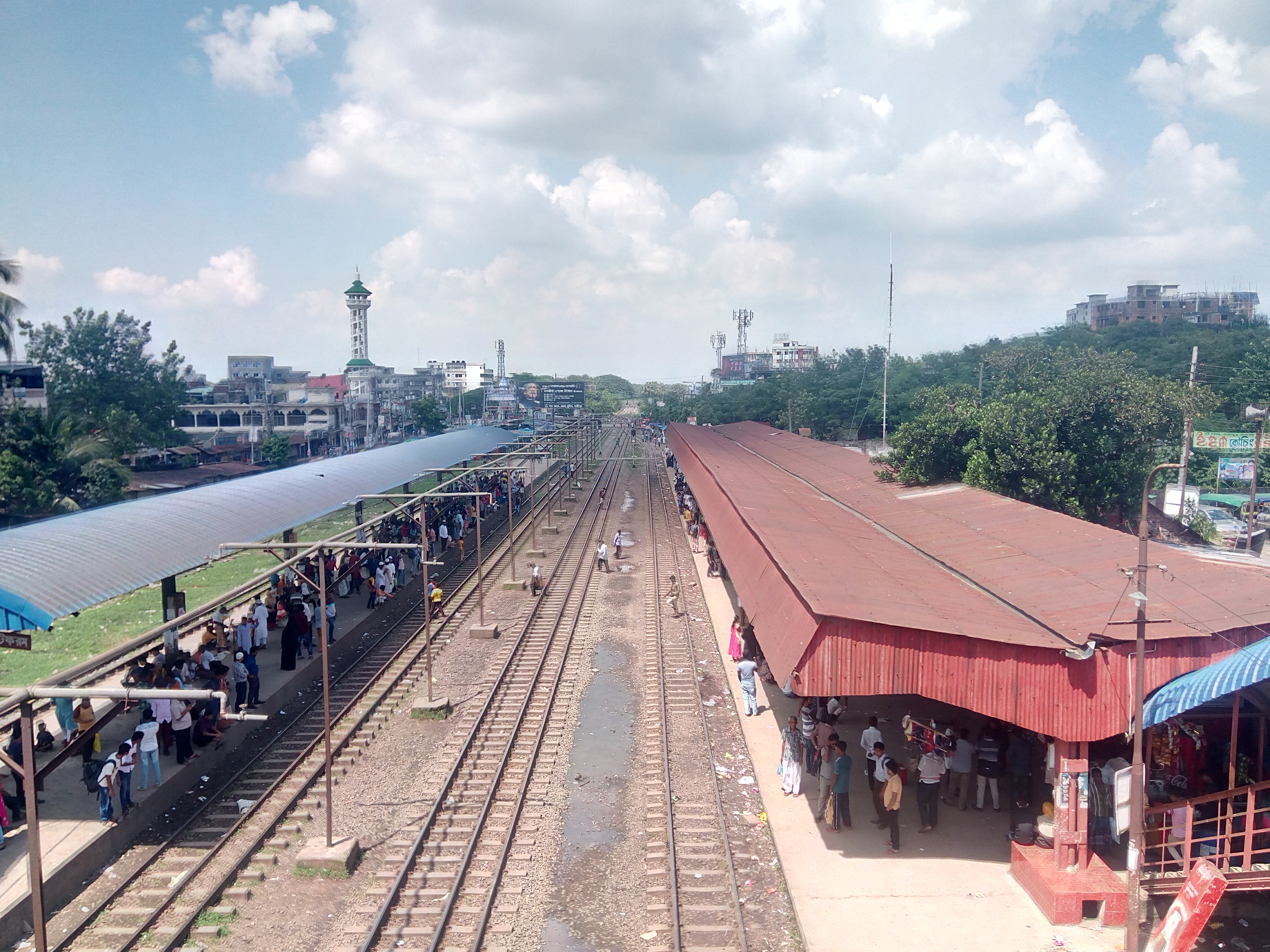
- Joydebpur Railway Station area

General information
- Location: Gazipur; Bangladesh
- Coordinates: 23.9981°N 90.4201°E
- System: Bangladesh Railway Station; Junction station
- Lines: Narayanganj–Bahadurabad Ghat line; Jamtoil-Joydebpur line
- Platforms: 2
- Tracks: Dual Gauge

Construction
- Structure type: Standard (on ground station)

Other information
- Status: Functioning
- Station code: BRJYR
- Zone(s): East Zone
- Division(s): Dhaka

History
- Opened: 1884-85
- Former names: Dacca State Railway

Services
Preceding station	Bangladesh Railway	Following station
Dhirasram towards Narayanganj	Narayanganj–Bahadurabad Ghat	Bhawal Gazipur towards Bahadurabad Ghat
Terminus	Jamtoil–Joydebpur	Mouchak towards Jamtoil Junction
Location

Joydebpur Junction Railway Station (Bengali: জয়দেবপুর জংশন রেলওয়ে স্টেশন) is a railway junction in Gazipur District of Dhaka Division in Bangladesh.

== History ==
Joydebpur railway station came up when Dacca State Railway constructed the Narayanganj-Mymensingh metre gauge railway track in 1884–85.

Consequent to the construction of the 4.8-kilometre-long (3.0 mi) Jamuna Bridge in 1998, there was reassessment of the requirements of the railways. First, a 99-kilometre-long (62 mi) new dual gauge line was to be constructed from Joydebpur to Jamtoil, to connect the eastern part of the Bangladesh railway system to the western part. The problem of two different gauges in two different parts of the country was solved by introducing dual gauge. Second, a 245-kilometre (152 mi) length of broad gauge track from Jamtoil to Parbatipur was to be converted to dual gauge. This made Joydebpur, a dual gauge railway station.
