= Jamuna Bridge =

Bridge in Bangladesh

Jamuna Bridge যমুনা সেতু
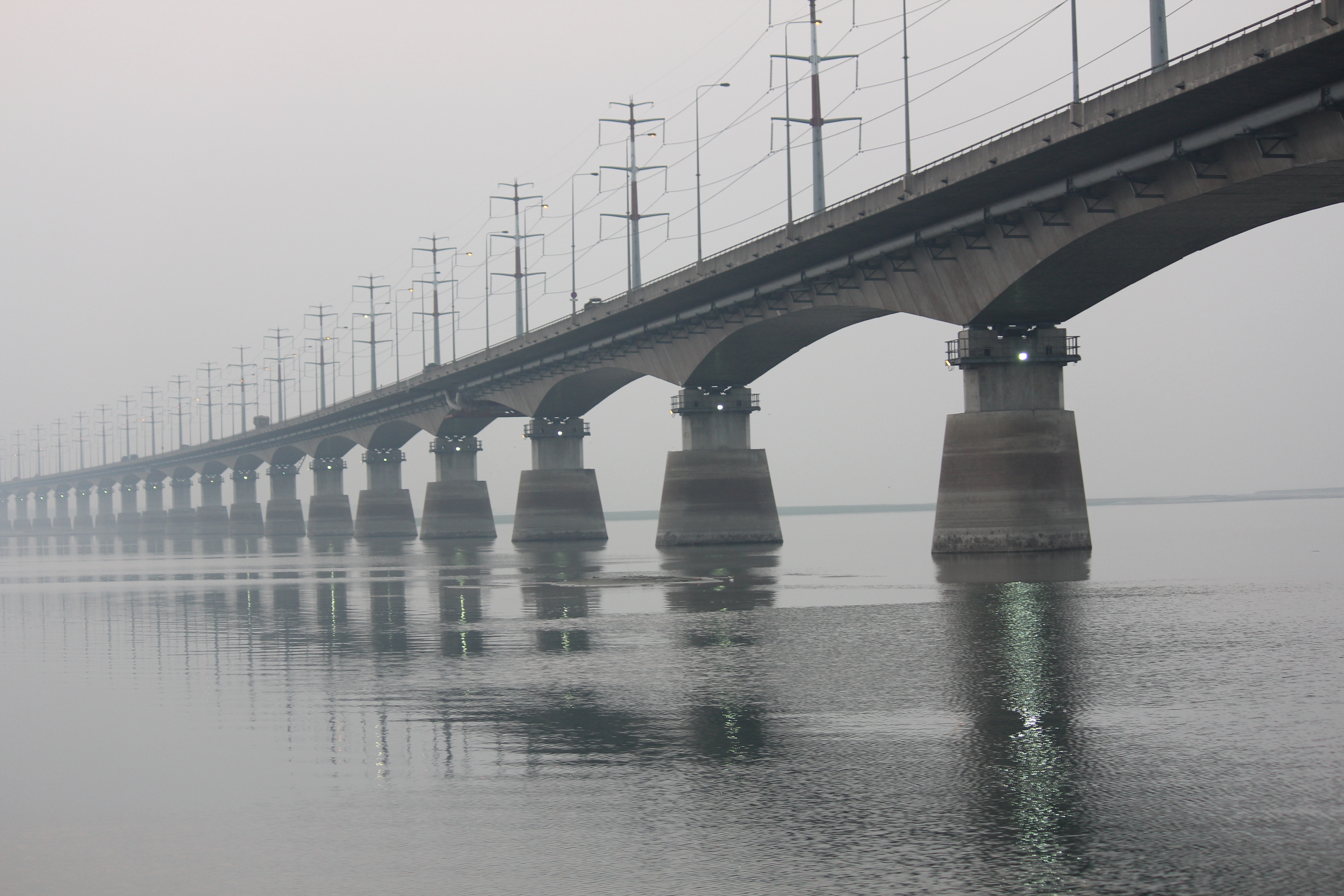
- Jamuna Multi-Purpose Bridge
- Coordinates: 24°23′55″N 89°46′42″E
- Carries: National Highway 405; Asian Highway 2
- Crosses: Jamuna River
- Locale: Tangail & Sirajganj
- Official name: Jamuna Multipurpose Bridge
- Other name: Jamuna Bridge
- Maintained by: Bangladesh Bridge Authority
- Next upstream: Jamuna Railway Bridge

Characteristics
- Design: Box girder bridge
- Material: Prestressed concrete
- Total length: 4.8 km
- Width: 18.5 m
- Longest span: 99 m

History
- Designer: T. Y. Lin International
- Constructed by: Hyundai Engineering & Construction
- Opened: June 1998

Statistics
- Toll: Yes

Location
- Interactive map of Jamuna Bridge যমুনা সেতু

Jamuna Multipurpose Bridge (Bengali: যমুনা বহুমুখী সেতু, romanized: Jamuna Bahumukhee Setu), is a bridge built over the river Jamuna in Bangladesh. The bridge opened to traffic in June 1998. With a length of 4.8 kilometres, it is the second longest bridge of Bangladesh. It connects Bhuapur on the Jamuna River's east bank to Sirajganj on its west bank. It was the 11th longest bridge in the world when constructed in 1998 and at present is the 6th longest bridge in South Asia. The Jamuna River, which it spans, is one of the three major rivers of Bangladesh, and the fifth largest in the world in discharge volume.

After the Jamuna Railway Bridge opened in 2025, the railway tracks on the Jamuna Bridge were removed to provide an additional 11 ft (3.4 m) of roadway space on the bridge.

== History of construction ==
Jamuna Multi-purpose Bridge showing 8 rows of bolts for 4 rails

The Jamuna River (Brahmaputra), along with the lower stretch of the Padma (Ganges) divides Bangladesh into nearly two equal halves. Until the construction of the Jamuna Bridge, all road and rail communication between the two parts of the country had to rely on time-consuming ferry services that were often disrupted because of navigability problems.

At the invitation of the Bangladesh government, the Japanese International Cooperation Agency (JICA) conducted a feasibility study in 1973 for the construction of a road-and-rail bridge over the Jamuna River.

After the completion of the JICA study in 1976, it was determined that the Jamuna project would cost $683 million with an economic rate of return (ERR) of only 2.6%. Due to the project being deemed not technically and economically feasible, the government initially abandoned it. However, in 1982, the government revived the project and initiated a new study to explore the feasibility of transporting natural gas to the western regions of the country across the Jamuna. Although an independent gas connector was not deemed economically viable, a study assessing the engineering feasibility and cost of a combined road-and-gas transmission bridge introduced the concept of a multipurpose bridge. The estimated cost for a 12-km long bridge with three road lanes was $420 million. Following the report, the cabinet decided to take immediate steps towards the project.

The Jamuna Multipurpose Bridge Authority (JMBA) was established through an ordinance by the President on 3 July 1985 to oversee the project implementation. To raise domestic resources, another ordinance introduced a Jamuna Bridge surcharge and levy, resulting in the mobilization of Tk. 5.08 billion until its abolition.

In 1986, the phase-I feasibility study identified the site between Sirajganj and Bhuapur (Tangail) as the most suitable location for the bridge. Subsequently, the phase-II feasibility study conducted between 1987 and 1989 confirmed the economic and technical viability of a road-cum-rail-cum-power bridge. The government of Bangladesh finalized funding arrangements for the bridge with IDA, ADB, and OECF of Japan in 1992. Construction contracts were awarded through international bidding in 1993, and the foundation stone of the bridge was laid on 10 April 1994. Physical implementation of the project began on 15 October 1994, with all components except the gas transmission line completed by June 1998. The bridge was officially opened for traffic on 23 June 1998.

Jamuna Multipurpose Bridge was constructed by Hyundai Heavy Industries at a cost of $696 million. However, the whole bridge project costed $1.24 billion for unknown reasons. The cost was shared by IDA, ADB, OECD, and the government of Bangladesh. Of the total, IDA, ADB and OECD supplied $200 million each through a loan with 1% nominal interest, and the remaining $96 million was borne by Bangladesh.

The main bridge is 4.98 kilometres (3.09 mi) long with 49 main spans of approximately 99 metres and two end spans of approximately 65 metres. Connected to the bridge are east and west approach viaducts each with 12 spans of 10 metre length and transition spans of 8 metres. The total width of the bridge deck is 18.5 metres.

The river crossing was designed to carry a dual two-lane carriageway, a dual gauge (broad and metre) railway, a high voltage (230 kV) electrical interconnector, telecommunication cables and a 750 mm diameter high pressure natural gas pipeline. The carriageways are 6.315 metres wide separated by a 0.57 metre width central barrier; the rail track is along the north side of the deck. On the main bridge, electrical interconnector pylons are positioned on brackets cantilevered from the north side of the deck. Telecommunication ducts run through the box girder deck and the gas pipeline is under the south cantilever of the box section. The bridge has been built by Hyundai Engineering and Construction (Korea) as a 'design and build' contract. TY Lin Assoc. of San Francisco carried out the design as a sub-contractor for Hyundai. The approach roads were constructed by Samwhan Corporation (Korea).

=== Political history ===
In 1949, Abdul Hamid Khan Bhashani first raised the demand for the construction of the Jamuna Bridge at the political level. During the 1954 provincial elections in East Pakistan, the construction of this bridge was included in the 21-point election manifesto of the United Front. On 6 January 1964, Mohammad Saifur Rahman, a member of parliament elected from Rangpur, raised a question in the provincial council asking whether the government had any intention of building a bridge over the Jamuna River. On 11 July 1966, Shamsul Haque, another member of the same council from Rangpur, presented a proposal for the construction of this bridge and it was unanimously accepted. In 1969, a UK-based firm called Freeman Fox and Partners conducted a preliminary feasibility study of the bridge. They recommended the construction of a rail-cum-road bridge near Sirajganj at an estimated cost of US$175 million. This study was preliminary in nature and they recommended conducting a detailed study. On the other hand, in his address to the nation on radio and television on the eve of the general elections in Pakistan in 1970, Awami League leader Sheikh Mujibur Rahman mentioned the construction of the Jamuna Bridge as his party's election promise.

After 1971 independence, the Awami League government announced the construction of a bridge over the Jamuna River in 1972 and allocated funds for it in the budget for 1972–73.

=== Naming ===
In 1994, then prime minister Khaleda Zia laid foundation stone. After the bridge was inaugurated by then prime minister Sheikh Hasina in 1998, its initial name was Bangabandhu Bridge after Sheikh Mujibur Rahman, the founding leader of Bangladesh. On February 26, 2025, the name of Bangabandhu Bridge was changed to the Jamuna Bridge.

== Specifications ==
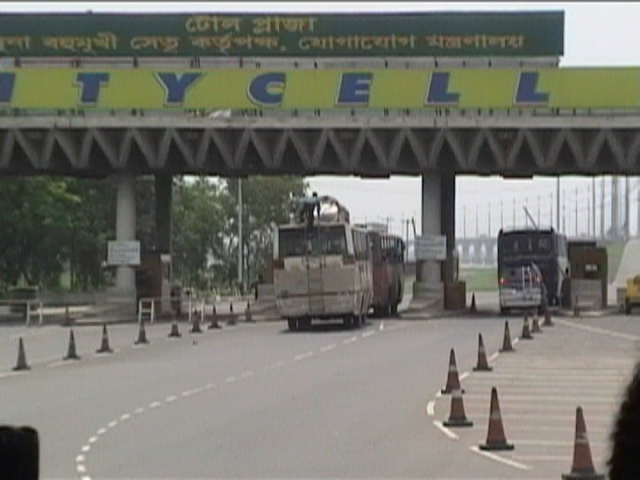
South toll plaza, Jamuna Bridge

=== Sub-structure ===
The bridge is supported on tubular steel piles driven into the river bed. Sand was removed from within the piles by airlifting and replaced with concrete. Out of the 50 piers, 21 piers are supported on groups of three piles (each of 2.5 m diameter) and 29 piers on groups of two piles (each of 3.15 diameter). The driving of 121 piles started on 15 October 1995 and was completed in July 1996.

The pier stems are founded on concrete pilecaps, whose shells were precast and infilled with in-situ reinforced concrete. The reinforced concrete pier stems support pierheads which contain bearings and seismic devices. These allow movement of the deck under normal loading conditions but lock in the event of an earthquake to limit overall seismic loads through the structure and minimise damage.

=== Superstructure ===
The main bridge deck is a multi-span precast prestressed concrete segmental structure, constructed by the balanced cantilever method. Each cantilever has 12 segments (each 4 m long), joined to a pierhead unit (2 m long) at each pier and by an in-situ stitch at mid span. The deck is internally prestressed and of single box section. The depth of the box varies between 6.5 metres at the piers to 3.25 metres at mid-span. An expansion joint is provided every 7 spans by means of a hinge segment at approximately quarter span. The segments were precast and erected using a two-span erection gantry.The erection gantry was designed by Butterley Engineering Ltd. from Ripley, Derbyshire, UK and at 200m long was thought to be one of the largest in the world at that time.

== Multipurpose Bridge ==
In addition to a road carriageway, the Jamuna Bridge carried a dual broad and metre gauge railway track. It also carries pylons for a powerline and telecommunication cables are installed inside the box. A high pressure gas pipe line is installed underneath the south cantilever of the deck slab of the box girder. After the opening of the Jamuna Railway Bridge, The Bangladesh Bridge Authority removed the rail tracks to widen the road carriageway.

== Litigation ==
Within a decade of inauguration, cracks were detected on the bridge prompting the authorities to impose limits on the number of vehicles allowed to cross at any given time. By early 2008, the government announced its intention to sue the South Korean conglomerate Hyundai for flawed design.

== Repair, strengthening and health monitoring ==
During March 2006-June 2006, Bangladesh University of Engineering and Technology experts worked to identify the causes of extensive cracking of prestressed concrete deck, web and pear head units of almost all segments of the Bridge. The cracks were identified primarily on the longitudinal direction of the bridge deck with some secondary crackings also in the transverse direction. In the analytical investigation, three dimensional model of the bridge was developed in finite elements methods.

Repair and strengthening effort included the replacement of modular expansion joints, strengthening the deck with carbon fiber reinforced polymer strips, web-deck connection improvement by carbon fiber reinforced fabrics and also sealing of non-structural cracks. These were conducted in phases. After repair and strengthening, performance of the bridge monitored. Health monitoring campaign was led by Prof A F M Saiful Amin from Bangladesh University of Engineering and Technology for first few years to take reference measurements.

== See also ==
- Jamuna Railway Bridge
- List of bridges on Brahmaputra River
- List of bridges
- List of bridges by length
- List of road-rail bridges
- Jamuna River
- Jamuna Cantonment
- 98th Composite Brigade (Bangladesh)
- Transport in Bangladesh
- Railway stations in Bangladesh
- Padma Bridge
