= Bhairab Bazar Junction railway station =

Railway Junction in Kishoreganj, Bangladesh

Bhairab Bazar Junction ভৈরব বাজার জংশন

General information
- Location: Bhairab, Kishoreganj District; Bangladesh
- Coordinates: 24.0501862°N 90.9781402°E
- System: Bangladesh Railway Station
- Lines: Tongi–Bhairab–Akhaura line; Mymensingh–Gouripur–Bhairab line
- Platforms: 3
- Tracks: Metre Gauge

Construction
- Structure type: Standard (on ground station)

Other information
- Status: Functioning
- Station code: BCI
- Zone(s): East Zone
- Division(s): Dhaka

History
- Opened: 1914

Services
Preceding station	Bangladesh Railway	Following station
Daulatkandi	Line; Tongi–Bhairab–Akhaura	Ashuganj
Kalikaprasad	Line; Mymensingh–Gouripur–Bhairab	Terminus
Location

Bhairab Bazar Junction railway station is a railway junction located in Bhairab, Kishoreganj District, Bangladesh. At least 3000 passengers use this railway junction regularly.

== History ==
In 1892, the company named Assam Bengal Railway formed in England. It took responsibility for the construction of railways in the eastern Bengal. On 1 July 1895, the Chittagong–Comilla and the Laksam–Chandpur lines were opened. In 1896, Comilla–Akhaura–Shahbajpur railway was established. In 1903, the Laksam–Noakhali railway branch line was started under the management of the Assam Bengal Railway. The line was acquired by the government of British Raj in 1905, and amalgamated with the Assam Bengal Railway on 1 January 1906. The Tongi–Bhairab–Akhaura line was laid between 1910 and 1914.
