= Sirajganj =

Sirajganj সিরাজগঞ্জ
- City
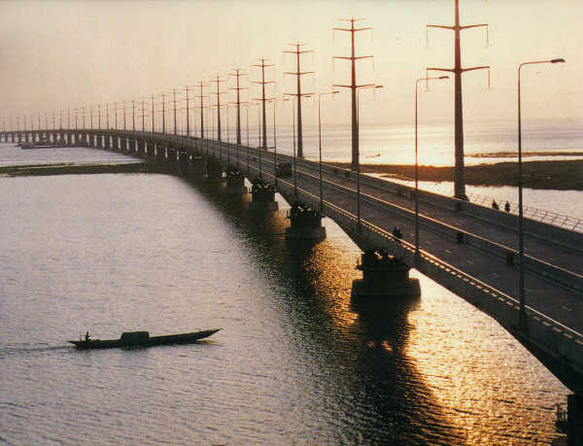
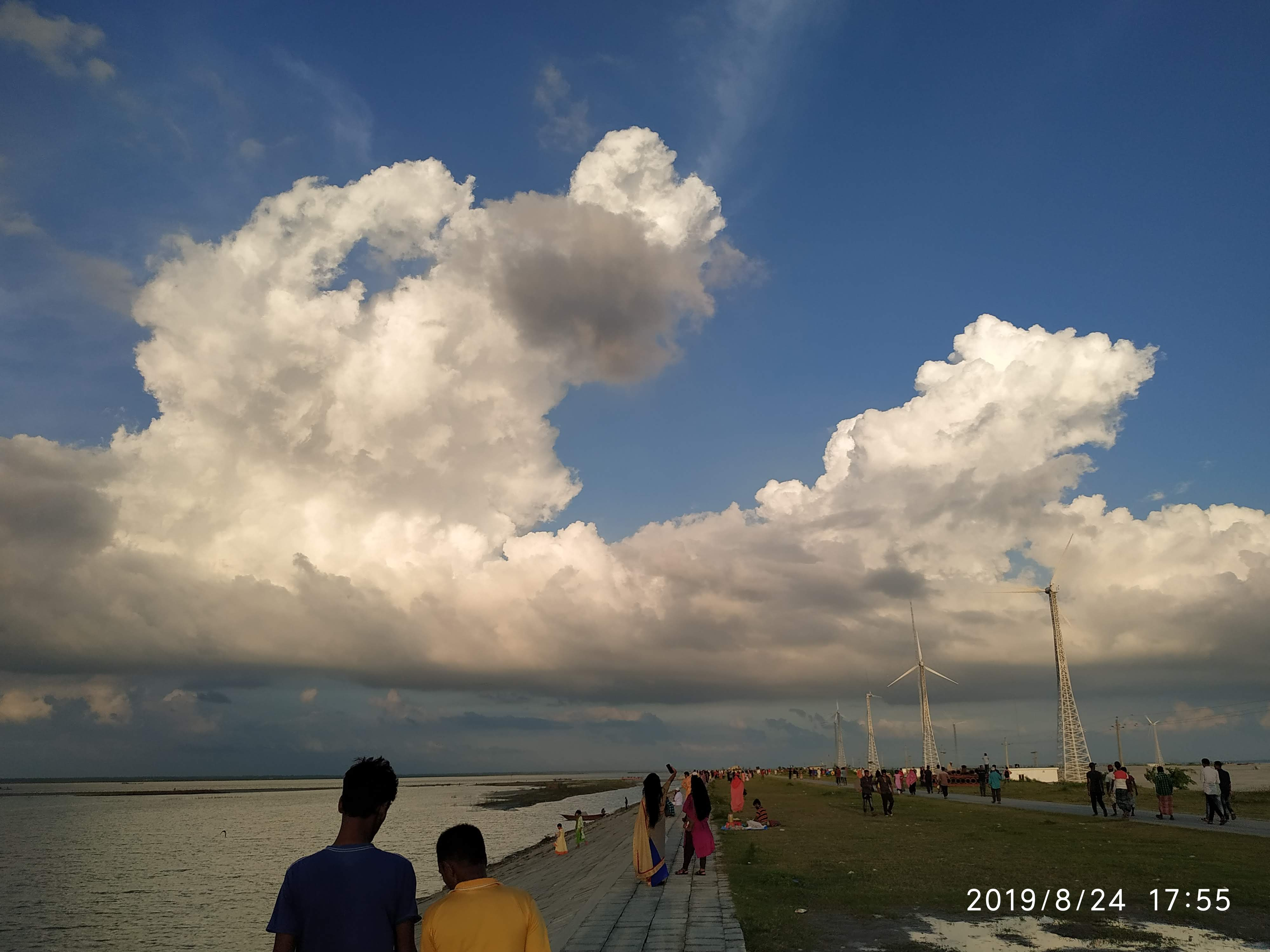
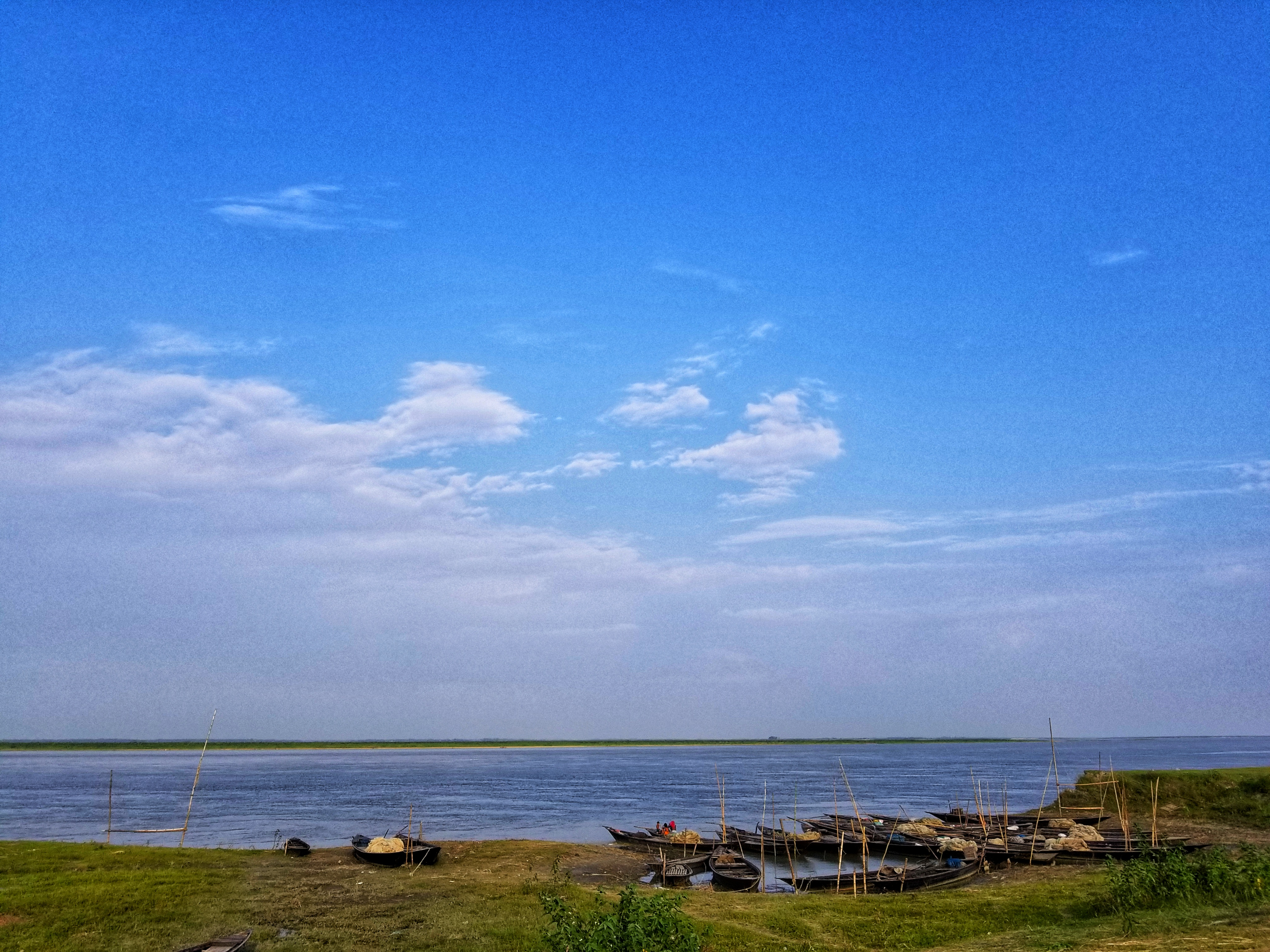
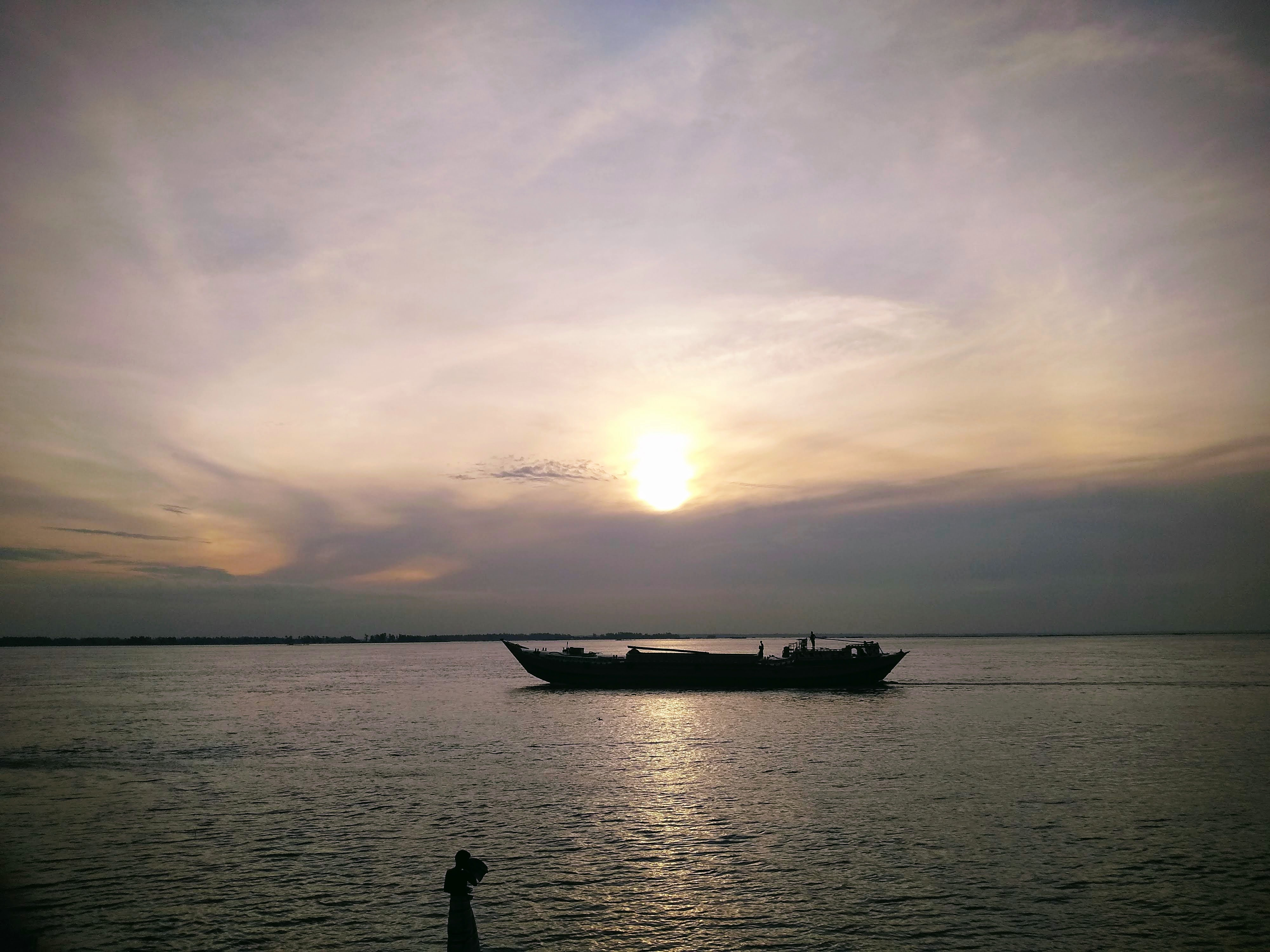
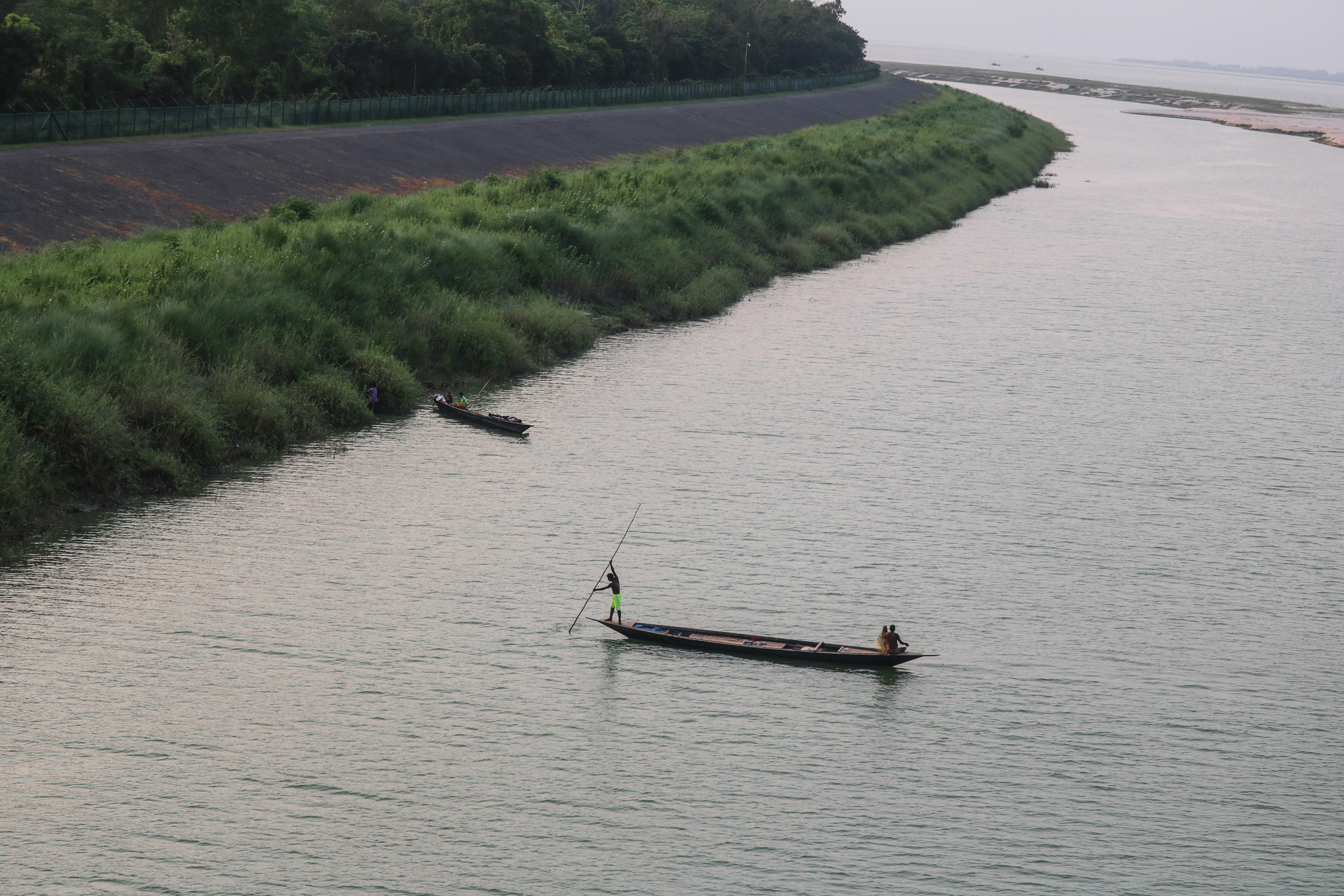
- Clockwise from top-left: Jamuna Bridge, Jamuna Eco Park, Hard Point, Bank of Jamuna River, China Barrage

- Location within Bangladesh Rajshahi division Location within Bangladesh
- Coordinates: 24°27′36″N 89°42′18″E
- Country: Bangladesh
- Division: Rajshahi
- District: Sirajganj
- Upazila: Sirajganj Sadar
- Establishment: Early 1800s
- Municipality: 1869

Government
  - Type: Municipality
  - Mayor: vacant

Area
  - Total: 31.27 km^{2} (12.07 sq mi)
  - Land: 31.3 km^{2} (12.07 sq mi)
- Elevation: 16 m (52 ft)

Population
  - Total: 450,000
  - Density: 14,000/km^{2} (37,000/sq mi)
- Time zone: UTC+6 (BST)
- Postal code: 6700

Sirajganj (Note: Bengali: সিরাজগঞ্জ, romanised: Sirājagañja) is a city in north-western Bangladesh on the right bank of the Jamuna River, located in Rajshahi Division. It is the administrative headquarters of Sirajganj District and Sirajganj Sadar Upazila. It has a population of 450,000 (approx.) which makes it the 13th largest city in Bangladesh.

It is about 110 kilometres (68 mi) north west of the capital, Dhaka. It is the city where Pakistani Brig. Jehanzeb Arbab looted the bank back in 1971 during the Bangladesh Liberation War. It was once a principal centre of the jute trade.

== History ==
During British rule, Sirajganj was a town in the Pabna District of Eastern Bengal and Assam. Its location on the right bank of the Jamuna River or main stream of the Brahmaputra was a six-hour journey by steamer from the railway terminal at Goalundo. It was the chief river mart for jute in northern Bengal, with several jute presses. The jute mills were closed after the 1897 Assam earthquake. The population according to the 1901 census of India was 23,114.

== Demographics ==
Historical population
Year	Pop.	±% p.a.
1974	90,517	—
1981	97,141	+1.01%
1991	112,690	+1.50%
2001	131,634	+1.57%
2011	297,230	+8.49%
2022	405,000	+2.85%

According to the 2022 Bangladesh census, Sirajganj city had 46,888 households and a population of 450,000. Sirajganj had a literacy rate of 82.72%: 84.35% for males and 81.12% for females, and a sex ratio of 98.48 males per 100 females. 8.30% of the population was under 5 years of age.

According to the 2011 Bangladesh census, Sirajganj city had 35,556 households and a population of 450,000. 31,096 (19.57%) were under 10 years of age. The literacy rate (age 7 and over) was 63.22%, compared to the national average of 51.8%, and the sex ratio was 980 females per 1000 males.

=== Religion ===
Religions in Sirajganj city (2022)
Religion	Percent
Islam	94.47%
Hinduism	5.51%
Other or not stated	0.02%

In 2011, Muslims make up 90.23% of the population, while Hindus are 9.65% of the population. The Hindu population has remained relatively constant while the Muslim population has constantly increased. The remaining 0.12% people follow other religions, mainly Christianity and Sarnaism. There are 240 mosques, 30 temples and 1 Church in the city.

== Points of interest ==
- Jamuna Bridge
- Elliott Bridge
- Sirajganj Hard Point
- China Barrages
- Durjoy Bangla Statue
- Muktir Songram Statue
- Mujib Dorshon Statue
- Jamuna Eco Park
- Sirajganj Pouro Shishu Park
- Bahirgola Rail Bridge
- Tomb of Shah Sufi Afzal Mahmud
- Jamidar Bari
- Jame Mosque
- Sri Sri Mahaprabhu Akhra
- Jugal Kishore Temple
- Kalibari Temple
- Old Christian Cemetery
- House of Maulana Bhashani
- House of Jadav Chandra Chakravarti
- House of Syed Ismail Hossain Siraji
- House of Haimanti Shukla

== Transport ==
In the later half of the 19th century, Sirajganj was an important river port. It was the main collection point for jute produced in northern Bengal and western Mymensingh. After the 1897 Assam earthquake, which damaged infrastructure and shifted the course of the river farther from the city, its significance declined. It was eclipsed by Narayanganj, another river port, which also had a rail connection.

Not until 1915 was Sirajganj connected to the railway network, with the opening of the Sara-Sirajganj line. As of 2022, there is an intercity train to Dhaka six days a week.

East-West national highway N405 passes just south of the city. It runs east, across the Jamuna Bridge, about 24 kilometres (15 mi) to the Joydebpur–Jamalpur Highway at Elenga, and west about 16 kilometres (9.9 mi) to the Dhaka–Banglabandha Highway.

== Education ==
There are two medical schools in the city, the public Shaheed M. Monsur Ali Medical College, established in 2014, and the private North Bengal Medical College & Hospital, established in 2000. As of May 2019, they are respectively allowed to admit 51 and 85 students annually.

There are eight colleges in the city. They include Sirajganj Government College, founded in 1940, Islamia Government College (1887), and Government Rashidazzoha Women's College.

According to Banglapedia, Bonowari Lal Government High School (founded in 1869), Jnandayini High School (founded in 1884), Victoria High School (founded in 1898), and Saleha Ishaque Government Girls' High School (founded in 1937) are notable secondary schools.

== Sports ==
There is a multi-sport stadium named Shaeed Samsuddin Stadium

== Notable people ==
- Maulana Bhashani (1880–1976), Islamic scholar and politician active from British period to post-1971
- Zahid Hasan, actor, was born in Sirajganj in 1967.
- Mazharul Islam, poet and folklorist, completed his Higher Secondary Certificate from Sirajganj College in 1947.
- Abdul Latif Mirza, freedom fighter, founder of Latif Bahini, and member of parliament, died in Sirajganj in 2007.
- Ismail Hossain Siraji, poet and novelist, lived in Sirajganj.
- Haimanti Sukla, Indian singer, was born in what is now the Munshi Meherullah Road area of Sirajganj.
- Foysal Ahmed Fahim, footballer
