= Jamtoil–Joydebpur line =

Overview
- Status: Operational
- Owner: Bangladesh Railway
- Locale: Bangladesh
- Termini: Joydebpur; Jamtoil

Service
- Operator(s): Bangladesh Railway

History
- Opened: 1999

Technical
- Line length: 115 km
- Track gauge: Dual gauge 1,676 mm (5 ft 6 in) 1,000 mm (3 ft 3 3/8 in)

The Jamtoil–Joydebpur Line is a dual gauge railway line connecting Joydebpur and Jamtoil, Sirajganj District in Bangladesh. This track is under the jurisdiction of Bangladesh Railway.

== Jamalpur–Ibrahimabad section ==
A railway was constructed from Ibrahimabad to Dhaka and North Bengal to Tarakandi railway station in Sarishabari Upazila at a cost of about ৳250 crores to develop direct rail communication for the people of Mymensingh Division, which was inaugurated by Prime Minister Sheikh Hasina on 30 June 2012.
