= Sreenagar railway station =

Railway station in Bangladesh

Sreenagar শ্রীনগর

General information
- Location: Sreenagar Upazila, Munshiganj District; Bangladesh
- Coordinates: 23.5375°N 90.2914°E
- Owner: Bangladesh Railway
- Line: Dhaka–Jessore line
- Platforms: 2
- Tracks: 3

Construction
- Structure type: Standard (on ground station)
- Parking: Yes
- Cycle facilities: Yes
- Accessible: Yes

Other information
- Status: Opened
- Station code: SRNR
- Zone(s): East Zone
- Division(s): Dhaka

History
- Opened: 10 October 2023

Services
Preceding station	Bangladesh Railway	Following station
Nimtala towards Kamalapur	Dhaka–Jessore	Mawa towards Rupdia or Singia Junction
Location

Sreenagar Railway Station is railway station located in Sreenagar upazila of Munshiganj district. This railway station is under Dhaka–Jessore line. It is one of the three station in Munshiganj district which is constructed under Padma rail link project.

== History ==
The Ministry of Railways decided to build new 172 km railway line to connect Jashore with Dhaka via Padma Bridge. It was a link project of Padma Bridge. Under this project, 14 new stations were built and six stations were repaired. In 2023 the government decided to open this railway line partially from Dhaka to Bhanga, and Sreenagar station was opened to public at that time.
