= Kashiani Junction railway station =

Railway station in Bangladesh

Kashiani Junction Railway Station কাশিয়ানী জংশন রেলওয়ে স্টেশন

General information
- Location: Kashiani Upazila, Gopalganj District; Bangladesh
- Coordinates: 23.23649°N 89.7204523°E
- Owner: Bangladesh Railway
- Lines: Kalukhali-Gobra line Dhaka–Jessore line
- Platforms: 3
- Tracks: 5

Construction
- Structure type: Standard (on ground station)
- Parking: Yes
- Cycle facilities: Yes
- Accessible: Yes

Other information
- Status: Opened
- Station code: KSNI
- Zone(s): West Zone
- Division(s): Pakshi

History
- Opened: 1932; 94 years ago

Services
Preceding station	Bangladesh Railway	Following station
Byaspur	Line; Kalukhali-Bhatiapara Ghat	Bhatiapara Ghat
Terminus	Line; Kashiani- Gobra	Chapta
Maheshpur	Line; Dhaka–Jessore line	Lohagara
Route map
Location

Kashiani Junction Railway Station is a railway station located in Kashiani upazila of Gopalganj District. It is the second largest junction station in the southern Bangladesh after the Bhanga Junction railway station. It is also the only junction in Bangladesh which has 5 different routes.
