= Shibchar railway station =

Railway station in Bangladesh

Shibchar শিবচর
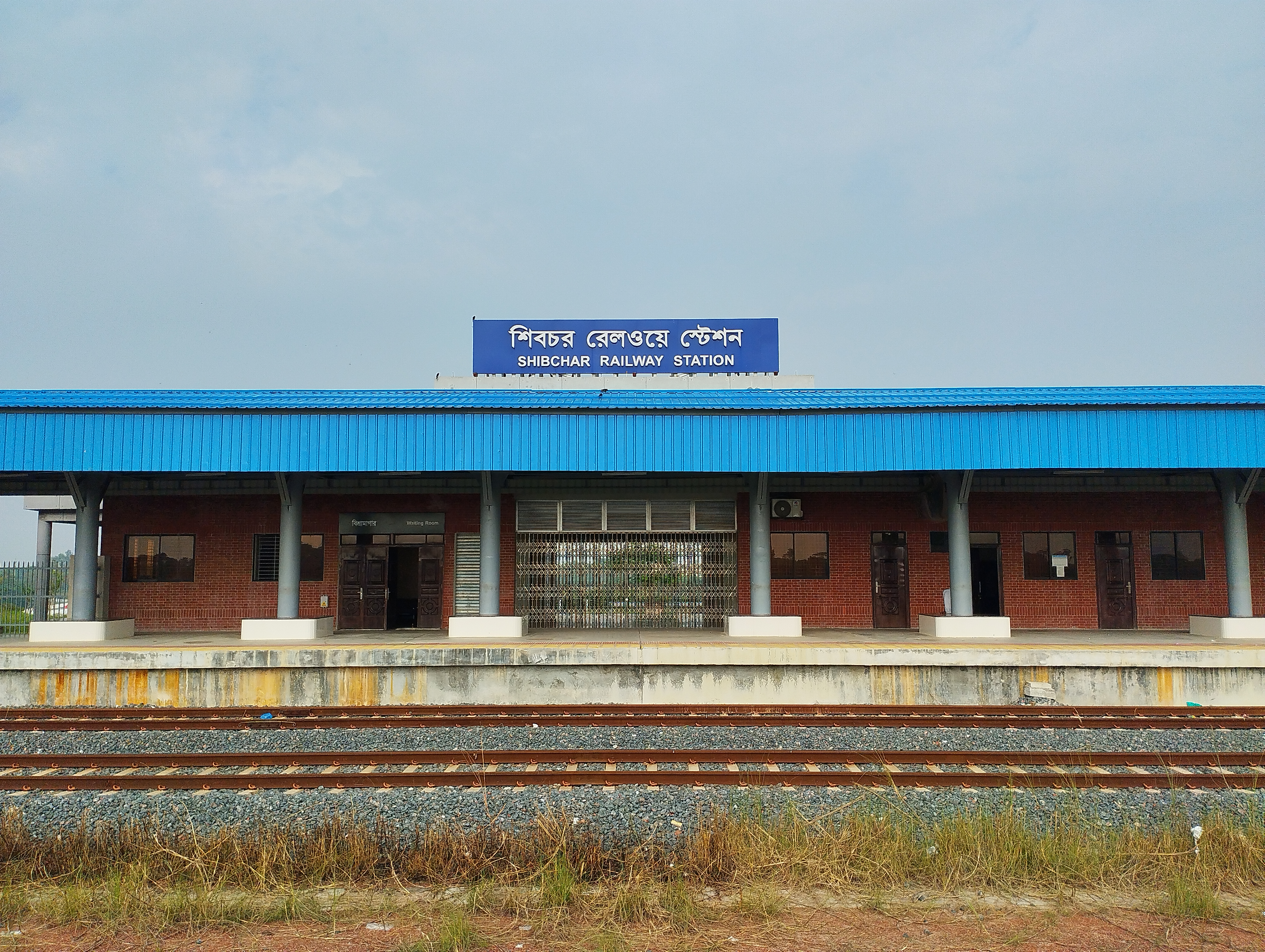

General information
- Location: Shibchar Upazila, Madaripur District; Bangladesh
- Coordinates: 23.386328°N 90.130117°E
- Owner: Bangladesh Railway
- Line: Dhaka–Jessore line
- Platforms: 2
- Tracks: 3

Construction
- Structure type: Standard (on ground station)
- Parking: Yes
- Cycle facilities: Yes
- Accessible: Yes

Other information
- Status: Opened
- Station code: SHBCR
- Zone(s): East Zone
- Division(s): Dhaka

History
- Opened: 10 October 2023; 2 years ago

Services
Preceding station	Bangladesh Railway	Following station
Padma towards Kamalapur	Dhaka–Jessore	Bhanga Junction towards Rupdia or Singia Junction
Location

Shibchar railway station is a railway station located in Shibchar upazila of Madaripur district. This is the only station in Madaripur district. This railway station is on the Dhaka–Jessore line. This station was formally opened on 10 October 2023.

== History ==
Ministry of Railways decided to build the new 172 km railway line to connect Jashore with Dhaka via Padma Bridge. It was a link project of Padma Bridge. Under this project 14 new stations were built and 6 stations were repaired. In 2023, the government decided to open this railway line partially from Dhaka to Bhanga. Shibchar railway station was open for the public to that time.
