= Narail railway station =

Railway station in Bangladesh

Narail নড়াইল

General information
- Location: Durgapur, Narail; Bangladesh
- Coordinates: 23.18953°N 89.51398°E
- Owner: Bangladesh Railway
- Line: Dhaka–Jessore line
- Platforms: 2
- Tracks: 3

Construction
- Structure type: Standard (on ground station)
- Parking: Yes
- Cycle facilities: Yes
- Accessible: Disabled access Computerized Ticketing Counters Luggage Checking System Food Plaza Kiosks WC Taxi Stand Public Transportation

Other information
- Status: Opened
- Station code: NARL
- Zone(s): West Zone
- Division(s): Pakshi

History
- Opened: December 24, 2024; 22 months ago

Services
Preceding station	Bangladesh Railway	Following station
Lohagara towards Kamalapur	Dhaka–Jessore	Jamdia towards Rupdia or Singia Junction
Location

Narail Railway Station is one of two railway stations on Dhaka–Jessore line located in Narail, Bangladesh. It is one of two railway stations in the Narail District are constructed under the Padma Bridge Rail Link project.

== History ==
Ministry of Railways built a 172 km broad-gauge railway. The railway line starts from Dhaka, capital of Bangladesh to Jessore. Under the Railway Link Project of Padma Bridge, 14 railway stations will be built and 6 railway station will be repaired. 310 rail bridges will be built for the new railway line. 66 of 310 are major and 244 are minor bridges. As part of this project, a railway station is under construction at Durgapur in Narail which was expected to be completed by April 2024. However it was completed on December 24, 2024.
