= Nabharan railway station =

Railway station in Jashore District, Bangladesh

Nabharan নাভারন

General information
- Location: Nabharan, Sharsha Upazila, Jashore District, Khulna Division; Bangladesh
- Coordinates: 23.05561°N 88.994496°E
- Owner: Bangladesh Railway
- Operator: Bangladesh Railway
- Lines: Jessore-Benapole Branch line Nabharan–Munshiganj line
- Platforms: 1
- Tracks: 2
- Train operators: Bangladesh Railway

Construction
- Structure type: Standard (on ground station)
- Parking: Yes
- Accessible: Yes
- Architectural style: Modern

Other information
- Status: Functioning
- Station code: NBN
- Zone(s): West Zone
- Division(s): Pakshi

History
- Opened: 1884; 142 years ago

Services
Preceding station	Bangladesh Railway	Following station
Benapole	Line; Jessore–Benapole Branch Line	Godkhali
Terminus	Line; Nabharan–Munshiganj line	Bagachra
Location

Nabharan railway station is a railway station located at Sharsha Upazila in Jashore District. This station is located on Jessore-Benapole Branch Line. The proposed Nabharan- Munshiganj line will also start from this station.
