= Bhatiapara Ghat railway station =

Railway station in Bangladesh

Bhatiapara Ghat Railway Station ভাটিয়াপাড়া ঘাট রেলওয়ে স্টেশন
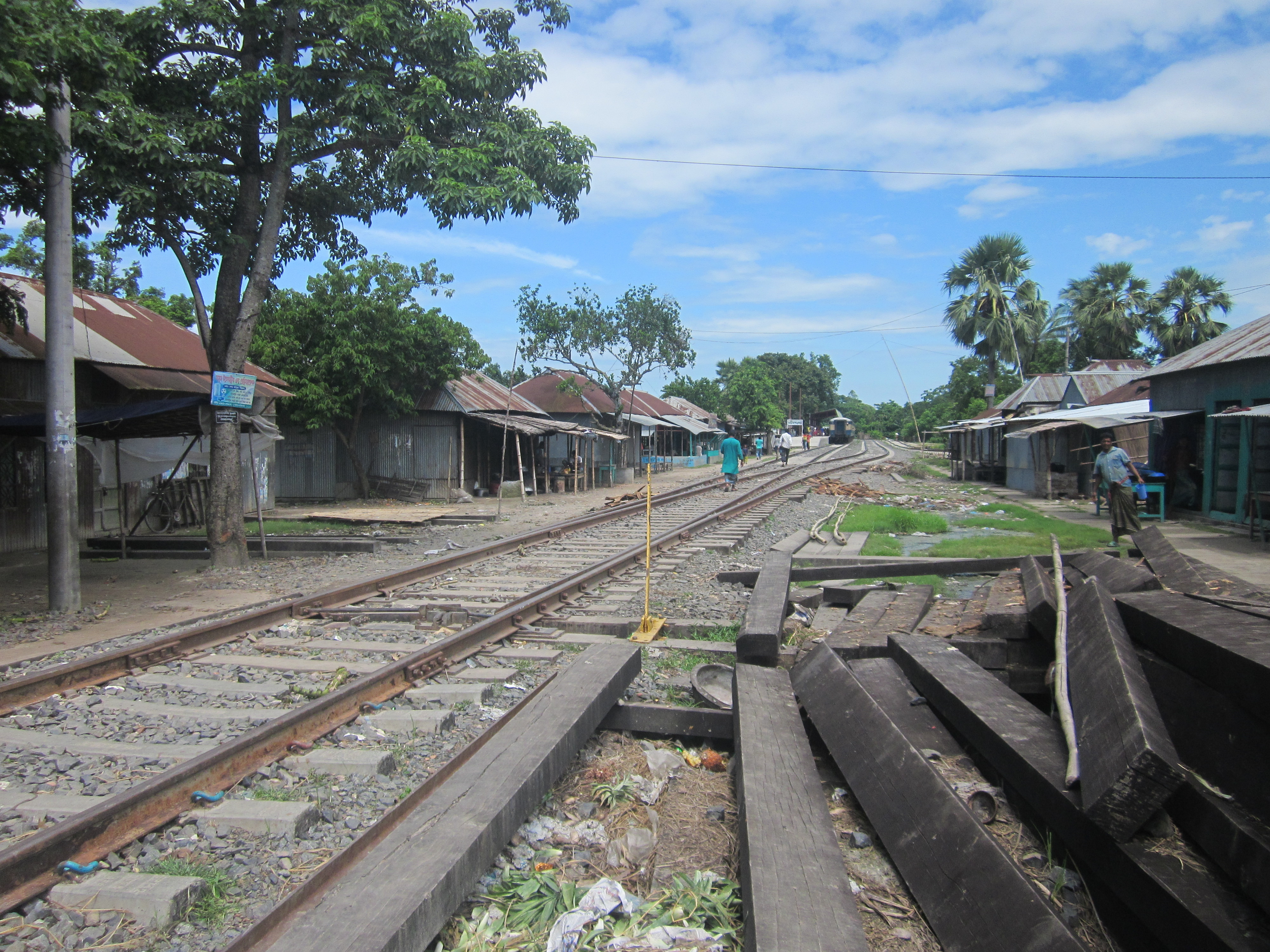
- Bhatiapara Ghat Railway Station

General information
- Location: Kashiani Upazila, Gopalganj District; Bangladesh
- Coordinates: 23.213485°N 89.698224°E
- Owner: Bangladesh Railway
- Line: Kalukhali-Gobra line
- Platforms: 1
- Tracks: 1

Construction
- Structure type: Standard (on ground station)
- Parking: No
- Cycle facilities: Yes
- Accessible: No

Other information
- Status: Opened
- Station code: BTG
- Zone(s): West Zone
- Division(s): Pakshi

History
- Opened: 1932; 94 years ago

Services
Preceding station	Bangladesh Railway	Following station
Kashiani Junction	Line; Kalukhali-Gobra	Terminus
Route map
Location

Bhatiapara Ghat railway station is a terminus railway station located in Kashiani Upazila in Gopalganj district. It was built in 1930s.
