= Ruposhi Bangla Express =

Train in Bangladesh

Overview
- Service type: Intercity
- First service: 24 December 2024
- Current operator: West Zone

Route
- Termini: Dhaka; Benapole
- Stops: 6
- Distance travelled: 216 km (134 mi)
- Average journey time: 3 hours 35 minutes
- Service frequency: 6 days each week
- Train number: 827/828
- Lines used: Dhaka-Jessore line Darshana-Jessore-Khulna line

On-board services
- Classes: AC Sleeper, AC Chair, Shovan Chair
- Seating arrangements: Yes
- Sleeping arrangements: Yes
- Catering facilities: Yes
- Entertainment facilities: Yes

Technical
- Track gauge: 1,676 mm (5 ft 6 in)

Ruposhi Bangla Express is an intercity express in Bangladesh Railway which connects Benapole to Dhaka. This train uses the Dhaka–Jessore line. The given train number for this train is 827/828.
