= Padma railway station =

Railway station in Bangladesh

Padma পদ্মা
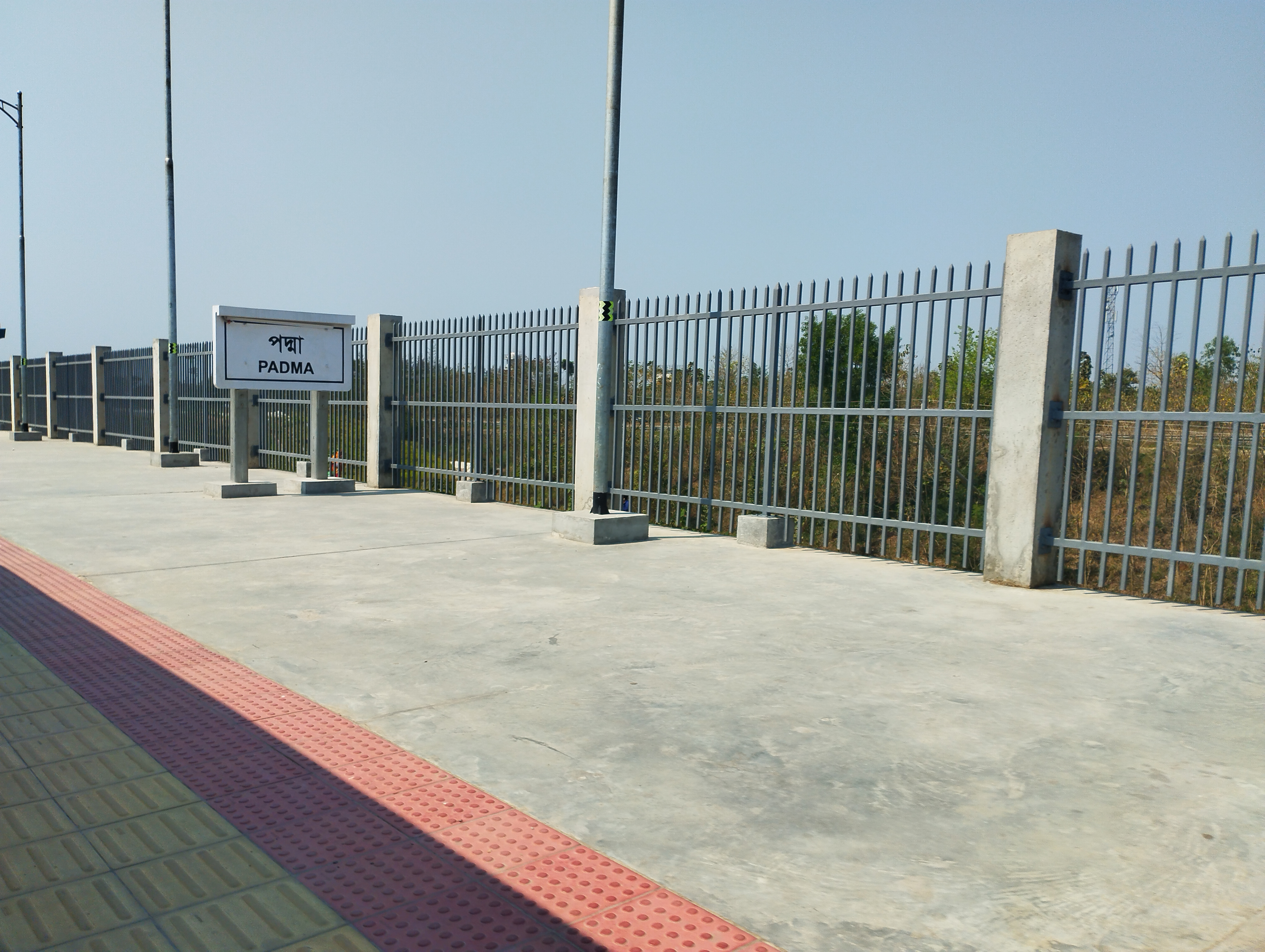

General information
- Other names: Padma Railway Station
- Location: Padma Bridge Road, Shibchar Upazila, Madaripur District; Bangladesh
- Coordinates: 23.3978506°N 90.2194808°E
- Owner: Bangladesh Railway
- Line: Dhaka–Jessore line
- Platforms: 2
- Tracks: 4

Construction
- Structure type: Standard (on ground station)
- Parking: Yes
- Cycle facilities: Yes
- Accessible: Yes

Other information
- Status: Opened
- Station code: PDMA
- Zone(s): East Zone
- Division(s): Dhaka

History
- Opened: 10 October 2023; 2 years ago

Services
Preceding station	Bangladesh Railway	Following station
Mawa towards Kamalapur	Dhaka–Jessore	Shibchar towards Rupdia or Singia Junction
Location

Padma Railway Station is a railway station on the Dhaka–Jessore line located in Shibchar Upazila, Madaripur District, Bangladesh.

== History ==
Ministry of Railways is constructing 172 km (107 mi) broad-gauge railway. The railway line starts from Dhaka, capital of Bangladesh to Jessore. Under the Railway Link Project of Padma Bridge, 14 railway stations will be built and 6 railway station will be repaired. 310 rail bridges will be built for the new railway line. 66 of 310 are major and 244 are minor bridges. Padma is one of the stations of the railway line under construction. Initially this railway station was named as Zajira railway station. But due to dispute between two neighboring districts over the name of the station, the government changed the name of this station to Padma railway station. According to December 2022, the construction progress of the station was 77.70%.
