= Padmabila Junction railway station =

Railway station in Bangladesh

Padmabila Junction পদ্মবিলা জংশন

General information
- Location: Basundia, Jessore Sadar Upazila, Jessore District; Bangladesh
- Coordinates: 23.14545°N 88.7716969°E
- Owner: Bangladesh Railway
- Line: Dhaka–Jessore line
- Platforms: 3
- Tracks: 5

Construction
- Structure type: Standard (on ground station)
- Parking: Yes
- Cycle facilities: Yes
- Accessible: Disabled access WC
- Architect: Standard (on Ground)

Other information
- Status: Opened
- Station code: PADMB
- Zone(s): West Zone
- Division(s): Pakshi

History
- Opened: December 24, 2024; 22 months ago

Services
Preceding station	Bangladesh Railway	Following station
Jamdia towards Kamalapur	Dhaka–Jessore	Rupdia towards Darshana Junction
Rupdia towards Darshana Junction	Darshana–Jessore–Khulna	Singia Junction towards Khulna
Location

Padmabila Junction Railway Station is a railway station on Dhaka–Jessore line located in Jessore Sadar Upazila, Jessore District, Bangladesh. It is one of four railway stations in the district are constructed under Padma Bridge Rail Link project.

== History ==
Ministry of Railways is constructing 172 km broad-gauge railway. The railway line starts from Dhaka, capital of Bangladesh to Jessore. Under the Railway Link Project of Padma Bridge, 14 railway stations will be built and 6 railway stations will be repaired. 310 rail bridges will be built for the new railway line. 66 of 310 are major and 244 are minor bridges. As part of the construction of the railway line, the railway junction is planned to be constructed at Padmabila area of Basundia Union Council of Jessore District. According to the route map, the railway will be divided into two parts from Padmabila Junction, one railway line will go to Rupdia and another to Singia railway station. The existing Rupdia railway station is part of Darshana–Jessore–Khulna line.
