= Benapole railway station =

Railway station in Jessore District, Bangladesh

Coordinates: 23.0431°N 88.9026°E

Benapole বেনাপোল

General information
- Location: Benapole, Jessore District; Khulna Division; Bangladesh
- Elevation: 11 m (36 ft)
- Owner: Bangladesh Railway
- Operator: West Zone
- Line: Darshana–Jessore–Khulna line
- Distance: 10 km from Nabharan; 35 km from Jashore Junction; 8 km from Bangaon Junction, West Bengal, India

Construction
- Parking: Yes
- Cycle facilities: Yes
- Accessible: Disabled access Computerized Ticketing Counters Luggage Checking System Food Plaza Kiosks WC Taxi Stand Public Transportation

Other information
- Status: Operating
- Station code: BEN
- Classification: Domestic/ International

History
- Opened: 1884; 142 years ago

Services
Preceding station	Bangladesh Railway	Following station
Terminus	Line; Jessore–Benapole Branch Line	Nabharan
Location

Benapole Railway Station (Bengali: বেনাপোল রেলওয়ে স্টেশন) is a railway station in Bangladesh situated in Benapole of Jessore District, close to the Bangladesh–India border. It is used to import goods from India. It is part of the Petrapole-Benapole line connecting Benapole to Petrapole in India. It is currently connected to almost all over the Bangladesh Railway because of the Padma Bridge.

== Train services ==
Train no.	Train name	Route
53	Betna Express-1	Khulna–Benapole
54	Betna Express-4	Benapole–Khulna
95	Betna Express-3	Khulna–Benapole
96	Betna Express-2	Benapole–Khulna
795	Benapole Express	Benapole–Dhaka
796	Benapole Express	Dhaka–Benapole
827	Ruposhi Bangla Express	Benapole–Dhaka
828	Ruposhi Bangla Express	Dhaka–Benapole
