= Bhanga Junction railway station =

Railway junction in Bangladesh

Bhanga Junction ভাঙ্গা জংশন

General information
- Location: Bamunkanda, Bhanga Upazila, Faridpur District, Dhaka Division; Bangladesh
- Coordinates: 23°22′26″N 90°01′30″E
- Owner: Bangladesh Railway
- Lines: Pachuria–Bhanga line Dhaka–Jessore line Bhanga–Kuakata line
- Platforms: 2
- Tracks: 6

Construction
- Structure type: Standard (on ground station)
- Parking: Yes
- Cycle facilities: Yes
- Accessible: Disabled access Computerized Ticketing Counters Taxi Stand Public Transportation
- Architectural style: Iconic

Other information
- Status: Operational
- Station code: BHGJ
- Zone(s): East Zone
- Division(s): Dhaka

History
- Opened: 2023; 3 years ago

Services
Preceding station	Bangladesh Railway	Following station
Bhanga towards Pachuria Junction	Pachuria–Bhanga	Terminus
Shibchar towards Kamalapur	Dhaka–Jessore	Nagarkanda towards Rupdia or Singia Junction
Terminus	Bhanga–Kuakata	Baraitala towards Kuakata
Location

Bhanga Junction Railway Station is a junction station of Bangladesh. It is a junction which is being built in Bhanga. It will connect Dhaka with Jessore, Rajbari and Port of Payra through Padma Bridge. Its construction is likely to be end in June 2023.

== History ==
Padma Bridge Rail Link Project brings South and South Western regions of Bangladesh under the railway network. In the first phase, a 172 km broad gauge railway line is being constructed from Dhaka's Kamalapur to Jessore in the southwestern district. The rail link project is scheduled to be completed in 2024. From December 2022, trains have been running on the 51 km railway from the stations of Mawa to Bhanga. Construction of Rajbari–Bhanga line from the existing Bhanga railway station to the area further east made the new station a junction station. Construction of railway from Bhanga Junction railway station to Payra Port is in progress. Bhanga junction is being developed as an iconic station incorporating all modern railway features. The station building is building on 6,516 square metres for budget ৳283.32 crore (US$23 million).

== Routes ==
The station will use three railway lines:

- Rajbari–Bhanga line
- Dhaka–Jessore line
- Bhanga–Kuakata line
