= Lohagara railway station =

Railway station in Bangladesh

Lohagara লোহাগড়া

General information
- Location: Station Road, Lohagara Upazila, Narail District; Bangladesh
- Coordinates: 23.1985°N 89.6599°E
- Owner: Bangladesh Railway
- Line: Dhaka–Jessore line
- Platforms: 2
- Tracks: 3

Construction
- Structure type: Standard (on ground station)
- Parking: Yes
- Cycle facilities: Yes
- Accessible: Yes

Other information
- Status: Opened
- Station code: LHGR
- Zone(s): West Zone
- Division(s): Pakshi

History
- Opened: December 24, 2024; 20 months ago

Services
Preceding station	Bangladesh Railway	Following station
Kashiani Junction towards Kamalapur	Dhaka–Jessore	Narail towards Rupdia or Singia Junction
Location

Lohagara railway station is a railway station in Lohagara upazila, Narail District. This station is formally opened on 24 December 2024. The station code is for the station is LHGR.

== Train service ==
As of December 2024, only Jahanabad Express stop here.
