= Keraniganj railway station =

Railway station in Bangladesh

Keraniganj কেরানীগঞ্জ

General information
- Location: Ghoshkandi, Keraniganj Upazila, Dhaka District; Bangladesh
- Coordinates: 23°38′57.4″N 90°25′7.96″E
- Owner: Bangladesh Railway
- Line: Dhaka–Jessore line
- Platforms: 2
- Tracks: Dual Gauge

Construction
- Structure type: Elevated
- Parking: Yes
- Cycle facilities: Yes
- Accessible: Disabled access Computerized Ticketing Counters Luggage Checking System Food Plaza Kiosks WC Taxi Stand

Other information
- Status: Constructing
- Station code: KRNJ
- Zone(s): East Zone
- Division(s): Dhaka

History
- Opened: 10 October 2023

Services
| Preceding station | Bangladesh Railway | Following station |
|---|---|---|
| Gendaria towards Kamalapur | Dhaka–Jessore transfer at Gendaria | Nimtala towards Rupdia or Singia Junction |
Location

Keraniganj Railway Station is a railway station on the Dhaka–Jessore line located in Keraniganj Upazila, Dhaka District, Bangladesh. This modern railway station is situated near Stan Bazar, is not so far from Baluchar of Munshiganj District, which is under construction. It is the first elevated railway station in the country.

== History ==
Ministry of Railways is constructing 172 km broad-gauge railway. The railway line starts from Dhaka, capital of Bangladesh to Jessore. Under the Railway Link Project of Padma Bridge, 14 railway stations will be built and 6 railway station will be repaired. 310 rail bridges will be built for the new railway line. 66 of 310 are major and 244 are minor bridges. Keraniganj is one of the stations of the railway line under construction. According to November 2022, the construction progress of the station was 75%. As of October 2023, the stations' construction was still ongoing and it was said that it would be operational from January 2024.
