= List of railway lines in Bangladesh =

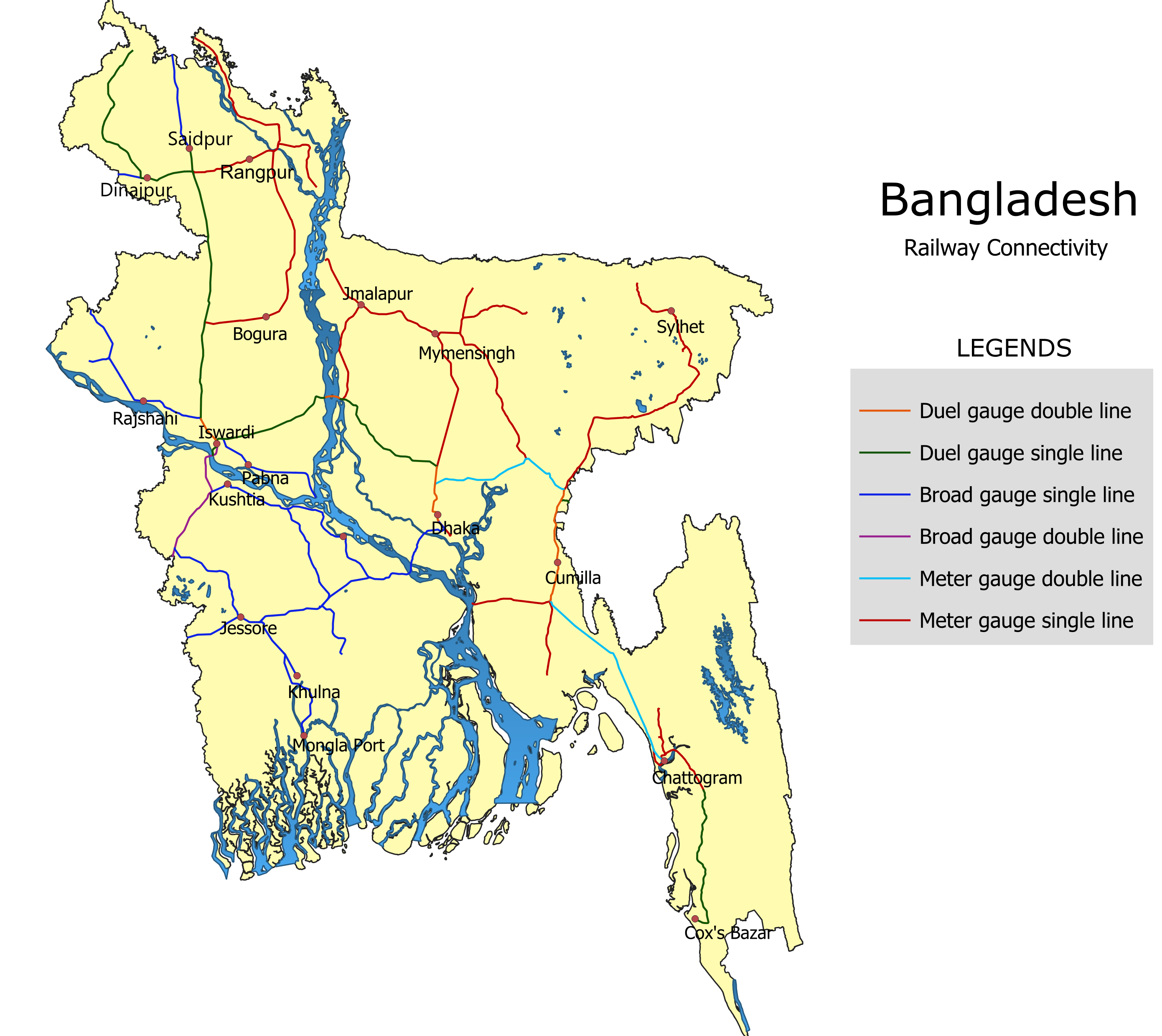
Railway map of Bangladesh

The following is a list of conventional lines of rail transport in Bangladesh.

== History ==
The first railway line in Bangladesh was laid in 1862 by the British Raj. At that time Bangladesh didn't exist and its land was part of the Bengal Presidency. On 15 November of that year, Eastern Bengal Railway, the predecessor of Bangladesh Railway, opened the first railway line from Darshana railway station to Jagati railway station. In 1885 another railway line was built from Narayanganj to Mymensingh. In 1895, the railway line from Comilla to Chittagong was built. In 1914, a new railway was built from Akhaura to Tongi. After three years of construction, the railway line that connects Shayestaganj to Habiganj was opened in 1915. Another section from Shayestaganj to Balla was opened in 1929. Before the partition of India, many railway lines were built in Eastern Bengal, such as Chittagong–Dohazari, regional lines in Mymensingh region and others.

After 1947, East Bengal got 2606.59 km railway. Until Bangladesh became independent in 1971, the railways were operated by Pakistan Eastern Railway. After independence this was taken over by Bangladesh Railway.

== Bangladesh Railway ==
=== East Zone ===
- Chittagong Circular Railway
- Akhaura–Kulaura–Chhatak line
- Akhaura–Laksam–Chittagong line
- Habiganj Bazar–Shaistaganj–Balla line
- Kulaura–Shahbajpur line
- Narayanganj–Bahadurabad Ghat line
- Tongi–Bhairab–Akhaura line
- Mymensingh–Gouripur–Bhairab line
- Chittagong–Cox's Bazar line
- Dhaka–Jessore line
- Laksam–Noakhali line

=== West Zone ===
- Rajbari–Bhanga line
- Chilahati–Parbatipur–Santahar–Darshana line
- Darshana–Jessore–Khulna line
- Iswardi–Sirajganj line
- Joydebpur–Bangabandhu Shetu East line
- Jessore–Jhenidah Light Railway
- Kalukhali–Gobra line
- Khulna–Bagerhat Railway
- Burimari–Lalmonirhat–Parbatipur line
- Chilahati–Parbatipur–Santahar–Darshana line
- Old Malda–Abdulpur line
- Iswardi–Sirajganj line
- Santahar–Kaunia line
- Parbatipur–Panchagarh line
- Khulna–Mongla Port line
- Teesta Junction–Kurigram–Chilmari line

== Mass Rapid Transit ==
- MRT Line 1
- MRT Line 2
- MRT Line 4
- MRT Line 5
- MRT Line 6

== Cross-border connection with India ==
Listed state-wise and clockwise from southeast West Bengal to north West Bengal, Megahalaya, Assam to Tripura

- Functional:
  - West Bengal
    - Benapole–Petrapole
    - Darshana–Gede
    - Rohanpur–Singhabad
    - Biral–Radhikapur
    - Changrabandha–Burimari (was abandoned, but has been revived)
    - Chilahati–Haldibari
  - Tripura
    - Shahbazpur–Maishashan (was abandoned, but has been revived)
    - Akhaura–Agartala
- Abandoned, destroyed or dismenatled
  - West Bengal
    - Lalgola–Damukdia–Bheramara (was dismantled after 1947 partition)
    - Mogalhat–Gitaldaha (was destroyed by 1978 flood]
  - Assam
    - Hatisinghmari–Rowmari–Dewanganj (was destroyed in 1950 Assam earthquake)
  - Meghalaya
    - Companyganj–Dawki–Cherrapunji (was destroyed in 1897 Assam earthquake)

== Future line ==
=== Under Construction ===
- Sirajganj–Bogra line

=== Under planning ===
- Bhanga–Kuakata line
- Tongi–Manikganj–Paturia Ghat line
- Janalihat–Kaptai line
- Narayanganj–Laksam chord line
- Nabharan–Munshiganj line
- Darshana–Mujibnagar–Meherpur line
