= Nimtala railway station =

Railway station in Bangladesh

Nimtala নিমতলা

General information
- Location: Sirajdikhan Upazila, Munshiganj District; Bangladesh
- Coordinates: 23.6106719°N 90.0382916°E
- Owner: Bangladesh Railway
- Line: Dhaka–Jessore line
- Tracks: Dual Gauge

Construction
- Structure type: Standard (on ground station)
- Parking: Yes
- Cycle facilities: Yes
- Accessible: Disabled access Computerized Ticketing Counters Luggage Checking System Food Plaza Kiosks WC Taxi Stand Public Transportation

Other information
- Status: Opened
- Station code: NMTL
- Zone(s): East Zone
- Division(s): Dhaka

History
- Opened: 10 October 2023

Services
Preceding station	Bangladesh Railway	Following station
Keraniganj towards Kamalapur	Dhaka–Jessore	Sreenagar towards Rupdia or Singia Junction
Location

Nimtala Railway Station is a railway station under on Dhaka–Jessore line located in Sirajdikhan Upazila, Bangladesh. It is one of three railway stations in the Munshiganj District constructed under Padma Bridge Rail Link project.

== History ==
Ministry of Railways is constructing 172 km broad-gauge railway. The railway line starts from Dhaka, capital of Bangladesh to Jessore. Under the Railway Link Project of Padma Bridge, 14 railway stations will be built and 6 railway station will be repaired. 310 rail bridges will be built for the new railway line. 66 of 310 are major and 244 are minor bridges. It was decided to construct this station next to the Dhaka–Bhanga Expressway as a station on the Dhaka–Jessore line, 27 km away from the Kamalapur railway station. Besides this, 100 acres of land was acquired for the purpose of constructing an inland container depot next to the station. With a length of 1,400 meters, this railway station is the second largest railway station on the railway line. The station was scheduled to be open in December 2023. However, the railway minister announced in September 2023 that the station would be operational after the inauguration of the Dhaka–Bhanga section of the railway line. According to the information given in 2024, the entire construction of the station would be completed by the first month of this year.
