= Madhukhali Junction railway station =

Railway junction in Bangladesh

Madhukhali Junction Railway Station মধুখালী জংশন রেলওয়ে স্টেশন

General information
- Location: Faridpur district, Dhaka division Bangladesh
- Coordinates: 23.5468°N 89.6307°E
- System: Railway station in Bangladesh
- Owner: Bangladesh Railway
- Operator: Bangladesh Railway
- Lines: Kalukhali–Gobra line, Madhukhali–Magura line
- Platforms: 1
- Tracks: 3
- Train operators: Western railway

Construction
- Structure type: On ground
- Parking: Yes
- Cycle facilities: Yes
- Accessible: Yes

Other information
- Station code: FDP
- Zone(s): West Zone

History
- Opened: 1932
Route map
Location

Madhukhali Junction Railway station is a station of Faridpur district in Bangladesh.

== History ==
The railway from Kalukhali to Bhatiapara Ghat was constructed in 1932 as a branch of the Kushtia-Goaland Ghat line built in 1871. At that time Madukhali railway station was built as a station of this line. Madhukhali became a junction station when the railway was built from this station to Kamarkhali Ghat.

== Services ==
The list of trains passing through Madukhali Junction Railway Station are given below:

- Tungipara Express
- Bhatiapara Express
