= Amirabad railway station =

Railway station in Faridpur District, Bangladesh

Amirabad আমিরাবাদ
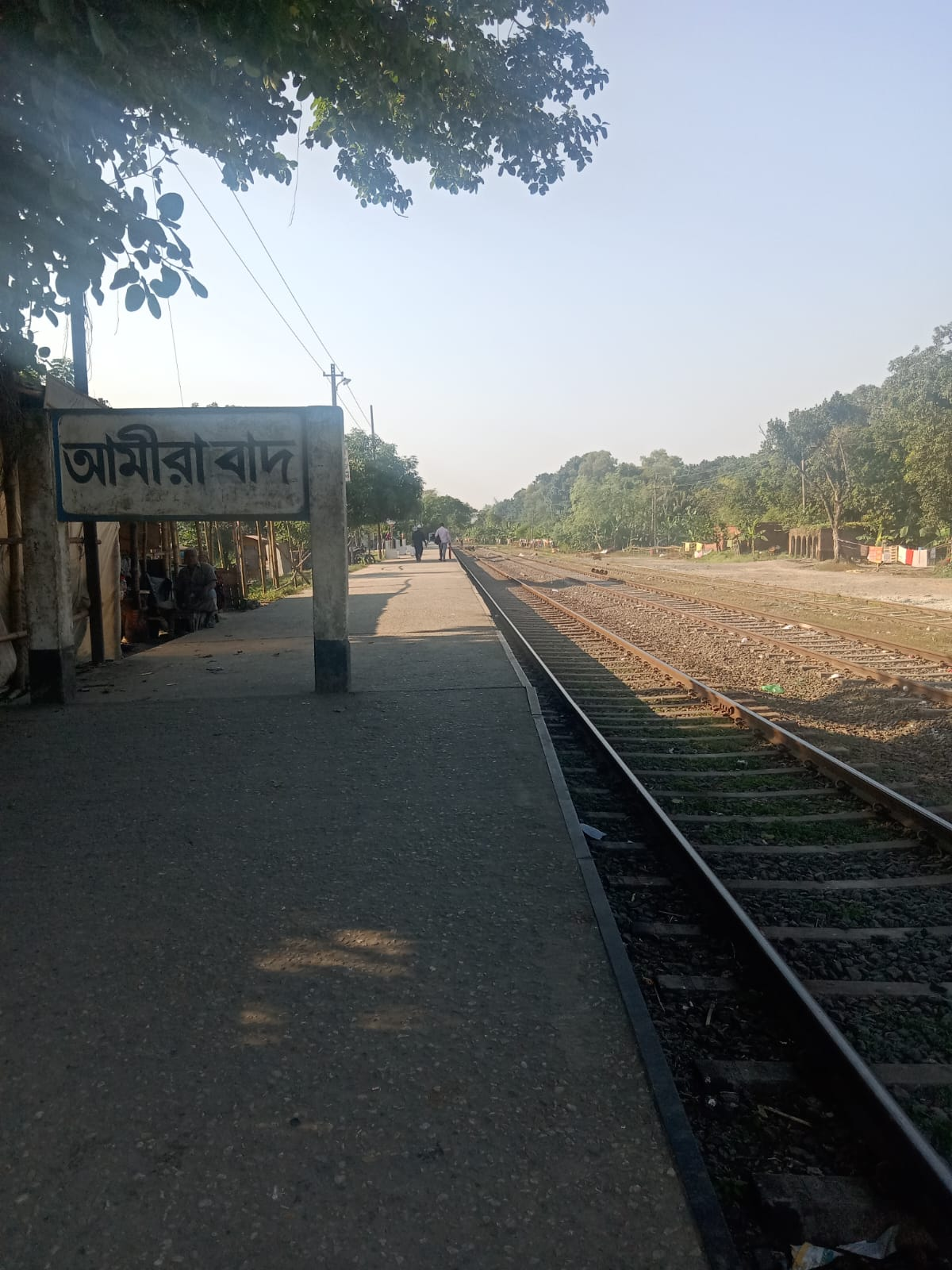

General information
- Location: Faridpur Sadar Upazila, Faridpur District; Bangladesh
- Coordinates: 23.6396°N 89.7443°E
- System: Bangladesh Railway
- Line: Pachuria–Bhanga line
- Platforms: 1
- Tracks: Broad Gauge

Construction
- Structure type: Standard (on ground station)

Other information
- Status: Functioning
- Station code: AMIR
- Zone(s): West Zone
- Division(s): Pakshi

Services
Preceding station	Amirabad railway station	Following station
Ambikapur (Bangladesh)	Line; Pachuria–Bhanga	Basantpur (Bangladesh)
Location

Amirabad railway station is a railway station on the route between Rajbari and Faridpur in Bangladesh. It is located 8 miles northwest of Faridpur town. It is one of the oldest railway stations in Bangladesh.

In 1899, the first railway between Rajbari and Faridpur was built. The station was established on the grounds of the Amirabad Estate, Faridpur. It was named after Zamindar Amir Ali Chowdhury. The train route was strategically important because of the nearby Goalundo Ghat. The railway connected western Bengal, including Calcutta, with much of eastern Bengal, including Dacca. It was part of the Eastern Bengal Railway.

In 2019, there was a controversy regarding the Bangladesh Railway employees at the station.

== See also ==
* Pachuria–Bhanga line
