= Faridpur railway station =

Railway station in Faridpur, Bangladesh

Faridpur ফরিদপুর
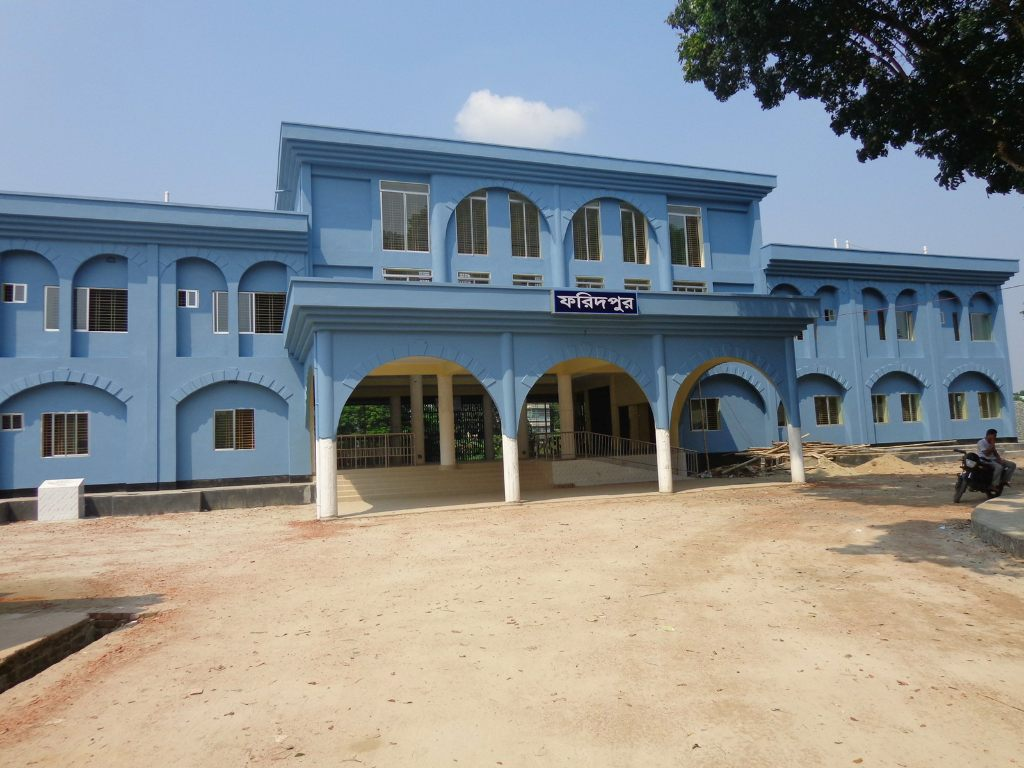
- Faridpur Railway Station area

General information
- Location: Faridpur; Bangladesh
- Coordinates: 23.6109928°N 89.8426744°E
- System: Bangladesh Railway Station
- Line: Pachuria–Bhanga line
- Platforms: 1
- Tracks: Broad Gauge

Construction
- Structure type: Standard (on ground station)

Other information
- Status: Functioning
- Station code: FDP
- Zone(s): West Zone
- Division(s): Pakshi

History
- Opened: 1899
- Former names: Eastern Bengal Railway

Services
Preceding station	Faridpur railway station	Following station
Ambikapur (Faridpur)	Line; Pachuria–Bhanga	Faridpur College
Location

Faridpur railway station is located in Faridpur District of Dhaka division, Bangladesh. It is a railway station located at Lakshmipur in Faridpur.

== History ==
Faridpur Railway Station was built in 1899. This section from Rajbari to Faridpur was closed in 1997 on the pretext of losses. Later the government decided the resume of the construction of the railway and in 2010, it resumed at a cost of about ৳90 crore. The construction was completed in 2014. After 17 years, the train service started again in 2014.

== Services ==
Only Rajbari Express and Madhumati Express pass through this station.
