= Jessore Junction railway station =

Railway station in Jessore, Bangladesh

Jashore Junction railway station যশোর জংশন রেলওয়ে স্টেশন
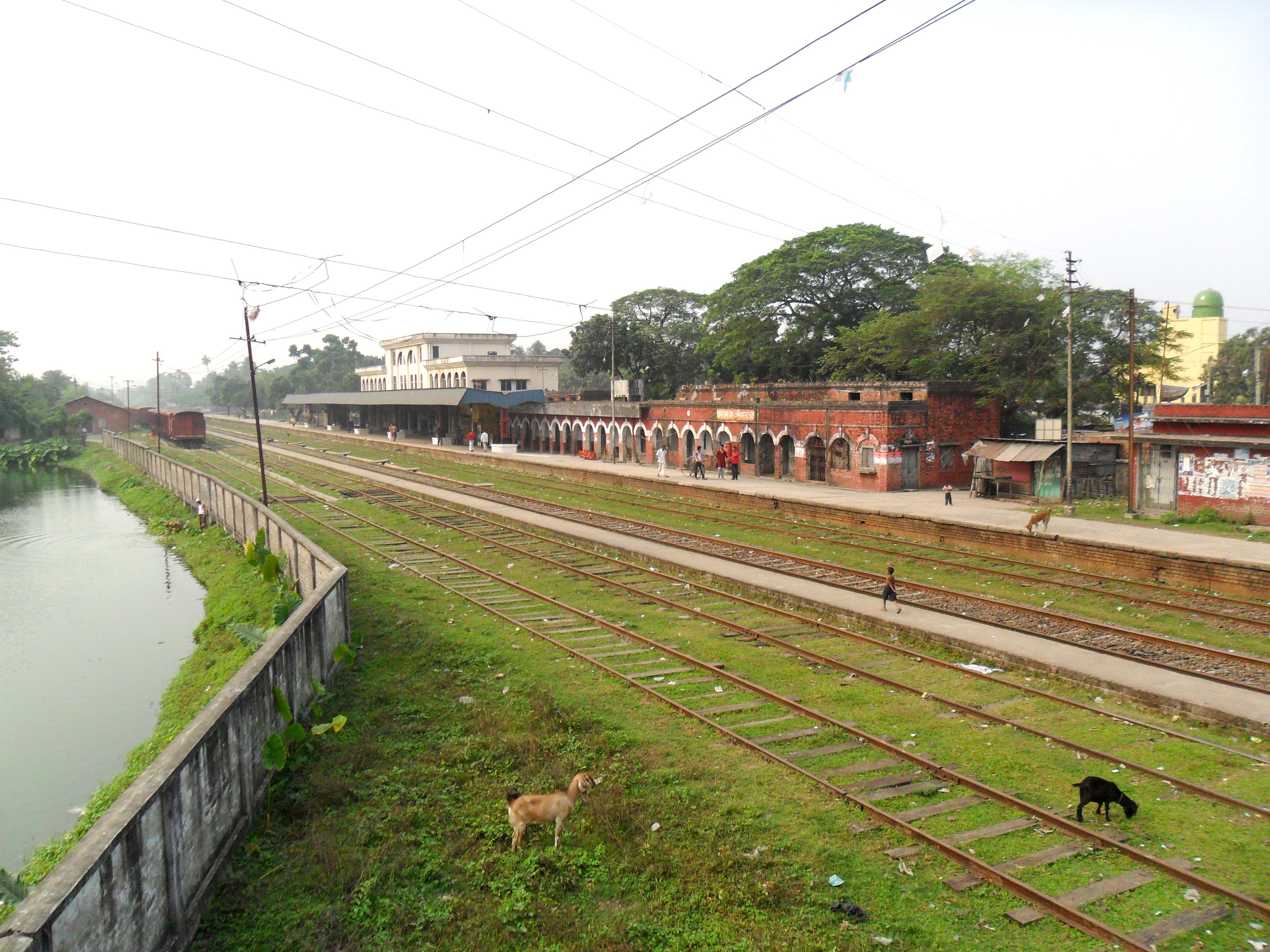
- Jessore Railway Station in January 2022

General information
- Other names: Jessore Junction Railway Station
- Location: Rail Road, Jessore, Jashore District, Khulna Division; Bangladesh
- Coordinates: 23.1543°N 89.2086°E
- Elevation: 6 m (20 ft)
- Owner: Bangladesh Railway
- Operator: Bangladesh Railway
- Lines: Darshana-Jessore-Khulna Line; Dhaka–Jessore line Jessore–Jhenidah Light Railway
- Platforms: 3
- Tracks: 4
- Train operators: Bangladesh Railway

Construction
- Structure type: Standard (on ground station)
- Parking: Yes
- Cycle facilities: Yes
- Accessible: Disabled access Computerized Ticketing Counters Luggage Checking System Food Plaza Kiosks WC Taxi Stand Public Transportation
- Architectural style: Modern

Other information
- Status: Functioning
- Station code: JS
- Zone(s): West Zone
- Division(s): Pakshi
- Classification: International/ Domestic

History
- Opened: 1884; 142 years ago
- Rebuilt: 2005 (21 years ago)

Services
Preceding station	Bangladesh Railway	Following station
Dhupkhola	Line; Jessore–Benapole Branch Line	Terminus
Jashore Cant.	Line; Darshana–Jessore–Khulna line	Rupdia
Terminus	Line; Dhaka–Jessore line	Rupdia
Terminus	Line; Jessore–Jhenidah Light Railway	Khoyertola
Location

Jashore Junction Railway Station (Bengali: যশোর জংশন রেলওয়ে স্টেশন) is a station in Jashore, Khulna Division, Bangladesh. The station is the main station of Jashore and is linked to Khulna, Dhaka and India by the Darshana-Jessore-Khulna Line.

== History ==
Its new station building was opened in 2005. On 8 March 2019 both governments agreed to make a 3-minute halt at Jessore in order to attract more passengers. The Bandhan Express now connects Khulna to Kolkata via Jessore.
