= Bhanga railway station =

Railway station in Faridpur, Bangladesh

Bhanga ভাঙ্গা
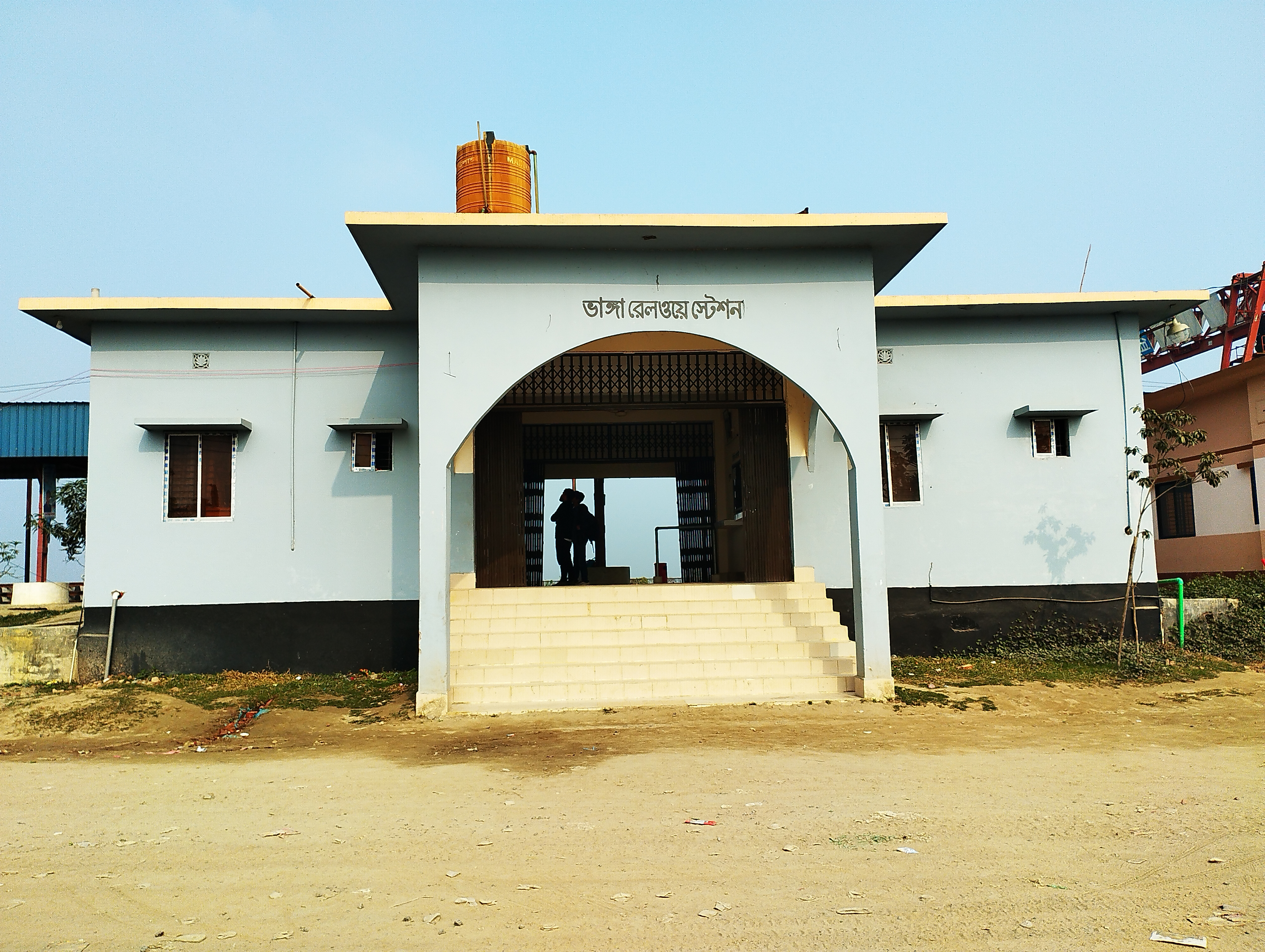

General information
- Location: Bhanga Upazila, Faridpur District; Bangladesh
- Coordinates: 23.3951545°N 89.9799373°E
- System: Bangladesh Railway Station
- Line: Pachuria–Bhanga line
- Platforms: 1
- Tracks: Broad Gauge

Construction
- Structure type: Standard (on ground station)

Other information
- Status: Functioning
- Station code: BHNGA
- Zone(s): West Zone
- Division(s): Pakshi

History
- Opened: 24 January 2020

Services
Preceding station	Bhanga railway station	Following station
Pukhuria	Line; Pachuria–Bhanga	Bhanga Junction
Location

Bhanga railway station is a railway station located in Bhanga Upazila, Faridpur District, Dhaka Division, Bangladesh.

== History ==
=== Railway line ===
Rajbari to Faridpur line was built in 1899. Nine railway stations situated in the railway line were closed on 16 September 1990. The railway line from Pachuria to Faridpur was closed by government on 26 March 1996. But that was not the first time the line was closed. It was stopped before 6 years of the second direction of closure. In 2013, Sheikh Hasina, prime minister of Bangladesh, ordered the reconstruction of the railway line. The Faridpur–Bhanga part of the Pachuria–Bhanga line was completed in 2019.

=== Station ===
Bhanga railway station was inaugurated and opened on 24 January 2020 by Md. Nurul Islam Sujon, railway minister of the country.
