= Dhaka–Jessore line =

Railway line in Bangladesh

Overview
- Native name: ঢাকা–যশোর রেলপথ
- Status: Operational
- Owner: Ministry of Railways
- Locale: Bangladesh
- Termini: Kamalapur railway station; Singia Junction railway station
- Stations: 18

Service
- Type: Broad Gauge Railway line
- System: Bangladesh Railway

History
- Opened: 24 December 2024; 11 months ago

Technical
- Line length: 172 km
- Track gauge: Broad gauge; Dual gauge; 1,676 mm (5 ft 6 in)
- Operating speed: 120 km/h
- Highest elevation: 11 metre

The Dhaka–Jessore line is a 172 km (107 mi) long broad gauge railway in Bangladesh. It was being constructed under the Ministry of Railways. The line connects the capital of Bangladesh to Jessore via Dhaka District, Narayanganj District, Munshiganj District, Shariatpur District, Madaripur District, Faridpur District, Gopalganj District, Bangladesh, and Narail District. It is a project related to Padma Bridge.

== Project ==
The railway connection project of Padma Bridge brings Bangladesh's regions of Faridpur and northern Jessore onto the railway network. The first phase includes the construction of a 172 km long broad gauge line from Dhaka to Jessore. According to the schedule of the authority, the Padma Bridge Rail link project will be completed in 2024. Including the railway-related works over the bridge of Padma, the primary estimated budget of the project was ৳39,246 crore. In this project, the Bangladeshi government is financing ৳18,210 crores, the remaining ৳21,036 crores will be financed by China. Later the budget was increased by ৳1,177 crore.

== Route ==
According to the sources of the project authority, the proposed line starts from Gendaria in Dhaka. It passes through the districts of Narayanganj, Munshiganj, Madaripur, Shariatpur, Faridpur, and Gopalganj of Dhaka Division, Narail and end at Jessore of Khulna Division. The route is divided into four sections for the construction process. The first section includes a double line of dual gauge railway from Kamalapur to Gandaria. The second section, which includes four railway stations, is a 36 km long single broad gauge line from Gandaria to Mawa. The next section, another single broad gauge line, is a 42 km long stretch that starts from Mawa and ends at Bhanga Junction. The section has five railway stations. The last section of the project is an 86 km broad gauge single line. From Bhanga to Rupdia, there will be ten railway stations. The Dhaka–Jessore line is a 172 km railway including 22 km viaduct line and the project authority is building 14 railway stations, excluding six realigned railway stations.

== Planning ==
The plan of the railway project consists of the construction of a line 11 meters above the ground, a 43 km long loop, bridges and culverts, 30 level crossings, 40 underpasses, etc. The project was scheduled to run from 1 January 2016 to 30 June 2024.

== Construction ==
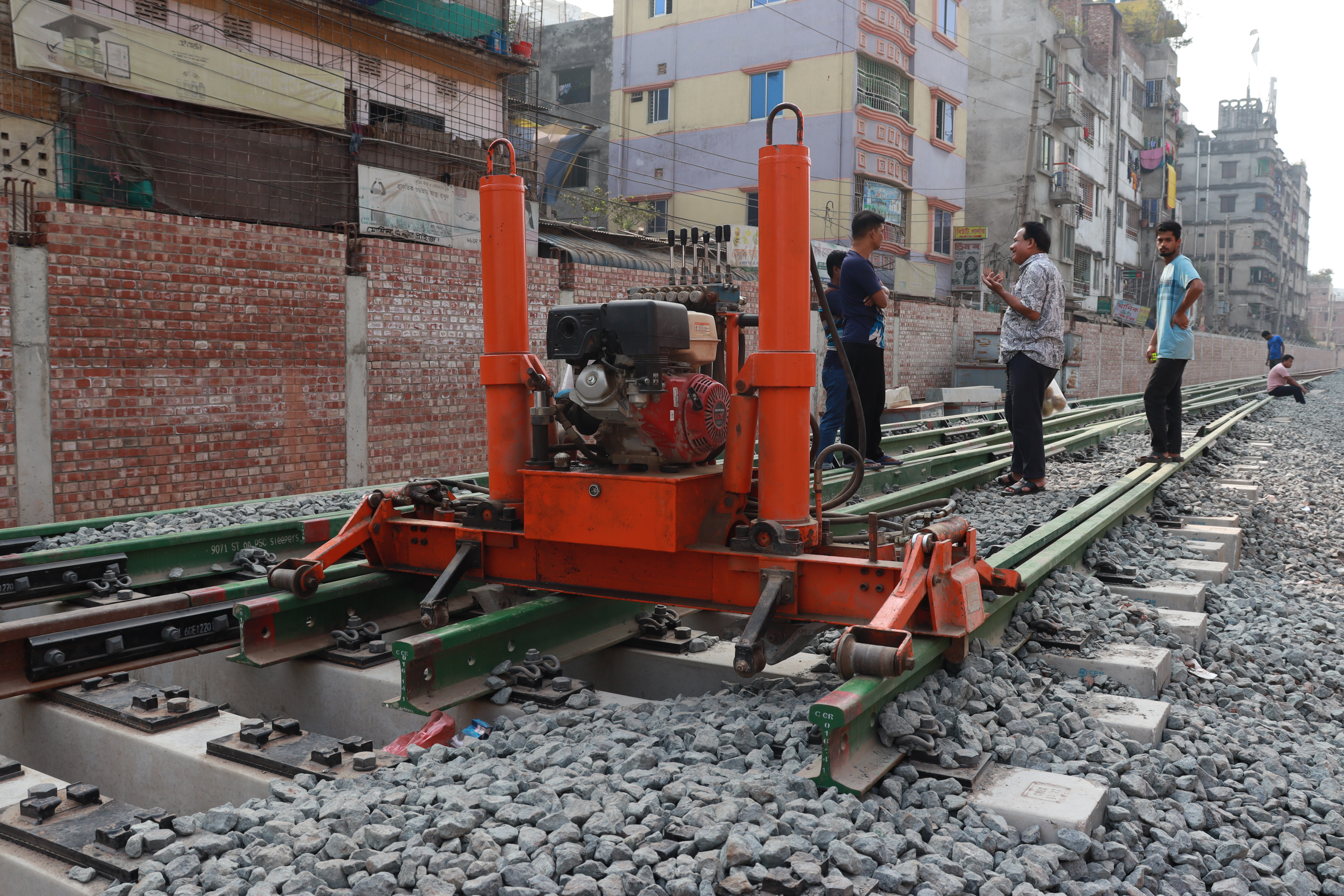
Construction of the Dhaka–Jessore line in Dhaka

In 2018, the railway construction of this line, covering 40 km on both sides of the river bridge on Padma, began. However, due to the lack of permission, it was not possible to install the railway on the bridge. On 17 July 2022, permission was given to lay railway tracks on the Padma Bridge. As of May 2022, 60% of the construction of 81 km of the line is complete. On 29 March 2023, the laying of the railway track over the Padma bridge, over which the line would run, was completed. The construction of the Bhanga–Jessore section was inaugurated on 10 June 2023.

== Trials and operation ==
On 4 April 2023, after completing 42 km of the line, a train was run from Bhanga to Padma Bridge on a trial basis. Another trial from Gandaria to Mawa was done on 19 August 2023. It is scheduled to open the first section in September 2023 and the second section of the line in June 2024.

== Stations ==
Railway stations on the Dhaka–Jessore line are mentioned below:

=== Phase 1 (44 km) ===
- Kamalapur railway station
- Gandaria railway station (connects Narayanganj–Bahadurabad Ghat line)
- Keraniganj railway station
- Nimtala railway station
- Sreenagar railway station
- Mawa railway station

=== Phase 2 (42 km) ===
- Zajira railway station
- Shibchar railway station
- Bhanga Junction railway station (connects Pachuria–Bhanga and Bhanga–Kuakata line)

=== Phase 3 (86 km) ===
- Nagarkanda railway station
- Muksudpur railway station
- Maheshpur railway station
- Kashiani Junction railway station (connects Kalukhali–Gobra line and Bhatiapara Ghat)
- Lohagara railway station
- Narail railway station
- Jamdia railway station
- Padmabila Junction railway station
- Rupdia railway station (to Darshana–Khulna line)
- Singia Junction railway station (to Darshana–Khulna line)
