= Bhanga–Kuakata line =

Railway line in Bangladesh

Overview
- Native name: ভাঙ্গা–কুয়াকাটা রেলপথ
- Status: Planned
- Owner: Bangladesh Railway
- Locale: Bangladesh
- Termini: Bhanga Junction railway station; Kuakata railway station
- Stations: 19

Service
- Type: Railway line
- Operator(s): West Zone

History
- Planned opening: 2030; 5 years' time

Technical
- Line length: 215 km (134 mi)
- Track gauge: Broad-gauge 1,676 mm (5 ft 6 in)
- Operating speed: 80 km/h

The Bhanga–Kuakata line is a planned railway line in Bangladesh to connect Bhanga with the beach city of Kuakata in Patuakhali. It is planned to build by 2030. It will also connect Barisal Division to the rest of Bangladesh.

== History ==
The Padma Bridge Rail Link Project brought South and Southwestern regions of Bangladesh under the railway network. In the first phase, an initiative was taken to construct a broad gauge railway spanning 172 km (107 mi) from Dhaka's Kamalapur to Jessore in the southwestern district. On 9 October 2016, permission was given to build a railway from Faridpur's Bhanga Junction railway station to Port of Payra. Later, the project was extended from Payra to Kuakata. Construction was to start in 2022 with deadline in 2030. The feasibility study proposal along with detailed design was approved by the Planning Minister on 9 October 2016. A consulting contract was signed on 19 June 2018.

In 2019, a joint venture of South Korea's Doha, Spain's TIPSA and Bangladeshi consulting firm DDC was tasked with the feasibility study of the project. After the feasibility study was completed in 2021, it was revealed that 5,638 acres of land would have to be acquired for the construction of the railway. It was also learned that the proposed railway might be an electrified broad gauge double line with a potential construction cost of ৳42,000 crore.

On 5 April 2022, the proposal for the railway project was submitted to the Economic Relations Division to get potential investors in public–private partnership and to the Bangladesh Planning Commission to get government funds. After the meeting held on 22 October 2023, the Bangladesh Planning Commission sent back its proposal advising to suspend the project for the time being considering the economic situation of the country. As of 2024, Economic Relations Division has not been found no foreign investors for the project, so there is uncertainty about its implementation. In May 2024, the railway minister said that the soil of Barisal Division is unsuitable for railway construction, so the entire line has to be elevated. On 3 July 2024, Export–Import Bank of China in a meeting with ERD expressed interest in lending for the proposed railway line.
