= Bogra–Sirajganj line =

Bangladesh

Overview
- Native name: বগুড়া–সিরাজগঞ্জ রেলপথ
- Status: Proposed
- Owner: Ministry of Railways
- Locale: Bangladesh
- Termini: Bogura railway station/Kahalu railway station; Shaheed Mansur Ali railway station
- Stations: 11

Service
- Type: Railway line
- System: Bangladesh Railway
- Operator: Bangladesh Railway

History
- Planned opening: 2031

Technical
- Line length: 86 km
- Track gauge: Dual gauge 1,676 mm (5 ft 6 in)
- Operating speed: 130 km/h

Bogra–Sirajganj line is a proposed 86 km dual gauge railway. It will be constructed under the Ministry of Railways, Government of Bangladesh. The line will directly connect Bogra District to Sirajganj District.

== History ==
The railway connection between Dhaka and Bogra, runs through Natore and Pabna District, increasing both travel time and distance required to travel by train. In 2005, the government took up a plan to build a railway line between Jamtoil, Sirajganj District and Bogra to save time and money for passengers. After the World Bank agreed to finance the railway line project, a survey on land acquisition was carried out, but the project was stopped due to political and business opposition. In 2011, the construction of Bogra–Sirajganj line was promised by Sheikh Hasina, but for unknown reasons, the construction was not started within four years. In the next year, she promised to build the railway for a second time as a result of public backlash against the lack of progress in the construction, but the project stalled as the government could not secure its financing. Then in 2017, the project officially started as the Government of India announced to provide a loan to finance the project. On 27 September 2021, the government of Bangladesh appointed a joint venture led by RITES Limited as the consultant for the project. Executive Committee of the National Economic Council approved the project on 30 October 2018. SMEC International submitted their pre-survey in 2010 after getting pre-survey responsibility for the railway project. In that pre-survey they proposed two routes. But within twelve years the routes were abandoned even as settlements developed on them. In 2022, the new consulting firm proposed four routes. Md. Nurul Islam Sujon, the railway minister, chose the third route out of the four which, if implemented, would end the railway at a distance of 3 km from the city rather than directly connecting Sirajganj to Bogra. In 14 November of the same year, a project related meeting in Bogra revealed that an allocation of ৳190 crore has been made in the financial year 2022-2023 for 944 acres land acquisition for the proposed railway line next year. 4 junctions and 7 stations are proposed on the planned route. This includes the conversion of existing Bogra and Kahalu railway stations into railway junctions, with the construction of a third junction at Ranirhat. From Ranirhat, the railway will pass through Ariyabazar, Sherpur, Chandaikona, Sonka Raiganj, Krishandia and Sirajganj Junctuob railway stations and end at Shaheed Mansur Ali station. In 2023, the government allocated a total of ৳1,921 crores for ongoing land acquisition. The project was scheduled to be completed by 2031.
