= Teesta Junction–Kurigram–Chilmari line =

Teesta Junction–Kurigram–Chilmari Line

Overview
- Status: Active
- Owner: Bangladesh Railway
- Locale: Bangladesh
- Termini: Teesta Railway Station; Ramna Bazar Railway Station

Service
- Type: Railway line in Bangladesh

Technical
- Line length: 56 kilometers
- Track gauge: Meter gauge 1,000 mm (3 ft 3 3/8 in)
- Operating speed: 40

The Teesta Junction–Kurigram–Chilmari Railway Line is a railway line maintained and operated by Bangladesh Railway.

== History ==
In 1879, a branch of the Burimari–Lalmonirhat–Parbatipur Line extended from Teesta Junction to Kurigram. Initially, it was a narrow gauge line. The line from Teesta Junction to Kurigram was converted to meter gauge in 1928–1929. In 1967, a new 28.55-kilometer meter-gauge railway was constructed from Kurigram to Chilmari. However, in the early 1970s, the Chilmari Railway Station was washed away by the Brahmaputra River due to flooding. Currently, trains only operate up to Ramna Bazar Railway Station. The railway line from Teesta Junction to Ramna Bazar is 56 kilometers long.

== List of stations ==
There are 9 railway stations on the Teesta Junction–Chilmari line. The names of the stations are listed below:

- Teesta Junction Railway Station
- Singer Dabrihat Railway Station
- Rajarhat Railway Station
- Togoraihat Railway Station
- Kurigram Railway Station
- Panchpir Railway Station
- Ulipur Railway Station
- Balabari Railway Station
- Ramna Bazar Railway Station

Closed Station:

- Old Kurigram Railway Station

Stations lost to the river:

- Chilmari Railway Station
