= Janalihat–Kaptai line =

Proposed railway line in Bangladesh

Overview
- Status: Proposed
- Owner: Bangladesh Railway
- Locale: Bangladesh
- Termini: Janalihat railway station; Kaptai railway station
- Stations: 9

Service
- Type: Railway line
- Operator(s): East Zone

Technical
- Line length: 42 km
- Track gauge: Dual gauge

Janalihat–Kaptai line is a proposed railway line in Chittagong Division, Bangladesh.

== History ==
Bangladesh Railway Master Plan was prepared in 2016. According to that master plan, there is a plan to establish a railway from Chittagong to Kaptai in Rangamati District by 2022. The feasibility study of the proposed railway line was conducted in 2019. In 2021, the Ministry of Railways officially started work on the railway project, which is scheduled to be completed by 2026. The budget of the 42.17 km railway has been fixed at ৳8,926 crore of which ৳1,785 crore will be provided by the government from its own revenue. In 2022, A.B.M. Fazle Karim Chowdhury, chairman of the Parliamentary Standing Committee on Railways, said that they expect the construction of the railway line sooner.
