= Pachuria–Bhanga line =

Railway line in Bangladesh

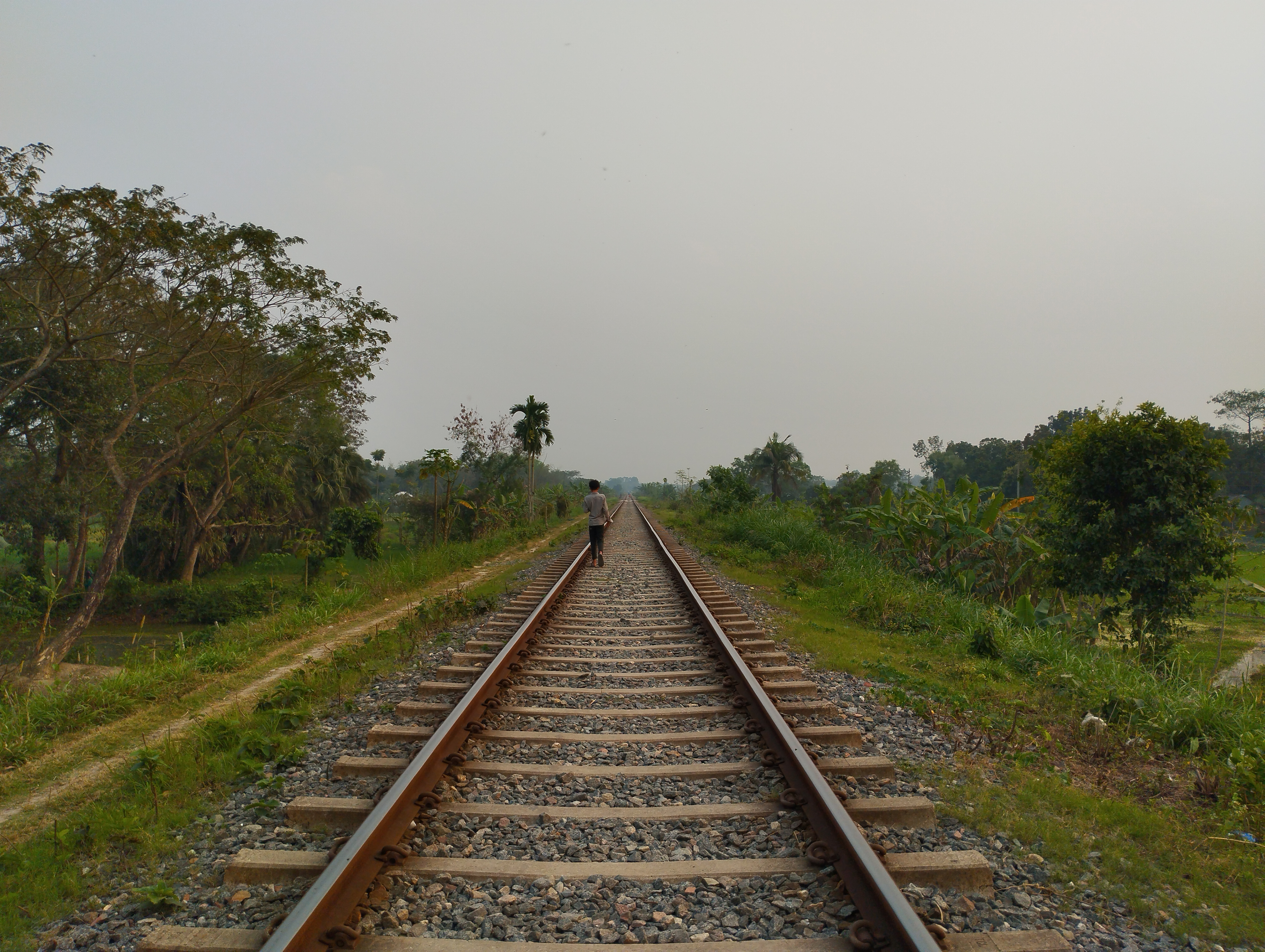

Overview
- Status: Functioning
- Owner: Bangladesh Railway
- Locale: Bangladesh
- Termini: Pachuria Junction railway station; Bhanga Junction railway station
- Stations: 12

Service
- Type: Railway line in Bangladesh

History
- Opened: Rajbari–Faridpur (opened 1899, rebuilt 2014); Faridpur–Bhanga (26 January 2020)

Technical
- Line length: 62 km
- Track gauge: Broad-gauge 1,676 mm (5 ft 6 in)
- Operating speed: 80 km/h

Pachuria–Bhanga line is a broad-gauge railway of Bangladesh Railway. The line is maintained and operated by West Zone.

== History ==
The first railway from Rajbari to Faridpur was built in 1899. Then, Bangladesh Railway closed the 34 km long Rajbari–Faridpur line on 15 March, 1998 because it was facing mismanagement and losses. Later, due to the demands of the people of Faridpur region, the authority started the new work of the line from 10 March, 2010. They reconstructed the line with 5 local railway stations were for 4 years at a cost of ৳90 crore. Rajbari–Faridpur rail connection was then experimentally reopened on 7 August 2014 with the running of an inter-city train. Later the government decided to open the existing 30 km railway line from Faridpur railway station to Bhanga railway station. The railway line was extended to Bhanga Junction. New railway line to Bhanga was launched on 26 January 2020 through Rajbari Express.

== Stations ==
- Pachuria Junction railway station
- Khankhanapur railway station
- Basantapur railway station
- Amirabad railway station
- Ambikapur railway station
- Faridpur railway station
- Faridpur College railway station
- Bakhunda railway station
- Talma railway station
- Pukhuria railway station
- Bhanga railway station
- Bhanga Junction railway station
