= Jessore–Jhenaidah Light Railway =

Railway line in Bangladesh

Overview
- Status: Dismantled
- Locale: Bangladesh
- Termini: Jessore Junction railway station; Jhenaidah railway station
- Stations: 14

Service
- Type: Light rail
- Operator(s): During British rule:-: 1. Eastern Bengal Railway (EBR) = 1913 - 1942 2. Bengal and Assam Railway (B&AR) = 1942 -1947; During Pakistan rule:- 1. Eastern Bengal Railway (EBR) = 1947 - 1961: 2. Pakistan Eastern Railway = (1961 - 1969)

History
- Opened: 1913; 113 years ago
- Closed: 1969; 57 years ago

Technical
- Track gauge: Narrow-gauge 762 mm (2 ft 6 in)
- Operating speed: 47 km/h (29 mph)

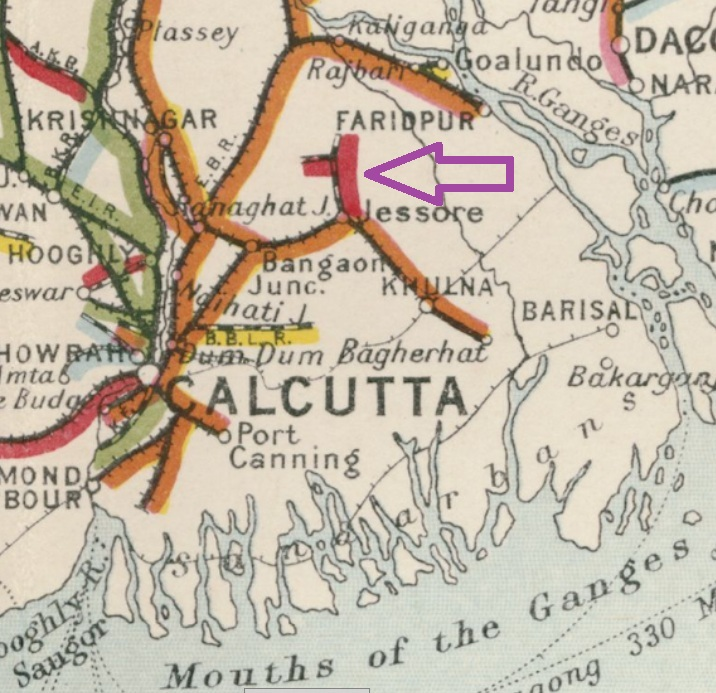
Jessore–Jhenidah Light Railway (Imperial Gazetteer of India, 1931, Railways & Inland Navigation)

The Jessore–Jhenaidah Light Railway was a 29-mile-long (47 km) 2 ft 6 in (762 mm) narrow gauge railway in British India, now in Bangladesh. It was constructed in 1913, and was dismantled in 1969. It operated 0-4-4T, 0-6-2T, 2-4-0T, and 0-8-0T locomotives of mostly German manufacture. The railway developed a reputation for being poorly managed, an official report in 1915 states that staff could not nominate one person as their manager.

== Stations ==
- Jessore Junction railway station
- Khayertola railway station
- Churamonkati railway station
- Haibatpur railway station
- Muradgarh railway station
- Mithapukuria railway station
- Pirojpur railway station
- Dulalmundia railway station
- Shibnogor Junction railway station
- Prasannanagar railway station
- Bishaikhali railway station
- Jhenaidah railway station

== Kotchandpur Branch (7.75 Mile) ==
- Shibnogor Junction railway station
- Ghigiti railway station
- Kotchandpur railway station

== Rolling stock ==
In 1936, the company owned seven locomotives, one railcar, 31 coaches and 69 goods wagons.

== Classification ==
It was labeled as a Class III railway according to Indian Railway Classification System of 1926.
