= Nabharan–Munshiganj line =

Proposed railway line in Bangladesh

Overview
- Native name: নাভারন–মুন্সিগঞ্জ রেলপথ
- Status: Proposed
- Owner: Bangladesh Railway
- Locale: Bangladesh
- Termini: Nabharan railway station; Munshiganj railway station
- Stations: 9

Service
- Type: Railway line
- Operator(s): West Zone

Technical
- Line length: 98.42 km (61.16 mi)
- Track gauge: Broad-gauge 1,676 mm (5 ft 6 in)
- Operating speed: 80 km/h

The Nabharan–Munshiganj line is a proposed railway line in Bangladesh to connect Nabharan in Jessore District with Munshiganj in Satkhira District.

== History ==
In 2010, the then prime minister Sheikh Hasina, while addressing a political public meeting organized in Shyamnagar Upazila of Satkhira District, promised the people to connect Satkhira District with Jessore District through a railway line. After making the promise, the government started survey activities for the project, but for unknown reasons, the work on the project stalled. As of 2020, the estimated budget of the proposed railway was ৳166.224 billion and 80% of the money was asked to China as loan. The construction period was estimated from 2020 to 4 years. On 12 May 2022, Satkhira's Cultural Society sent a memorandum to the prime minister demanding the implementation of the project. On 15 January 2023, the Jatiya Sangsad gave in-principle approval for the construction of the line. On the same day, the railway minister Md. Nurul Islam Sujon said that the government is looking for investors to implement the project.
