= Kashiani Upazila =

Kashiani কাশিয়ানী
- Upazila
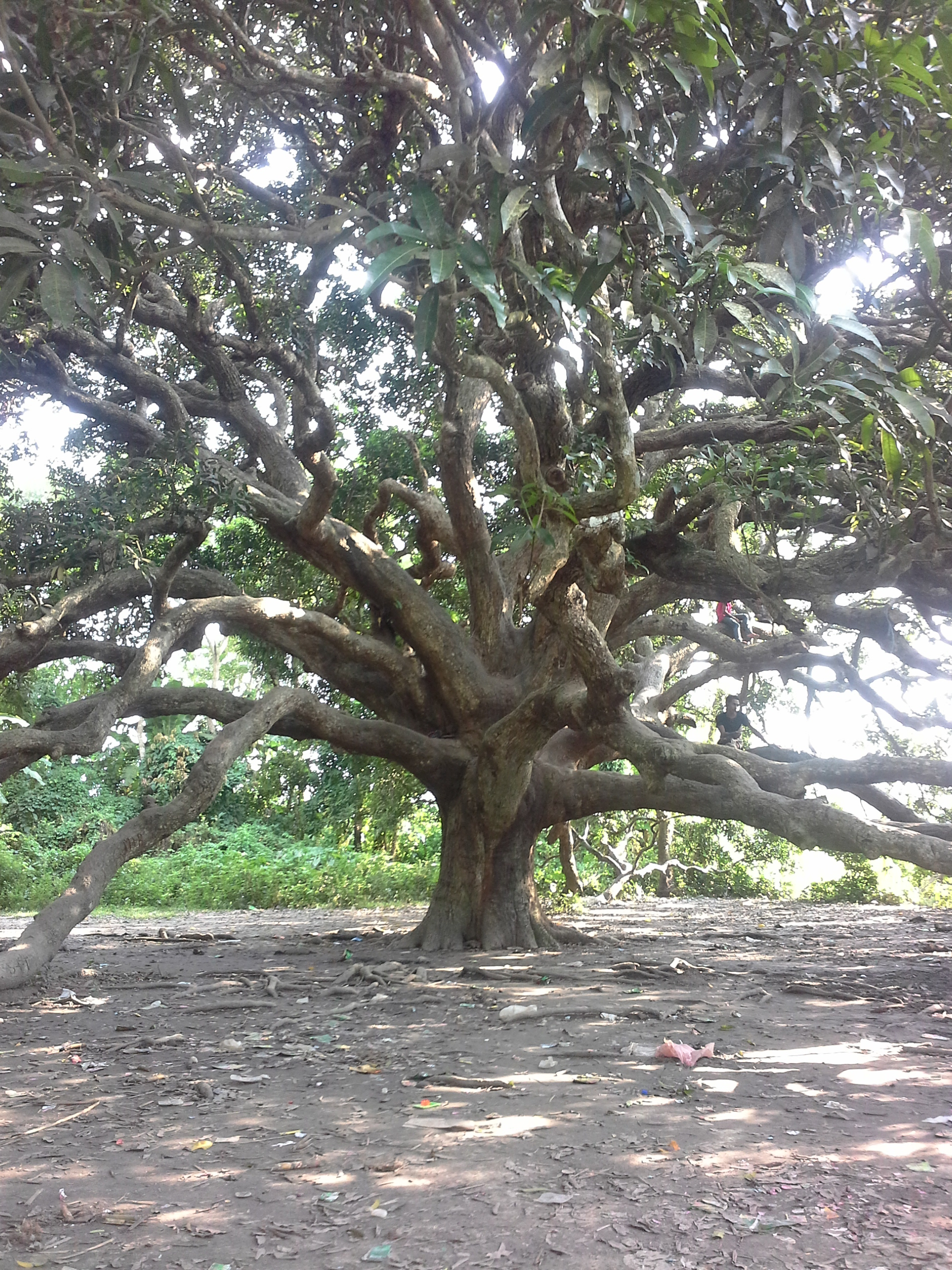
- A 100 year old mango tree located in Kashiani Upazila

- Coordinates: 23°13′N 89°42′E
- Country: Bangladesh
- Division: Dhaka
- District: Gopalganj

Area
  - Total: 286.31 km^{2} (110.54 sq mi)

Population (2022)
  - Total: 228,161
  - Density: 796.90/km^{2} (2,064.0/sq mi)
- Time zone: UTC+6 (BST)
- Postal code: 8130
- Area code: 06652
- Website: kashiani.gopalganj.gov.bd

Kashiani (Bengali: কাশিয়ানী) is an upazila of Gopalganj District in the Division of Dhaka, Bangladesh.

Kashiani Upazila mauza geocode map

== Geography ==
Kashiani is located at 23.2167°N 89.7000°E. It has a total area 286.31 km^{2}.

== Demographics ==
Historical population
Year	Pop. (000)	±%
1981	204	—
1991	206	+1.0%
2001	229	+11.2%
2011	208	−9.2%
2022	228	+9.6%
Source: Bangladesh Bureau of Statistics

According to the 2022 Bangladeshi census, Kashiani Upazila had 55,915 households and a population of 228,161. 9.74% of the population were under 5 years of age. Kashiani had a literacy rate (age 7 and over) of 77.79%: 79.38% for males and 76.33% for females, and a sex ratio of 93.42 males for every 100 females. 20,556 (9.01%) lived in urban areas.

Religions in Kashiani Upazila (2022)
Religion	Percent
Islam	82.73%
Hinduism	17.21%
Other or not stated	0.06%

Population by religion in Union
Union	Muslim	Hindu	Others
Bethuri Union	7,530	5,138	8
Fukra Union	21,622	2,193	6
Hatiara Union	2,927	4,926	0
Kashiani Union	29,639	3,117	51
Maheshpur Union	33,004	2,479	31
Mamudpur Union	6,517	3,999	3
Nijamkandi Union	8,861	1,970	4
Orakandi Union	12,622	2,138	14
Parulia Union	8,038	1,225	1
Puishur Union	4,886	1,698	7
Rajpat Union	11,177	1,736	2
Ratail Union	23,238	1,607	10
Sajail Union	18,686	817	5
Singa Union	3	6,218	2

🟩 Muslim majority 🟧 Hindu majority

According to the 2011 Census of Bangladesh, Kashiani Upazila had 46,335 households and a population of 207,615. 49,583 (23.88%) were under 10 years of age. Kashiani had a literacy rate (age 7 and over) of 59.22%, compared to the national average of 51.8%, and a sex ratio of 1078 females per 1000 males. 5,352 (2.58%) lived in urban areas.

== Administration ==
Kashiani Upazila is divided into 14 union parishads: Bethuri, Hataira, Kashiani, Mahespur, Mamudpur, Nijamkandi, Orakandi, Parulia, Puisur, Pukra, Rajpat, Ratoil, Sajail and Singa. The union parishads are subdivided into 151 mauzas and 162 villages.

Chairman: Mukter Hoshen Vice Chairman: Jaminur Rahaman Japan Woman Vice Chairman: Minazaman

Upazila Nirbahi Officer (UNO): A.S.M. Myeenuddin

Kasiani News Paper- 1 : Weekly Kasiani Barta. Editor : Hanif Mahmud (Publish 8 June 2014)Publish by Hanif Mahmud from Bismilla Ofset Press, Kasiani.

== See also ==
- Upazilas of Bangladesh
- Districts of Bangladesh
- Divisions of Bangladesh
