= Kalukhali–Gobra line =

Railway line in Bangladesh

Overview
- Native name: কালুখালী–গোবরা রেলপথ
- Status: Operational
- Owner: Ministry of Railways
- Locale: Bangladesh
- Termini: Kalukhali Junction railway station; Gobra railway station
- Stations: 18

Service
- Type: Railway line in Bangladesh
- System: Bangladesh Railway

History
- Opened: 1932 (Kalukhali–Bhatiapara Ghat); 2018 (Kashiani–Gobra)

Technical
- Line length: 137 km
- Track gauge: Broad gauge 1,676 mm (5 ft 6 in)
- Operating speed: 80 km/h

The Kalukhali–Gobra line is a 137km-long broad gauge railway. It was constructed under the Ministry of Railways, Government of Bangladesh. The line connects Rajbari District to Gopalganj District. It is operated by West Zone and according to the engineering department of Bangladesh Railway, it has been identified as a high-grade railway line.

== History ==
The railway line was constructed from Kushtia to Goalundo Ghat on 1 January, 1871 during British rule. As a branch of this line, the railway line from Kalukhali in Rajbari District to Bhatiapara Ghat in Gopalganj District was started in 1932. Later it was closed in 1997 due to losses. On 2 November, 2013, Sheikh Hasina, the prime minister of the country, inaugurated the Kalukhali–Bhatiapara section renovated at a cost of ৳320.85 crore and launched the Bhatiapara Express. In November 2015, the construction of the Kashiani–Gobra section started. The construction of this 44 km long railway section at a cost of ৳258 crore was completed in October 2018. The new railway line was launched on 1 November 2018 with the launch of the Tungipara Express train.

== Branch lines ==
=== Bhatiapara Ghat ===
The railway section from Kalukhali to Bhatiapara ghat was constructed in 1932 as a branch of the Poradah–Goalundo Ghat line built in 1871.

=== Kamarkhali Ghat ===
This railway section was established from Kalukhali Ghat in Rajbari District to Bhatiapara Ghat. Another Madhukhali–Kamarkhali Ghat branch was constructed at the same time. But this branch line was later discontinued due to damage during 1971 liberation war. In 2018, the government announced the construction of a broad gauge railway branch line from Madhukhali to Magura via Kamarkhali Ghat.
