= Singia Junction railway station =

Railway station in Bangladesh

Singia Junction সিঙ্গিয়া জংশন

General information
- Location: Jashore–Khulna Highway, Jashore Sadar Upazila, Jashore District; Bangladesh
- Coordinates: 23.1214°N 89.3469°E
- Owner: Bangladesh Railway
- Lines: Darshana–Jessore–Khulna line Dhaka–Jessore line
- Platforms: 3
- Tracks: 4

Construction
- Structure type: Standard (on ground station)
- Parking: Yes
- Cycle facilities: Yes
- Accessible: Disabled access Computerized Ticketing Counters Luggage Checking System Food Plaza Kiosks WC Taxi Stand Public Transportation

Other information
- Status: Opened
- Station code: SIN
- Zone(s): West Zone
- Division(s): Pakshi

History
- Opened: 1884; 142 years ago
- Rebuilt: 2024

Services
Preceding station	Bangladesh Railway	Following station
Padmabila Junction towards Kamalapur	Dhaka–Jessore	Terminus
Rupdia towards Darshana Junction	Darshana–Jessore–Khulna	Chengutia towards Khulna
Location

Singia Junction railway station (Bengali: সিঙ্গিয়া জংশন রেলওয়ে স্টেশন) is a railway station on the Darshana–Jessore–Khulna line. It was built in 1884. The Dhaka–Jessore line diverges here.
