= Rupdia railway station =

Railway station in Bangladesh

Rupdia রূপদিয়া
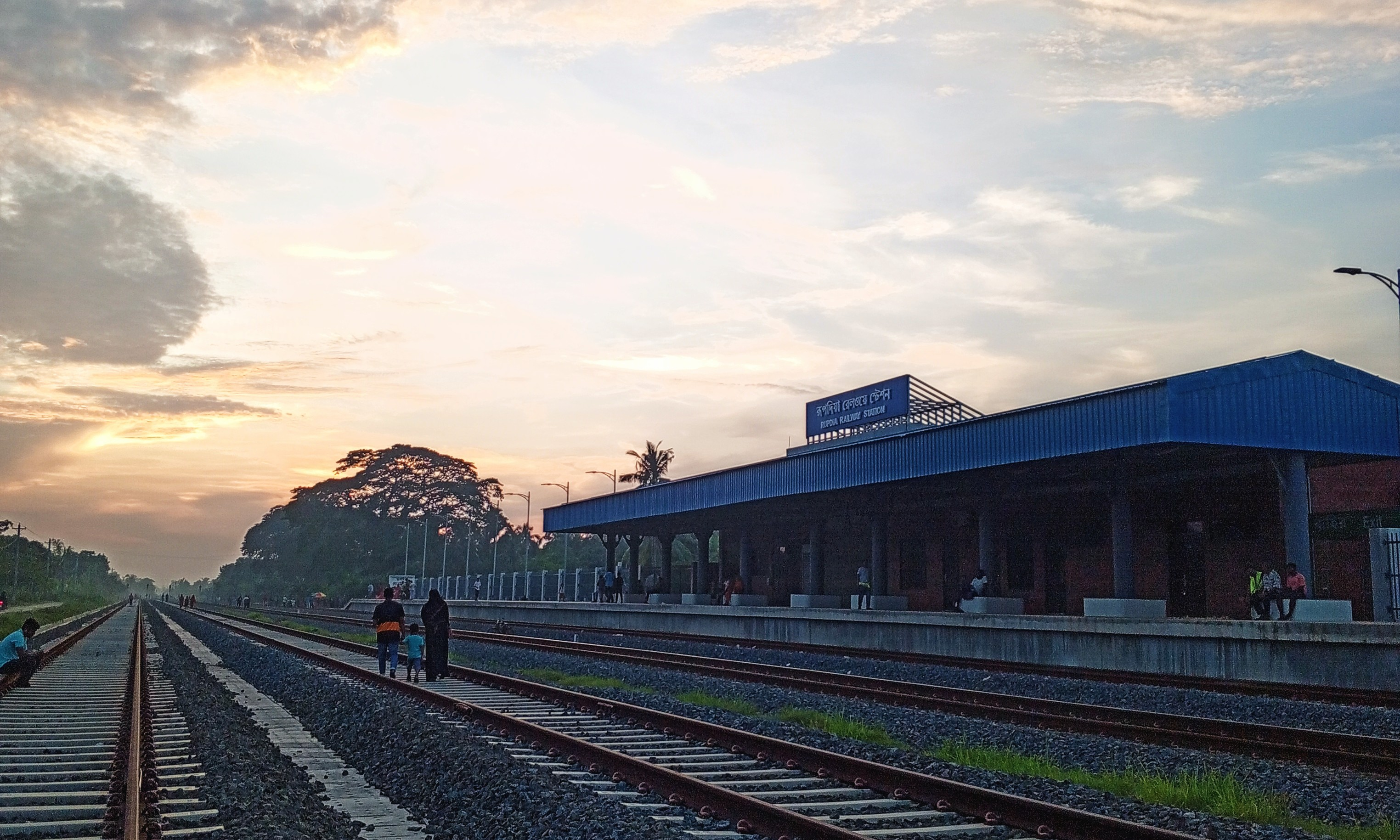

General information
- Location: Station Road, Rupdia Bazar, Jessore District; Bangladesh
- Coordinates: 23.125452°N 89.2866°E
- Owner: Bangladesh Railway
- Lines: Darshana–Jessore–Khulna line; Dhaka–Jessore line
- Platforms: 2
- Tracks: 3

Construction
- Structure type: Standard (on ground station)
- Parking: Yes
- Cycle facilities: Yes
- Accessible: Disabled access Computerized Ticketing Counters Luggage Checking System Food Plaza Kiosks WC Taxi Stand Public Transportation

Other information
- Status: Operational
- Station code: RDA
- Zone(s): West Zone
- Division(s): Pakshi

History
- Opened: 1884; 142 years ago

Services
Preceding station	Bangladesh Railway	Following station
Jessore Junction towards Darshana Junction	Darshana–Jessore–Khulna	Singia Junction towards Khulna
Padmabila Junction towards Kamalapur	Dhaka–Jessore	Terminus
Location

Rupdia Railway Station is a railway station on Dhaka–Jessore line located in Jessore Sadar Upazila, Jessore District, Bangladesh. It is one of four railway stations in the district constructed under Padma Bridge Rail Link project.

== History ==
To meet the growing demand for jute worldwide, there was a need for improved communication systems to supply jute from the major jute producing areas of Dhaka and Mymensingh to the port of Calcutta. For the reason, Bangaon–Jesore–Khulna broad gauge railway line known as Central Railway was constructed between 1882 and 1884. Rupdia railway station was constructed in 1884.

The permanent structure of this station was constructed around 1982. As of 2017, the ministry of Railways was constructing Dhaka–Jessore line under Padma Bridge rail link project. The station was demolished for reconstruction under the new railway line project.

As of 2018, a train stops at the railway station. There was no stationmaster at the station. As of 2023, the railway authorities have planned to make the station operational by appointing a stationmaster and pointsman at the station. In 2025, it was decided by the authorities to select the station as a train stop for the Mongla Commuter.
