= Padma Bridge =

Longest bridge in Bangladesh

Padma Bridge পদ্মা সেতু
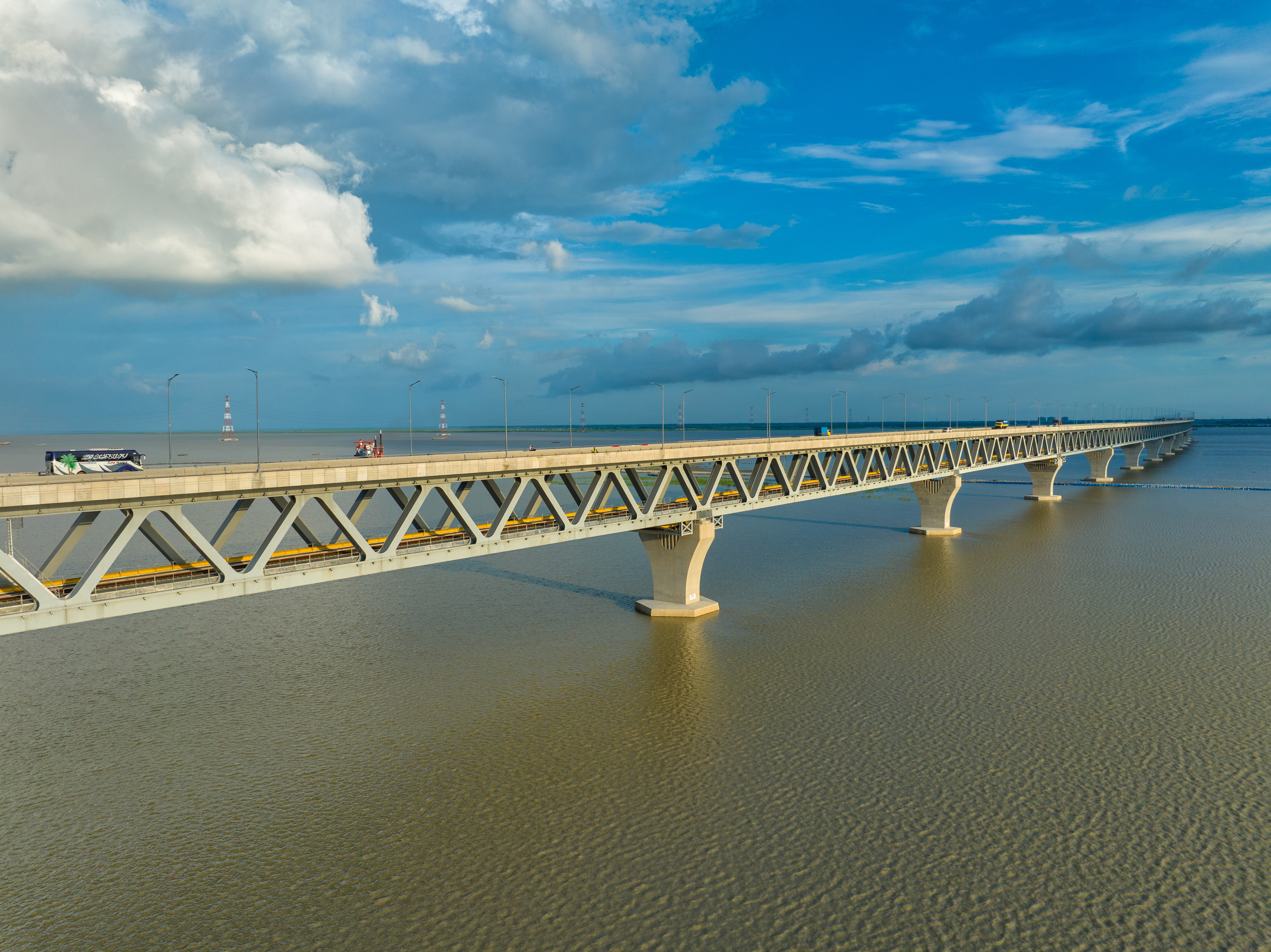
- Padma Bridge in July 2023
- Coordinates: 23.4443°N 90.2610°E
- Carries: Dhaka–Bhanga Expressway; Asian Highway 1 National Highway 8 Dhaka–Jashore Railway
- Crosses: Padma River
- Official name: Padma Multipurpose Bridge
- Named for: Padma River
- Owner: Bangladesh Bridge Authority
- Website: www.padmabridge.gov.bd
- Next upstream: Lalon Shah Bridge

Characteristics
- Design: double deck truss bridge
- Total length: 6.15 km (3.82 mi)
- Width: 18.10 m (59.4 ft)
- Height: 120 m (390 ft)
- Water depth: 29 m (95 ft)
- No. of spans: 41
- Load limit: 10,000 tonnes
- No. of lanes: 4

History
- Designer: AECOM
- Constructed by: China Major Bridge Engineering Co. Ltd.
- Construction start: 26 November 2014
- Construction end: 23 June 2022
- Construction cost: ৳301.93 billion (US$3.6 billion)
- Opened: 26 June 2022; 4 years ago
- Inaugurated: 25 June 2022

Statistics
- Toll: Yes

Location
- Interactive map of Padma Bridge

The Padma Multipurpose Bridge, (Note: Bengali: পদ্মা বহুমুখী সেতু, romanized: Pôdmā Bôhumukhī Sētu) commonly known as the Padma Bridge, (Note: Bengali: পদ্মা সেতু, romanized: Pôdmā Sētu) is a two-level road-rail bridge across the Padma River, the main distributary of the Ganges in Bangladesh.

It connects Louhajang Upazila of Munshiganj with Zazira Upazila of Shariatpur and a small part of Shibchar Upazila in Madaripur, linking the less developed southwest of the country to its northern and eastern regions. The bridge was inaugurated on 25 June 2022 by then-Prime Minister Sheikh Hasina.

The bridge is considered the most challenging construction project in the history of Bangladesh. The steel truss bridge carries a four-lane highway on the upper level and a single-track railway on the lower level. The bridge consists of 41 sections, each 150.12 m (492.5 ft) long and 22 metres (72 ft) wide, with a total length of 6.15 km (3.82 mi). It is the longest bridge in Bangladesh by both span and total length, and features the deepest pile depth of any bridge in the world at 127 m (417 ft). The construction of this bridge was deemed to be especially challenging due to specific constraints related to the width and depth of the Padma river.

The bridge was expected to boost the GDP of Bangladesh by up to 1.23 percent. The bridge connects 13 districts (of a total 21) to other regions of the country which have an above-average poverty rate. Following the inauguration of the bridge, economic activity in the southwestern regions was expected to be significantly boosted, with several big companies opening productions there prior to completion. 17 economic zones are planned at different places in the southwestern region.

The Padma Multipurpose Bridge generated approximately Tk. 800 crore (8 billion) through toll collection in its first year. Data analysis from the bridge department reveals that on average, more than 15,000 vehicles cross the bridge daily. To ensure convenient trips to other destinations by crossing the Padma Bridge, the government of Bangladesh has initiated numerous projects, including the Dhaka–Mawa–Bhanga Elevated Expressway, aimed at enhancing road connectivity.

== History ==
=== Background ===
The Daily Purbadesh reported in 1971 that a team of survey experts from Japan submitted a feasibility report for the construction of the Dhaka–Faridpur road to East Pakistan (now Bangladesh). As part of the construction of the road, they suggested building a bridge over the Padma River. After the independence of Bangladesh, Sheikh Mujibur Rahman, the first president of Bangladesh, announced the construction of a bridge over the Padma, but after 1975, the project was not implemented.

On 18 September 1998, a project worth Tk. 3,843.50 crore (38.435 billion) was proposed for the construction of a bridge over the Padma River on the Dhaka–Mawa–Bhanga–Khulna Highway with the aim of establishing direct communication between the capital and the south and southwest of the country. At 5 km long and 18.10 m wide, this bridge was considered to be the longest possible bridge in the country. Construction was proposed to begin in July 1999 and be completed in June 2004. In the proposed cost, Tk. 2,893.50 crore (28.935 billion) was from foreign sources and Tk. 750 crore (7.5 billion) was from local sources.

The foundation stone for the Padma Bridge was laid by Prime Minister Sheikh Hasina on 4 July 2001. However, the BNP, under the leadership of Khaleda Zia, returned to power following the 2001 general election and decided to discontinue the project. In the 2006–2007 Annual Development Program, the Bangladesh government readopted a plan to build the Padma Multipurpose Bridge. The Bangladesh Bridge Authority (BBA) invited the pre-qualification tender for the project in April 2010. Construction of the bridge was expected to commence by early 2011 and be ready for major completion in 2013 (and complete all sections by late 2015).

After allegations of corruption by some people associated with the project's preparation, the World Bank withdrew its commitment and other donors followed. The government of Bangladesh then decided to fund the project itself; it later considered foreign options from Malaysia, India, and China. Of these, China proposed building the bridge on a build-operate-transfer (BOT) basis by investing $2 billion, or 70 percent of the project cost. In June 2016, the Bangladesh government floated an international construction tender. Three international construction companies purchased the tender papers. However, only one—China Major Bridge Engineering Company Ltd—submitted a financial proposal, on 24 April 2014; the company was then selected on 17 June 2014 to construct the bridge.

Following the withdrawal of pledged funds by the World Bank, the project was ultimately funded directly by the Bangladesh government, with expenditures derived primarily from the central government budget.

=== Overview of project ===
Concept of the cross-section construction of the bridge

The detailed design of the Padma Multipurpose Bridge was delivered by a team of international and national consultants headed by AECOM. The team comprised AECOM, SMEC International, Northwest Hydraulic Consultants, and ACE Consultants, with additional assistance from Aas-Jakobsen and HR Wallingford.

The project comprised two phases: phase 1 included the design phase, procurement action, and award of construction contracts; phase 2 was the construction phase.

Phase 1 commenced on 29 January 2009. A dedicated project office was set up in Dhaka in March 2009. The detailed design of the main bridge was carried out in AECOM's Hong Kong office. All work by the design team was carried out within the framework of AECOM's Quality Management System (QMS), which is independently accredited to AS/NZS ISO 9001. The QMS is designed to control all project work undertaken by the team. A project-specific design management plan was established at the outset of the project. In March 2009, the government of Bangladesh requested AECOM to accelerate the design to complete construction by the end of 2013. This necessitated the mobilization of additional personnel within the design team. The Bangladesh Bridge Authority (BBA) established an internationally recognized panel of experts comprising five national and five international experts to review the design at regular intervals. In addition, an independent checking engineer, Flint & Neill, was engaged to review the design criteria, specifications, and drawings produced by the design team to ensure the design meets the project requirements and to undertake an independent check of the detailed design of the main bridge and river training works.

A key feature of the detailed design was the integration of Bangladesh counterparts into the design team, which allowed the successful training of a significant number of Bangladesh personnel in all aspects of the project and the subsequent transfer of the high level of technology involved in this large, complex project.

=== Construction and development ===
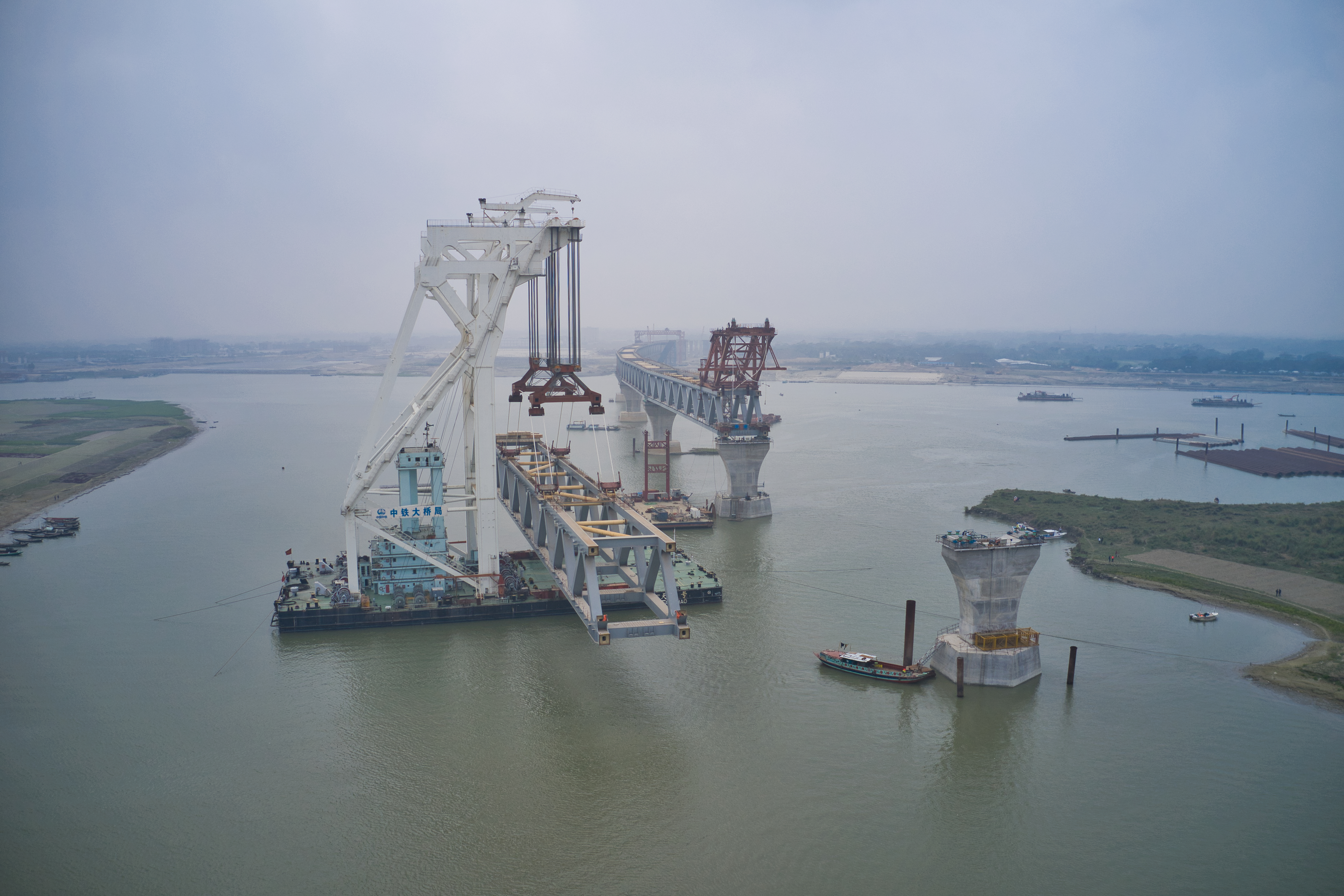
A truss of the Padma Bridge being lifted by Tian Yi Hao crane during construction

Work on the Padma Multipurpose Bridge was broadly divided into five parts: the main bridge, the river training, two link roads, and infrastructure (service area) construction. Construction of the main bridge was carried out by China Major Bridge Engineering Corporation. China's Sinohydro Corporation was appointed for the river training works while Bangladesh's Abdul Monem Limited was given the contract for the two link roads and infrastructure construction. The bridge is 6.15 kilometres long, with two tiers. It has a total of 42 pillars, each with six piles beneath. Steel spans were placed atop the pillars.

In October 2017, more than one and a half years after the main construction work began, the first span was installed between pillars 37 and 38, indicating timely progress on the project. As of May 2021, more than 95% of the construction (all the main steel frame spans were set on the piers) of the bridge had been completed. Construction of all 42 pillars was completed on 27 November 2020. The final (41st) span of the bridge was installed on 10 December 2020. The last road slab was installed on the span that linked pillars 12 and 13 on 24 August 2021.

=== Opening ===
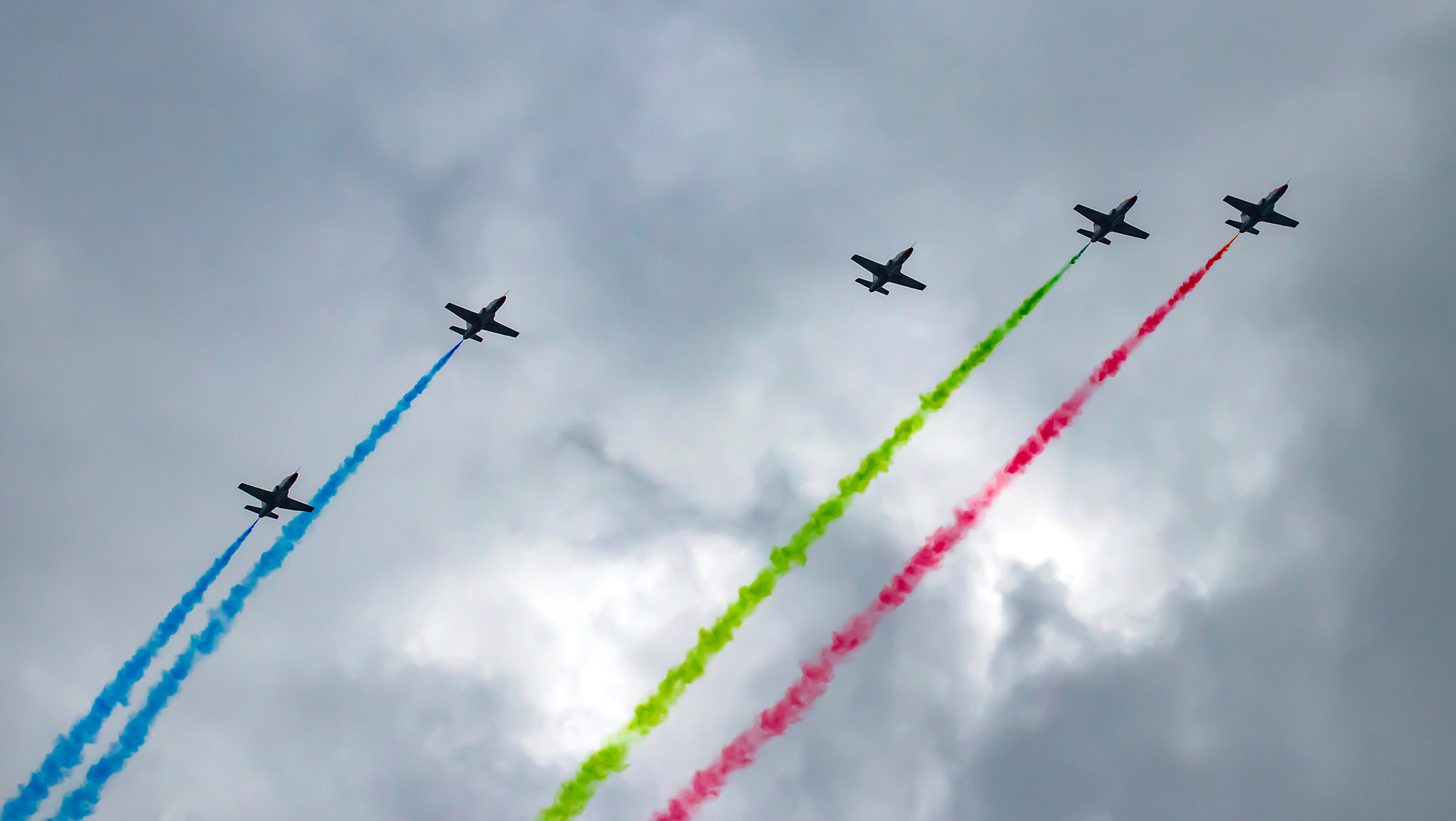
Bangladesh Air Force flypast during the opening ceremony of Padma Bridge

The Padma Bridge was officially inaugurated by then prime minister Sheikh Hasina, on 25 June 2022. An elaborate ceremony was conducted for the opening of bridge, signifying its national significance. Prime Minister Hasina unveiled a plaque at the Mawa point commemorating the construction of the bridge, followed by special prayers. After the inauguration, Hasina paid the first toll of the bridge, ৳750, and ৳16,400 for the rest of her fleet. The motorcade stopped while on the bridge and watched an aerobatics display conducted by the Bangladesh Air Force. Upon concluding the journey across the bridge, Hasina gave a keynote speech. A commemorative ৳100 note was released featuring an image of the bridge. Celebrations were held concurrently in the diplomatic missions of Bangladesh located around the world.

==== Toll and revenue ====
On 28 April 2022, the Bridges Division proposed a toll rate for the Padma Bridge and sent it to the prime minister for approval. On 17 May, the Ministry of Road Transport and Bridges issued a notification fixing different toll rates for different vehicles.

The construction cost of the Padma Bridge was Tk. 30,193.39 crore (301.93 billion). It was estimated that by 2022, the bridge would carry 21,300 vehicles per day in 23 districts of Bangladesh, which would increase to 41,600 by 2025. According to this traffic flow, it would take 9 1/2 years to recover through the toll the cost of the bridge. According to Jugantar, citing the World Bank, the revenue from the Padma Bridge in the next 31 years will be 18.5 billion dollars, which is 5.5 times the construction cost. In addition, social progress will add 25 billion dollars to the economy. The land that has been protected through river governance on both sides is worth about Tk. 1,400 crore (14 billion). The bridge will save Tk. 2,400 crore (24 billion) on electricity, gas, and Internet lines. The non-operation of the ferry will save Tk. 3,600 crore (36 billion). According to the agreement, the bridge authority will have to pay Tk. 36,000 crore (360 billion) in the next 35 years. According to the Bangladesh Bridge Authority, most of the money collected from the toll will be used to repay the loan, and the rest will be used to maintain the bridge.

On 26 June 2022, the first day the bridge was open to the public, a total of about 15,200 vehicles crossed the bridge in the first eight hours. According to an official from the Bangladesh Bridge Authority, a total toll of Tk. 82,19,000 was collected between 6 am to 2 pm. On 1 July 2022, the sixth day after the opening, the government earned a record Tk 3,16,00,000 in revenue through tolls from 26,394 vehicles that crossed the bridge.

== Controversy and rumours ==
From the beginning, the Padma Multipurpose Bridge negotiation was involved in controversy and conspiracy. The World Bank stated that they found "credible evidence corroborated by a variety of sources which points to a high-level corruption conspiracy among Bangladeshi government officials, SNC-Lavalin executives, and private individuals in connection with the Padma Multipurpose Bridge Project". As a result of the alleged corruption, the World Bank initially refused to sanction the proposed loan for constructing the bridge and imposed conditions for the continuation of loan talks with the government. In accordance with one of these conditions, Communications Minister Syed Abul Hossain had to resign, as he was alleged to have been involved in the corruption. SNC-Lavalin accepted a negotiated resolution agreement where the company and its affiliates were barred from taking part in bidding for World Bank contracts for 10 years. This is particularly significant, as one of the four criteria required before the international donor agrees to a negotiated settlement is "Whether an accused party has admitted culpability". Some assumed that SNC-Lavalin had done so.

However, the corruption allegations were thrown out in a Canadian court on a technicality as initial cause shown before wiretapping suspects was not deemed good enough. Hence, all evidence gathered from the wiretap was discarded. As the case heavily relied on the wiretap evidence, the prosecution decided not to pursue the case further.

In 2017, former ICC prosecutor Luis Gabriel Moreno Ocampo came to Dhaka to monitor the progress of the alleged Padma Multipurpose Bridge corruption investigation. The World Bank sent a panel of three, headed by Ocampo, to review the steps taken by the ACC in the investigation. As recommended by the panel, the ACC filed a case implicating former Bridges Division secretary Mosharraf Hossain Bhuiyan and six other high-ranking government officials. However, the same Canadian court acquitted three executives of charges that SNC-Lavalin staff had planned to bribe Bangladesh officials in the bridge project, on the same technicality mentioned earlier.

Rumours spread on social media platforms like Facebook that human heads would be required in the construction of the Padma Bridge in July 2019. Later, on 9 July 2019, the bridge construction authority sent a notification to the media stating that the incident was rumoured and baseless. Researchers advised the bridge authorities to spread all the details of the construction of the bridge among the people.

== Impact ==
Population density and wages in the southern districts (zilas) connected by the Padma Bridge to Dhaka city will increase significantly, and the bridge will help lessen the impact of sea level rise in the region, a World Bank report says. According to the CPD distinguished fellow, the size of GDP would increase by 1.23% with the opening of the Padma Bridge. The south-western districts will add another 2% to the GDP through the inauguration of factories and increased tourism, alongside an estimated 2–4% increase in wage and a 6–12% increase in population. It is estimated to give a US$500M boost to the commercial vehicle market of Bangladesh within five years of the bridge opening. Lives are also expected to be saved as critical patients of southwestern regions will be able to travel to Dhaka faster, avoiding hassles associated with travel by ferries, for better treatment facilities.

The Padma Bridge is forecast to help increase progressively the number of tourists each year in the southwestern districts, including twofold during the inaugurating year alone. Accordingly, the existing hotels in the region are forecast to earn higher profits. New hotel, motel, and rest-house businesses had been also coming to them for business consultancy, licensing, and other documentation services related to opening their tourism and hospitality businesses in the region. Hence, the bridge is expected to indirectly generate additional employment and revenues.

The bridge provides a faster connection between Dhaka and Kolkata (saving at least 2 hours of journey time), as well as between Dhaka and southern Bangladesh. The bridge's single rail line is run as part of the Dhaka–Jessore line and runs at a speed of 120 km/h, like the rest of the Mawa-Bhanga section. In 2022, it was suggested that once the bridge was operational, another Kolkata–Dhaka international train via Mawa, Goalando, Faridpur, Kushthia, Poradaho, Darshana, and Gede may be introduced. Tourist spots of southwestern Bangladesh like Kuakata, Sundarbans, and major destinations like Barisal, Faridpur, Gopalganj, Patuakhali, and Khulna are now easily reachable from Dhaka.

== Gallery ==
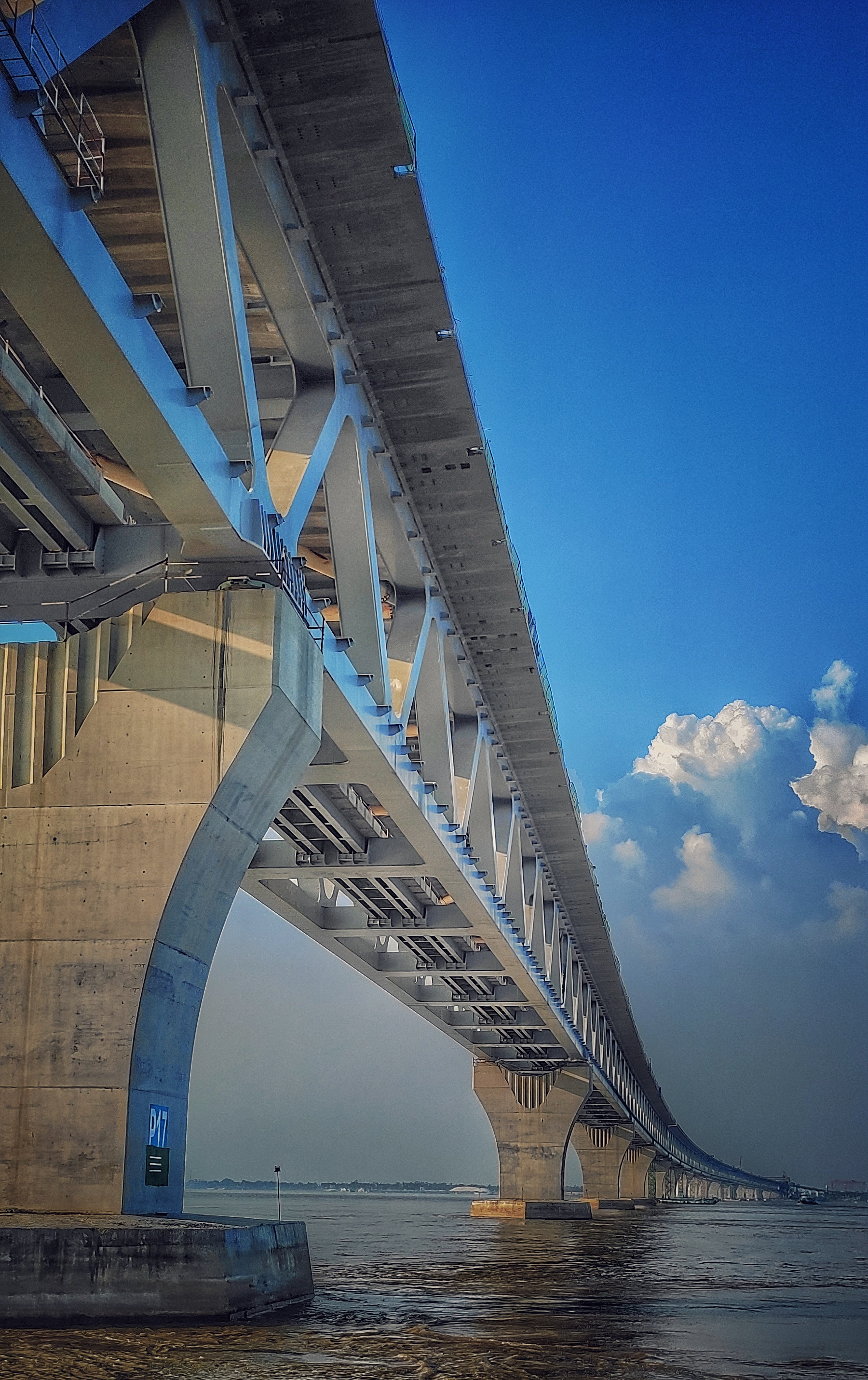
Construction site in September 2021

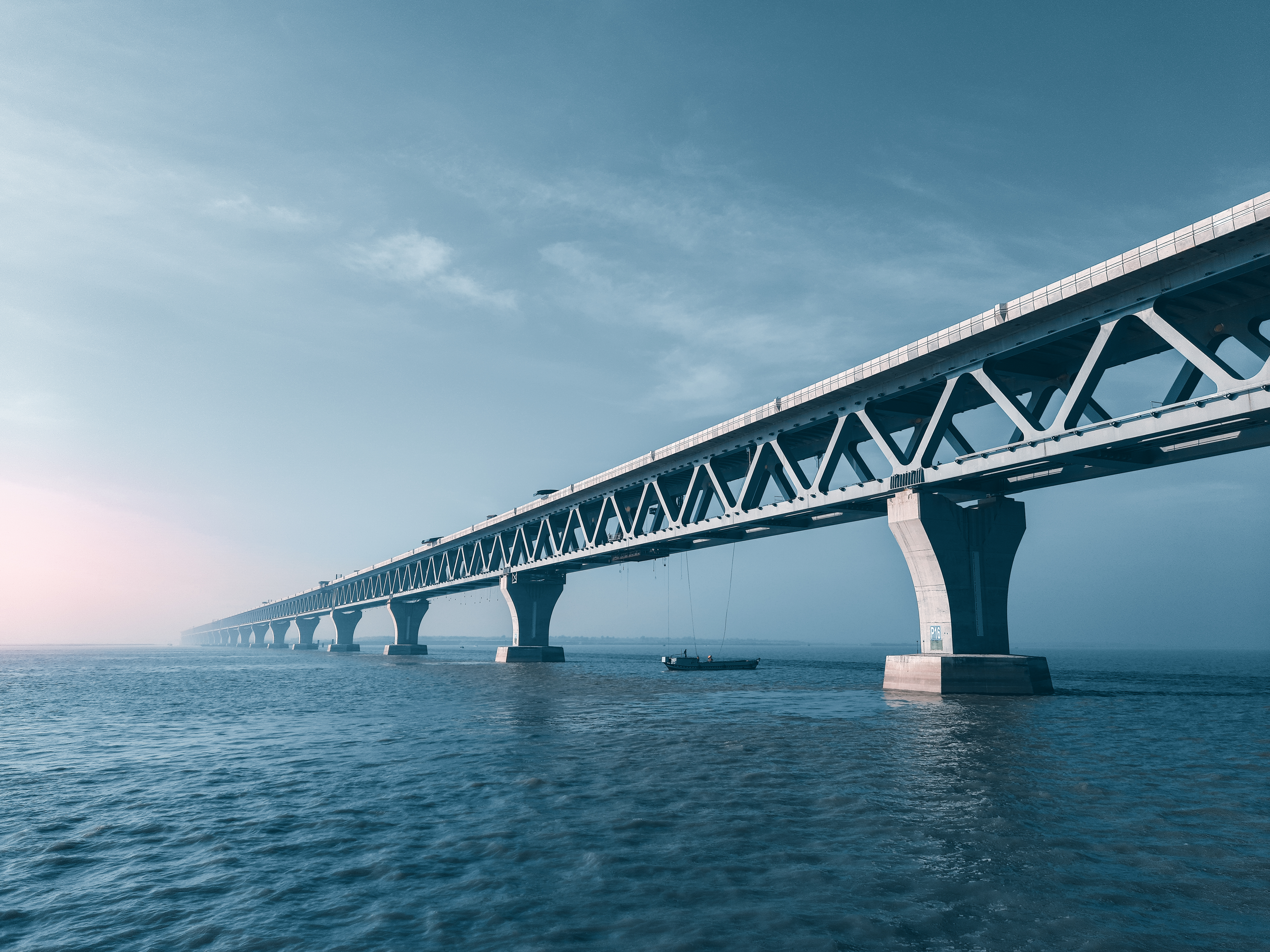
Padma Bridge in November 2021

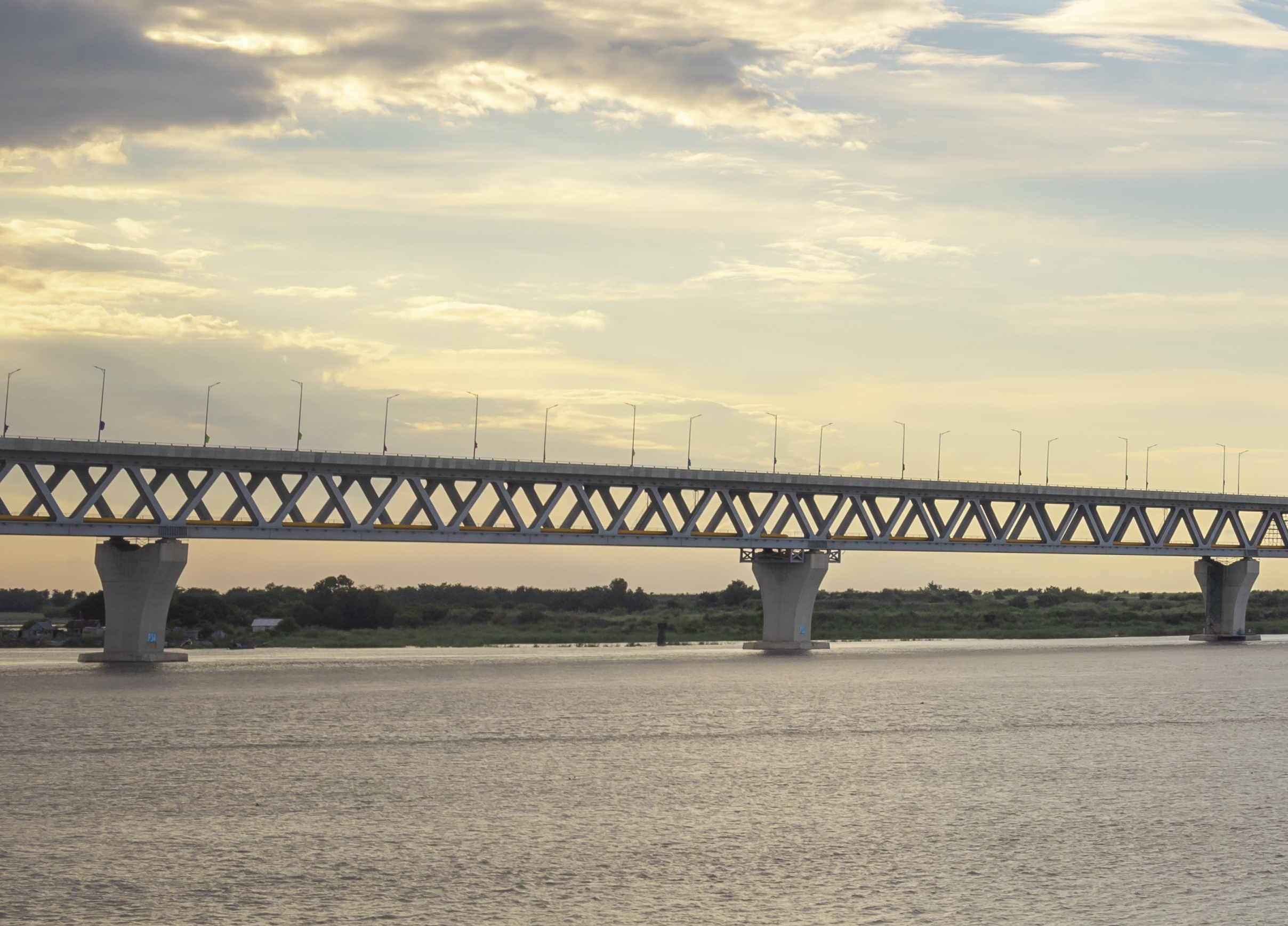
One day prior to inauguration

== See also ==
- 99th Composite Brigade – a brigade of Bangladesh Army deployed to ensure security of the bridge
- Ganges Barrage Project – another proposed mega-project to combat the water deficiency caused by the Farakka Barrage
- Jamuna Bridge – a similar completed bridge across the Jamuna River
- Padma Cantonment – a cantonment built near the Padma Multipurpose Bridge
- List of megaprojects in Bangladesh
- Padma Bridge graft scandal
