= Darshana–Jessore–Khulna line =

Railway line in Bangladesh

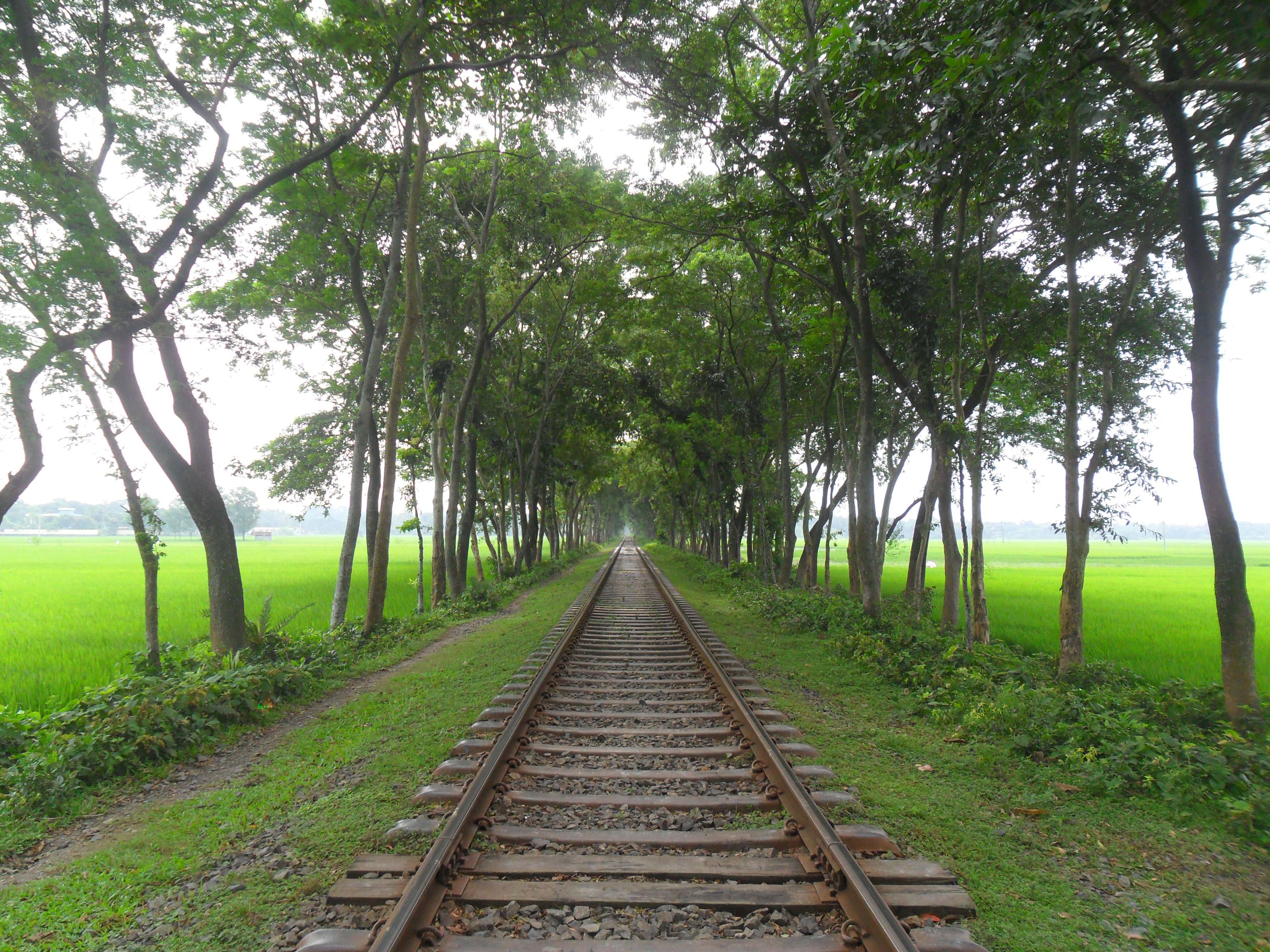

Overview
- Status: Functioning
- Owner: Bangladesh Railway
- Locale: Bangladesh
- Termini: Darshana Junction railway station; Khulna railway station
- Stations: 23

Service
- Type: Railway line in Bangladesh

History
- Opened: Benapole-Jessore–Khulna (opened 1884); Darshana–Jessore (1954)

Technical
- Track gauge: Broad-gauge 1,676 mm (5 ft 6 in)
- Operating speed: 80 km/h (50 mph)

Darshana–Jessore–Khulna line is a broad-gauge railway of Bangladesh Railway. The line is maintained and operated by West Zone.

== History ==
The British Indian government constructed the Chilahati–Parbatipur–Santahar–Darshana line in 1878 and the Kolkata–Jessore to Khulna line in 1878 to start a direct service from Calcutta to Siliguri. But after the partition of the country in 1947, the railway communication between the two countries was cut off. The direct rail link between Khulna in then East Pakistan and North Bengal was disrupted. So very quickly the then provincial government quickly laid a new railway line from Darshana Junction to Jessore Junction by 1951.

== Sections ==
=== Jessore–Benapole section ===
This section stretches from Jessore Junction via Benapole–Petrapole to Dum Dum Junction. Benapole Express, Bandhan Express, Benapole Commuter, Khulna Commuter and freight trains ply through this route.

=== Khulna–Mongla section ===
Khulna–Mongla Port line is being constructed to connect Port of Mongla with rail across the country. It will be a 65 km (40 mi) long broad gauge railway. Rupsha Rail Bridge is part of this route.

=== Rupsha–Bagerhat section ===
Rupsha–Bagerhat line is a 2 ft 6 in (762 mm) narrow gauge line that served as a link between Rupsha and Bagerhat. The railway line was constructed in 1918 and was declared abandoned in 1998. The 20-mile (32 km) long railroad carried 13 coaches and 8 freight cars in 1958.
