= West Zone (Bangladesh Railway) =

Railway zone in Bangladesh

Bangladesh Railway West Zone
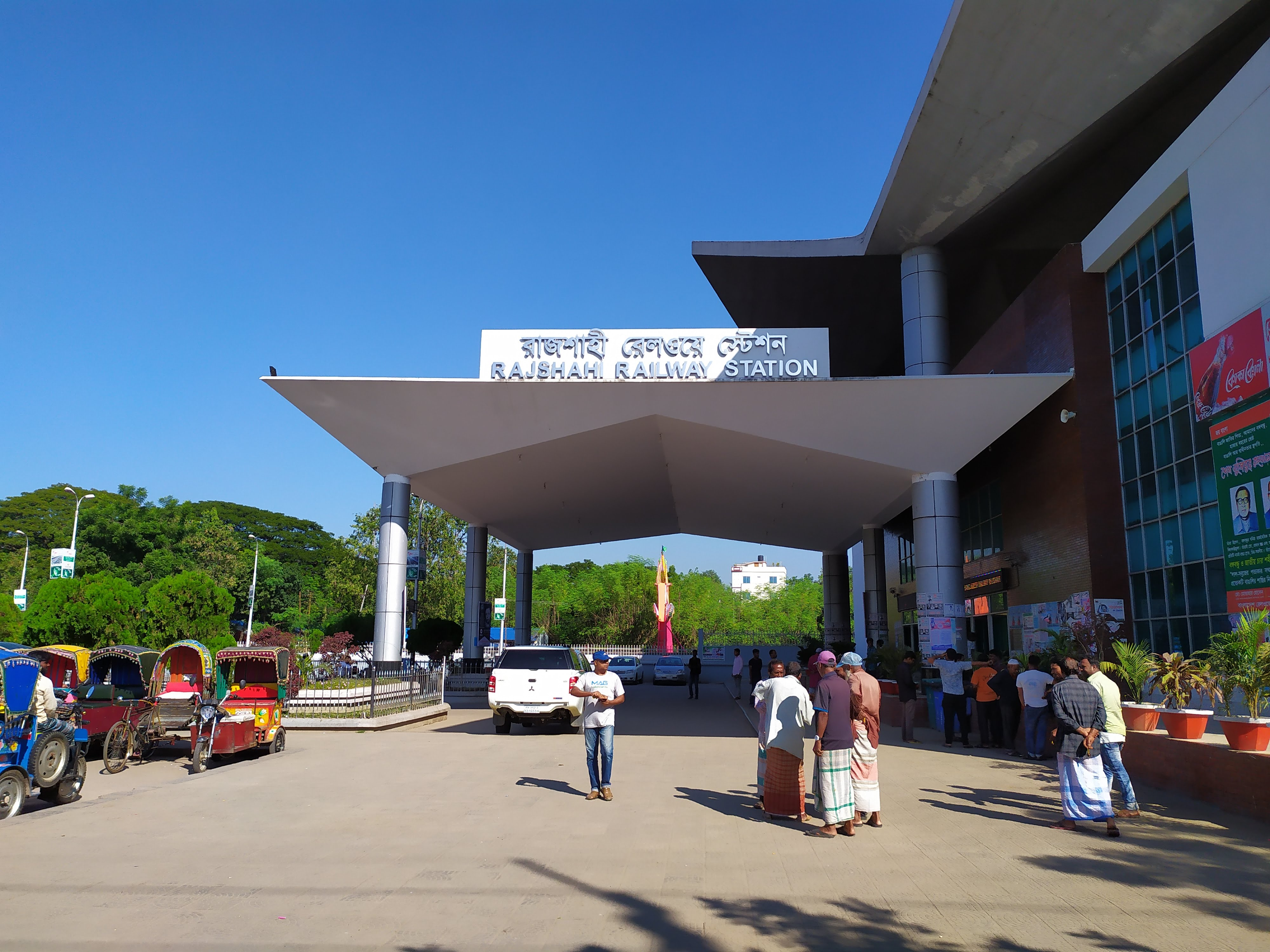
- Rajshahi Railway Station

Overview
- Headquarters: RRB Building, Rajshahi
- Locale: Rangpur Division, Rajshahi Division, Khulna Division and (Tangail District & Faridpur District) of Dhaka Division
- Dates of operation: 3 June 1982; 44 years ago–

Technical
- Track gauge: Broad-gauge (BG), Meter-gauge (MG) and Dual gauge(DG)
- Length: 1,427 kilometres (887 mi)

Other
- Website: www.railway.gov.bd

West Zone is a railway zone operated by Bangladesh Railway. 2,800 km of railway lines in Bangladesh are operated through four divisions in two Zones, West Zone being one of the two zones. This Zone consists of Rangpur Division, Rajshahi Division, Khulna Division, as well as Tangail and Faridpur districts of Dhaka Division of Bangladesh. The head office of West Zone is located in Rajshahi.

== Operational Divisions ==
There are two divisions under the west zone. They are

- Paksey railway division
- Lalmonirhat railway division

== Line under West Zone ==
=== Operational ===
- Chilahati–Parbatipur–Santahar–Darshana line
- Darshana–Jessore–Khulna line
- Jamtoil–Joydebpur line
- Khulna–Mongla Port line
- Santahar–Kaunia line
- Burimari–Lalmonirhat–Parbatipur line
- Ishwardi–Sirajganj line
- Old Malda–Abdulpur line
- Pachuria–Bhanga line
- Poradah–Goalundo Ghat line
- Kalukhali–Gobra line
- Parbatipur–Panchagarh line
- Dhaka–Jessore line (partial)

=== Under construction ===
- Madhukhali–Magura line

=== Defunct ===
- Rupsha–Bagerhat line
- Jashore–Jhenaidah Line

=== Proposed ===
- Darshana–Meherpur line
- Nabharan–Satkhira–Munshiganj Forest line
- Katakhali–Bagerhat line
- Gobra–Pirojpur line
- Gopalganj–Kotalipara–Poysharhat-Gaurnadi line
- Bhanga–Kuakata line

== See also ==
- Bangladesh Railway
- Bangladesh Railways East Zone
