= Feni Junction railway station =

Railway station in Feni District, Bangladesh

Feni Junction ফেনী জংশন

General information
- Location: Feni Sadar Upazila, Feni District, Chittagong; Bangladesh
- Coordinates: 23°00′48″N 91°24′13″E
- System: Junction station in Bangladesh
- Owner: Bangladesh Railway
- Operator: Bangladesh Railway
- Line: Akhaura–Laksam–Chittagong
- Train operators: East zone

Construction
- Structure type: Standard
- Cycle facilities: Yes
- Accessible: Yes

Other information
- Status: Operating
- Website: www.railway.gov.bd

History
- Opened: 1 July 1895
Route map
Location
- Location within Bangladesh

Feni Junction Railway Station (Bengali: ফেনী জংশন রেলওয়ে স্টেশন) is a railway station located in Feni Sadar Upazila, Feni District, Chittagong Division, Bangladesh.

== History ==
The Assam Bengal Railway Company, formed in England in 1892, took charge of the construction of railways in the country. On 1 July 1895, the 150 km meter-gauge line from Chittagong to Comilla and the 69 km railway line from Laksam to Chandpur were opened to the public. Feni railway station was constructed as a station on the Chittagong-Comilla line. When the Agartala railway was built from Feni to Bilonia in 1929, Feni became a junction station.

== Services ==
17 trains ply through Feni Junction railway station. The following is a list of trains plying through Feni Railway Station:

- Subarna Express
- Paharika Express
- Mohanagar Provati/Godhuli Express
- Udayan Express
- Meghna Express
- Mohanagar Express
- Turna Express
- Bijoy Express
- Sonar Bangla Express
- Mymensingh Express
- Karnafuli Express
- Dhaka-Chittagong Mail
- Sagarika Express
- Chattala Express
- Laksam Commuter
- Jalalabad Express, and
- Local train
