= Sonar Bangla Express =

Intercity passenger train in Bangladesh

- At the Kamalapur Railway Station

Overview
- Service type: Inter-city rail
- Status: Operating
- Locale: Dhaka and Chittagong
- First service: 25 June 2016, 10 years ago
- Current operator: Bangladesh Railway
- Ridership: 8,900 to 10,000 (Weekly)
- Daily ridership: 745 to 835
- Annual ridership: 4,60,000 to 5,20,000
- Website: http://www.railway.gov.bd/

Route
- Termini: Kamalapur Railway Station; Chattogram railway station
- Stops: 3
- Distance travelled: 321 km
- Average journey time: 4 hours & 55 minutes
- Service frequency: 6 days a week
- Train number: 787/788
- Lines used: Narayanganj–Bahadurabad Ghat line, Tongi–Bhairab–Akhaura line Akhaura–Laksam–Chittagong line

On-board services
- Classes: Non-AC Cabin, AC Cabin, AC Chair and Non-AC Chair
- Seating arrangements: Yes
- Sleeping arrangements: No
- Auto-rack arrangements: Yes
- Catering facilities: On-board, two pantry carriage at two ends.
- Observation facilities: Yes
- Entertainment facilities: Yes
- Baggage facilities: Overhead racks
- Other facilities: Charging sockets, automatic sliding doors, prayer room in generator carriage with ablution facilities.

Technical
- Rolling stock: One 3000 Class Locomotive; Five AC Chair carriages; Three AC Cabin carriages; Six Non AC Chair carriages; One Non AC Cabin; One generator car; Two guard brake carriages with Buffet car and Non AC chair
- Track gauge: Metre gauge
- Electrification: No
- Operating speed: 80-89 KM/H
- Average length: 18/36
- Track owner: Bangladesh Railway
- Rake maintenance: Pahartali Yard

The Sonar Bangla Express (Train no. 787/788) is an inter-city rail service run by Bangladesh Railway. This service provides a passenger rail connection between the capital of Bangladesh, Dhaka and the port city of Chattogram. This service only has one intermediate stop at Dhaka Airport.

== History ==
Sonar Bangla Express was introduced as a nonstop Inter-city train that offers quality food and fast service. Since its inauguration, the train had started from Dhaka Kamalapur railway station. Sonar Bangla Express gets the 2nd top priority on Bangladesh Railway network. It only gives stoppage at Dhaka Airport Station. The train fare is similar to that of Suborno Express. Since 2021, food price is not included in the tickets supplied by Bangladesh Parjatan Corporation. On 16 April 2023, during an Eid trip, Sonar Bangla Express derailed and hit a goods train in Nangalkot, Comilla at 6:30PM. Sixty people were injured.

== Schedule ==
The train departs Dhaka railway station at 07:00 AM (Bangladesh Standard Time) and arrives in Chattogram at 11:55 AM. On the return trip, it departs Chattogram at 05:00 PM and arrives in Dhaka at 09:55 PM. This train runs 6 days a week and weekly holiday is Wednesday from Dhaka to Chattogram route, and Tuesday for Chattogram to Dhaka route.

== Rolling stock ==
After inauguration, the train ran with 14 Indonesia-made red-green PT INKA air-brake coaches. These coaches were imported in 2016. However after the accident at 16th April 2023. 7 compartments was badly damaged to even be repaired. Shonar Bangla temporarily used South Korean coaches made by Sung Sing Rolling Stock Technology (SSRST) for the Eid Trips on April 19th after suspending Sonar Bangla Service for 3 days before switching to Indonesian Made PT-INKA. From 16 August, 2023 the train began running permanently with South Korean coaches made by Sung Sing Rolling Stock Technology (SSRST). With 4 new coaches, the number of coaches of Shonar Bangla Express rise to 18. Sonar Bangla Express is hauled by a Class 3000 of Bangladesh Railway. The train needs an air-braked locomotive which is mandatory.

== Stopovers (Including Termini) ==
- Dhaka Kamalapur Railway Station
- Dhaka Airport Railway Station
- Chattogram Railway Station

== Gallery ==
Intercity 788 Sonar Bangla Express at Kamalapur Railway Station

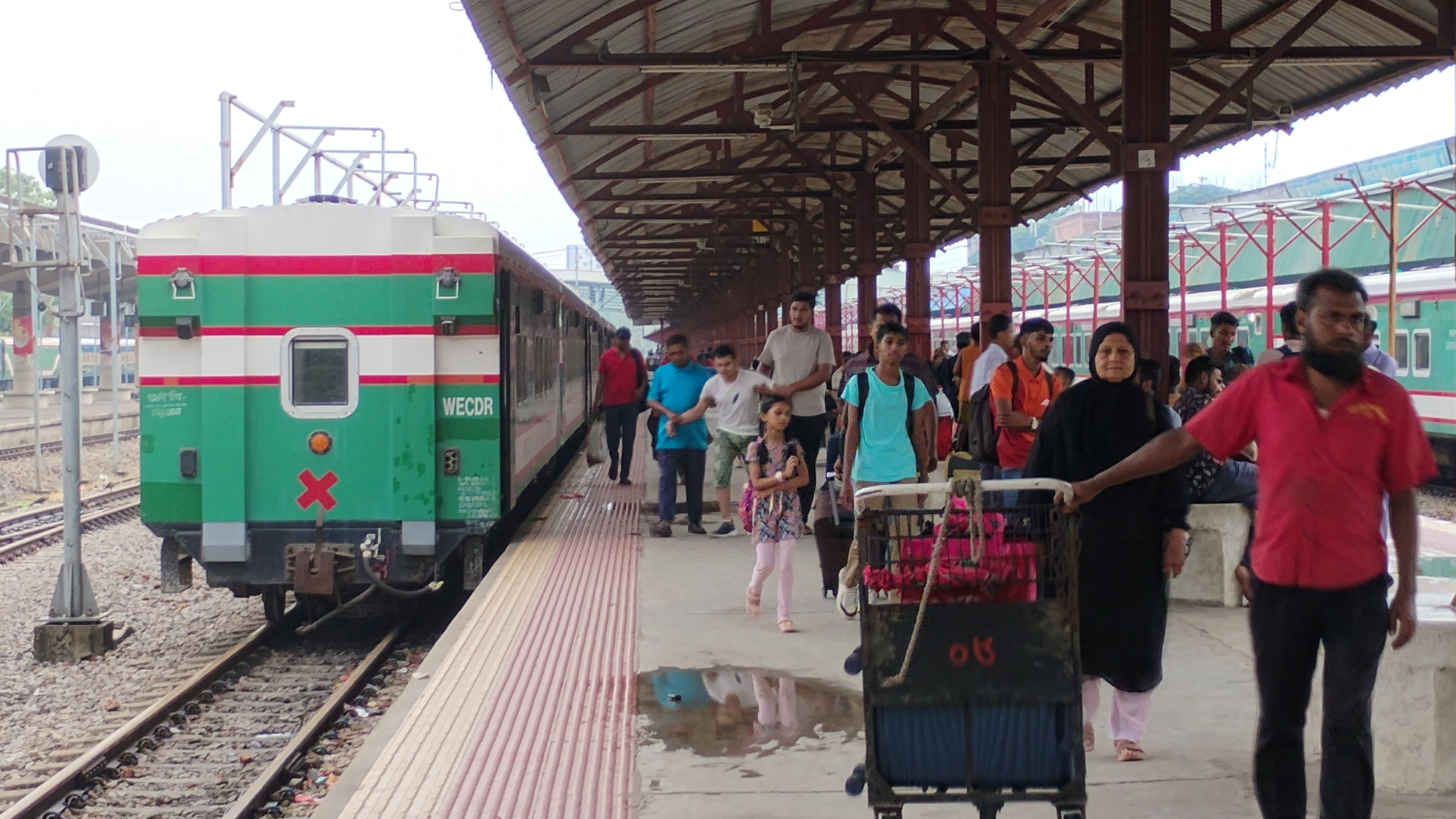
Intercity 788 Sonar Bangla Express at Chattagram Railway Station

== See also ==
- Mahanagar Probhati/Godhuli Express
- Mahanagar Express
- Parjotak Express
- Cox's Bazar Express
- Suborno Express
- Chattala Express
