= Mahanagar Prabhati/Godhuli Express =

Intercity passenger train in Bangladesh

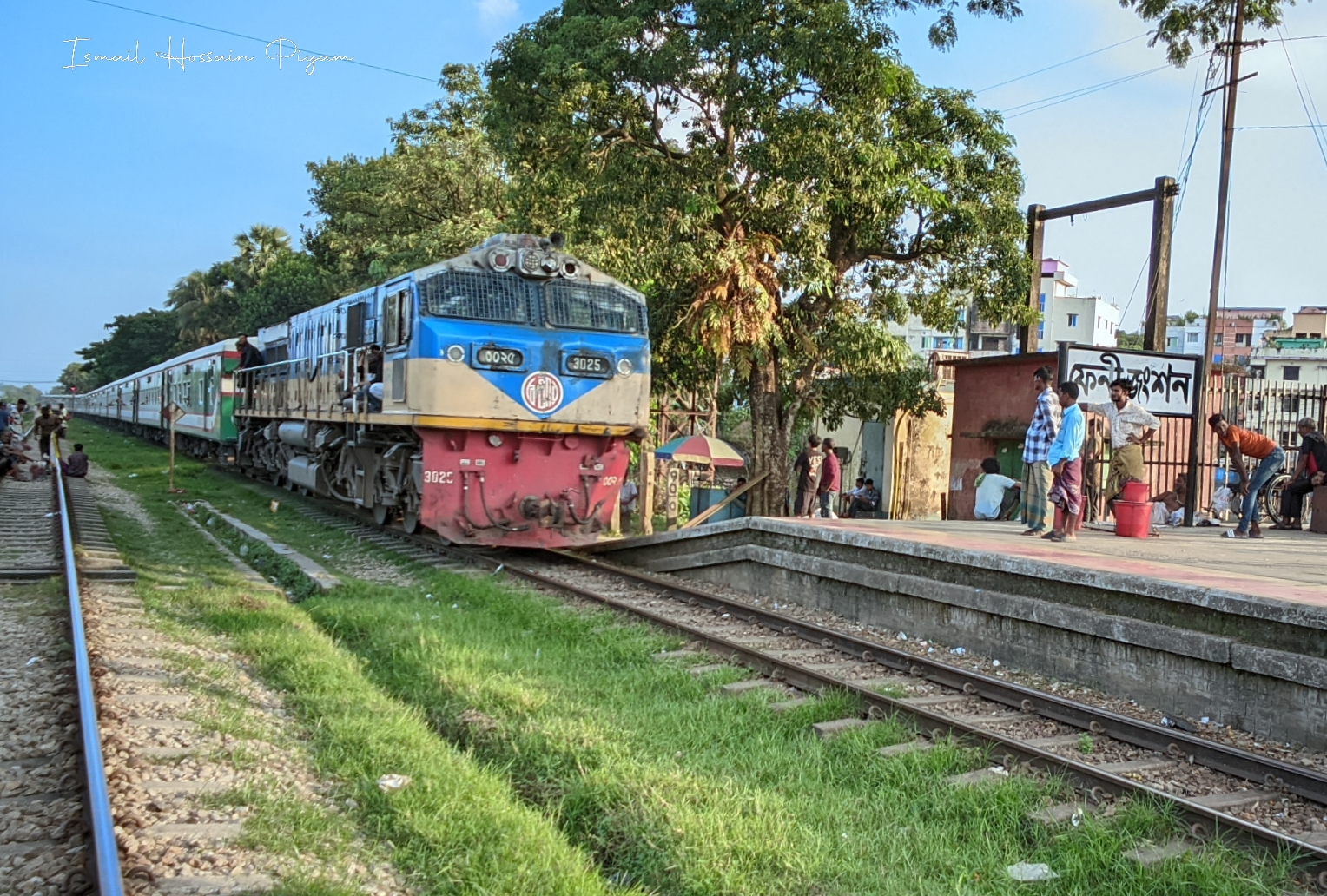

Overview
- Service type: Inter-city rail
- Status: Operating
- First service: 25 February 1986
- Current operator: Bangladesh Railway

Route
- Termini: Chattogram railway station Kamalapur railway station
- Stops: 8
- Train number: 703/704

On-board services
- Seating arrangements: Airline style
- Sleeping arrangements: Yes
- Catering facilities: On-board
- Observation facilities: Large windows
- Entertainment facilities: Yes
- Baggage facilities: Overhead racks

Technical
- Track gauge: 1,000 mm (3 ft 3 3/8 in)
- Electrification: N/A
- Operating speed: 80 km
- Average length: 18/36
- Rake maintenance: Pahartali
- Rake sharing: Turna Express

Mahanagar Prabhati/Godhuli Express (Train No. 703/704) is an intercity passenger train in Bangladesh operated by Bangladesh Railways, which runs between Chittagong Railway Station in Chittagong District and Kamalapur railway station in Dhaka District. The train runs from Chittagong to Dhaka under the name Mahanagar Godhuli and from Dhaka to Chittagong under the name Mahanagar Prabhati. The train connects Feni, Comilla, Brahmanbaria districts along the route. Along with this train, the following trains run on the Chittagong-Dhaka route: Subarna Express, Mahanagar Express, Turna Express, Shonar Bangla Express, Chattala Express, Dhaka/Chittagong Mail and Karnaphuli Express. The base of the train is Chittagong Railway Station.

== History ==
The train was inaugurated on Friday, 25 February 1986. The train officially started running on Saturday, 26 February 1986. At that time, the train was running on the Dhaka - Dohazari route. From 1998, two trains, Mahanagar Prabhati/Godhuli and Turna, started running by sharing rakes. From 2002, the train started running on the Dhaka - Chittagong route.

== Stopover ==
(Sometimes, the stops of a train may be changed by Bangladesh Railway. The following list is valid till 2020.)

- Feni Junction
- Gunawati
- Laksam Junction
- Comilla
- Akhaura Junction
- Brahmanbaria
- Bhairab Bazar Junction
- Narsingdi railway station
- Dhaka Airport railway station

== Rolling stock ==
The train uses a 3000 class locomotive. Previously, 2900 or 2600 class locomotives were used. The train initially ran on a rake of old green-yellow vacuum brake coaches. Later in 2011, this rake was changed to a white Chinese air brake coach rake. Later, the train's rake was changed again to red-green Indonesian air brake PT Inka 2016 model coach rake. Currently, the train runs on a 18/36 load. Out of these 18 coaches, there are 5 AC chairs, 3 AC sleepers, 1 non-AC sleepers, 6 fully shovon chairs, 2 shovon chairs guard brake + dining car and 1 power car. When passenger demand increases (such as during Eid), the train is run on a 21/42 load. Currently, it is being operated with state-of-the-art coaches imported from Korea.
