= Parjatak Express =

Train in Bangladesh

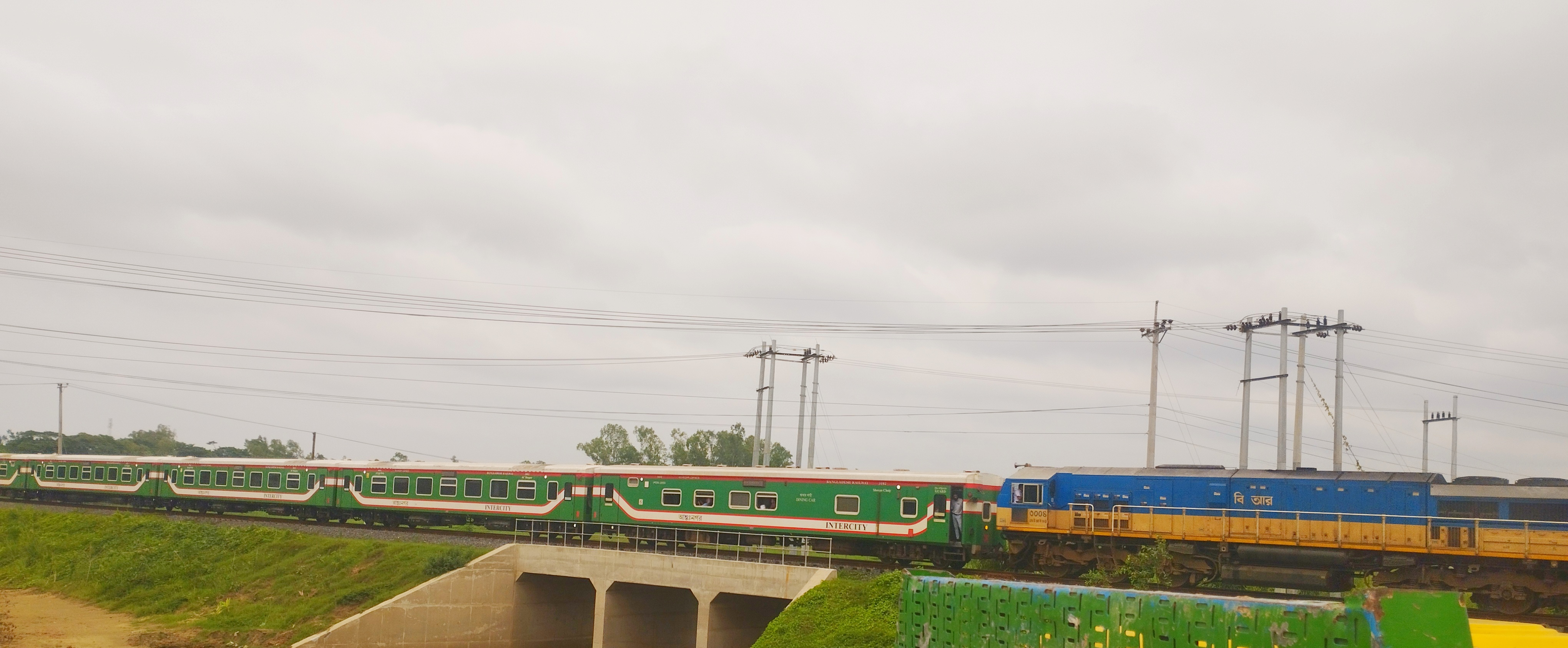

Overview
- Service type: Intercity
- System: Bangladesh Railway
- Status: Operational
- First service: 10 January 2024; 2 years ago
- Current operator: East Zone

Route
- Termini: Dhaka; Cox's Bazar
- Stops: 4 in both directions
- Distance travelled: 551 km (342 mi)
- Average journey time: 480 mins
- Service frequency: 6 days/week
- Train numbers: 815 and 816
- Lines used: Narayanganj–Bahadurabad Ghat; Tongi–Bhairab–Akhaura; Akhaura–Laksam–Chittagong; Chittagong–Cox's Bazar

On-board services
- Classes: AC Sleeper, AC Chair and Non-AC Chair
- Seating arrangements: Yes
- Sleeping arrangements: Yes
- Catering facilities: Yes
- Entertainment facilities: Yes
- Baggage facilities: Overhead racks
- Other facilities: Wi-fi, prayer room in genarator car with ablution facilities, automatic sliding door

Technical
- Track gauge: 1,000 mm (3 ft 3 3/8 in) metre gauge mixed with 1,676 mm (5 ft 6 in) in Dual Gauge Layout
- Operating speed: 70 km/h (43 mph)
- Track owner: Ministry of Railways

The Parjatak Express (Bengali: পর্যটক এক্সপ্রেস) is a non-stop intercity train belonging to Bangladesh Railway – East Zone that runs between Dhaka and Cox's Bazar railway station from 10 January 2024. This is the second commercial train that gives service in Cox's Bazar.

== History ==
The construction of the Dohazari–Cox's Bazar section of the Chittagong–Cox's Bazar line was planned to be completed by September 2023. Bangladesh Railway planned to run at least 4 trains on the line after the construction of the section was completed. But due to various issues the authorities later decided to run an intercity train on the line. On 1 December 2023, Cox's Bazar Express, the first commercial train in Cox's Bazar went operational. On 6 December 2023, Bangladesh Railway announced the inauguration of another intercity train at Cox's Bazar on 1 January 2024, although the train was not launched on the promised date. Rather, on that day the name of the train was finalized and approved by the authorities. On 2 January 2024, it was announced that the train would be operational from 10 January 2024. The train went operational from the scheduled date.

== Service ==
This train is operated by Bangladesh Railway, connecting Dhaka, Dhaka Airport, Chittagong and Cox's Bazar. It is operated with train numbers 815/816 on 6 days a week basis (Sunday is the off day).

== Schedule ==
The schedule of this 815/816 Parjatak Express is given below:

Parjatak Express
815		Stations	816	
Arrival	Departure	Stations	Arrival	Departure
----	20:00	Cox's Bazar	15:00	----
22:50	23:15	Chittagong	11:20	11:40
03:50	03:53	Dhaka Airport	06:38	06:43
04:30	----	Dhaka	----	06:15
