= Dohazari Commuter =

Train in Bangladesh

Overview
- Service type: Commuter
- System: Bangladesh Railway
- Status: Discontinued
- First service: 6 February 2021; 5 years ago
- Last service: 1 August 2023; 2 years ago
- Current operator: East Zone

Route
- Termini: Chittagong; Dohazari
- Stops: 17 in both directions
- Distance travelled: 40 km (25 mi)
- Average journey time: 90 mins
- Service frequency: Daily
- Train number: Dohazari Commuter-1 to 4
- Lines used: Akhaura–Laksam–Chittagong line; Chittagong–Cox's Bazar line

On-board services
- Seating arrangements: Yes
- Sleeping arrangements: No
- Auto-rack arrangements: No
- Catering facilities: No
- Observation facilities: Yes
- Entertainment facilities: Yes
- Baggage facilities: Yes

Technical
- Track gauge: 1,000 mm (3 ft 3 3/8 in) metre gauge mixed with 1,676 mm (5 ft 6 in) in Dual Gauge Layout
- Operating speed: 45 km/h (28 mph)
- Track owner: Ministry of Railways

The Dohazari Commuter (Bengali: দোহাজারী কমিউটার) was a commuter train belonging to Bangladesh Railway – East Zone that runs between Chittagong and Dohazari railway station in Chittagong Division, Bangladesh.

== History ==
Before this train was launched, two local trains were running from Chittagong to Dohazari. The government had taken up plans to launch a commuter train on this route in 2021. In 6 February of the same year, this train named Dohazari Commuter was inaugurated through two diesel multiple unit. But due to the COVID-19 pandemic, the train had to be stopped. After the lifting of the lockdown in August of the same year, Bangladesh Railway decided to continue some trains and published the lists of the trains, but Dohazari Commuter was not in the list. However, the train was later resumed on the route. Since the Chittagong–Cox's Bazar line would be launched in 2023, the Ministry of Railways decided to expand the destination of the train to Cox's Bazar. However, on 1 August 2023, the train was discontinued for train engine, crew and coach shortage.
