= Probal Express =

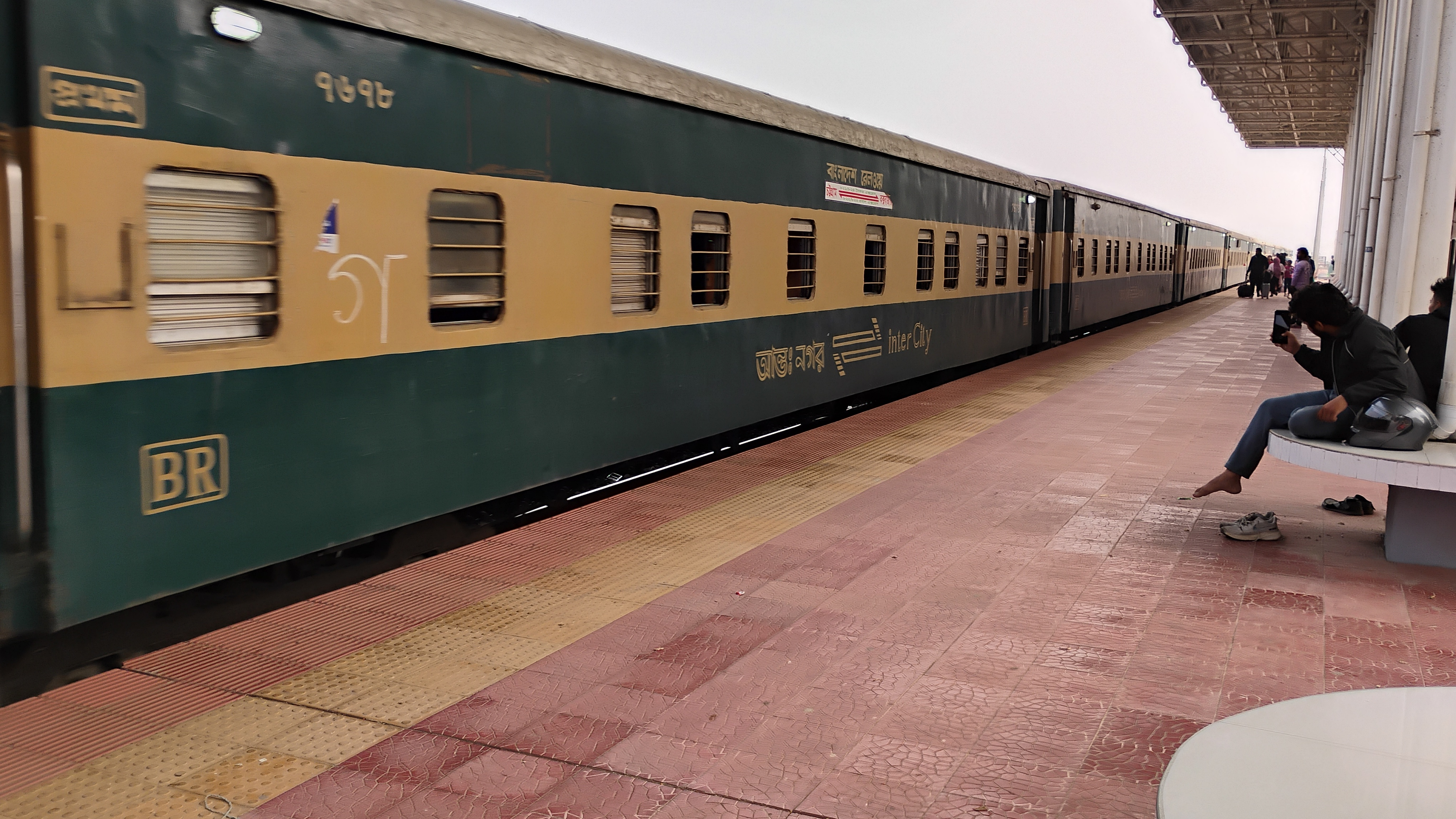
- Probal Express in 2025

Overview
- Service type: Intercity train
- System: Bangladesh Railway
- Status: Operational
- First service: 1 February 2025; 16 months ago
- Current operator: East Zone

Route
- Termini: Cox's Bazar; Chittagong
- Stops: 10 in both directions
- Distance travelled: 150.87 kilometres (93.75 mi)
- Average journey time: 250 mins
- Service frequency: 6 days/week
- Train numbers: 822 and 823
- Lines used: Akhaura–Laksam–Chittagong; Chittagong–Cox's Bazar

Technical
- Track gauge: 1,000 mm (3 ft 3 3/8 in) metre gauge mixed with 1,676 mm (5 ft 6 in) in Dual Gauge Layout
- Operating speed: 70 km/h (43 mph)
- Track owner: Ministry of Railways
- Rake sharing: Shaikat Express

The Probal Express (Bengali: প্রবাল এক্সপ্রেস) is an intercity train belonging to Bangladesh Railway – East Zone that runs between Cox's Bazar and Chittagong railway station from 1 February 2025.

== History ==
On 11 December 2024, Chief Operating Officer of East Zone proposed to Director General of Bangladesh Railway by an official letter to transform the Cox's Bazar Special into a regular train and run it for 4 times in a day as it had increasing demand. Bangladesh Railway accepted the proposal and decided to run another train on the same route of the Cox's Bazar Special. The authority named the proposed new train after Probal (lit. 'Coral'). On 9 January 2025, the proposal was approved by the Ministry of Railways. The train started its service on 1 February 2025. On 29 July 2025, East Zone published new schedule for the train which would be effective from 10 August.

== Service ==
This train is operated by Bangladesh Railway, connecting Cox's Bazar, Ramu, Islamabad, Dulahazara, Chakaraia, Harbang, Lohagara, Satkania, Dohazaria, Patia, Gomdondi, Sholashohor and Chittagong. It is currently operated with train numbers 822/823 on 6 days a week basis (Monday is the off day).

== Schedule ==
The schedule of this train is given below:

CXBZR - CTG - CXBZR Express
| 822 | | Stations | 823 | |
|---|---|---|---|---|
| Arrival | Departure | Stations | Arrival | Departure |
| ---- | 10:00 | Cox's Bazar | 19:00 | ---- |
| 10:13 | 10:15 | Ramu | 18:34 | 18:36 |
| 10:32 | 10:34 | Islamabad | 18:15 | 18:17 |
| 10:51 | 10:53 | Dulahazara | 17:56 | 17:58 |
| 11:15 | 11:17 | Chakaria | 17:32 | 17:34 |
| 11:30 | 11:32 | Harbang | 17:18 | 17:20 |
| 12:00 | 12:02 | Lohagara | 16:50 | 16:52 |
| 12:15 | 12:17 | Satkania | 16:35 | 16:37 |
| 12:30 | 12:44 | Dohazari | 16:22 | 16:24 |
| 13:06 | 13:08 | Patia | 16:00 | 16:02 |
| 13:26 | 13:28 | Gomdondi | 15:40 | 15:42 |
| 13:50 | 13:52 | Sholashohor | 15:21 | 15:23 |
| 14:10 | ---- | Chittagong | ---- | 15:10 |
