= Shaikat Express =

Overview
- Service type: Intercity train
- System: Bangladesh Railway
- Status: Operational
- Predecessor: Cox's Bazar Special
- First service: 1 February 2025; 18 months ago
- Current operator: East Zone

Route
- Termini: Chittagong; Cox's Bazar
- Stops: 9 in both directions
- Distance travelled: 150.87 kilometres (93.75 mi)
- Average journey time: 220 mins
- Service frequency: 6 days/week (Except Monday)
- Train numbers: 821 and 824
- Lines used: Akhaura–Laksam–Chittagong; Chittagong–Cox's Bazar

On-board services
- Seating arrangements: Yes
- Sleeping arrangements: No
- Catering facilities: On-Board
- Observation facilities: Small windows
- Entertainment facilities: Yes
- Baggage facilities: Overhead racks

Technical
- Track gauge: Metre gauge
- Electrification: N/A
- Operating speed: 70 km/h (43 mph)
- Average length: 16/32
- Track owner: Ministry of Railways
- Rake maintenance: Pahartali
- Rake sharing: Probal Express

The Shaikat Express (Bengali: সৈকত এক্সপ্রেস) is an intercity train belonging to Bangladesh Railway – East Zone that runs between Chittagong and Cox's Bazar railway station from 1 February 2025.

== History ==
Rail transport started on Chittagong–Cox's Bazar line from 1 December 2023. However, all trains on the line was Dhaka-bound and there was no Chittagong-bound train. In April 2024, Bangladesh Railway announced to run 10-day special train with 8 stoppage from Chittagong to Cox's Bazar for Eid al-Fitr. However, the special train service was functional even after 10 days and was later discontinued in 30 May for "engine and locomaster shortage". One the same year, the train started its 10-day operation again for Eid al-Adha from 12 June. Later its service was extended to 30 days. The special train was in operation till September 2024 and its operation was extended to 15 October. From April 2024 to December 2024, the special train earned ৳20 million with 0.1 million ridership. On 11 December 2024, Chief Operating Officer of East Zone proposed to Director General of Bangladesh Railway by an official letter to transform the special train into a regular train and run the train for 4 times in a day as it has increasing demand. Bangladesh Railway accepted the proposal and decided to name the proposed regular train after Shaikat (lit. 'Beach'). On 9 January 2025, the proposal was approved by the Ministry of Railways. The train started its service as regular on 1 February 2025. On 29 July 2025, East Zone published new schedule for the train which would be effective from 10 August.

== Service ==
This train is operated by Bangladesh Railway, connecting Chittagong, Sholashohor, Janalihat, Patia, Dohazari, Satkania, Harbang, Chakaria, Dulahazara, Ramu and Cox's Bazar. It is currently operated with train numbers 821/824 on 6 days a week basis (Monday is the off day).

== Schedule ==
The schedule of this train is given below:

CTG - CXBZR - CTG Express
821		Stations	824	
Arrival	Departure	Stations	Arrival	Departure
----	05:50	Chittagong	23:50	----
06:00	16:02	Sholashohor	----	----
06:14	06:16	Janalihat	23:10	23:12
06:40	06:42	Patia	22:42	22:44
07:04	07:06	Dohazari	22:18	22:20
07:17	07:19	Satkania	22:05	22:07
07:56	07:58	Harbang	21:26	21:28
08:10	08:12	Chakaria	21:12	21:14
08:33	08:35	Dulahazara	20:48	20:50
09:06	09:08	Ramu	20:15	20:17
09:25	----	Cox's Bazar	----	20:00
