= Mainamati railway station =

Railway station in Cumilla District, Bangladesh

Mainamati ময়নামতি
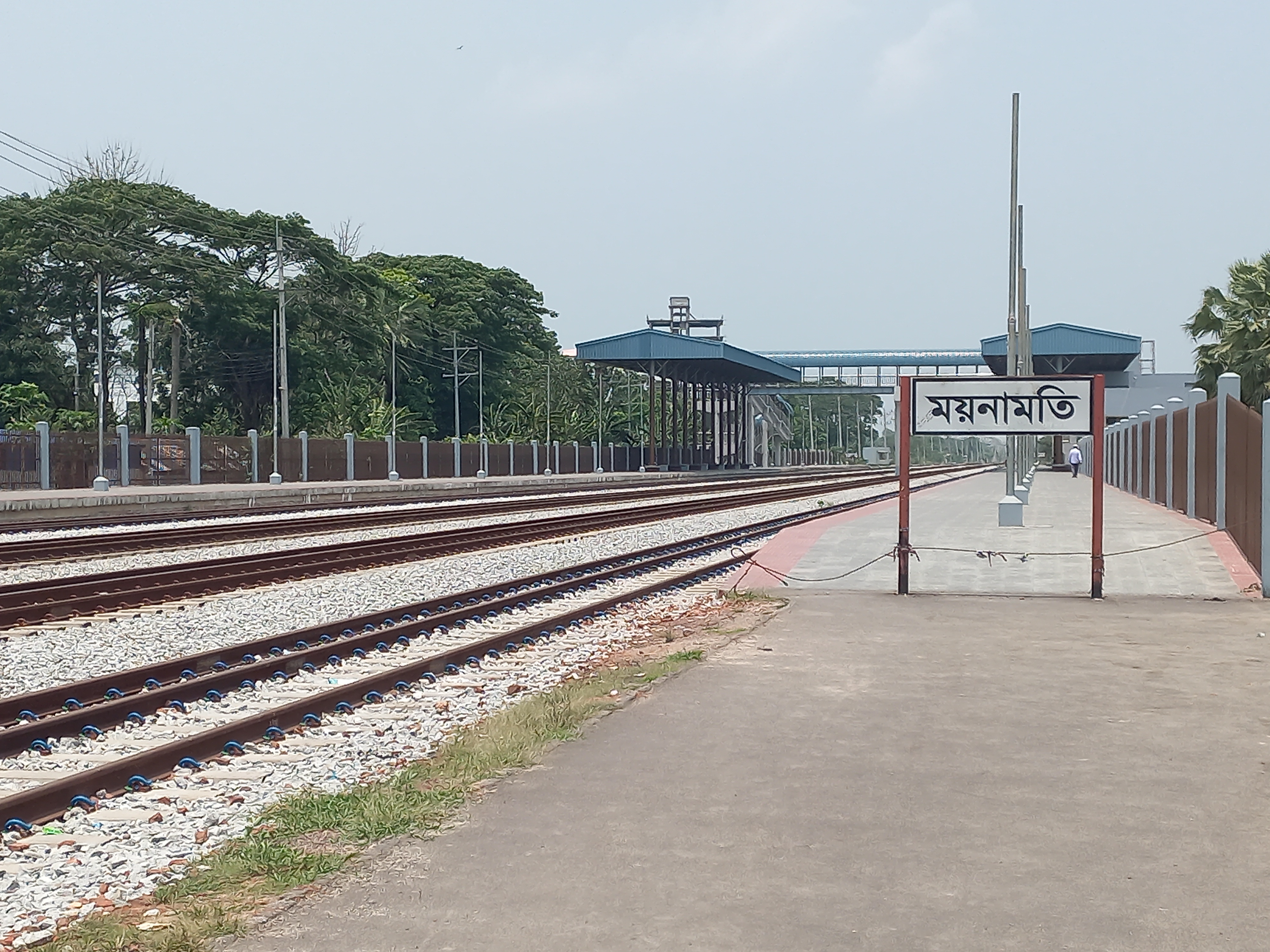
- Mainamati railway station in 2022

General information
- Location: Comilla Sadar Dakshin Upazila, Comilla District, Comilla Division; BAN
- System: Railway stations in Bangladesh
- Owner: Bangladesh Railway
- Operator: Bangladesh Railway
- Line: Akhaura–Laksam–Chittagong line
- Platforms: 1
- Tracks: Dual Gauge
- Train operators: East Zone

Construction
- Structure type: Standard
- Parking: No
- Cycle facilities: Yes
- Accessible: yes

History
- Opened: 1 July 1895
Location

Mainamati Railway Station is a railway station located in Comilla Sadar Dakshin Upazila of Comilla District of Chittagong Division, Bangladesh.

== History ==
The Assam Bengal Railway Company, formed in England in 1892, took over the responsibility of building railways in the country. On 1 July 1895, the 150 km metre gauge line from Chittagong to Comilla and the 69 km railway line from Laksam to Chandpur were opened to the public. Mainamati Railway Station was built as a station on the Chittagong-Comilla line.

On 23 January 2016, due to manpower shortage, 56 out of 170 stations of the Eastern Railway were closed. These included 14 stations on the Dhaka-Chittagong railway line, which included this station. However, local and some scheduled trains used to stop at Mainamati Railway Station.

On 16 March 2017, the authorities officially reopened the station to the public. However, despite the reopening, no trains stopped at the station for over 4 months and ticket sales did not resume.

== Train Service ==
The list of trains that pass through Mainamati Railway Station is given below:

- Subarna Express
- Paharika Express
- Mahanagar Prabhati\Godhuli Express
- Udayan Express
- Upkool Express
- Mahanagar Express
- Turna Express
- Bijoy Express
- Sonar Bangla Express
- Mymensingh Express
- Karnaphuli Express
- Dhaka\Chittagong Mail
- Dhaka\Noakhali Express
- Chattala Express
- Laksam Commuter
- Jalalabad Express and Local trains.
