= Cox's Bazar Express =

Train in Bangladesh

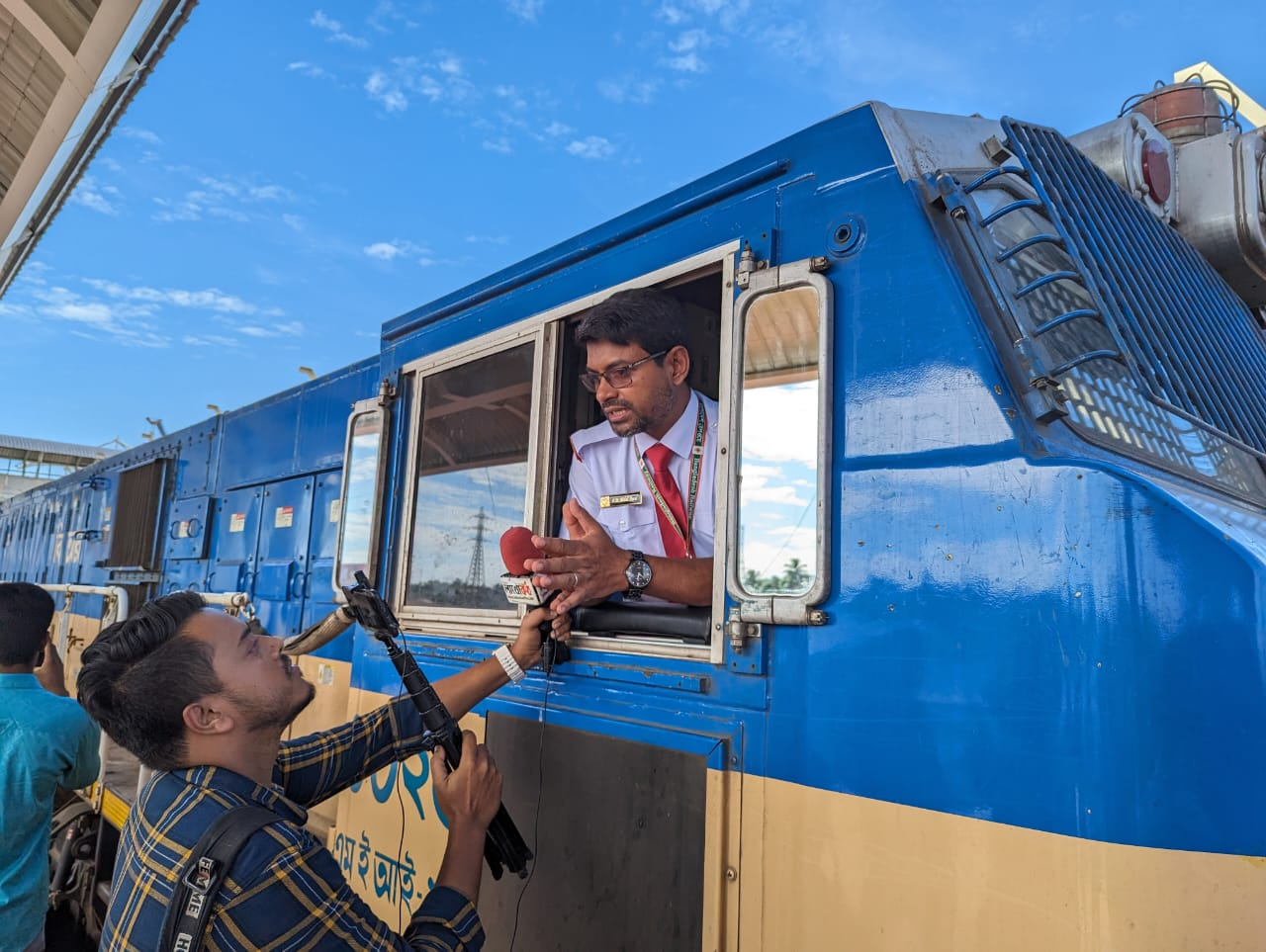

Overview
- Service type: Intercity
- System: Bangladesh Railway
- Status: Operational
- First service: 1 December 2023; 2 years ago
- Current operator: East Zone

Route
- Termini: Dhaka; Cox's Bazar
- Stops: 4 in both directions
- Distance travelled: 551 km (342 mi)
- Average journey time: 480 mins
- Service frequency: 6 days/week
- Train numbers: 813 and 814
- Lines used: Narayanganj–Bahadurabad Ghat; Tongi–Bhairab–Akhaura; Akhaura–Laksam–Chittagong; Chittagong–Cox's Bazar

On-board services
- Seating arrangements: Yes
- Sleeping arrangements: Yes
- Auto-rack arrangements: Yes
- Catering facilities: Yes
- Observation facilities: Yes
- Entertainment facilities: Yes
- Baggage facilities: Yes

Technical
- Rolling stock: BR Class 3000
- Track gauge: 1,000 mm (3 ft 3 3/8 in) metre gauge mixed with 1,676 mm (5 ft 6 in) in Dual Gauge Layout
- Operating speed: 70 km/h (43 mph)
- Track owner: Ministry of Railways

The Cox's Bazar Express (Bengali: কক্সবাজার এক্সপ্রেস) is a non-stop intercity train belonging to Bangladesh Railway – East Zone that runs between Dhaka and Cox's Bazar railway station from 1 December 2023. This is the first commercial train that gives service in Cox's Bazar.

== History ==
The construction of the Dohazari–Cox's Bazar section of the Chittagong–Cox's Bazar line was planned to be completed by September 2023. Bangladesh Railway planned to run at least 4 trains on the line after the construction of the section was completed. But due to various issues the authorities later decided to run an intercity train on the line. In November of the same year, it was announced that the scheduled train on the route would start running from 1 December. Six names were suggested for the train. On 16 November 2023, Md. Nurul Islam Sujon, the railway minister, announced the name of the train as Cox's Bazar Express. The train went operational from the scheduled date which is 1 December 2023.

== Service ==
This train is operated by Bangladesh Railway, connecting Dhaka, Dhaka Airport, Chittagong and Cox's Bazar. It is currently operated with train numbers 813/814 on 6 days a week basis (Tuesday is the off day for 813 and Monday for 814).

== Schedule ==
The schedule of this 813/814 Cox's Bazar–Dhaka Express is given below:

CXBZR - DA - CXBZR Express
813		Stations	814	
Arrival	Departure	Stations	Arrival	Departure
----	12:30	Cox's Bazar	07:20	----
15:40	16:00	Chattogram	03:40	04:20
----	----	Biman Bandar	23:23	23:28
21:00	----	Dhaka	----	23:00

== Coach composition ==
The 813/814 Cox's Bazar - Dhaka Express have 3 AC Cabin, 5 AC Chair, 6 Shovan Chair and 1 Executive Chair Car coaches.
