= Dohazari (disambiguation) =

Dohazari is a town in Bangladesh. It may also refer to:

- Dohazari Airfield, a Airfield in Chittagong District
- Dohazari Commuter, a train in Chittagong District
