= Comilla railway station =

Railway station in Comilla, Bangladesh

Cumilla কুমিল্লা
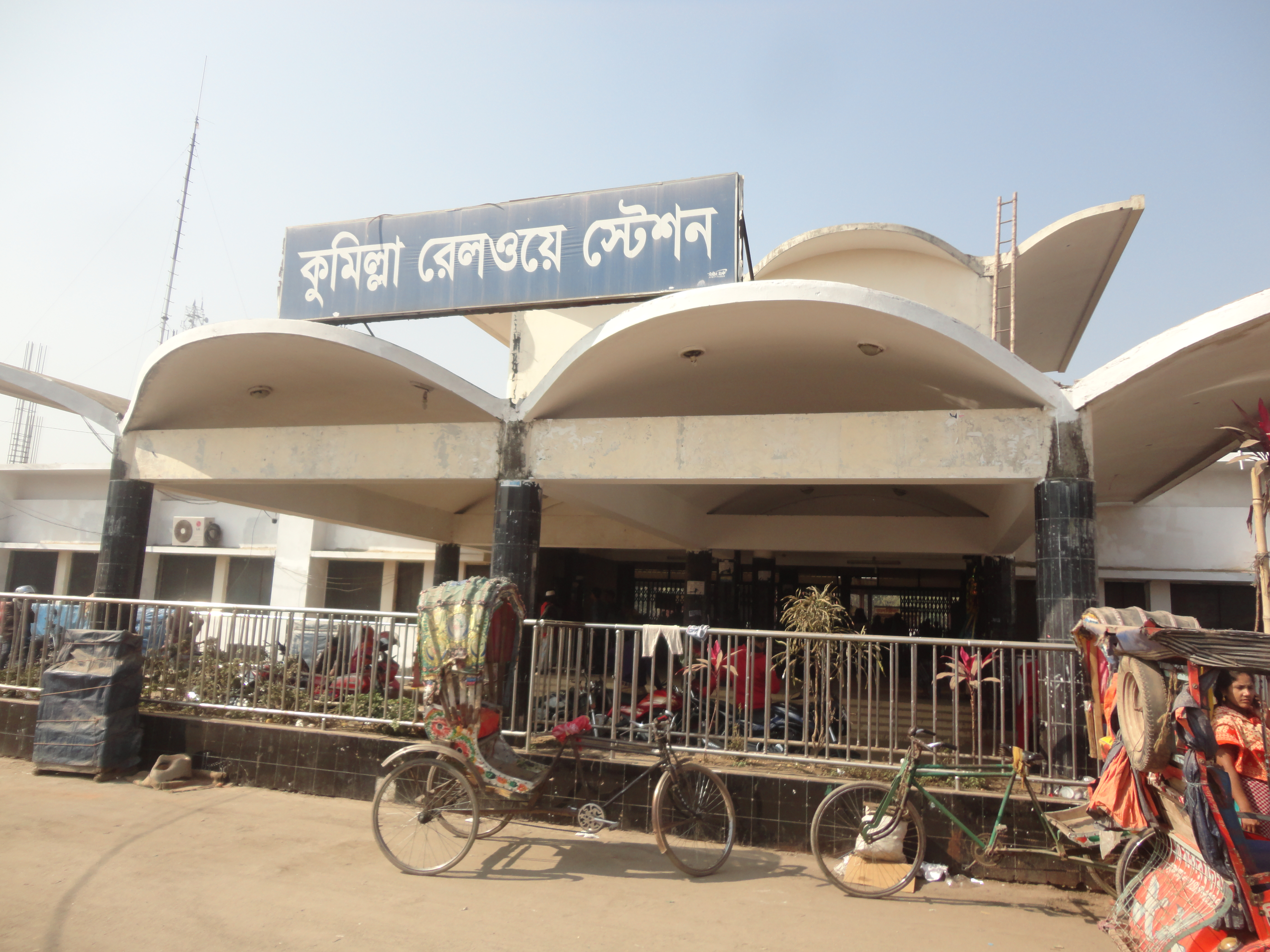

General information
- Other names: Comilla railway station
- Location: Station Road, Comilla; Bangladesh
- Coordinates: 23°27′49″N 91°10′00″E
- Owner: Bangladesh Railway
- Operator: East Zone
- Line: Akhaura–Laksam–Chittagong line
- Platforms: 3
- Tracks: Dual Gauge

Construction
- Structure type: Standard (on ground station)
- Parking: No

Other information
- Status: Active
- Station code: CML

History
- Opened: 1895; 131 years ago
- Former names: Tipperah Railway Station

Services
Preceding station	Comilla railway station	Following station
Rasulpur	Line; Akhaura–Laksam–Chittagong line	Mainamati
Location

Cumilla Railway Station is a primary railway station of the Eastern railway located in the town of Comilla. Every day trains from Dhaka, Chittagong, Sylhet, Mymensingh, Brahmanbaria, Chandpur and other districts run through this station. The railway station of Comilla established in 1895. In the same year, a railway line was constructed from this place to Chittagong with a length of 149.89 km. All trains entering Chittagong stop at Comilla Railway Station.

== Train service ==
Every day more than 13 trains run through Comilla railway station. Below is a list of trains running through Comilla Railway Station:

- Mahanagar Prabhati / Godhuli Express
- Upokul Express
- Paharika Express
- Mahanagar Express
- Udayan Express
- Turna Express
- Bijoy Express
- Dhaka/Chittagong Mail
- Karnaphuli Express
- Jalalabad Express
- Mymensingh Express
- Chattala Express

== Gallery ==
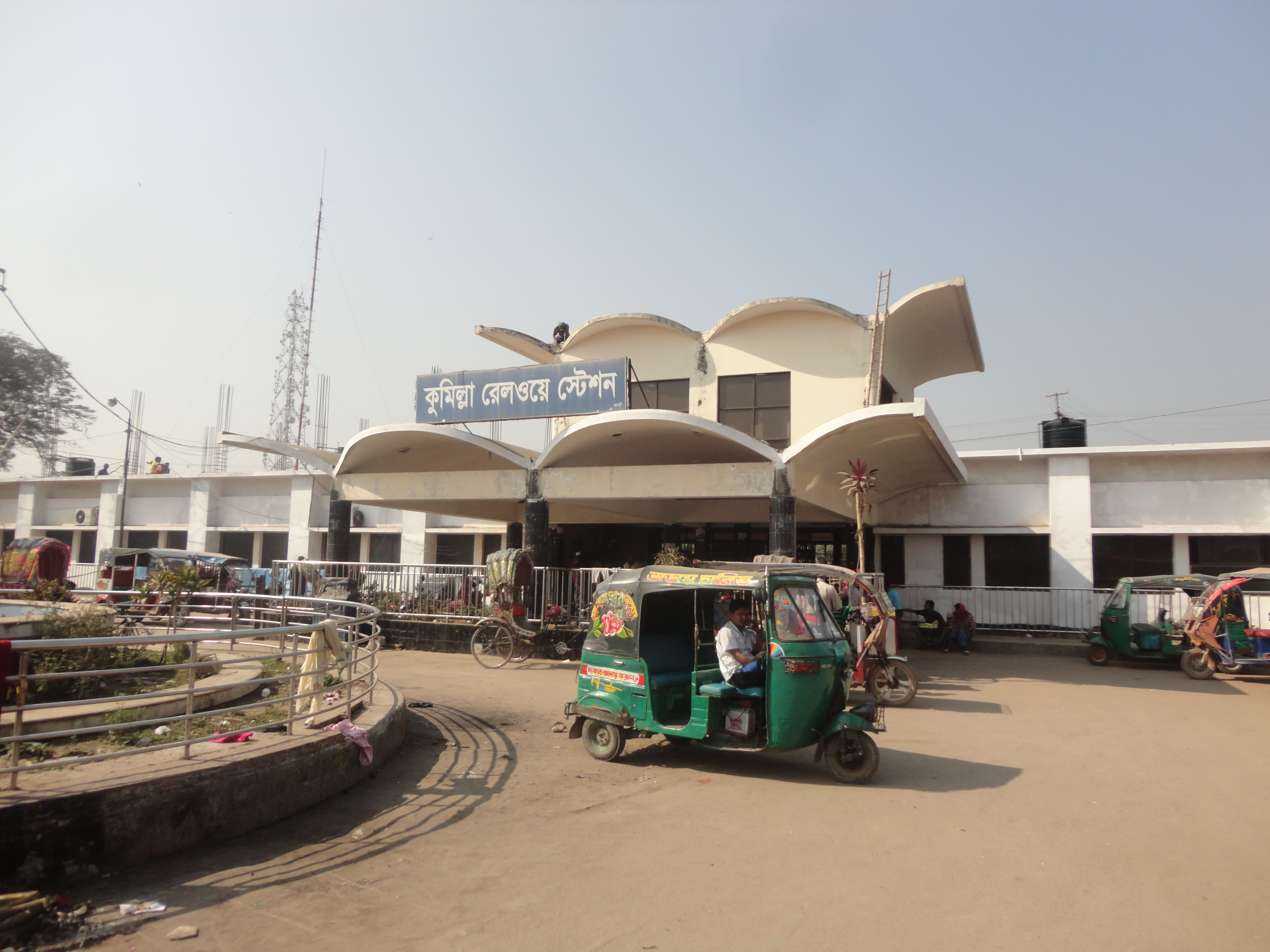

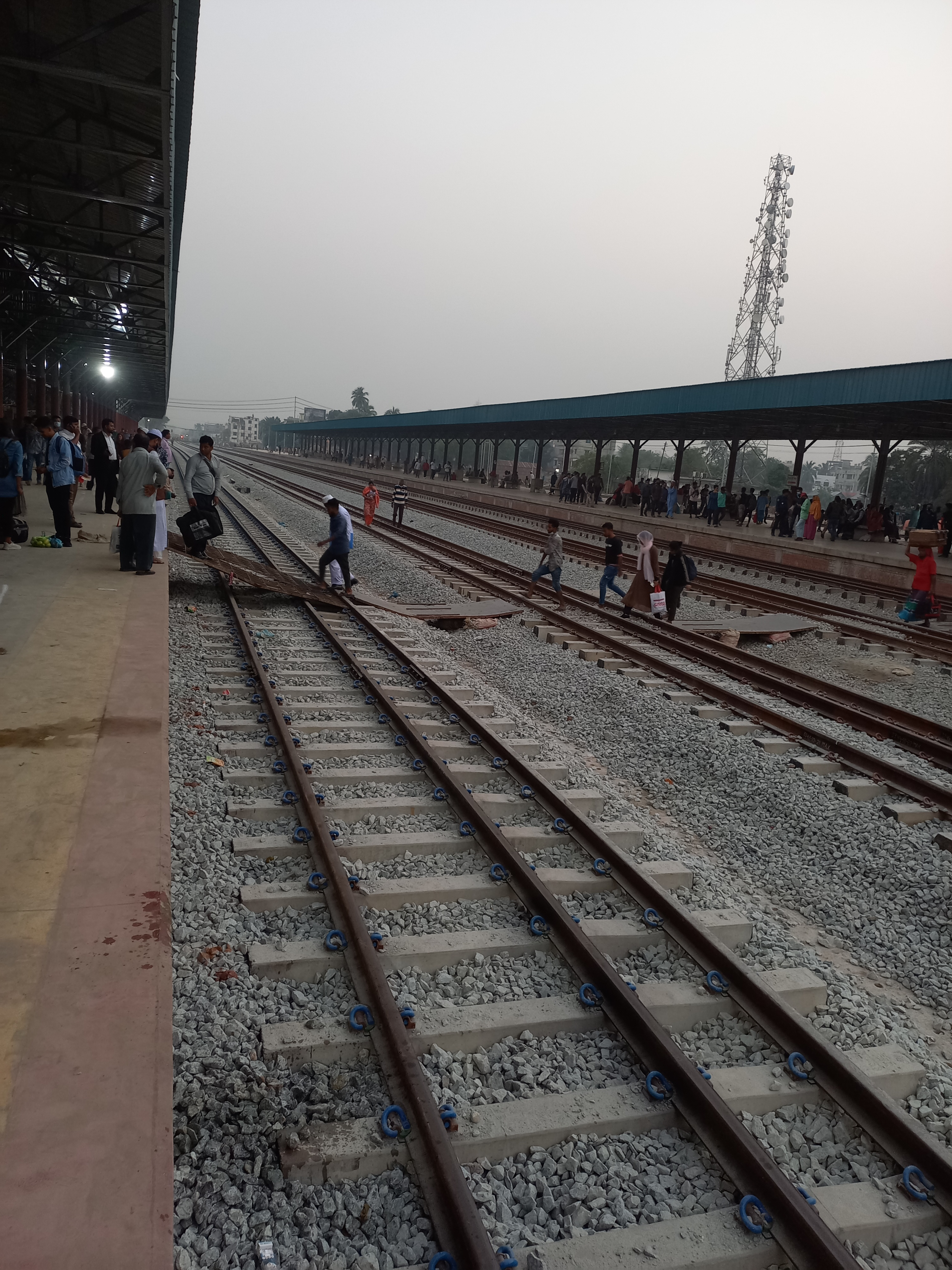

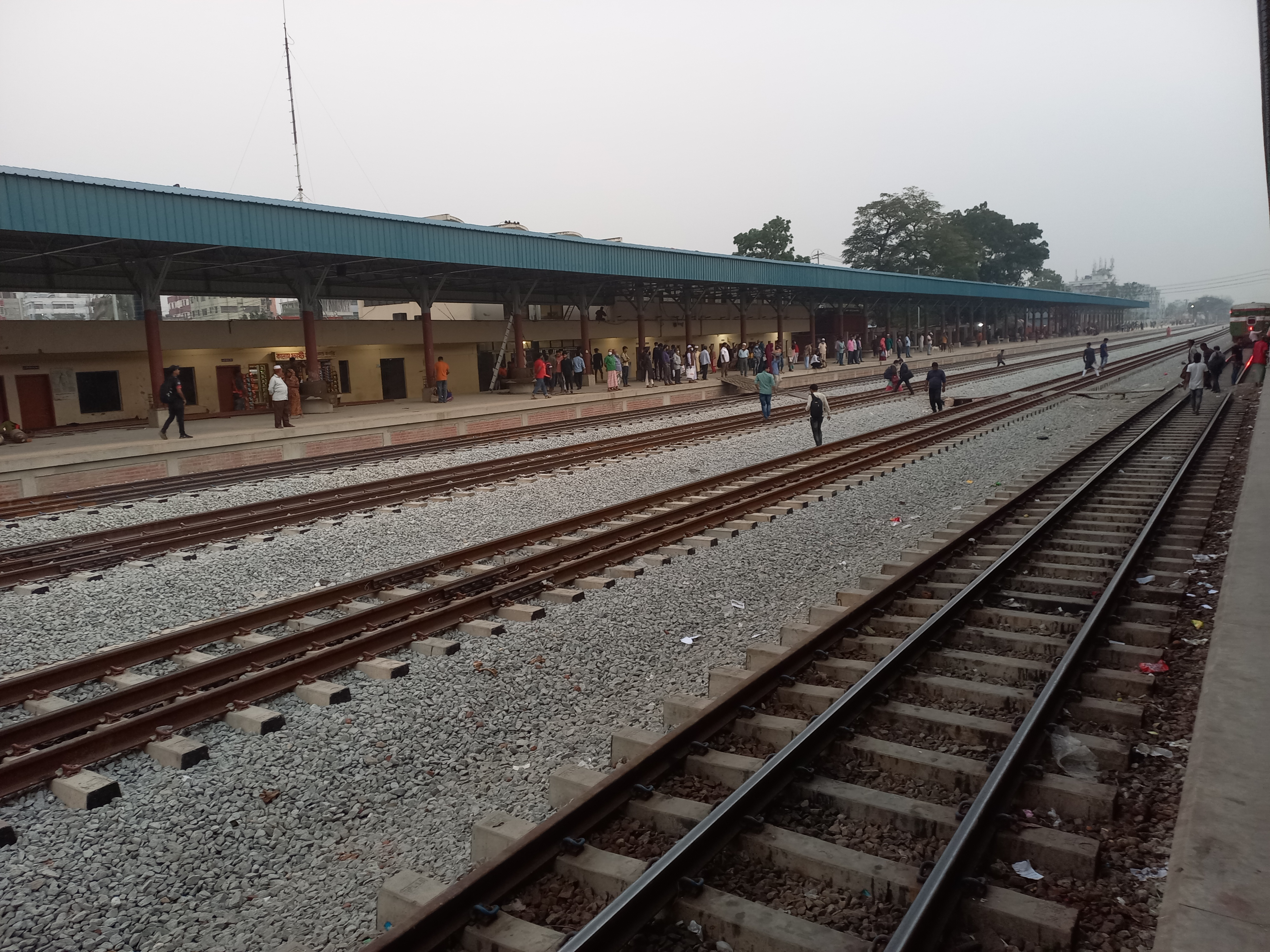

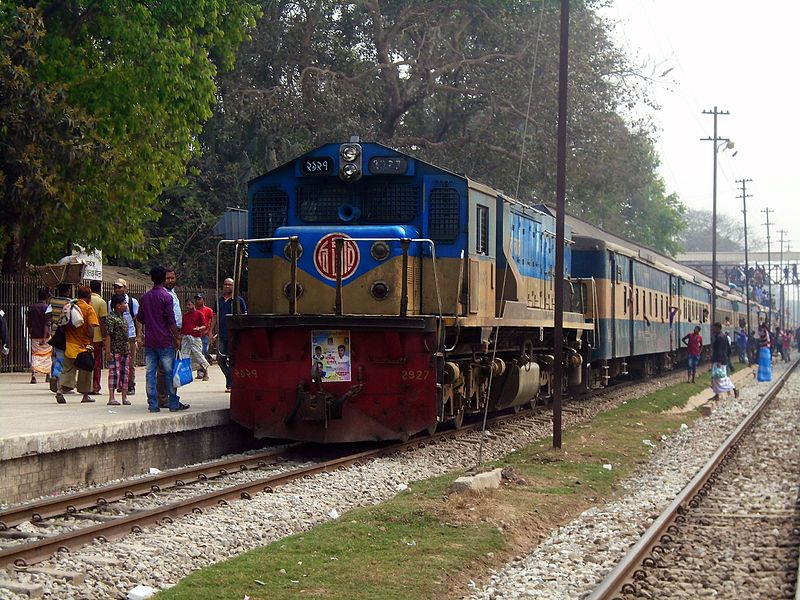

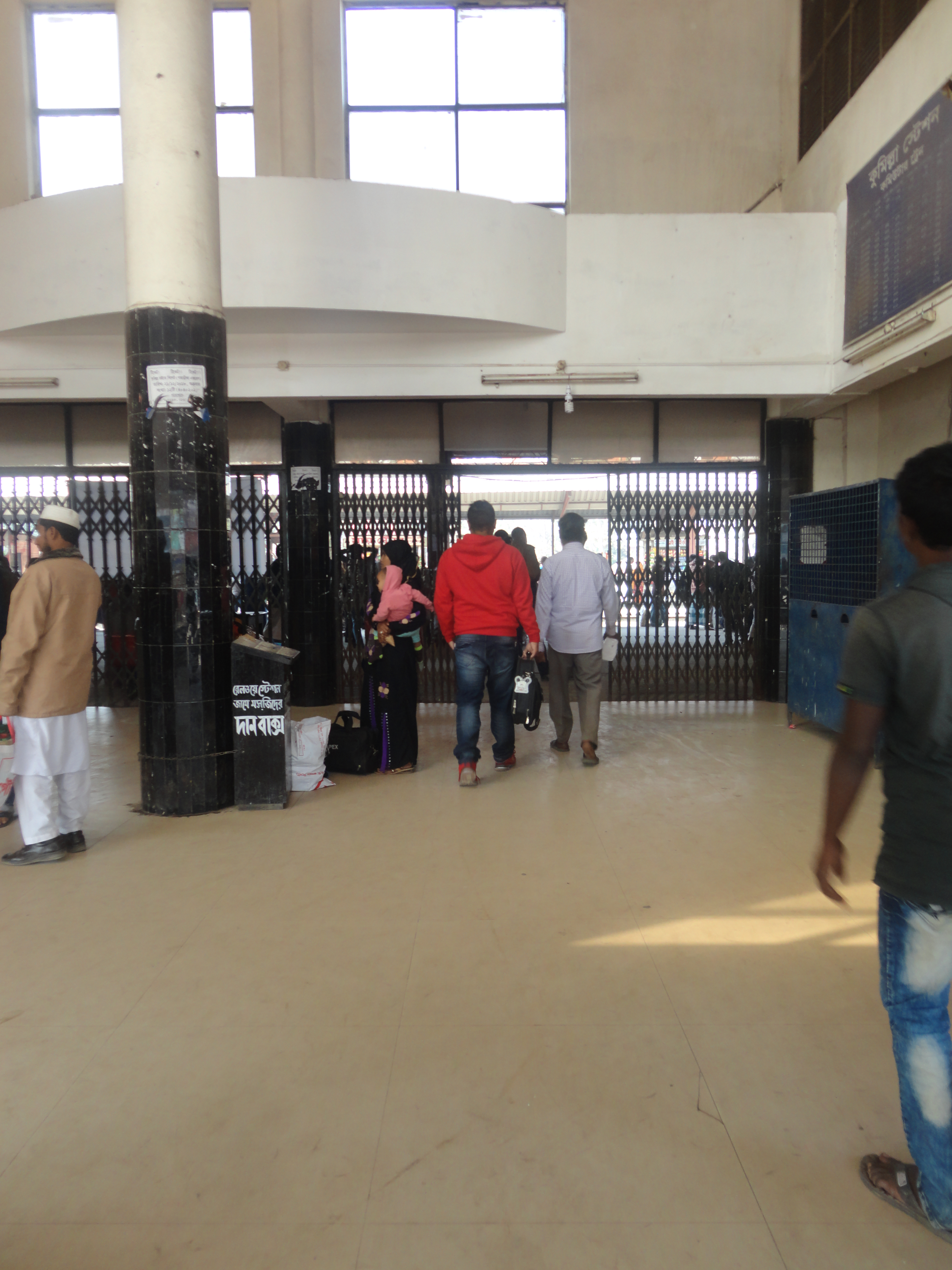
