= Cox's Bazar railway station =

Railway station in Cox's Bazar, Bangladesh

Cox's Bazar Railway Station কক্সবাজার রেলওয়ে স্টেশন
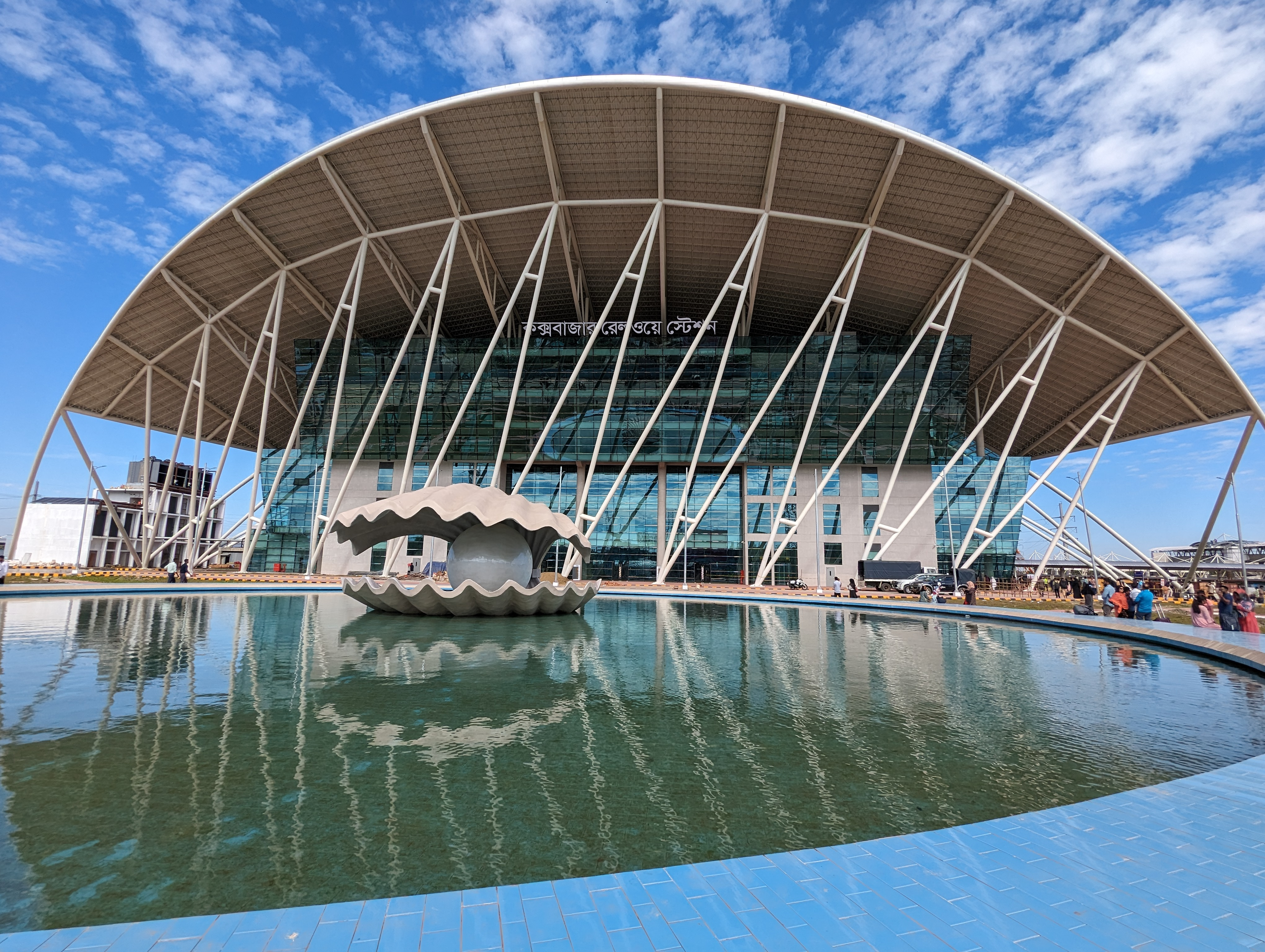
- Station terminal

General information
- Location: Railway Road, Chanderpara; Cox's Bazar; Bangladesh
- Coordinates: 21°25′44″N 92°00′54″E
- Owner: Ministry of Railways
- Operator: Bangladesh Railway
- Line: Chittagong–Cox's Bazar line
- Distance: 346 kilometres (215 mi) from Dhaka
- Platforms: 3
- Tracks: Dual gauge
- Train operators: Bangladesh Railway

Construction
- Structure type: Standard (on ground station)
- Parking: Yes
- Cycle facilities: Yes
- Accessible: Disabled access Computerized Ticketing Counters Luggage Checking System Food Plaza Kiosks WC Taxi Stand Public Transportation
- Architect: Mohammad Foyez Ullah
- Architectural style: Iconic

Other information
- Status: Operational
- Station code: CXBZR
- Zone(s): East Zone
- Division(s): Chittagong

History
- Opened: December 1, 2023; 2 years ago

Key dates
- Construction: 2021–2023
- Inaugurated: 11 November 2023

Services
Preceding station	Bangladesh Railway	Following station
Chittagong towards Kamalapur	Cox's Bazar Express	Terminus
Chittagong towards Kamalapur	Parjatak Express	Terminus
Ramu towards Chittagong	Shaikat Express	Terminus
Ramu towards Chittagong	Probal Express	Terminus
Route map
Location

Cox's Bazar Railway Station is a railway station in Bangladesh, situated near the bus terminal of the city of Cox's Bazar. The railway station was inaugurated on 11 November 2023 and is considered the first iconic railway station in the country.

== History ==
The Bangladesh Government planned to extend the rail track from Dohazari of Chittagong to Gundum of Bandarban. The trans-Asian railway network was to be connected to the proposed Ghumdhum railway station. The government also planned to build another railway track from the proposed Ramu railway station to Cox's Bazar to make another railway station in Cox's Bazar, in order to boost tourism in the city. The new railway line extended to Ghumdhum and the proposed railway station in Cox's Bazar was being built simultaneously. Construction started in August 2017. The architect of the station, Mohammad Foyez Ullah, took inspiration from the shape of an oyster for its exterior, which symbolizes the beach. The foundation stone of the station building was laid on 14 January 2021. Its construction cost is ৳214 crore. In January 2022, the construction of the railway station was 45% complete. Another 40% of the construction work was completed in March 2023. The station was inaugurated on 11 November 2023. It became operational for train services on 1 December 2023. However, it was on high risk of becoming drug trafficking hotspot as almost no necessary services for the security was functional there. On 4 August 2025, the authority installed an X-ray security scanner machine at the station. As of October 2025, it is not completely functional yet. Bangladesh Railway, the station's operator, has decided to invite tenders to hand over its management to a private operator.

== Layout ==
The station terminal has five floors with the top floor reserved for future use. The ground floor houses various government services, ticket counters, various shops, and other services. The first floor is the departure lounge. There are lifts, stairs, washrooms, baby care services, escalators, waiting lounges, lockers, tourist information desks, display centers for selling products, and prayer rooms. A footbridge for departure will also be attached to this floor. The second floor is mainly reserved for restaurants and shops. The third floor will be a hotel with recreational space for passengers. The hotel will have 39 rooms. The fourth floor is intended to be leased for offices and conferences.

== Issues ==
After the station opened, a black market syndicate has developed around it, collecting tickets at low prices, creating a crisis and selling them at higher prices, resulting in increased suffering among passengers. During the rainy season in 2024, rainwater seeped through the roof of the station and entered the building. Due to the lack of adequate security measures, incidents of theft of the station's assets and equipment have been occurring since the first half of 2025.

== Gallery ==
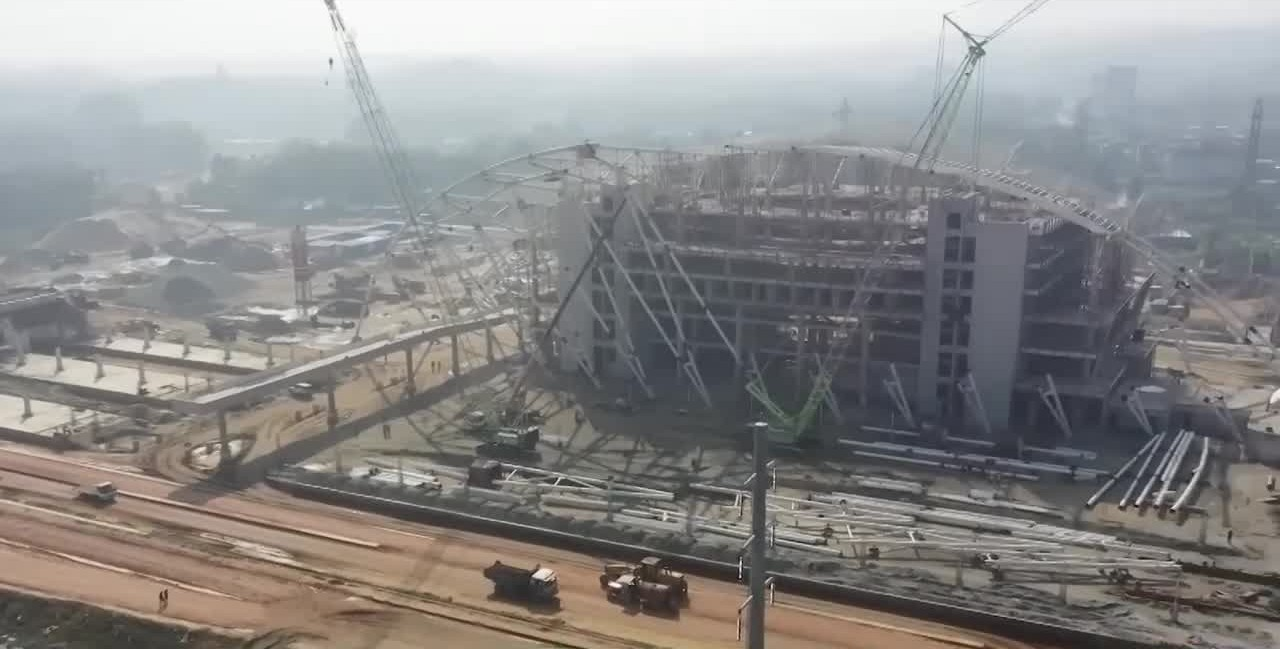
The construction of the station in January 2023

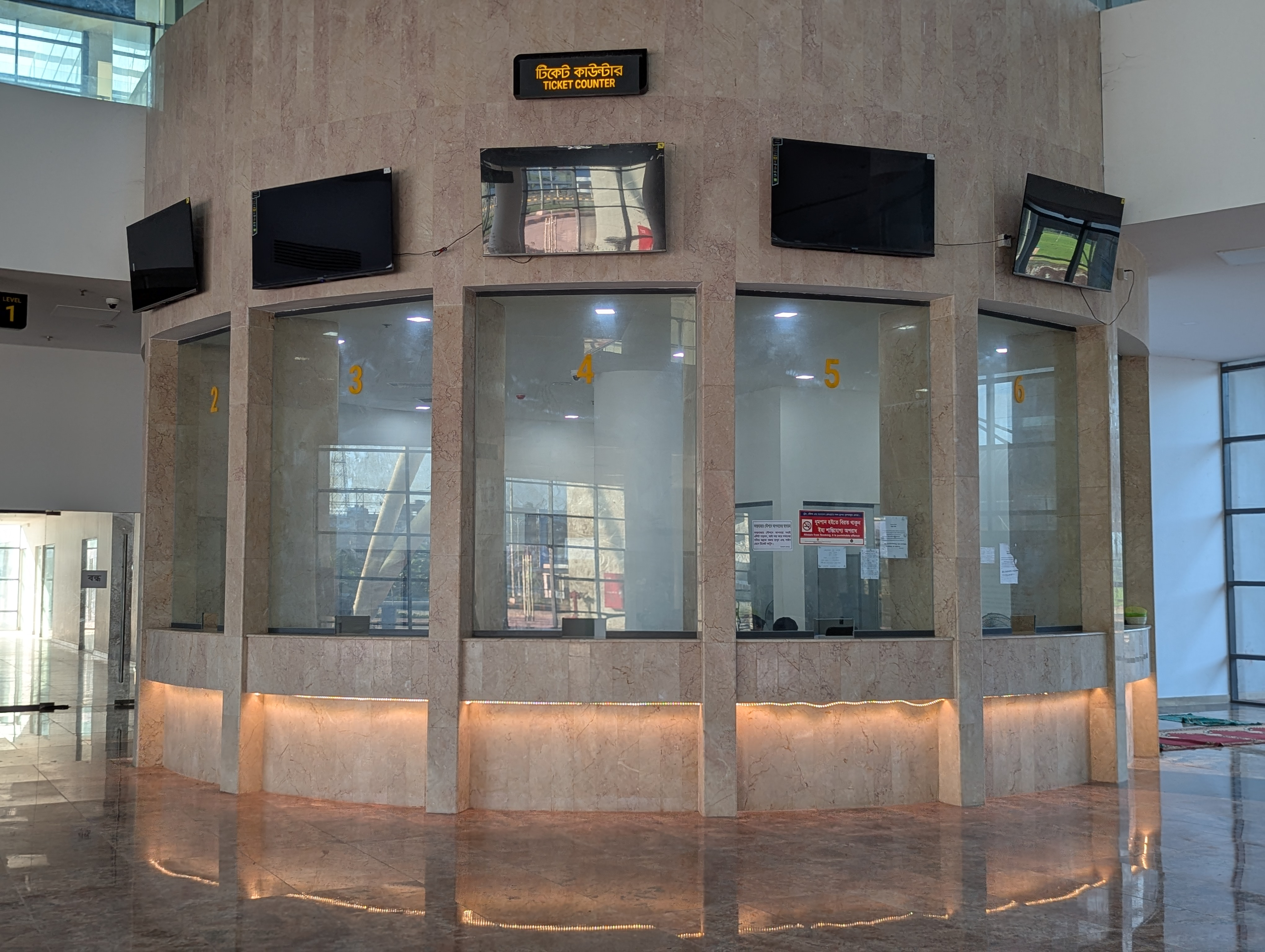
Ticket counter

Front side from south end

Front view

== See also ==
- Cox's Bazar Airport
- List of railway stations in Bangladesh
