= Mahanagar Express =

Intercity passenger train in Bangladesh

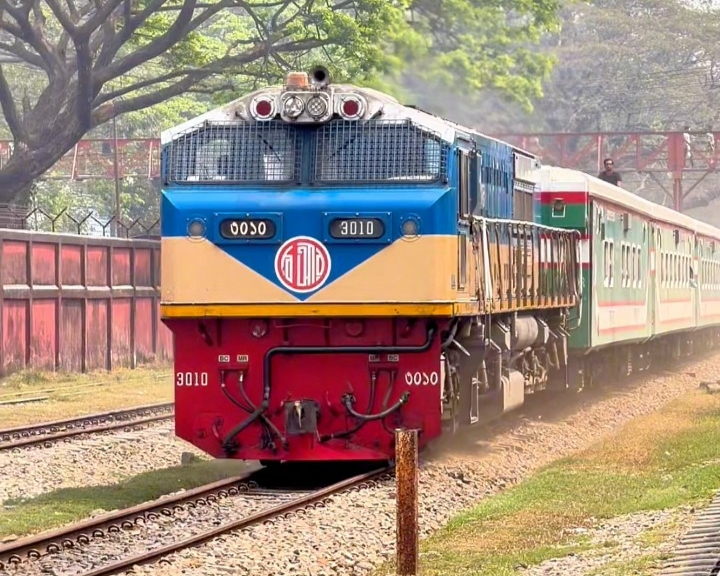

Overview
- Service type: Inter-city rail
- Status: Operating
- First service: 4 December 1985
- Current operator: East Zone (Bangladesh Railway)

Route
- Termini: Chattogram Railway Station; Kamalapur Railway Station
- Stops: 13
- Distance travelled: Approximately 320 kilometres
- Average journey time: 6 hours, 30 minutes
- Train number: 721/722

On-board services
- Classes: AC Berth, Snigdha, Shovon Chair
- Disabled access: Restricted due to age of rolling stock, not suitable for wheelchairs
- Sleeping arrangements: Yes (AC Berth)
- Catering facilities: Yes
- Observation facilities: No
- Entertainment facilities: No
- Baggage facilities: Overhead racks

Technical
- Rolling stock: Mixed coaches (PT Inka built and Chinese built coaches)
- Track gauge: 1,000 mm (3 ft 3 3/8 in)
- Operating speed: 80 kilometers/hour
- Rake maintenance: Pahartali Railway Yard, Chattogram

Mahanagar Express (Train No. 721/722) is an intercity passenger train in Bangladesh, which runs between Chattogram Railway Station in Chattogram District and Kamalapur Railway Station in Dhaka District. The train was inaugurated on 4 December 1985. In 2013, the train's code was changed from 701/702 to 721/722. Since 701/702 were assigned to the Suborno Express.
