= Brahmanbaria railway station =

Railway station in Brahmanbaria District, Bangladesh

Brahmanbaria ব্রাহ্মণবাড়িয়া
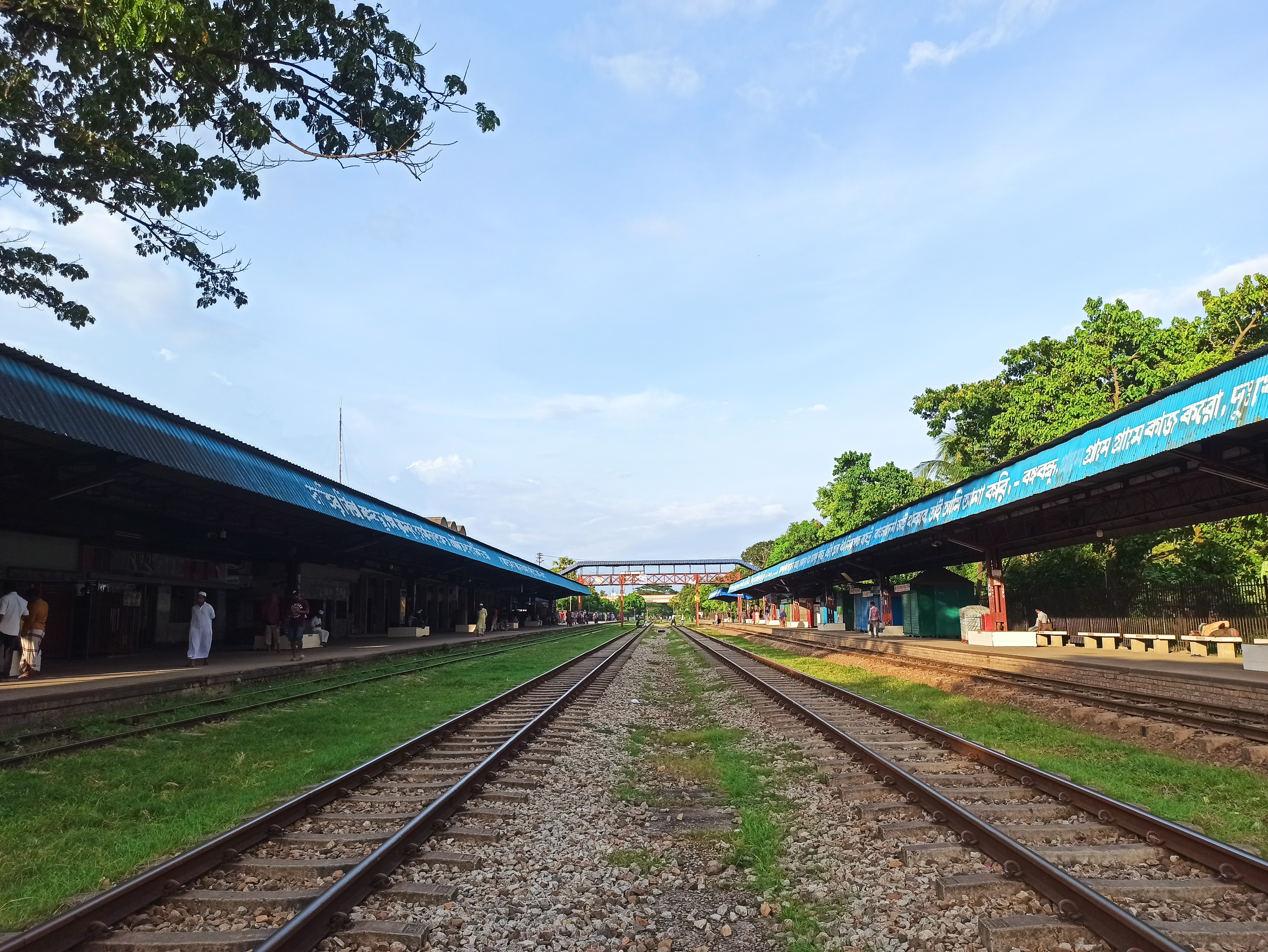
- Brahmanbaria Railway Station

General information
- Location: Brahmanbaria, Brahmanbaria District, Chattogram Division; Bangladesh
- Owner: Bangladesh Railway
- Line: Tongi–Bhairab–Akhaura line
- Platforms: 3
- Tracks: 4

Construction
- Structure type: Standard (on ground station)
- Parking: Yes
- Cycle facilities: Yes
- Accessible: Yes

Other information
- Status: Opened
- Station code: BHRA
- Zone(s): East Zone
- Division(s): Dhaka

History
- Opened: 1914; 112 years ago

Services
Preceding station	Bangladesh Railway	Following station
Talshahar towards Tongi Junction	Tongi–Bhairab–Akhaura	Paghachang towards Akhaura Junction
Location

Brahmanbaria railway station is a railway station located on Tongi–Bhairab–Akhaura line. The station is also located in Brahmanbaria. It is one of the major station in Brahmanbaria District.
