= Paharika Express =

Intercity train running from Chittagong to Sylhet in Bangladesh

Overview
- Service type: Inter-city rail
- Status: Operating
- First service: 16 May 1986
- Current operator: East Zone (Bangladesh Railway)
- Daily ridership: 377 kilometers (234 miles)

Route
- Termini: Chattogram railway station Sylhet railway station
- Stops: 16
- Train number: 719-720

On-board services
- Classes: Cabin, Snigdha, Shovon Chair
- Seating arrangements: Yes
- Sleeping arrangements: Yes
- Catering facilities: Yes
- Observation facilities: Yes
- Entertainment facilities: Yes
- Baggage facilities: Yes

Technical
- Track gauge: Meter gauge
- Rake sharing: Udayan Express

Paharika Express (Train No. 719/720) is an intercity train running from Chittagong to Sylhet under Bangladesh Railway. Paharika Express was the first intercity train to be launched on the Chittagong-Sylhet route, which was inaugurated on 16 May 1986. Apart from Paharika Express, Udayan Express also runs on the Chittagong-Sylhet route.

== Schedule ==
(Bangladesh Railway timetable is subject to change. You are requested to check the latest timetable by visiting the official website of Bangladesh Railway. The following timetable is as per the 52nd timetable of Bangladesh Railway, effective from 14 February 2022.)

== Stopover ==
- Feni
- Nangalkot
- Laksam Junction
- Comilla
- Kasba
- Akhaura Junction
- Azampur
- Harashpur
- Noapara
- Shayestaganj
- Sreemangal
- Bhanugach
- Shamsernagar
- Kulaura
- Baramchal
- Maizgaon
