= Narsingdi railway station =

Railway station in Narsingdi, Bangladesh

Narsingdi নরসিংদী
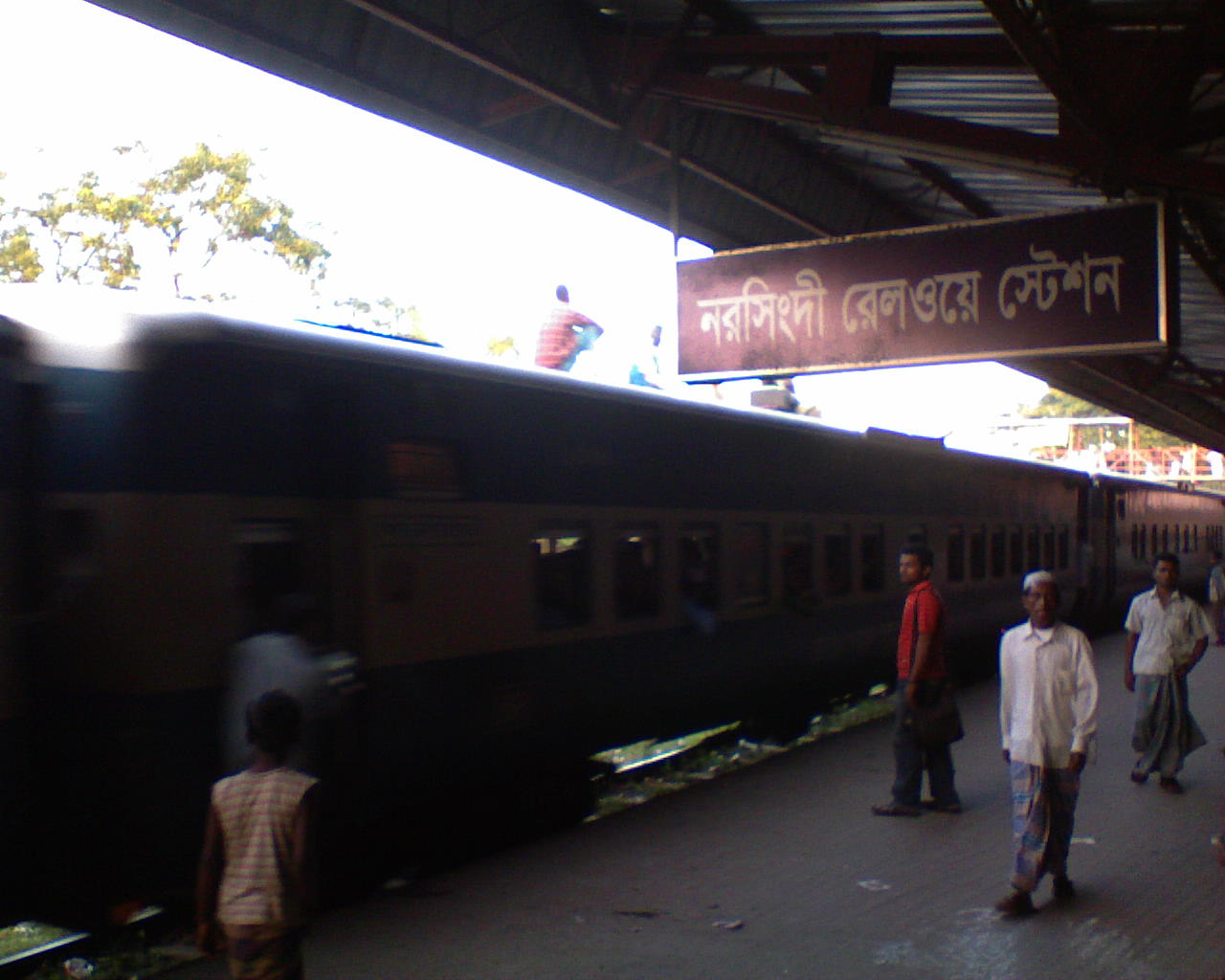

General information
- Location: Narsingdi; Bangladesh
- Coordinates: 23.930984°N 90.7190593°E
- System: Bangladesh Railway Station
- Line: Tongi–Bhairab–Akhaura line
- Platforms: 3
- Tracks: Metre Gauge

Construction
- Structure type: Standard (on ground station)

Other information
- Status: Functioning
- Station code: NRC
- Zone(s): East Zone
- Division(s): Dhaka

History
- Opened: 1914

Services
Preceding station	Bangladesh Railway	Following station
Jinardi	Line; Tongi–Bhairab–Akhaura	Amirganj
Location

Narsingdi railway station is a railway station located in Narsingdi, Narsingdi District, Bangladesh.

== History ==
This station is a former junction station and the railway was built in 1970 from here to Madanganj in Narayanganj. The line was closed in 1977 due to traffic problems. The railway line was removed in 1984. which has been used as a roadway since 2004.
