= Ramu, Cox's Bazar =

Village in Bangladesh

Coordinates: 21°26′N 92°06′E

Ramu is a village in Bangladesh. It is the headquarters of Ramu Upazila, Cox's Bazar District. It is located on the Baghkhali River, approximately sixteen miles from Cox's Bazar, between Cox's Bazar and Chittagong.

Ramu has Mosque, pagodas, Buddhist monasteries, and a bronze Buddha statue that is 13-feet in height.

== Villagers ==
Ramu villagers are craftspeople that produce handicrafts, and are also weavers.

== See also ==
- List of villages in Bangladesh
