= Chattogram railway station =

Railway station in Chattogram District, Bangladesh

Chattogram চট্টগ্রাম
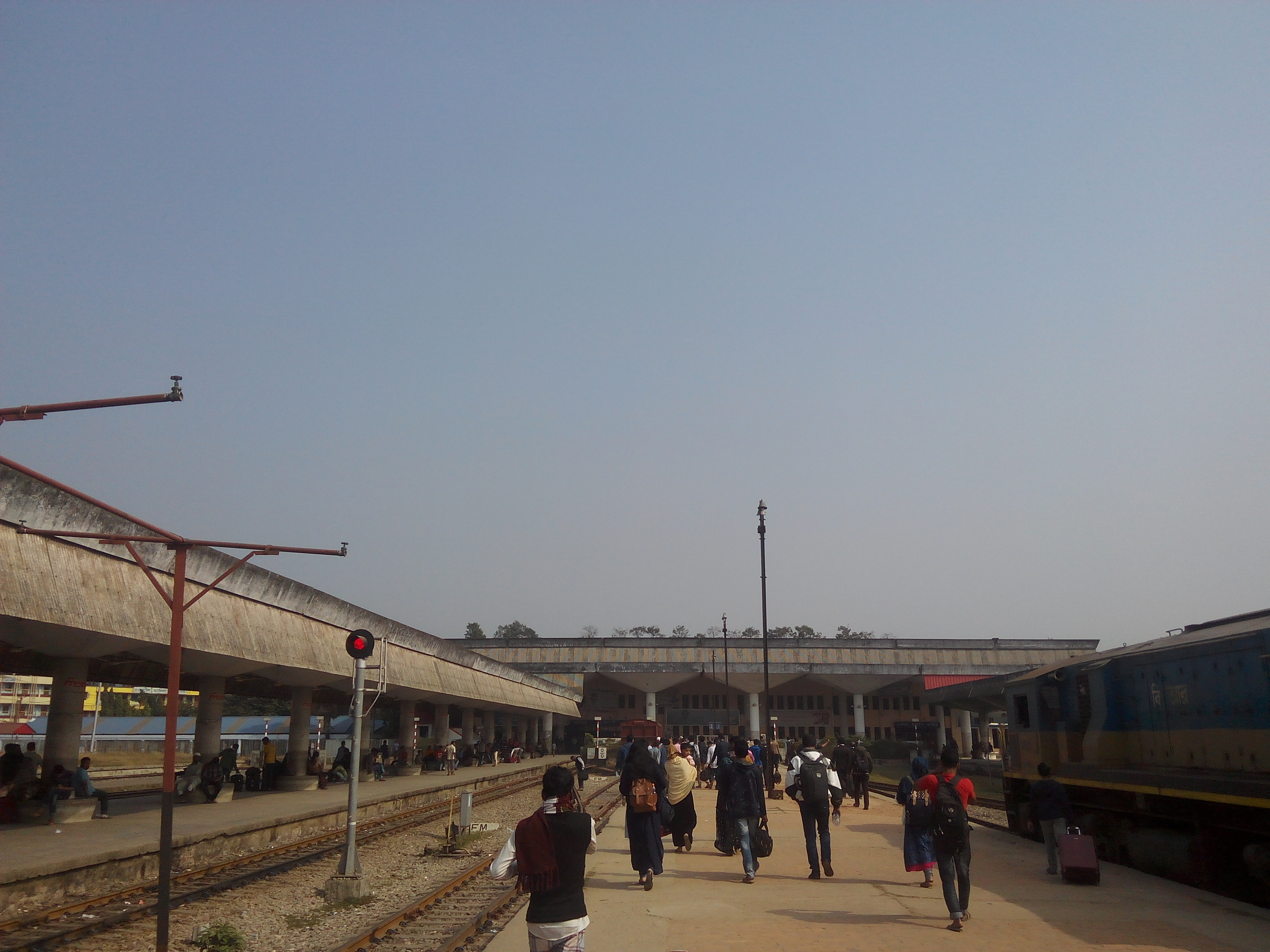

General information
- Other names: Chittagong railway station
- Location: Battoli, Station Road, New Market; Chittagong District; Chittagong Division; Bangladesh
- Coordinates: 22.3338°N 91.8301°E
- Operator: Bangladesh Railway
- Line: Akhaura–Laksam–Chittagong line
- Platforms: 9
- Tracks: Metre gauge

Construction
- Parking: Yes
- Cycle facilities: Yes
- Accessible: Disabled access Computerized Ticketing Counters Luggage Checking System Food Plaza Kiosks WC Taxi Stand Public Transportation

Other information
- Status: Active
- Station code: CTG
- Zone(s): East Zone
- Division(s): Chattogram

History
- Opened: November 7, 1896
- Rebuilt: 1991-1995

Services
Preceding station	Bangladesh Railway	Following station
Chittagong Junction	Line; Akhaura–Laksam–Chittagong line	Terminus
SRV	Line; Chittagong Port loop line	Terminus
Location
- Location within Bangladesh

Chattogram Railway Station is a railway station in Bangladesh, situated at Battoli, Station Road of Chattogram District. It is one of the largest railway stations of the country. This station has an old and a new terminal.

== Old terminal ==
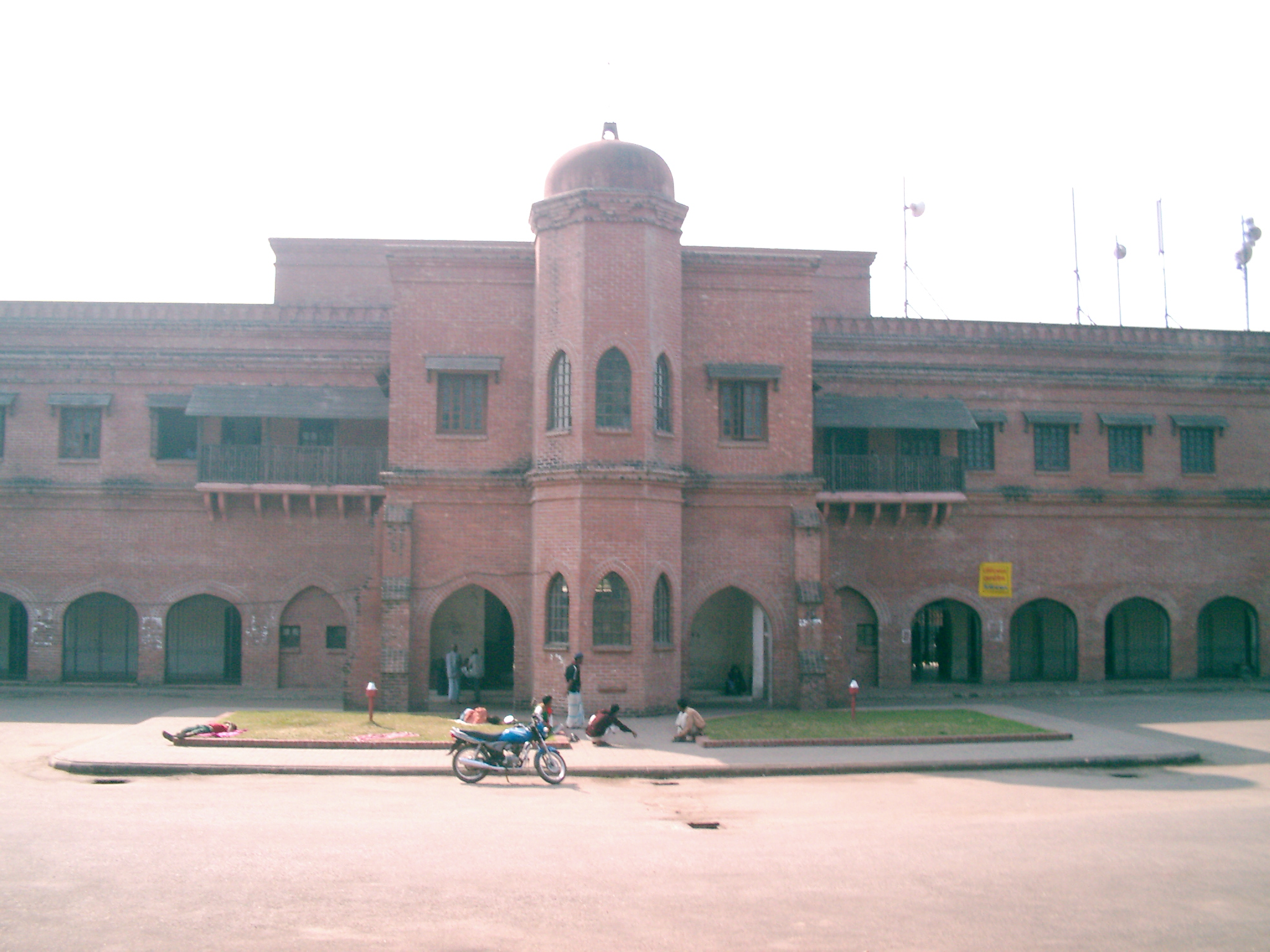
Old Terminal

The old terminal was constructed during the British era. It comprises a two-storied 56.24 m long and 10.37 m wide station building, which was constructed on November 7, 1896.

== New terminal ==
In 1991, construction of a new terminal and modernization of Chittagong Railway Station started and the new terminal was opened in 1995. In 2015, remodeling of Chittagong Railway Station started and Platform no-8,9 was introduced. The new terminal was constructed beside the old terminal.

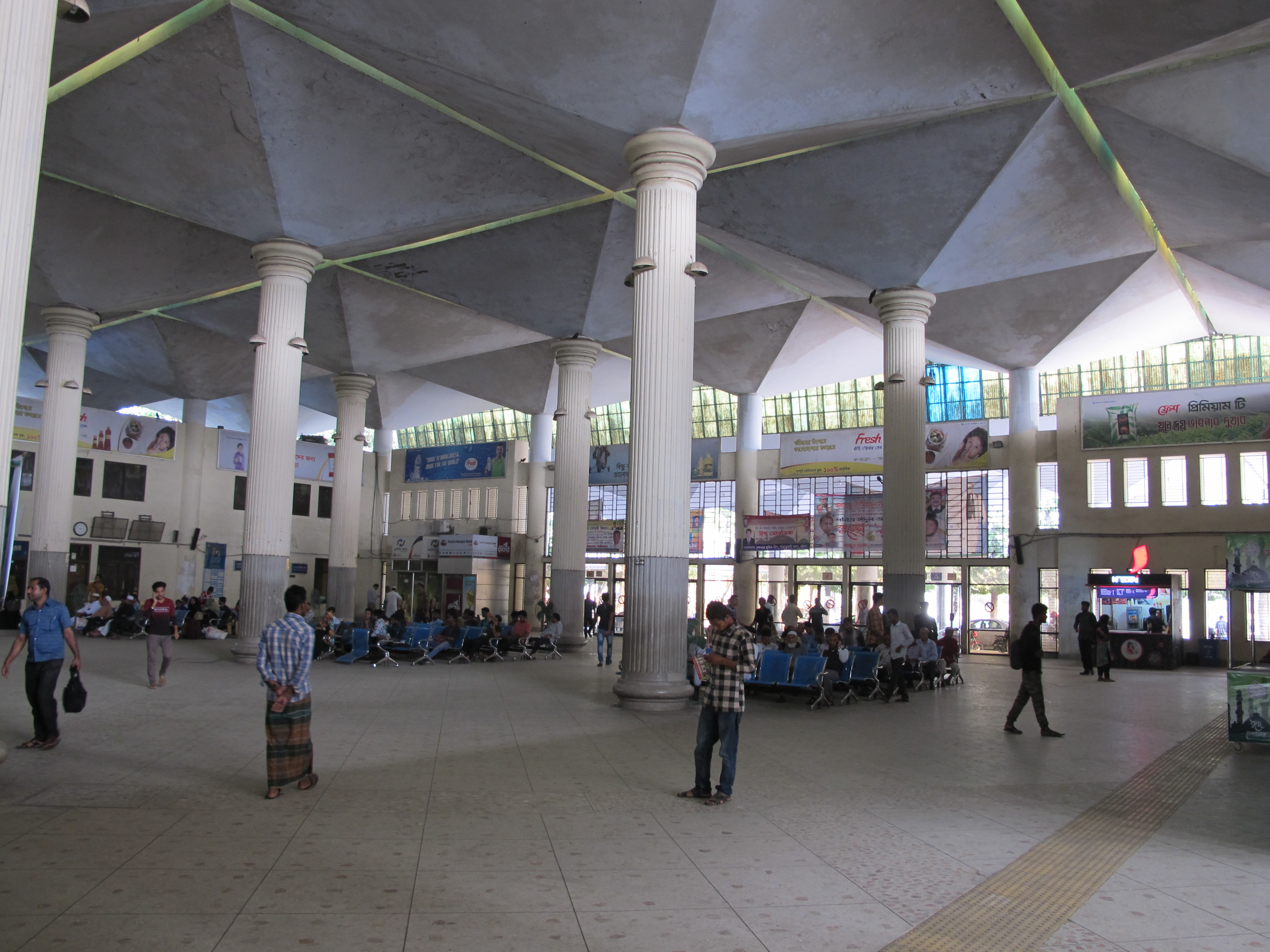
New Terminal

== Operational trains ==
The following passenger trains run from Chittagong Railway Station along with many freight trains:

1. Subarna Express
2. Mohanagar Provati/Godhuli Express
3. Paharika Express
4. Mohanagar Express
5. Udayan Express
6. Meghna Express
7. Turna Express
8. Bijoy Express
9. Sonar Bangla Express
10. Dhaka-Chittagong Mail
11. Karnaphuli Express
12. Sagarika Express
13. Mymensingh Express
14. Chattala Express
15. Nazirhat Commuter
16. 111/112/113/114 local
17. 123/124 local
18. Cox's Bazar Express
19. Parjotak Express
20. Saikat Express
21. Probal Express

== See also ==
- List of railway stations in Bangladesh
