= Chittagong–Cox's Bazar line =

Railway line of Bangladesh

Overview
- Native name: চট্টগ্রাম–কক্সবাজার রেলপথ
- Status: Operational
- Owner: Bangladesh Railway
- Locale: Chittagong Division, Bangladesh
- Termini: Chittagong Junction; Cox's Bazar
- Stations: 24

Service
- Type: Inter-city rail
- Operator: East Zone

History
- Opened: 1929 (Chittagong–Sholosahar); 1930 (Sholosahar–Nazir Hat); 1931 (Sholosahar–Dohazari); 2023 (Dohazari–Cox's Bazar)

Technical
- Line length: 102 km (63 mi)
- Character: Passenger and freight
- Track gauge: Dual gauge; 1,000 mm (3 ft 3 3/8 in)
- Operating speed: 100 km/h (62 mph)

Chittagong–Cox's Bazar line is a railway line in Bangladesh, in the East Zone of Bangladesh Railway.

== History ==
The Assam Bengal Railway completed the construction of the Chittagong–Sholosohor railway line in 1929. The following year they constructed a railway line from Sholosahar Junction to Nazirhat and in 1931, the following year, another railway line was constructed from the same junction to Dohazari. In 2010, a railway construction project was taken up from Dohazari to Cox's Bazar via Ramu. The length of railway line under construction is 128 km. A target was then taken to complete the project within 3 years of initiation which was later extended by another 5 years till 2018. However, the contractor is appointed in the year preceding the target year. The construction of the railway line started in July 2018. The railway line's completion date was pushed back due to the August 2023 flood damage. Locals and experts blamed the rail project and bad water management practices for the high flood damages.

== Ramu–Ghumdhum section ==
As railway track from Dohazari to Cox's Bazar has been started, it is proposed to be extended to Ghumdhum on the Bangladesh–Myanmar border for linking with Myanmar Railways as part of the Trans-Asian Railway.
