= Dohazari =

- Municipal area
- Location within Bangladesh
- Coordinates: 22°09′46″N 92°04′22″E

Population (2011)
  - Total: 40,147

Dohazari is a municipal area in southeast Bangladesh. It is in Dohazari municipality of Chandanaish Upazila, Chittagong District.

== History ==
The Mughal Subahdar Shaista Khan expelled the Arakanese from Chittagong in 1666 and established Mughal rule. After the Arakanese expulsion, Islamabad as the area came to be known, made great strides in economic progress. In 1666, Buzurg Umed Khan the son of the Subahdar Shaistha Khan led the invasion of the Mughal army as chief of the campaign to expel the Arakanese.In this invasion against the Arakanese, there were thirteen Mughal army commanders, consists of both Mansabdars and Army Generals. They invaded Chittagong and won a vast territory starting from modern day Feni to Cox's Bazar. After the invasion the Mansabdars and the military force settled there to ensure the security and ruling of the territory.

One Mansabdar among them was Rajkumar Lakhsman Singh Hazari. His original name was Lakhsman Singh, he was a Gaur Rajput Prince and came from one of the Suryavanshi lineage Rajput ruling family of Rajputana under Mughal territory. He was a Mansabdar of Umra/Omrah Hazari rank in Mughal Imperial Court (commander of two thousand cavalry and soldiers including artillery) and this designation title, Hazari was added with his name. Rajkumar Lakhsman Singh and a mughal general Adhu Khan's joint force were responsible for the conquest of the southern area, they made their conquest till Ramu, Cox's Bazar. After dividing the territory, Lakhsman Singh Hazari was awarded a Mansabdari of South Chittagong under Mughal authority, it was a territory starting from Hashimpur, few miles before of Dohazari to nearly the middle of Cox's Bazar. Lakshman Singh Hazari was the founder of Dohazari. He established a fort in Dohazari and Dohazari was the centre of his Mansabdari. It is said that Dohazari was named because there was an army camp of two thousand soldiers (fort & including areas), this was Lakhsman Singh Hazari's command post. On the other hand, another possibility for the naming was, the actual rank title of Lakhsman Singh was Do Hazari; which meant commander of two thousand soldier or sowar (cavalry). The similarity of the name indicates that Lakhsman Singh Hazari's title was used for naming this region.

The Hazari Family or the descendants of Lakhsman Singh Hazari are still living in Dohazari; during Mughal period they were the hereditary Mughal Mansabdars of Dohazari with the title of Maharaj Babu and during British era they were the Zamindars of Dohazari. Now the Hazari Family own Hazari Estate, which is based on Land properties, Commercial Space, shopping centre, Housing estates and Industrial places. In social service activities, Hazari family donated and helped for establishing two schools, one college, mosque, temples at Dohazari. The family donated a large area of lands for establishing two schools and made strong role on establishing a hospital in Dohazari. Late Babu Bhagirath Singh Hazari was the pioneer of these social service activities. Lakhsman Singh Hazari was the founder of Dohazari and his descendant Bhagirath Singh Hazari was the pioneer and architect of making 'Dohazari' a city. Bhagirath Singh Hazari made the first attempt and made strong steps to make Dohazari a city.

The family made a great influence for the development of the area, as a result, Dohazari is now the most influential business centre and a municipality of South Chittagong.

== Transport ==
In 2011, it is the railhead for Bangladesh Railway, on an extension of the Akhaura-Laksam-Chittagong Line, in the direction of Cox's Bazar. In 2011, it is proposed to extend the railways by 100 kilometres (62 mi) to Cox's Bazar. The line to Cox's Bazar was inaugurated in 2023.
