= Suborno Express =

Intercity passenger train in Bangladesh

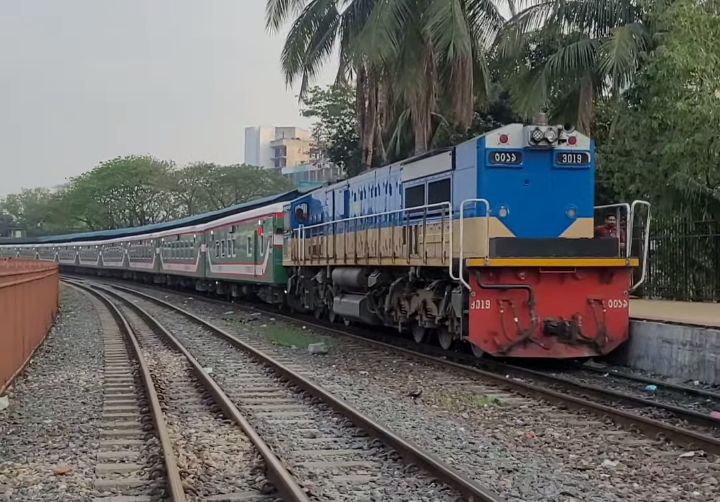
- Suborno Express with BR Locomotive 3019 at Dhaka Airport Station

Overview
- Service type: Inter-city rail
- Status: Operating
- Locale: Dhaka and Chittagong
- First service: 14 April 1998
- Current operator: Bangladesh Railway
- Website: http://www.railway.gov.bd/

Route
- Termini: Dhaka; Chattogram
- Stops: 3
- Average journey time: 5 hours & 20 minutes
- Service frequency: 6 days a week except Monday
- Train number: 701/702
- Line used: Dhaka - Tongi Section Tongi - Bhairab Bazar Section Bhairab Bazar - Akhaura Section Akhaura - Laksham Section Laksham - Chattogram Section

On-board services
- Classes: F_Seat AC_S; S_Chair Snigdha
- Disabled access: Yes (Wheelchair door available at the ends of the train)
- Catering facilities: On-board dining car
- Observation facilities: No
- Entertainment facilities: No
- Baggage facilities: Overhead racks
- Other facilities: Prayer room at the Power Car with ablution facilities

Technical
- Rolling stock: One 3000 Class Locomotive; 5 AC Chair Coaches (Snigdha); 6 Non-AC Chair Coaches (S_Seat / Shovon Chair); 3 AC Sleeper Coaches with seating facilities (AC_S / Business Class); 1 Non-AC Sleeper Coach (F_Seat / First Class Seat); 2 Dining Cars at each end with attached guard brakes; 1 Generator Car with praying room facilities.
- Track gauge: 1,000 mm (3 ft 3 3/8 in)
- Operating speed: Averages at 80 kilometers/hour
- Track owner: Bangladesh Railway

Suborno Express (Train no. 701/702) is an intercity train of Bangladesh Railway which runs between Dhaka (the capital of Bangladesh) and Chittagong. Suborno Express is considered one of the prestigious trains of Bangladesh Railway since it is the first luxurious non-stop train in the country still in operation. The train connects the capital and the largest city of the country, Dhaka to the second largest and port city of Chittagong of Bangladesh.

== History ==
Suborno Express made its first inaugural run on 14 April 1998 with allocated train no. 701(Up)/702(Down). It was introduced as a nonstop inter-city train that offers luxurious and fast service. Since inauguration, Suborno Express has always been the first train to get the new coaches imported by Bangladesh - as seen with the newly imported coaches from Wagon Pars of Iran in 1998, CRRC built coaches of China in 2006 and Sung Sing Rolling Stock Technology (SSRST) built coaches - imported in 2023. No standing tickets (where passengers are issued tickets with no available seats - a common practice in most other trains in Bangladesh Railway to handle more passengers than available seats) are available for this train - making it one of the few trains with all seating passengers in the Bangladesh Railway fleet. The train is popular among the urban middle-class and upper-class demographic of Bangldesh.

== Schedule ==
The train departs Chattogram railway station at 7:30 AM (Bangladesh Standard Time) and arrives in Dhaka railway station at 12:20PM bearing the code 701. On the return trip, it departs Dhaka at 4:30 PM and arrives in Chattogram railway station at 9:50PM bearing the code 702. This train runs six days a week, except for its off-day on Monday.

== Coaches ==
The train currently runs with South Korean Sung Sing Rolling Stock Technology (SSRST) built coaches bearing Red-Green livery. The number of coaches varies. Sometimes the train pulls up to 22 coaches if there is compelling demand. The train has:

- 5 AC Chair Coaches (Snigdha)
- 6 Non-AC Chair Coaches (S_Seat / Shovon Chair)
- 3 AC Sleeper Coaches with seating facilities (AC_S / Business Class)
- 1 Non-AC Sleeper Coach (F_Seat / First Class Seat)
- 2 Dining Cars at each end with attached guard brakes
- 1 Generator Car with praying room facilities.

Prior to introducing the South Korean coaches, Chinese built coaches imported from CRRC in 2006 were used. Even before that the train ran with air-brake coaches built by Wagon Pars - imported from Iran in 1998. Later, due to maintenance problems, Iranian air-brake coaches were replaced with newly imported Chinese coaches in 2007.

== Locomotive ==
Suborno Express is hauled by Bangladesh Railway Class 3000 locomotives of Bangladesh Railway. However, due to the unreliable nature of these locomotives - it is not impossible - however rare - to see Suborno Express to be hauled by older Bangladesh Railway Class 2900 locomotives.

== Passenger interest ==
Passengers usually prefer traveling aboard Suborno Express for its non-stop service. Also the train has more AC carriages than any other trains that run between Dhaka and Chittagong.

== Accidents and incidents ==
Date	Location	Type	Details	Casualties & Losses	Aftermath
7 May 2013	Chattogram Railway Station	Suspected Arson	Miscreants torched five carriages - including two AC coaches - of the train at 4:50 AM; about 2 hours before departure while standing idle at the platform of Chattogram Railway Station.	No casualties since the train was empty and it was early in the morning. 5 coaches including 2 AC coaches were completely burned down. Estimated loss was about 20 Lakh Taka	Police detained 2 suspects from the station on suspicion of links to the incident. The train left the station after some delay with replaced carriages.
16 March 2018	Near Banani Railway Station	Electric Short Circuit	The rubber pads between two coaches caught fire from a suspected electrical short circuit while near Mohakhali, Dhaka. The train stopped at Banani Railway Station and the fire was subsequently extinguished.	No casualties since the fire broke out at the rear end of the carriages where 2 coaches are linked and swift actions were taken to douse the fire.	The train left Banani Railway Station after a 45 minutes delay.
2 March 2020	Laksam Railway Junction Station	Onboard Fire	One of the coaches caught fire - from a suspected case of friction between the train wheel and spring - while on its way to Chittagong.	No casualties since the passengers of the effected coach were moved to other coaches and the fire was subsequently extinguished.	The train left Laksam Railway Junction Station after inspection with a delay of 1 hour.
13 July 2024	Narsingdi Railway Station	Runover	A mother and her young daughter were waiting on the platform when the Dhaka-bound Suborno Express approached. At the sound of its horn, the child accidentally stepped onto the tracks. The mother rushed forward with her other child in her arms to save her, but both were struck by the train and killed.	2 casualties with another 1 (another daughter on the arms of the perished mother) injured.	No information.
26 November 2024	Burichang Upazilla, Cumilla	Collision	Six passengers lost their lives and two others were injured when the train collided with an autorickshaw at the unprotected Kalikapur rail crossing in Burichang Upazila, Cumilla. The autorickshaw was dragged nearly half a kilometer by the train, leaving the victims' bodies severely damaged.	6 casualties and 2 others injured. The bodies of the deceased were mutilated by the accident. The autorickshaw completely torn into pieces and minor damage was caused to the locomotive.	No information.
