= Bangladesh Railway Class 3000 =

Class of diesel-electric locomotive

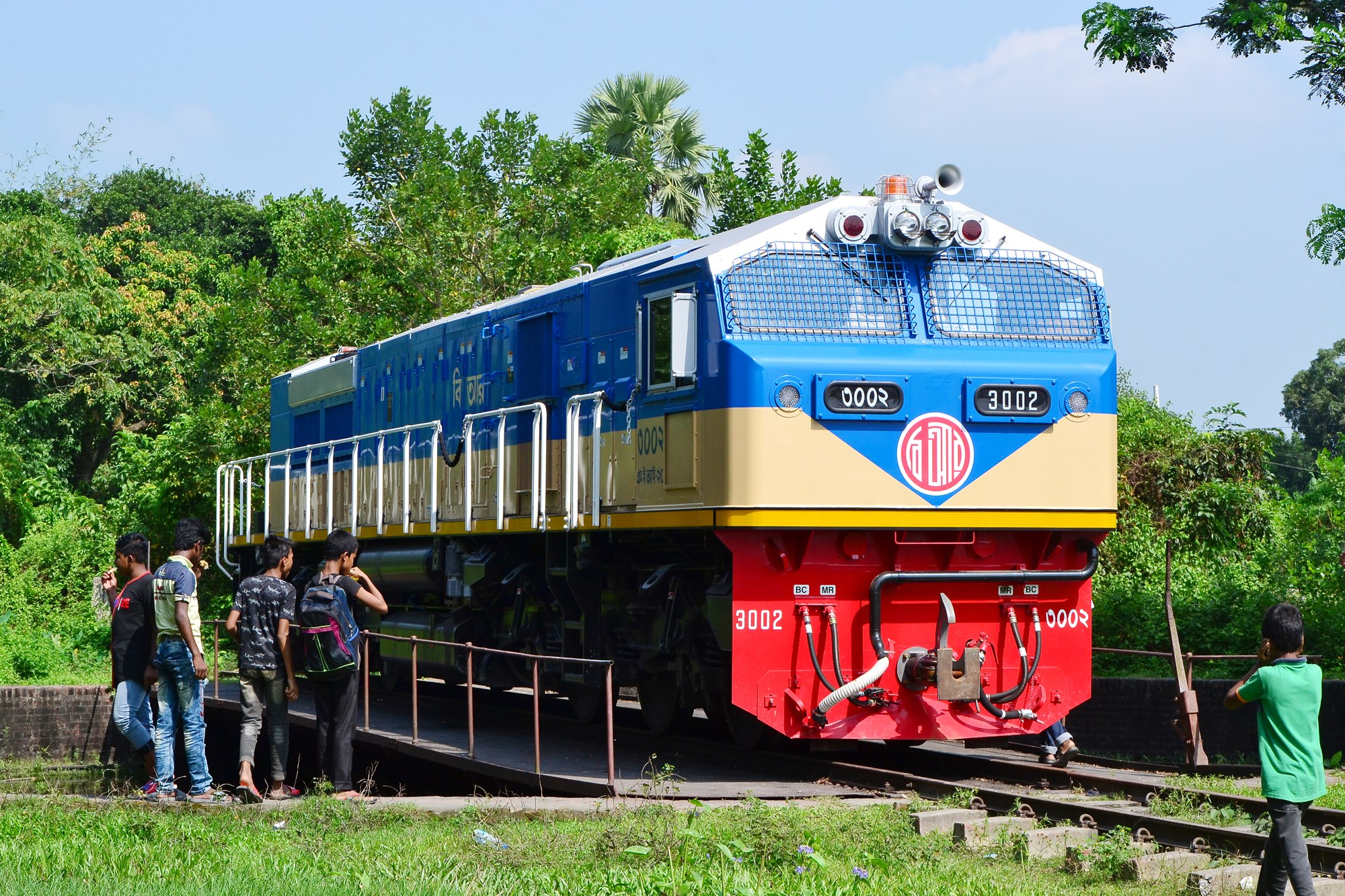
- Locomotive 3002 on a turntable
Type and origin
- Power type: Diesel-electric
- Designer: Electro Motive Diesel
- Builder: Hyundai Rotem & EMD
- Model: EMD GT38ACL
- Build date: 2020
- Total produced: 30
Specifications
- Configuration
  - AAR: Bo1-1Bo
- Gauge: 1,000 mm (3 ft 3 3/8 in) for 3001-3010, 3011-3030 is convertible from 1000 mm to 1,676 mm by switching bogies
- Bogies: HTCF (High Tensile Cast Fabricated) Bogies
- Length: 18.942 m (62.15 ft)
- Height: 3.766 m (12.36 ft)
- Loco weight: 90 tonnes (89 long tons; 99 short tons)
- Fuel type: Diesel
- Fuel capacity: 3,800 litres (840 imp gal; 1,000 US gal)
- Prime mover: EMD 8-710G3A-T2
- Engine type: Two-stroke
- Alternator: TA9-12CA9SE (3001-3010); TA12-CA9 (3011-3030)
- Traction motors: AC
- Cylinders: 8
- Transmission: Diesel-electric
- Couplers: Norwegian
Performance figures
- Maximum speed: 120 km/h (75 mph)
- Power output: 2,200 hp (1,600 kW)
Career
- Operators: Bangladesh Railway
- Class: MEI-20
- Numbers: 3001–3030
- Current owner: Bangladesh Railway
- Disposition: All in service

The Bangladesh Railway Class 3000 is a class of meter-gauge diesel-electric locomotives operated by the Bangladesh Railway.

== History ==
In 2020, 10 manufactured by Hyundai Rotem in South Korea under license to Electro-Motive Diesel were delivered.

== Technical details ==
The newer locos use the EMD 8-710G3A-T2 as prime mover. Their power is 2,200 hp and can achieve speed up to 110 km\h (70 mph) The wheel arrangement is Bo1-1Bo (Each bogie having two powered axles and one unpowered inner axle) having total of six axles but only four traction motors. There are controversy regarding the model of alternator used in the first 10 locomotives of the series, as Hyundai Rotem provided TA9-12CA9SE instead of TA12-CA9, which was to be provided as mentioned in the contract.
