= Tongi–Bhairab–Akhaura line =

Railway line in Bangladesh

Overview
- Status: Operational
- Owner: Bangladesh Railway
- Locale: Bangladesh
- Termini: Tongi Junction railway station; Akhaura Junction railway station
- Stations: 20

Service
- Operator: Bangladesh Railway

History
- Opened: 1910–14
- Closed: Operating

Technical
- Number of tracks: 2
- Track gauge: 1,000 mm (3 ft 3 3/8 in) metre gauge
- Operating speed: Booked at 72 km/h

The Tongi–Bhairab–Akhaura line (Bengali: টঙ্গী-ভৈরব-আখাউড়া রেলপথ) is a railway line connecting Tongi and Akhaura, via Bhairab Bazar in Bangladesh. There is a branch line from Bhairab Bazar to Mymensingh via Gouripur. These tracks are under the jurisdiction of Bangladesh Railway.

== History ==
In response to the demand of the Assam tea planters for a railway link to Chittagong port, Assam Bengal Railway started construction of a railway track on the eastern side of Bengal in 1891. A 150-kilometre-long (93 mi) track between Chittagong and Comilla was opened to traffic in 1895. The Comilla–Akhaura–Kulaura–Badarpur section was opened in 1896–98 and finally extended to Lumding in 1903. In an effort to link this line running on the eastern bank of the Meghna with the rail system on the western bank of the Meghna, the Tongi–Bhairab–Akhaura line came up between 1910 and 1914. However, there was no bridge across the Meghna at that time.

== Bhairab railway bridge ==
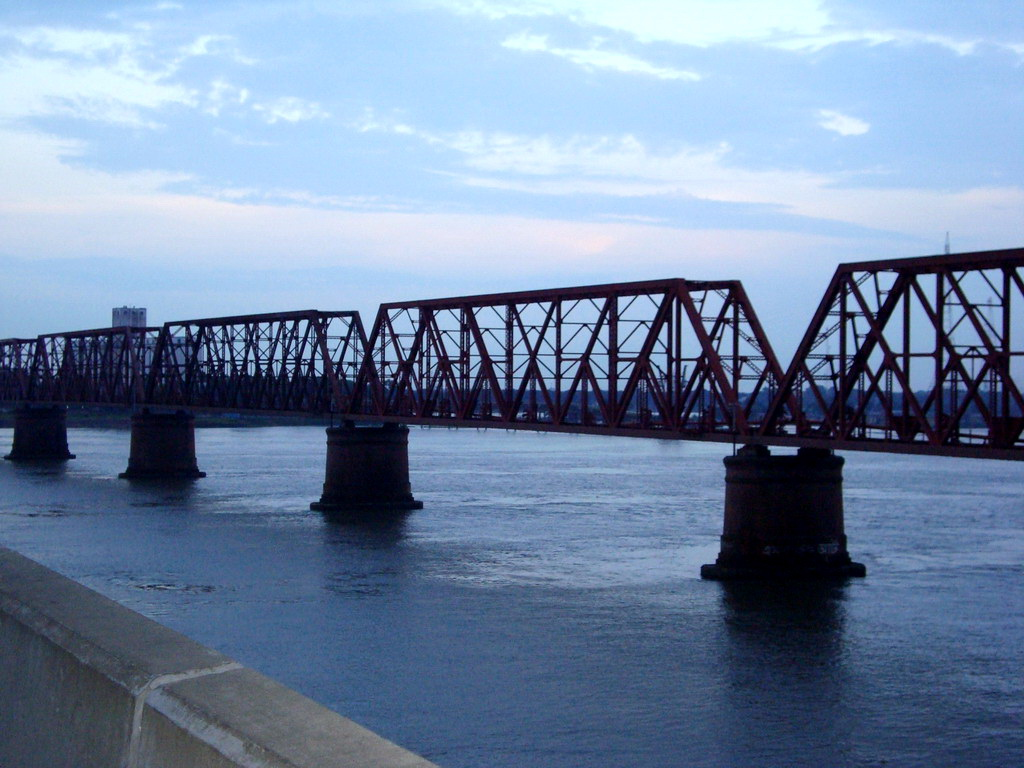
Bhairab Railway Bridge

The bridge over the Meghna River, popularly known as the Bhairab railway bridge, was opened on 6 December 1937, enabling passage between Dhaka and Chittagong.

In November 2011, the Bangladesh Railway signed an agreement with two Indian private companies for the feasibility study, detail design and preparation of tender documents for the construction of the second Bhairab rail bridge across the Meghna and second rail bridge across the Titas River.

The 1.2-kilometre-long (0.75 mi) Bangladesh–UK Friendship Bridge, completed in 2002, carries the Dhaka-Sylhet Highway across the Meghna between Bhairab Bazar and Ashuganj.

== Developments ==
Bangladesh Railway signed a deal with a Chinese firm in July 2011 for doubling the 64-kilometre (40 mi) single-line Tongi–Bhairab Bazar track. It has been completed by Jan. 2016. Doubling of the 71-kilometre (44 mi) Akhaura–Laksam section was initiated in 2007.

== Bhairab Bazar–Gouripur–Mymensingh line ==
While the Narayanganj–Bahadurabad Ghat Line runs along the southern bank of the old channel of the Brahmaputra River, the Bhairab Bazar–Gouripur–Mymensingh line covers the northern bank of the river.

The Mymensingh–Bhairab Bazar Railway Company constructed this line between 1912 and 1918. It was acquired by the government in 1948–49 and the Assam Bengal Railway Company was in charge of the management of the line.

There are two lines branching out of this line – a short Shyamganj-Jaria Janjail Line and a long Gouripur-Netrokona-Mohanganj Line.
