= Akhaura–Laksam–Chittagong line =

Railway line in Bangladesh

Akhaura–Laksam–Chittagong line আখাউড়া-লাকসাম-চট্টগ্রাম লাইন
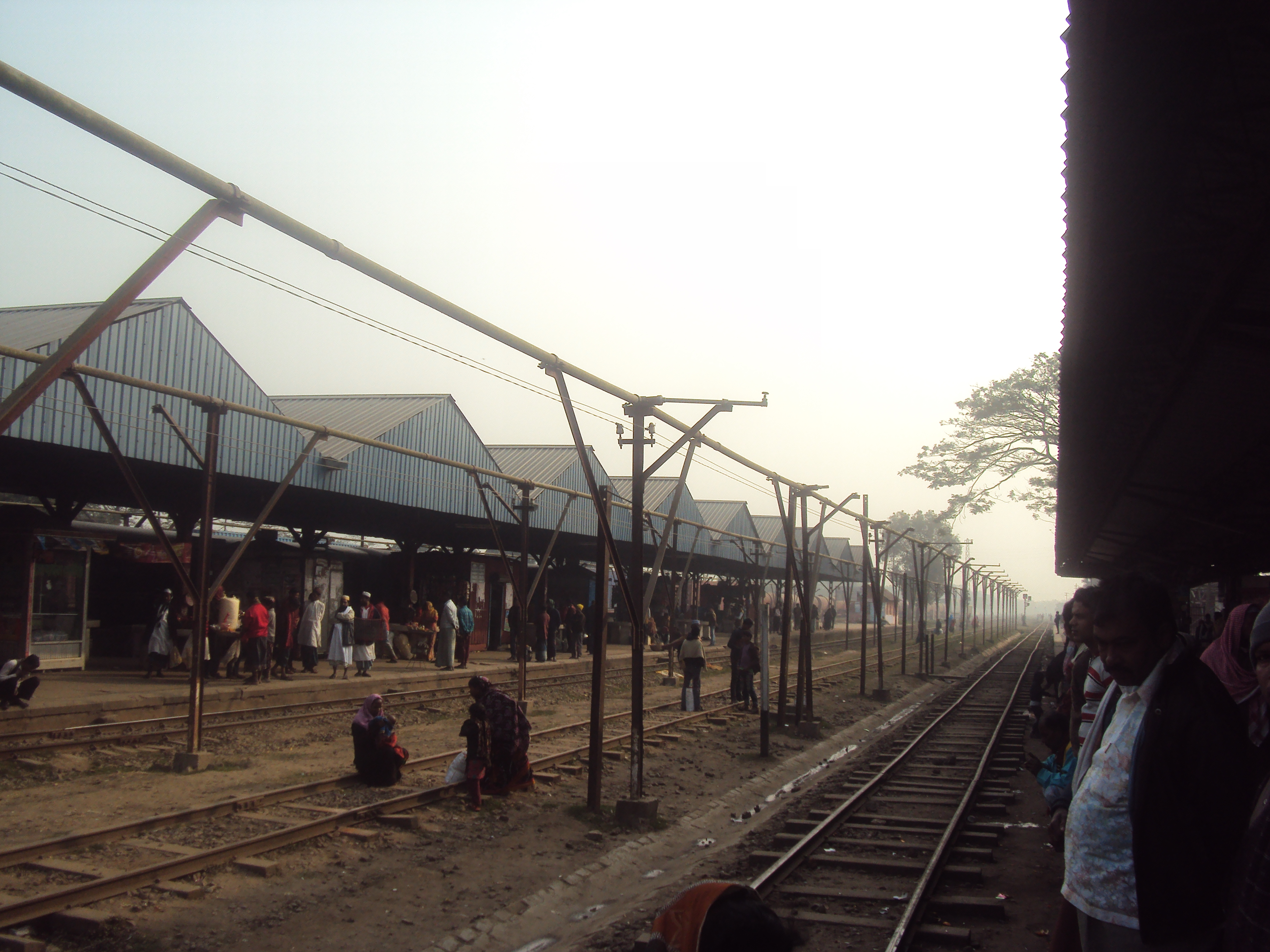
- Laksam station

Overview
- Status: Operational
- Owner: Bangladesh Railway
- Locale: Bangladesh
- Termini: Akhaura; Chittagong
- Stations: 39

History
- Opened: 1895–98

Technical
- Num of tracks: 2/ 1
- Track gauge: 1,000 mm (3 ft 3 3/8 in) metre gauge mixed with 1,676 mm (5 ft 6 in)in Dual Gauge Layout

The Akhaura–Laksam–Chittagong line is a railway line connecting Akhaura and Chittagong, via Laksam in Bangladesh. There are branch lines from Laksam to Chandpur and Noakhali. This line is under the jurisdiction of Bangladesh Railway.

== History ==
In response to the demand of the Assam tea planters for a railway link to Chittagong port, Assam Bengal Railway started construction of a railway track on the eastern side of Bengal in 1891. A 150-kilometre-long (93 mi) track between Chittagong and Comilla was opened to traffic in 1895. The Comilla-Akhaura-Kulaura-Badarpur section was opened in 1896–1898 and finally extended to Lumding in 1903. On 1 January 1906, Bengal Railway Company was merged with Assam Bengal Railway.

== Laksam-Noakhali branch line ==
The Laksam-Noakhali Line is a railway line connecting Laksam, Comilla and Noakhali. This line is also under the jurisdiction of Bangladesh Railway. Laksam - Noakhali section was constructed by Bengal Railway company in 1903.

== Laksam-Chandpur branch line ==
The Laksam–Chandpur line is a railway line connecting Laksam, Comilla and Chandpur. This line is also under the jurisdiction of Bangladesh Railway. Laksam - Chandpur section was constructed by Bengal Railway company in 1906.

== Cox's Bazar and Gundum links ==
Construction of a railway track from Dohazari to Cox's Bazar has been initiated. Thereafter, it is proposed to be extended to Gundum on the Bangladesh–Myanmar border for linking with Myanmar Railways as part of Trans-Asian Railway.

== Agartala link ==
Indian Railways is constructing a 14-kilometre-long (8.7 mi) track from Agartala to Akhaura junction through Gangasagar in Bangladesh opposite to Belabor-Gazaria area in south-west Agartala. Agartala is 1,557 km (967 mi) from Kolkata via Guwahati, whereas the distance between Agartala and Kolkata via Bangladesh is just about 652 km (405 mi).

== Developments ==
Out of the total length of 324 kilometres (201 mi) between Dhaka and Chittagong, only 102 kilometres (63 mi) is double-track and non-contiguous. Efforts are on to make the entire length double-track.

In 2017 an agreement with Chinese contractors was signed to double-track and regauge the railway line to 5 ft 6 in (1,676 mm) broad gauge. 2·5bn of the total cost of 3·1bn taka is to be provided as assistance by Chinese government.

== Trains ==
Fifteen trains leave Chittagong railway station every day for different parts of the country: Paharika, Jalalabad and Udayan Express for Sylhet, Sagarika and Meghna for Chandpur, Karnaphuli, Dhaka Mail and Turna Nishita for Dhaka, Godhuli for Dhaka, Nasirabad for Bahadurabad, Dhaka mail for Dhaka, and Paharika and two shuttle trains for Chittagong University.

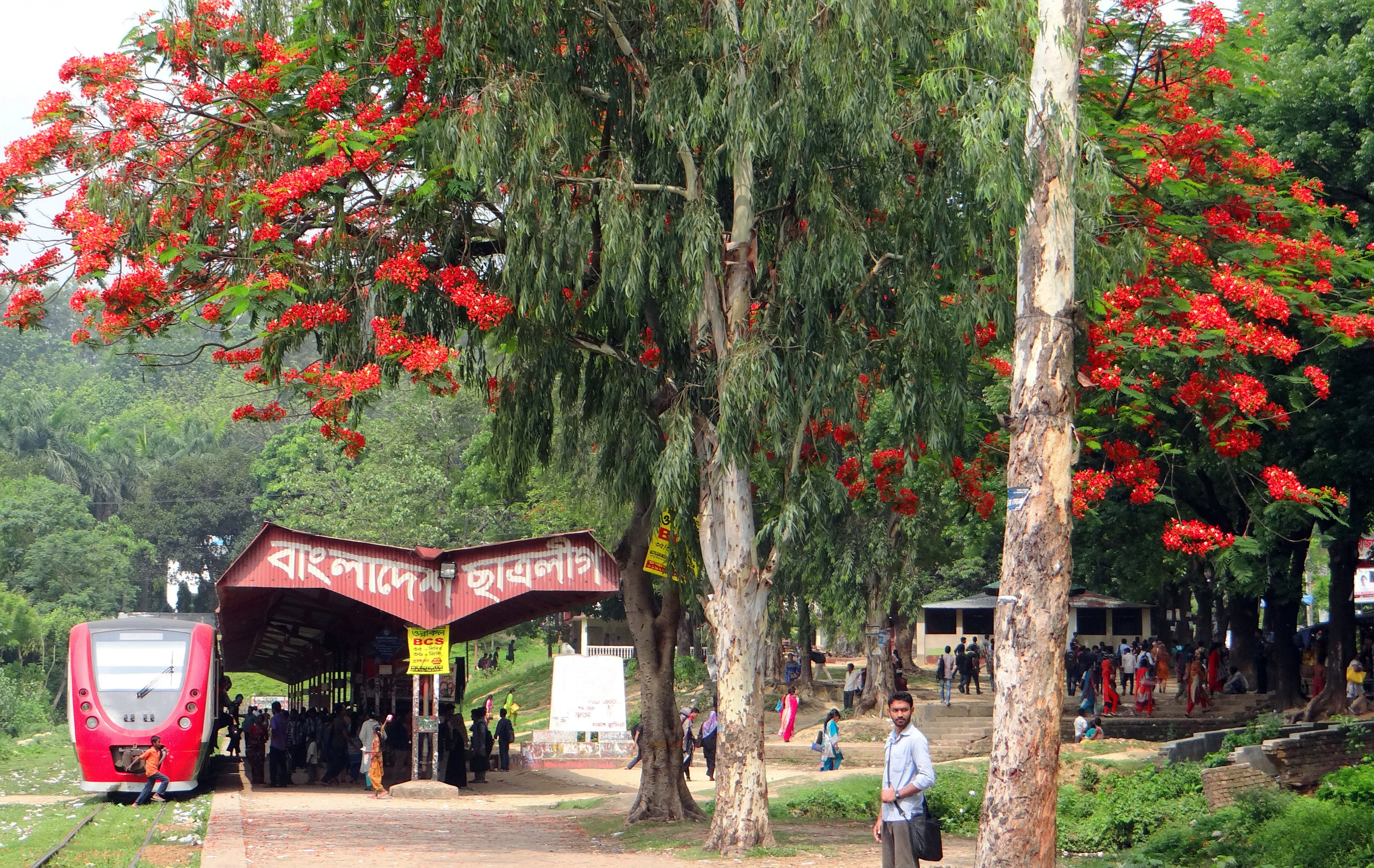
Chittagong University Railway Station

There are some intercity train and Mail/Express train departure from Akhaura to different city. Such as Bijoy Express, Mohanagar Express, Paharika Express, Turna, Udayan Express and Upakul Express.

Chattala Express, Chittagong Mail, Comilla Commuter, Dhaka Express, Jalalabad Express, Karnafuli Express, Mymenshing Express, Surma Mail, Sylhet Commuter, Titas Commuter.
