= East Zone (Bangladesh Railway) =

Railway zone of Bangladesh

Bangladesh Railway East Zone
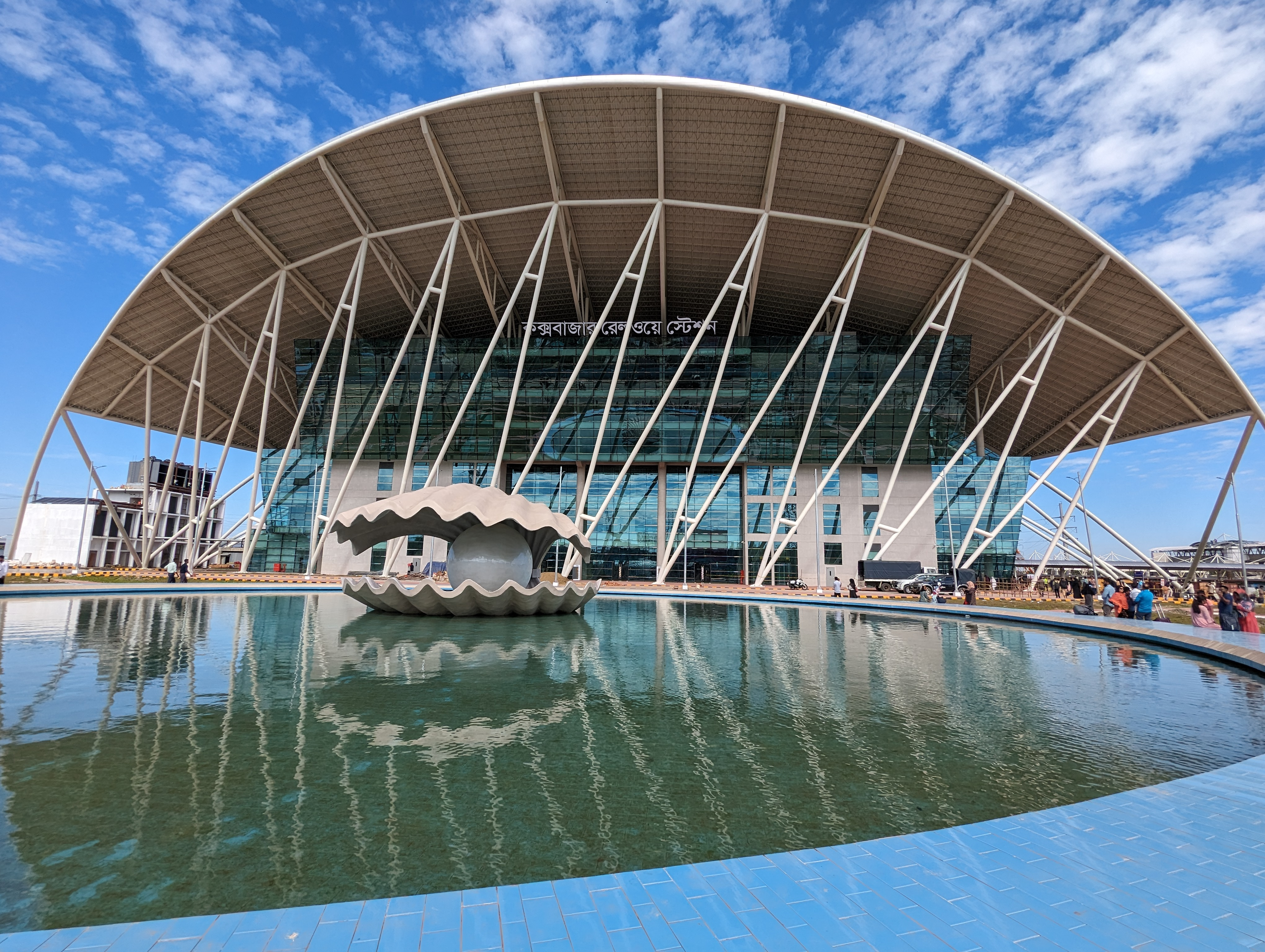
- Cox's Bazar Railway Station

Overview
- Headquarters: CRB Building, Chattogram
- Locale: Chattogram Division, Sylhet Division, Mymensingh Division and Dhaka Division(excluding Tangail District and Greater Faridpur)
- Dates of operation: 3 June 1982; 44 years ago–

Technical
- Track gauge: Metre gauge (MG) and Dual gauge(DG)
- Length: 2,151.79 kilometres (1,337.06 mi)

Other
- Website: www.railway.gov.bd

Bangladesh Railway has two zones, one of which is the East Zone of Bangladesh Railway. This zone covers the Dhaka, Chattogram, Sylhet, and Mymensingh divisions. Also, the parts of Cumilla, Kishoreganj, Noakhali, and Cox's Bazar have recently.

There are three types of rail lines as well as broad gauge, meter gauge, and dual gauge. By the way, the eastern zone uses most of the line is meter gauge.

== Divisions ==
East zone has two operational divisions. They are

- Dhaka railway division
- Chattogram railway division

== See also ==
- West Zone (Bangladesh Railway)
