= List of rail accidents in Bangladesh =

The following is a list of some railway accidents, incidents and disasters in Bangladesh.

== Before 1972 ==
05/08/1940: The Dacca Mail train (Dacca is now Dhaka) derailed near Jairampur, Chuadanga. This wreck killed 34 people.

17/05/1947: On the metre gauge railline of Assam Bengal Railway during British Rule an express train derailed between Kasba/Kamalasagor and Nayanpur. Several coaches rolled to an embankment. 36 people died and 58 were injured.

== 1972 ==
- June 4: An overcrowded passenger train was directed into wrong line where it smashed a stationary freight train in Jessore. 10 coaches were completely destroyed and several other hurled off the rail. 76 people killed and 500 more injured in this accident.

== 1974 ==
March 12: Train accident in Cumilla killed 10 people.

== 1979 ==
- January 26: Parbatipur Bound 23UP Rocket Mail derailed near Gaidghat, 3 km away from Chuadanga. 86 people died and more than 500 people injured in this accident.

== 1983 ==
- March 22: A rail bridge collapsed with a running train in Iswardi, Pabna. Approximately 60 people died.
- December 21: The head-on collision between two trains in Dhala, 100 miles from Dhaka, killing 20 people and injuring 200 more.
- July 9: A passenger train rammed a stationary freight train at Hili railway station, Dinajpur. Two train compartment and the engine derailed. Nobody died but several injured.

== 1985 ==
- January 13: Parbatipur-bound Simanta Express caught fire near Bheramara. Passengers tried to stop the train by pulling the communication cord, but the driver did not stop the train, apparently because robbers operate in the area. Twenty-seven people died and at least 58 were injured due to the fire.

== 1986 ==
- March 15: Due to sabotage a train derailed and plunged into a river near Bheramara, Kushtia, killing 25 people and injuring 45 more.

== 1989 ==
- January 15: At 7:30 a.m. Dhaka Bound Dhaka Mail train collided head-on with Chittagong-bound Inter-city Urmi Express train at Pubail, Gazipur District, due to the railway staff not knowing how to operate the new signal system. 6 carriage derailed and rolled off an embankment into a rice paddy. Due to the Bishwa Ijtema religious festival at Tongi, there were over 2,000 people in total on both trains, with many riding on roofs or between coaches. Official report said 96 people died and 400 were injured, through some report said at least 170 people died.
- 02/02/1989: The derailment of a passenger train near Chittagong District resulted in 13 deaths and 200 injured people.

== 1995 ==
- January 13: Khulna-Bound Simanto Express collided with stationary Goalondo Local Train at Hili Railway Station, Dinajpur. Two carriage and locomotive were entirely destroyed. This wreck killed 50 people and injured 200 people.

== 1996 ==
- January 9: Sagorika Express train collided with a local train near Haziganj, Chandpur, killing 16 people and injuring 100 people.

== 1998 ==
May 10: The collision between a passenger train and a freight train in Naoti Railway Station, Laksam, killing 17 people and injuring 26 people.

== 2002 ==
- October 27: A Chittagong-bound train collided with another passenger train near Akhaura at Azampur railway station after ignoring a signal. Three carriages derailed on impact and at least 8 people died as well as 30 others were injured.

== 2006 ==
- June 11: Khulna-Bound Rupsha Express hits a bus in an unnamed level crossing in Akkelpur, Joypurhat. This accident killed 32 people and injured 30 more people.

== 2008 ==
- June 11: Dhaka-Bound Ekota Express hits a bus in an unnamed level crossing in Kalihati, Tangail. This accident killed 17 people and injured 40 more people.

== 2010 ==
- December 9: At Narsingdi Railway Station Intercity Mahanagar Godhuli and Chattala Express train collided with each other, killing 14 people including train driver of Mahanagar Godhuli and over 100 injured.

== 2013 ==
- April 1: The train Turna Express on 1 April 2013 which started from Kamalapur Railway Station Dhaka and towards Chittagong. It started 25 minutes late from its scheduled time at (11:30pm). When it reached Comilla Station it was about to dawn. 15 minutes after leaving Comilla Station. The train derailed at Shibrampur because of a sabotage. Six carriage derailed. Nobody died but 30 passengers injured.

== 2014 ==
- April 13: At around 3:20 a.m., a running Dhaka-bound Ekota Express collided head-on with a standing Lalmonirhat-bound Lalmoni Express at Ullapara railway station, Sirajganj District. Three coaches of Ekota Express and one coach of Lalmoni Express were mangled. A total of seven coaches veered off the tracks. At least two people died and 50 more were injured.
- July 9: At 6:30 a.m., a freight train carrying furnace oil to a power plant from Patenga the train derailed near Faujdarhat Junction railway station in Chittagong, and leaked around 21,255 imp gal (96,630 L; 25,526 US gal) of crude. Six wagons of the train derailed and oil from three of the wagons flowed into a nearby canal. Udayan Express from Sylhet narrowly escaped a fatal accident on the route with that train.

== 2016 ==
- January 10: A locomotive of a Brahmanbaria-bound commuter train derailed at Arshinagar, Narsingdi District. Two died and 10 were injured.
- September 14: At around 11:00 a.m., a container freight train with locomotive 2037 derailed in Faujdarhat, Chittagong. The train driver and the assistant driver were injured.
- October 7: Locomotive no. 2933, which was one of the newest locomotives of class 2900, caught fire and derailed with several coaches of Parabat Express near Noapara railway station in Noyapara Upazila, Habiganj District. The driver cab and electrical cabinet of the locomotive were destroyed in the fire, and the locomotive had to undergo heavy repairs.

== 2018 ==
- March 9: Five minutes before reaching Chandpur railway station, power car no. 8358 of Meghna Express caught fire due to overheating of the generator. The railway staffs were able to extinguish fire completely before the situation could go worse. There were no deaths but almost 30 passengers were injured as they sought to escape the train.
- March 15: The connecting portion of Ga and Gha coaches of Chittagong-bound Subarna Express caught fire at about 3:30 p.m. in Mohakhali Amtali area near Banani railway station, Dhaka. But the reason for catching fire is not known. Later, railway workers, passengers and firefighters extinguished the fire. No casualties occurred.
- April 15: Five coaches of a train derailed at Tongi, Gazipur District. Five died and 50 injured as a result.

== 2019 ==
- June 23: Kulaura Train accident At around 11:40 p.m., several coaches of Dhaka-bound Upaban Express veered off the tracks after a culvert over the Barochhara Canal broke down, two-hundred yards off Baramchal railway station in Kulaura Upazila, Moulvibazar District. Two coaches fell into the canal and one overturned. At least five people died and hundreds were injured.
- July 15: At least 10 people on a microbus were killed in a collision with a Dhaka-bound train at an unmanned level crossing in Ullahpara Upazila, Sirajganj District.
- November 12: Mondobhag Train collision At around 3 a.m., Dhaka-bound Turna Express rammed the Chittagong-bound Udayan Express at Mondobhag railway station in Kasba Upazila, Brahmanbaria District. At least 18 people died and 73 were injured. Three coaches of Udayan Express were damaged.
- November 14: At around 2 p.m., a locomotive and seven coaches (including a power car) of Rangpur-bound Rangpur Express derailed at Ullapara railway station area in Sirajganj District. Fire broke out in three coaches. Nobody was killed but at least 25 passengers were injured when they hurried to get off the coaches due to the fire.

== 2020 ==
- November 7: At around 4:30 a.m., A Dhaka-bound Nilsagar Express collided with a bus stuck on a level crossing in Gazipur District. The bus got stuck with the locomotive of the train and was dragged around one or half of kilometer. Two died and at least five were injured.
- December 6: At around 11 a.m. or 12 p.m. near Shahjibazar railway station of Habiganj District, five wagons of a Sylhet-bound oil-carrying train from Chittagong derailed and the train fell off from the track and caught fire.
- December 19: At 6:55 a.m. the Uttara Express collided with a passenger bus in Puranapoil railgate in Joypurhat, killing 12 people and injuring 3 more people.

== 2022 ==
- July 27: Eleven people died in a collision between a microbus and Chittagong-Bound Intercity Mahanagar Probhati Express train in Borotakiya, Mirsorai, Chattogram.

== 2023 ==
- October 23: 2023 Dhaka Train Collision At least 18 people were killed when a passenger train and a freight train collided outside Bangladesh's capital, Dhaka, during a busy holiday season. The accident, in the Kishoreganj district, 45 miles east of the capital. Over 100 others were wounded. Sadiqur Rahman Sabuj, the chief administrative officer of Bhairab, where the crash occurred, said the passenger train was trying to switch tracks en route to Dhaka when a freight train headed in the opposite direction struck its last two coaches, which were packed with 300 passengers. “As Bangladesh is celebrating Durga Puja, many are moving from city to city,” Mr. Sadiqur said, referring to a Hindu festival. “The death toll may rise further.”
- December 13: Dhaka-Bound Intercity Mohonganj Express derailed in Bankharia (Chilai River) rail bridge in Gazipur, killing 1 and injured 10 people.

== 2026 ==
- March 22: At least 12 people died and 18 people injured when Dhaka mail train struck a bus in Paduar Bazar Railgate in Cumilla.

== Sources ==
- Semmens, Peter (1994). Railway Disasters of the World: Principal Passenger Train Accidents of the 20th Century. Patrick Stephens Ltd. ISBN 1-85260-323-2.
