= Upaban Express =

Intercity train from Dhaka to Sylhet under Bangladesh Railway

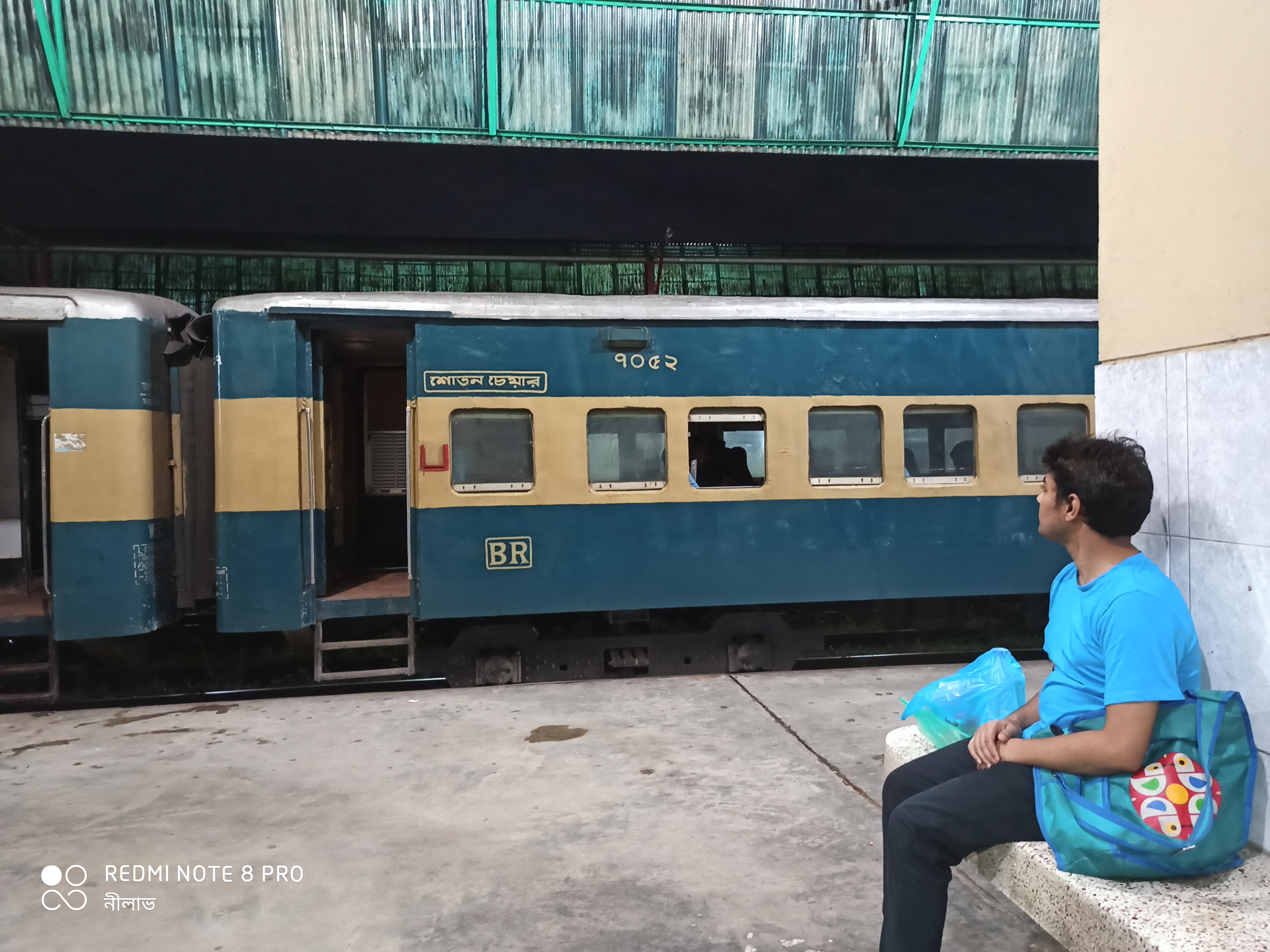
- Passengers waiting for Dhaka-bound intercity train Upaban Express at Sylhet railway station

Overview
- Service type: Intercity Rail in Bangladesh
- Status: Operating
- Locale: Bangladesh
- First service: 4 May 1988; 38 years ago, 28 years ago
- Current operator: Bangladesh Railway
- Website: https://railway.gov.bd

Route
- Termini: Kamalapur Railway Station; Sylhet Railway Station
- Stops: 11 stations
- Distance travelled: 319 kilometres (198 miles)
- Average journey time: 7 hours
- Service frequency: 6 days a week
- Train number: 739/740

On-board services
- Classes: AC Sleeper, AC Chair, Shovan Chair
- Seating arrangements: Yes
- Sleeping arrangements: Yes
- Catering facilities: Yes
- Entertainment facilities: Yes
- Baggage facilities: Overhead racks and a dedicated Baggage car
- Other facilities: Wi-Fi and Charging Socket

Technical
- Rolling stock: A Class 3000/Class 2900 locomotive * One Baggage carriage * Two Pantry along with Non AC Chair carriages * Two AC Chair carriages * One AC Sleeper carriage * One generator carriage * Seven fully Non-AC Chair carriages
- Track gauge: 1,000 mm (3 ft 3 3/8 in)
- Electrification: No
- Operating speed: 70KM/H or 43MPH
- Average length: 14/28
- Track owner: Bangladesh Railway
- Rake sharing: Jayantika Express

Upaban Express (Bengali: উপবন এক্সপ্রেস) is an intercity train running from Dhaka to Sylhet under Bangladesh Railway. Upaban Express was inaugurated on 4 May 1988. Three other intercity trains, Parabat Express, Jayantika Express and Kalni Express run on this route.

== Schedule ==
(Bangladesh Railway's schedule is variable. The following schedule is in accordance with the 52nd schedule of Bangladesh Railway, which is effective from 10 January 2020.)

== Stopover ==
(In some cases, the journey of a train may be changed by Bangladesh Railway. The following list is valid till 2025.)

- Dhaka Airport Railway Station
- Narsingdi
- Bhairab Bazar Junction
- Azampur Railway Station
- Shaistaganj
- Srimangal
- Bhanugach
- Shamsernagar
- Kulaura Junction
- Baramchal
- Maizgaon

== Accident ==
On 24 June 2019, on its way to Dhaka from Sylhet, Upaban Express had an accident at Baramchal, Moulvibazar, in which at least 4 people were killed and many got injured. In this incident, the railway communication between Sylhet and Dhaka was cut off for about 24 hours.
