= Bangladesh Railway Class 2600 =

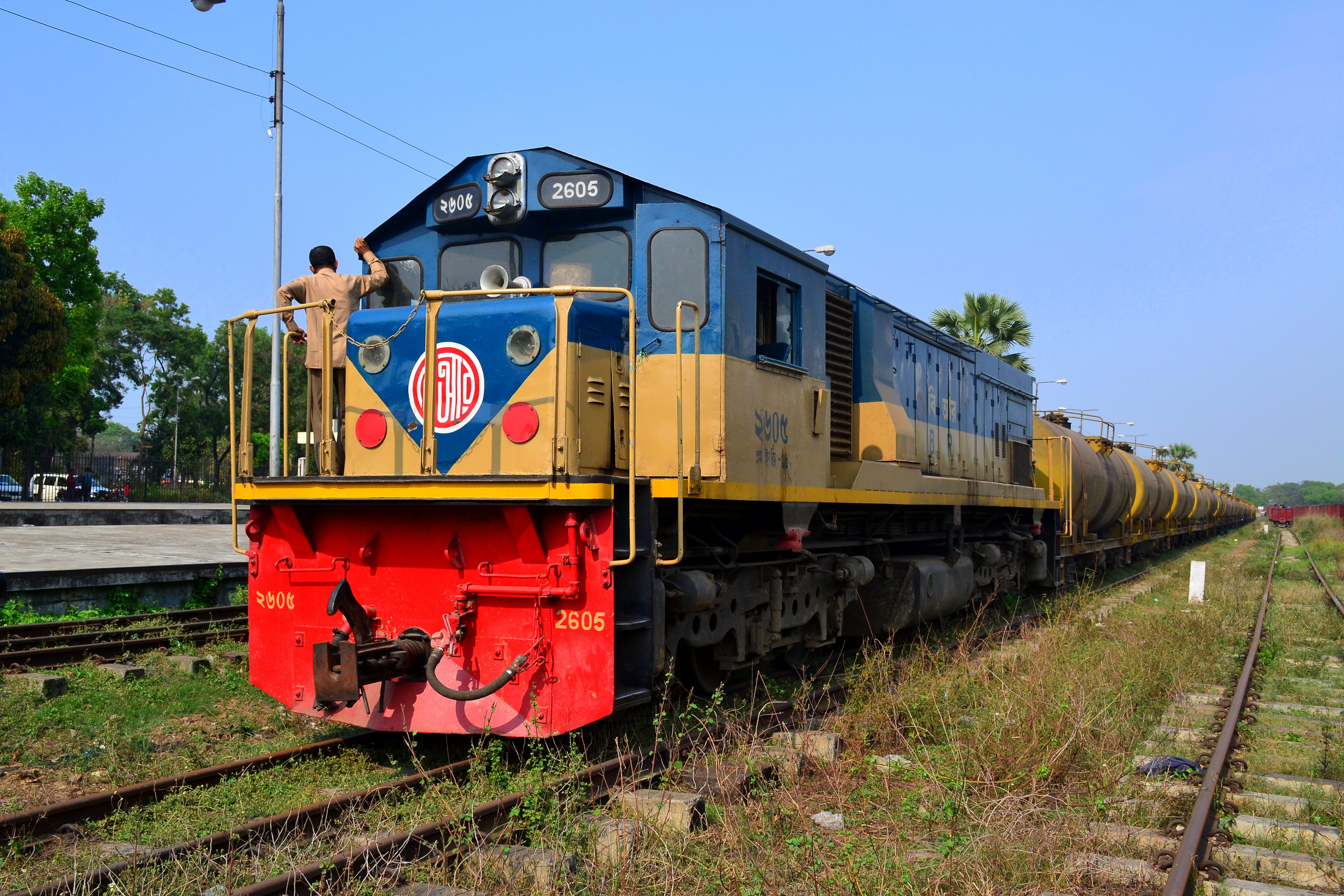
- 2605 with oil tanker at Dhaka Cantonment rail Station
Type and origin
- Power type: Diesel-electric
- Designer: Electro Motive Division
- Builder: General Motors Diesel
- Order number: C466
- Serial number: A4729–A4744
- Model: GT18LA-2
- Build date: 1988
- Total produced: 16
Specifications
- Configuration
  - UIC: (A1A)(A1A)
- Wheelbase: A1A-A1A
- Loco weight: 72 ton (71 long ton, 79 short ton)
Performance figures
- Maximum speed: 107 km/h (66 mph)
- Power output: 1500 hp
Career
- Operators: Bangladesh Railway
- Numbers: 2601–2616

Bangladesh Railway Class 2600 is one of the most frequently used meter-gauge diesel electric locomotive classes of Bangladesh Railway. It is considered one of the strongest and most reliable locomotive classes among the fleet of Bangladesh Railway. These locomotives have been in service since 1988. Currently, Bangladesh Railway has a total of 16 locomotives of this class. These 16 locomotives are being used in both passenger services and freight services. All of them are in good condition.

== Builders details ==
The Class 2600 locomotives are built by General Motors Diesel at its London, Ontario plant, Canada. These 16 locomotives came to Bangladesh in 3 phases.

== Technical details ==
Class 2600 is a 1500 hp locomotive using the EMD 645 diesel engine. The Electro Motive Division export model of this locomotive is GT18L-2. The wheel arrangement of this locomotive is A1A-A1A. This locomotive can speed up to 107 km/h (66mph) with passenger trains. Class 2600 locomotives have a similar specification to Bangladesh Railway Class 2900 locomotives.

The Bangladesh Railway specification of this locomotive is 'M.E.G -15'. Here - M stands for meter-gauge, E Stands for diesel electric, G stands for General Motors and 15 stands for locomotive horsepower (x100).

== Colour ==
1. Sky blue-Yellow
2. Green-Yellow
3. Deep blue-Yellow

== Horn ==
2605,2609 and 2610 locomotive has Harmonium Horn.

== Active Locomotives ==
All are running.

== Usage ==
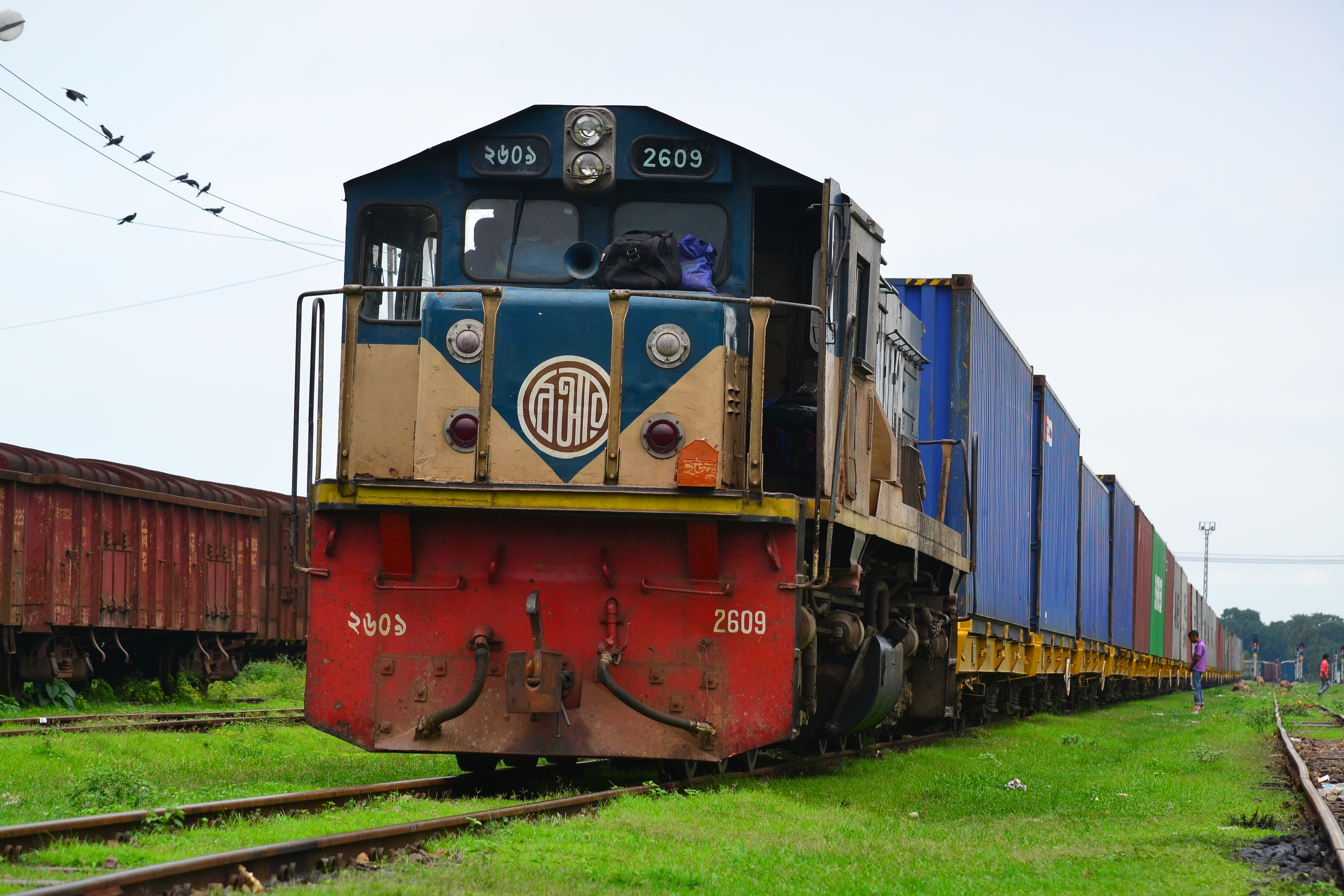
BR 2609 with container train at Akhaura Junction

The Class 2600 locomotive can be used both for passenger services and freight services. In the early days, the Class 2600 locomotive was highly recommended for prominent Bangladeshi trains like Subarna Express, Mohanagar Express, Parabat Express etc. Currently, Class 2600 locomotives are mostly used for freight trains.

The Class 2600 locomotive is considered as efficient for freight services as any other meter-gauge locomotive of Bangladesh Railway. It pulls containers, oil tankers and other departmental freight trains regularly across the country.

== Maintenance ==
Class 2600 locomotives are maintained in the following workshops:

- Central Locomotive Workshop (CLW) at Parbatipur, Dinajpur.
- Diesel Workshop at Pahartali, Chittagong.

== See also ==
- Transport in Bangladesh
- Parabat Express
- Kalni Express
- Lalmoni Express
- Bangladesh Railway Class 2000
- Bangladesh Railway Class 2900
