= EMD GT18LC-2 =

Diesel electric locomotive

GM-EMD GT18LC-2
Type and origin
- Power type: Diesel-electric
- Builder: EMD
- Model: GM GT18LC-2
- Build date: 1970-2001
- Total produced: 87
Specifications
- Configuration
  - AAR: C-C
  - UIC: Co-Co
- Gauge: 1,000 mm (3 ft 3 3/8 in)
- Prime mover: EMD 8-645E3C
- Engine type: 2-stroke diesel
- Aspiration: Turbocharger
- Cylinders: V8
- Transmission: DC traction motor
- Loco brake: Straight air
- Train brakes: Straight air
Performance figures
- Maximum speed: 107 km/h (66 mph)
- Power output: 1,500 hp (1.12 MW)
- Tractive effort: 438 kN (98,000 lbf)
Career
- Numbers: Class 25/1:25101-25112; Class 25/2:25201-25205
- Locale: Keretapi Tanah Melayu
- Delivered: Class 25/1:1991; Class 25/2:2002

The GM-EMD GT18LC-2 diesel electric locomotive was introduced by Electro-Motive Diesel as an export model switcher in the 1970s. The prototype model spent its life at the General Motors plant in London, Ontario, and inspired sales to Egypt (which then canceled their order) and later Malaysia's Keretapi Tanah Melayu (KTM) in 1980 where it was designated KTM Class 25. KTM had been facing a shortage of shunters at that time. The prototype was eventually sold with another eleven more units to KTM in 1990 and after seeing the locomotives' reliability, placed a second order of five locomotives which arrived in 2002. Bangladesh Railway is the largest user of the class with 55 locomotives built by General Motors Diesel and Hyundai Rotem as Class 2600 and Class 2900, respectively.

During KTM's second order of the GT18LC-2, Ghana Railway also placed an order for 14 locomotives of the same model which arrived in 1996.

== Original Owners ==
Railroad	Quantity	Works No.	Local Designation	Numbers	Notes
General Motors	1			GT18LC-2	Sold
Bangladesh Railway	16		Class 2600	2601-2616	All in active service.
Bangladesh Railway	39		Class 2900	2901-2939	All in active service.
Keretapi Tanah Melayu	12		Class 25/1	25101-25112	Delivered 1990, All in active service.
Keretapi Tanah Melayu	5		Class 25/2	25201-25205	Delivered 2002, All in active service.
Ghana Railway	14	928803	Class 16xx	1670-1683	Delivered 1996, All in active service.
Société Nationale des Transports Ferroviaires	6		060-YDD class	060-YDD01- 060-YDD06	Built 1989, model GT18LC-2M. Built with 1055 mm (Algerian gauge) trucks. 3 left in service as of 2023.
