= Mondobhag train collision =

2019 railway incident in Bangladesh

Details
- Date: 12 November 2019; 03:00 local time (09:00 UTC)
- Location: Mondobhag railway station, Kasba
- Coordinates: 23.6879°N 91.1527°E
- Country: Bangladesh
- Line: Akhaura-Laksam-Chittagong line
- Operator: Bangladesh Railway
- Owner: Bangladesh Railway
- Incident type: Collision
- Cause: SPAD

Statistics
- Trains: 2 (Turna Express and Udayan Express)
- Vehicles: Bangladesh Railway Class 2900
- Deaths: 18
- Injured: 73
- Damage: Three carriages destroyed

The Mondobhag train collision occurred on 12 November 2019 at Mondobhag railway station, Kasba, Bangladesh. Two trains were involved. At least 18 people were killed and 73 were injured.

== Collision ==
At 03:00 local time (09:00 UTC) a collision occurred between two trains at Kasba, Bangladesh. The Turna Express passenger train bound for Dhaka and hauled by Class 2900 locomotive 2923 collided with the Udayan Express passenger train bound for Chittagong. Three carriages of the Udayan Express were destroyed. Most of the casualties were in those vehicles. Initially 16 people were killed. Later 2 more people died at hospital, bringing the death toll at 18. 73 were injured, 40 of them people were taken to hospital. It was reported that the Turna Express should have been held outside the station to let the Udayan Express pass. It was reported that the driver of the Turna Express passed a signal at danger. He was one of three people suspended after the crash.

== Investigation ==
An investigation was opened into the accident. The committee found that the Loco master of Turna Express was responsible for the collision.
