= Class 2700 =

Class 2700 or 2700 class may refer to:

- Bangladesh Railway Class 2700
- IE 2700 and 2750 Classes operated by Iarnród Éireann
