= Bangladesh Railway Class 2700 =

Class of diesel-electric locomotives

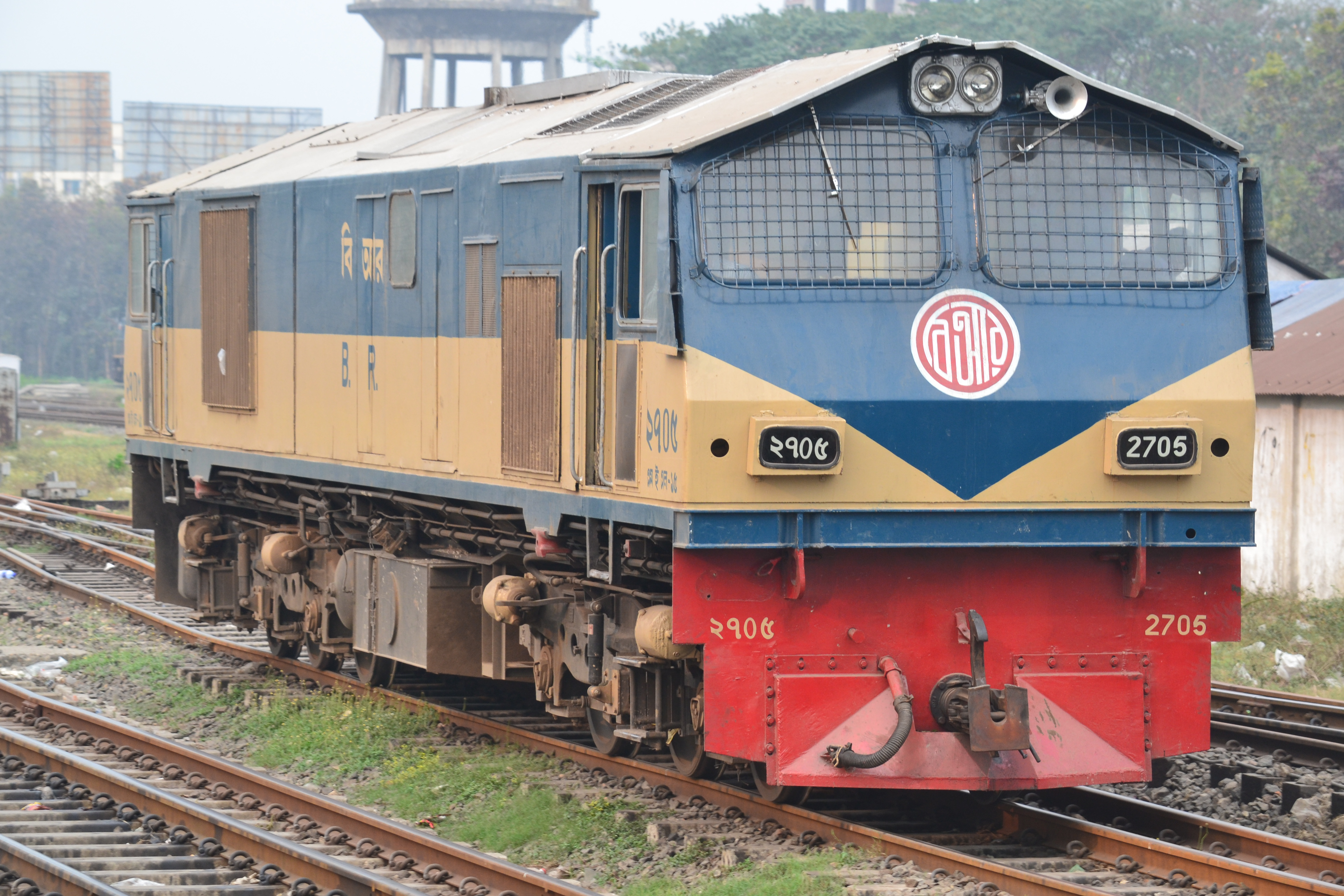
- 2705 at Kamalapur railway station
Type and origin
- Power type: Diesel-electric
- Designer: Electro Motive Division
- Builder: ABB Henschel, Adtranz
- Serial number: 2701-2721
- Model: JT18U6
- Build date: 1994-1996
- Total produced: 21
Specifications
- Gauge: Meter
- Wheelbase: A1A-A1A
- Loco weight: 72 ton
- Prime mover: EMD 8-645E3C
Performance figures
- Maximum speed: 107 km/h (66 mph)
- Power output: 1500 hp
Career
- Current owner: Bangladesh Railway

The Bangladesh Railway Class 2700 diesel electric locomotive is currently (as of 2023) in service on the meter gauge of Bangladesh Railway. This dual cab locomotive series has been in service since 1994. Bangladesh Railway has a total of 21 locomotives that are used in passenger services.

== Builder's details ==
The Class 2700 locomotives are built by ABB Henschel and Adtranz of Germany under the license of Electro Motive Division. These 21 locomotives came to Bangladesh in 2 phases. They are-

- Year 1994 = 2701–2709
- Year 1996 = 2710–2721

== Technical details ==
The Class 2700 is a 1500 hp locomotive. The Electro Motive Division export model of this locomotive is GT18L-2. The wheel arrangement of this locomotive is A1A-A1A. This locomotive can achieve speeds up to 107 kilometres per hour (66 mph) with passenger trains. The Class 2700 locomotives have a similar specification to the Bangladesh Railway 2600 and 2900 class locomotives.

The Bangladesh Railway classification of this locomotive is 'M.E.L -15'. Here, M stands for meter gauge, E stands for diesel electric, L stands for Henschel, and 15 stands for locomotive horsepower (x100).

== Use ==
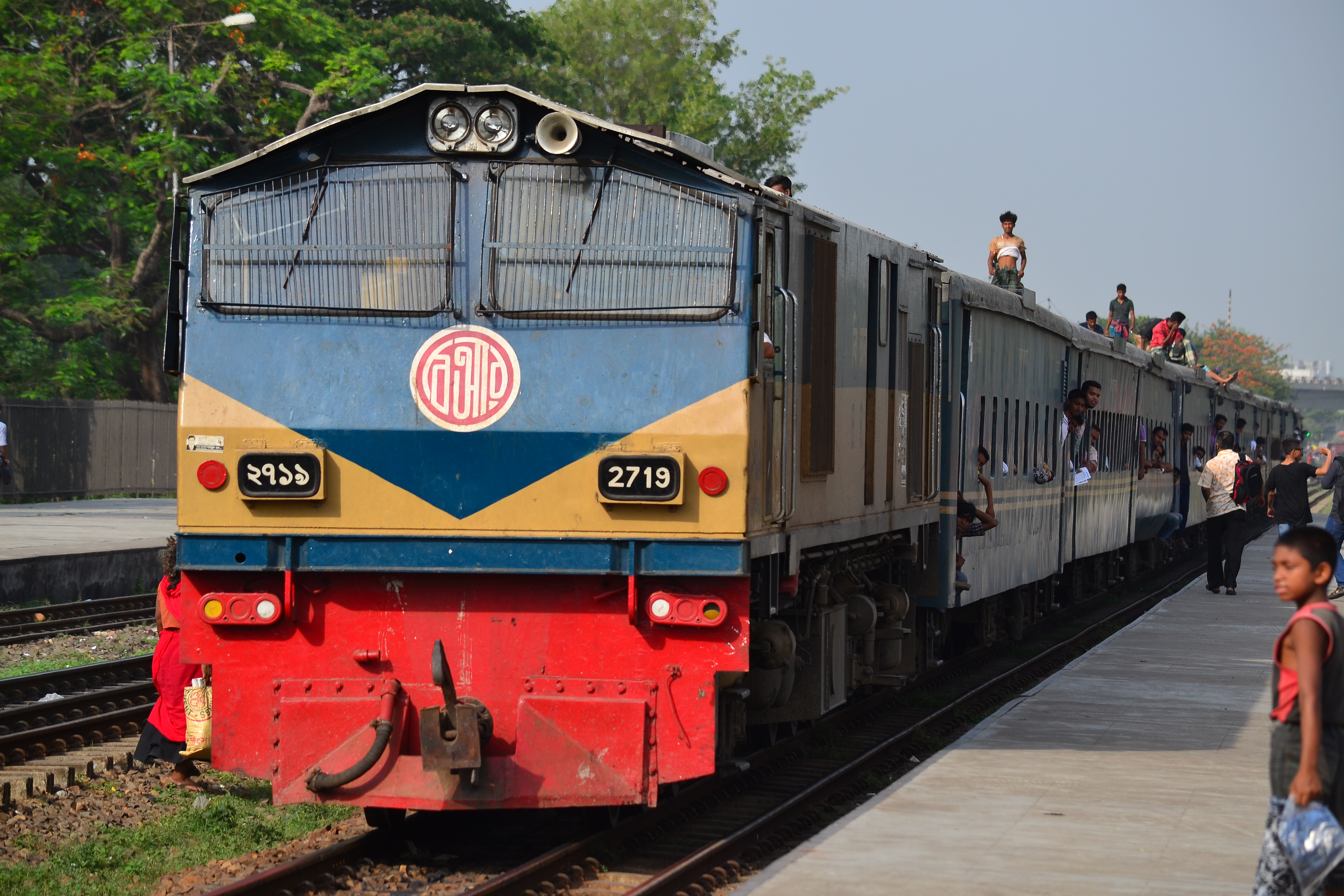
2719 with commuter train

The Class 2700 locomotive can be used both for passenger services and freight services. It was highly recommended for prominent Bangladeshi trains like Kornofuli Komiuter, Nacirabat komuiter, Jamalpur Express, etc. However, Class 2900 and Class 3000 are preferred by Bangladesh Railway for pulling prominent meter-gauge trains nowadays. Class 2700 pulls commuters and short-distance intercity trains.

Initially, Class 2700 locomotives were used for freight services as well. Due to several mechanical constraints, they were taken off from the freight service.

== Maintenance ==
Class 2700 locomotives are maintained in the following workshops:

- Central Locomotive Workshop (CLW) at Parbatipur, Dinajpur.
- Diesel Workshop at Pahartali, Chittagong.
