= Udayan Express =

Intercity train running from Chittagong to Sylhet in Bangladesh

Overview
- Service type: Inter-city rail
- Status: Operating
- First service: 16 May 1988
- Current operator: East Zone (Bangladesh Railway)
- Daily ridership: 8 hours 30 minutes

Route
- Termini: Chittagong Railway Station; Sylhet Railway Station
- Stops: 10 stations
- Train number: 723-724

On-board services
- Classes: AC Cabin, Non AC Cabin, Snigdha, Shovon Chair
- Seating arrangements: Yes
- Sleeping arrangements: Yes
- Catering facilities: Yes
- Observation facilities: Yes
- Entertainment facilities: Yes
- Baggage facilities: Yes

Technical
- Track gauge: Meter gauge
- Operating speed: 80 Kilometers
- Rake sharing: Paharika Express

Udayan Express (Train No. 723/724) is an intercity train running from Chittagong to Sylhet under Bangladesh Railway. This train is currently operated by MG PT Inca coaches from Indonesia. It is the 2nd intercity train on the Chittagong-Sylhet route, Udayan Express. Udayan Express was inaugurated on 16 May 1988. Apart from Udayan Express, Paharika Express also runs on the Chittagong-Sylhet route.

== Schedule ==
(Bangladesh Railway timetable is subject to change. You are requested to check the latest timetable by visiting the official website of Bangladesh Railway. The following timetable is as per the 54th timetable of Bangladesh Railway, which is effective from March 10, 2024.)

== Stoppages ==
(In some cases, the journey of a train may be changed by Bangladesh Railway. The following list is valid till 2025.)

- Chattogram
- Feni
- Laksam
- Cumilla
- Akhaura
- Shaistaganj
- Sreemangal
- Shamshernagar
- Kulaura
- Maijgaon
- Sylhet
