= Railway Nirapatta Bahini =

Security force for Bangladesh Railway

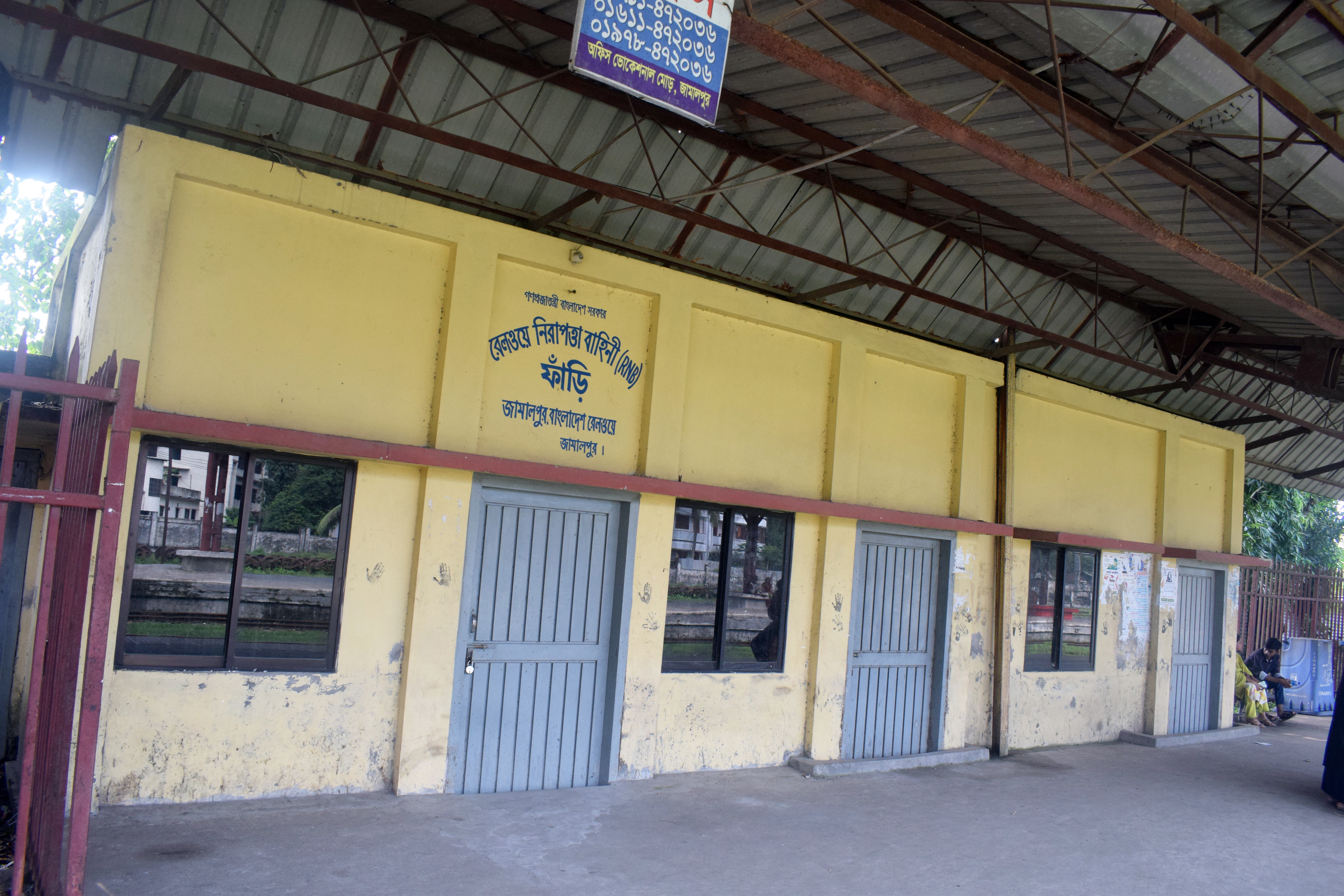
- Railway Nirapatta Bahini office at Jamalpur Town Junction Railway Station
- Abbreviation: RNB
- Formation: 1976; 50 years ago
- Type: Law enforcement
- Purpose: (1) Protection of Railway Property: Safeguarding stations, rail tracks, locomotives, and other railway infrastructure from theft, vandalism, and damage. (2) Preventing illegal encroachment and unauthorized access to railway premises.
- Headquarters: CRB Chattogram Bangladesh
- Region served: Bangladesh
- Members: 2000
- Official language: Bengali
- Chief Command East Zone: Md Ashabul Islam
- Main organ: Ministry of Railways
- Parent organization: Bangladesh Railway
- Uniform: Olive Green shart & Yankees Blue trouser

Railway Nirapatta Bahini (Bengali: রেলওয়ে নিরাপত্তা বাহিনী, lit. 'Railway Security Force') is a specialized security force under the state owned Bangladesh Railway responsible for providing security to railways and trains. It is under the Ministry of Railways. Md Ashabul Islam is the Chief Commandant East zone of Railway Nirapatta Bahini.

== History ==
Railway Nirapatta Bahini was established in 1976 through the Railway Nirapatta Bahini Ordinance. The Railway Nirapatta Bahini Ordinance of 1976 was repealed and replaced with an updated ordinance in 2016. In 2006, personnel of the Bahini were accused of extorting passengers in the Eastern Zone.

As of 2013, Railway Nirapatta Bahini had about two thousand personnel. It worked with Railway Police to ensure the safety and security of the rail system in Bangladesh. In 2019, the 11th batch of the Railway Nirapatta Bahini graduated and completed their passing parade at Paksey, Pabna District.

== Ranks ==
=== Senior officers ===
1. Chief Commandant
2. Commandant
3. Assistant Commandant

=== Junior officers ===
1. Chief Inspector
2. Inspector
3. Sub Inspector
4. Assistant Sub Inspector

=== Junior ranks ===
1. Havildar
2. Nayek
3. Sipahi
