= Kulaura train accident =

2019 railway incident in Bangladesh

Details
- Date: 23 June 2019; 11:30pm (Bangladesh Standard Time)
- Location: Barachhara canal, Baramchal, Kulaura Upazila, Moulvibazar District
- Coordinates: 24.5854°N 91.9784°E
- Country: Bangladesh
- Line: Sylhet-Dhaka

Statistics
- Trains: Upaban Express
- Deaths: 4-5
- Injured: 100+
- Damage: 1km of rail line damaged.

On the night of 23 June 2019, at around 11 PM, an Upaban Express train from Sylhet was on its way to Dhaka. Whilst passing through a culvert, a calamity took place leading to 5 deaths and hundreds of injuries. 1 km of rail line was damaged.

== Description ==
On the day of the accident, the Upaban Express train boarded too many passengers. The construction work of a bridge over the Titas River on the Dhaka-Sylhet highway increased the number of passengers wanting to travel by rail.

Whilst passing Kulaura rail station, the train driver suddenly increased the speed. At around 11:30 PM, before passing above the Barachhara canal in Baramchal, 10 carriages detached from the 7 carriages in front. One of the detached carriages fell into the canal. Two of the remaining detached carriages overturned and fell on the adjacent land and the other seven carriages derailed and fell on the side of the railway line.

After the accident, the local people and police came to the rescue. They were then joined by the Border Guards Bangladesh. The Ministry of Railways formed two separate inquiry committees on 24 June to find out the cause of the Kulaura train accident.
