= Bangladesh Railway Museum =

Railway Museum in Chattogram

- বাংলাদেশ রেলওয়ে জাদুঘর
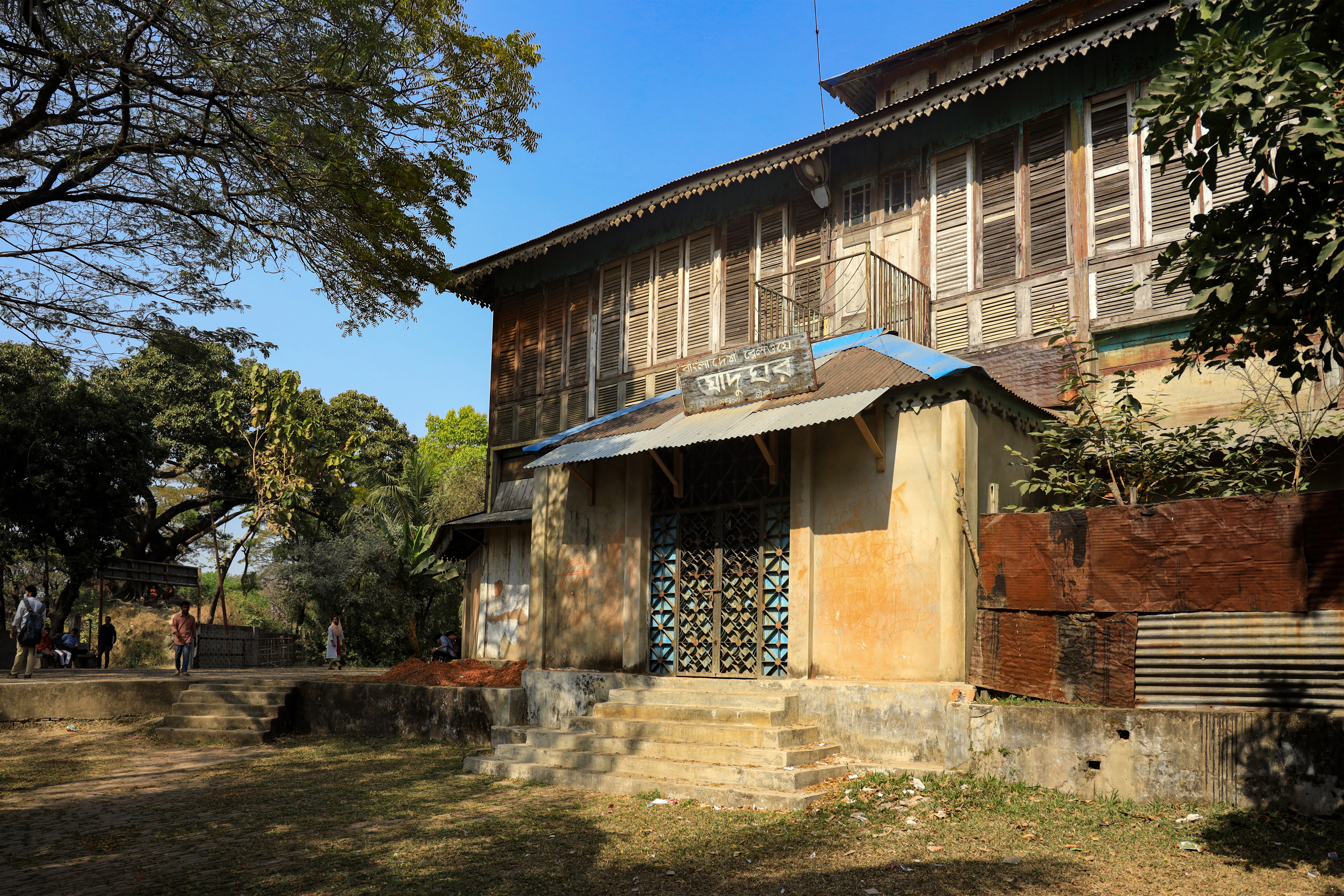
- Museum building

- Location within Bangladesh
- Established: 15 November 2003
- Location: Ambagan road, Pahartali, Chattogram
- Coordinates: 22.354288°N 91.80139303°E
- Type: Public
- Collections: Relics
- Visitors: 150+ (2012)
- Founder: Bangladesh Railway
- In-charge: Golam Mostafa Khondaker
- Curator: Md Jamal
- Owner: Bangladesh Railway

Bangladesh Railway Museum is the sole railway museum of Bangladesh Railway located in Chattogram, Bangladesh. It was a bungalow before it was turned to a museum on 15 November 2003.

== Location ==
The museum is located at Ambagan, Pahartali.
