= Chittagong Circular Railway =

Suburban railway of Chittagong, Bangladesh

Chittagong Circular Railway is a suburban railway system in the city of Chittagong in Bangladesh to relieve congestion and improve the traffic situation in the city. The construction was complete by February 2013 and it became operational by May the same year. The railway is served by high speed DEMU commuter trains, procured from China.
