= Faujdarhat Junction railway station =

Railway station in Chittagong, Bangladesh

Faujdarhat Junction ফৌজদারহাট জংশন
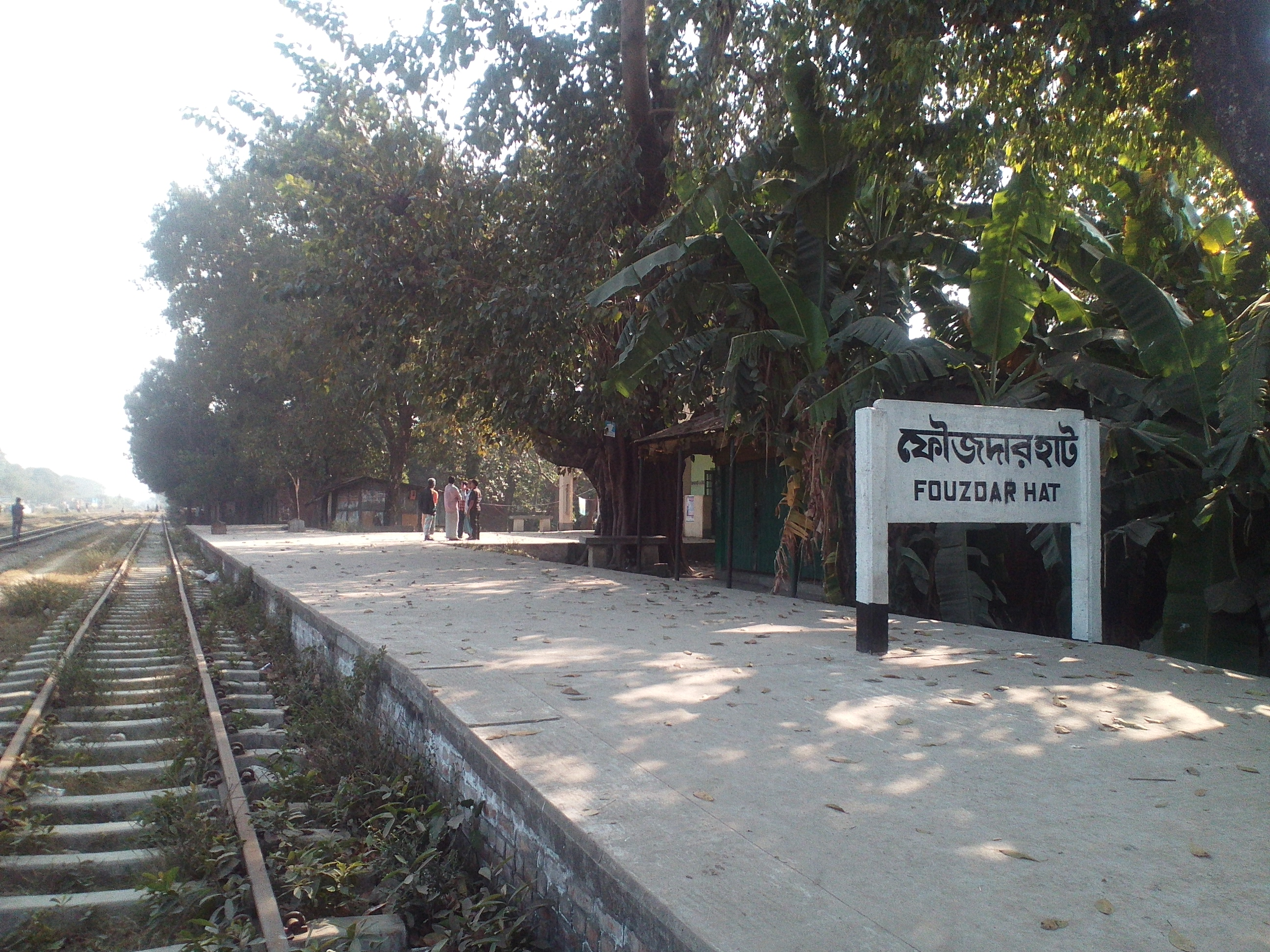

General information
- Location: Faujdarhat, Sitakunda Upazila, Chittagong District; Bangladesh
- Coordinates: 22.4103°N 91.7557°E
- System: Bangladesh Railway Station
- Line: Akhaura–Laksam–Chittagong line
- Tracks: Metre Gauge

Construction
- Structure type: Standard (on ground station)

Other information
- Status: Functioning
- Station code: FJT
- Zone(s): East Zone
- Division(s): Chittagong

History
- Opened: 1898

Services
Preceding station	Faujdarhat Junction railway station	Following station
Bhatiari	Line; Akhaura–Laksam–Chittagong	Kaibalyadham
Location

Faujdarhat Junction Railway Station is situated at Faujdarhat, Chittagong, Bangladesh, at the side of Dhaka-Chittagong highway. It is close to Chittagong Railway Station. It has two platforms.
