= Bangladesh Railway Class 2000 =

Diesel locomotive class of Bangladesh

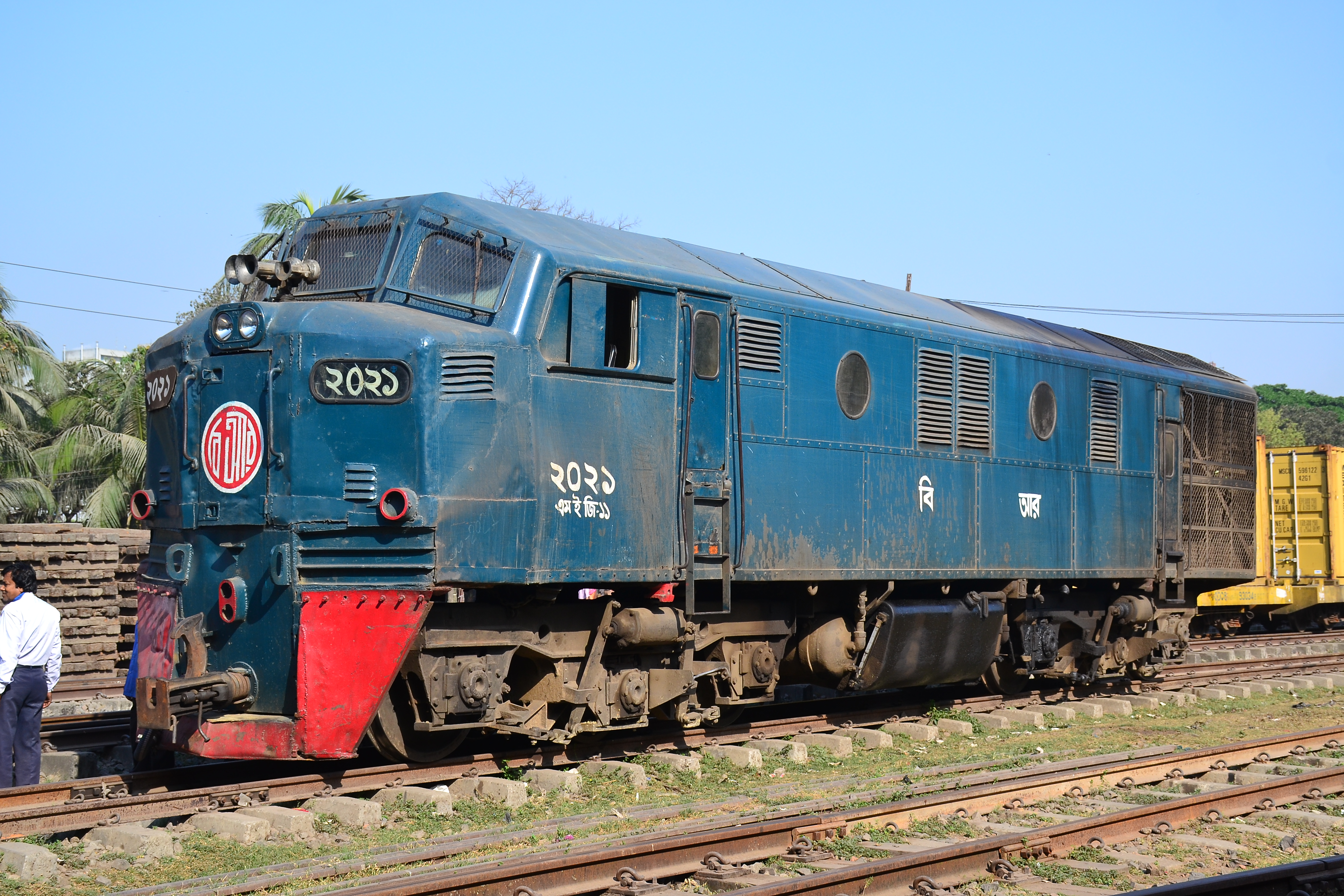
- 2021 at Tongi rail station
Type and origin
- Power type: Diesel-electric
- Designer: Electro Motive Division
- Builder: General Motors Diesel
- Order number: C-155
- Serial number: A443–A482
- Model: EMD B12
- Build date: 1953–1956
- Total produced: 40
Specifications
- Configuration
  - UIC: (A1A)(A1A)
- Wheelbase: A1A-A1A
Performance figures
- Power output: 1,125 hp (839 kW)
Career
- Operators: Eastern Bengal Railway; Bangladesh Railway

Bangladesh Railway Class 2000 is the earliest meter-gauge diesel electric locomotive class of Bangladesh Railway. These locomotives have been in service since 1953 which make them the oldest running locomotives in the history of Bangladesh Railway. A total of 40 locomotives of this class were imported. After providing service for a long periods of time most of these locomotives are no longer in service. Only the serial number 2025 loco is active now.

== Builders details ==
The Class 2000 locomotives were built by General Motors Diesel at its London, Ontario plant, Canada. These 40 locomotives came to the Eastern Bengal Railway in 3 phases. They were:

- 1953: 2000–2009
- 1954: 2010–2025
- 1956: 2026–2039

These locomotives were painted and delivered in Eastern Bengal Railway yellow-black livery before changing to red and then to green/yellow-green after the Independence of Bangladesh in 1971.

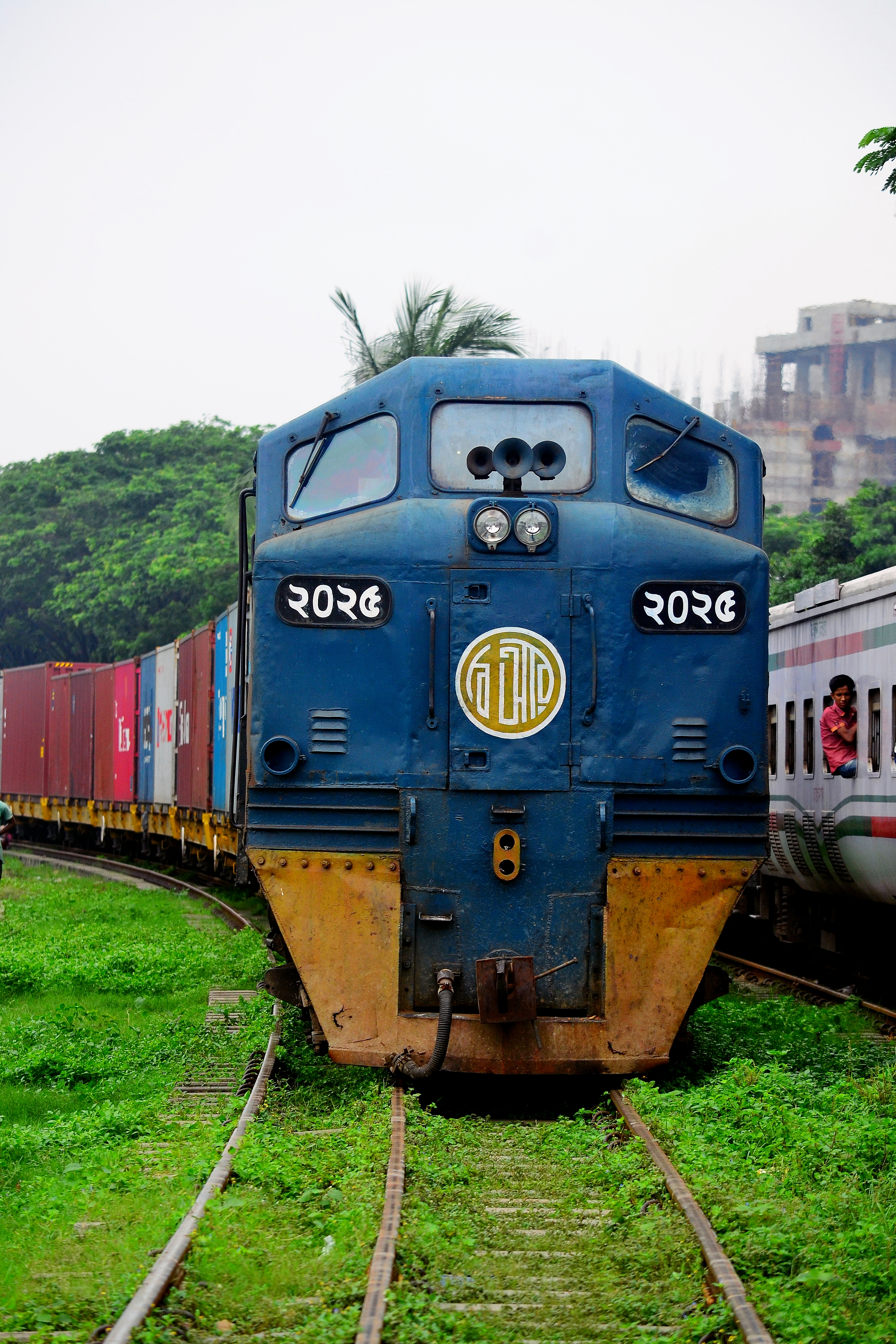
BR locomotive 2025 with Container train

== Technical details ==
The Class 2000 is an 1100 hp Locomotive. The Electro Motive Division export model of his locomotive is EMD B12. It uses a 12-cylinder EMD 567 diesel prime mover. The wheel arrangement of this locomotive is A1A-A1A. The Class 2000 locomotives have a similar specification to the Vitoria-Minas Railroad Estrada de Ferro Vitória a Minas locomotives of Brazil.

The Bangladesh Railway specification of this locomotive is 'M.E.G -11'. Here - M stands for meter-gauge, E Stands for diesel electric, G stands for General Motors and 11 stands for locomotive horsepower (x100).

== Usage ==
In the early days, Class 2000 locomotives were heavily used for prominent Bangladeshi trains like Ulka Express, Mohanagar Express, Parabat Express etc. Currently, class 2000 locomotives are being used for freight trains. Due to several mechanical constraints, they are not used in passenger service unless an emergency situation occurs.

The Class 2000 locomotive was considered a lifeline for freight services of Bangladesh Railway until new class of locomotives added to the service. It pulls containers, oil tankers and other departmental freight trains regularly across the country.

== Active locomotives ==
- 2025,2023

== Maintenance ==
The Class 2000 Locomotives are maintained by Diesel Workshop at Pahartali, Chittagong. These locomotives are not allowed to cross Bangabandhu Bridge due to mechanical restrictions. Therefore, they cannot go to Central Locomotive Workshop (CLW) at Parbatipur, Dinajpur for maintenance.
