= Sylhet railway station =

Railway station in Bangladesh

Sylhet সিলেট
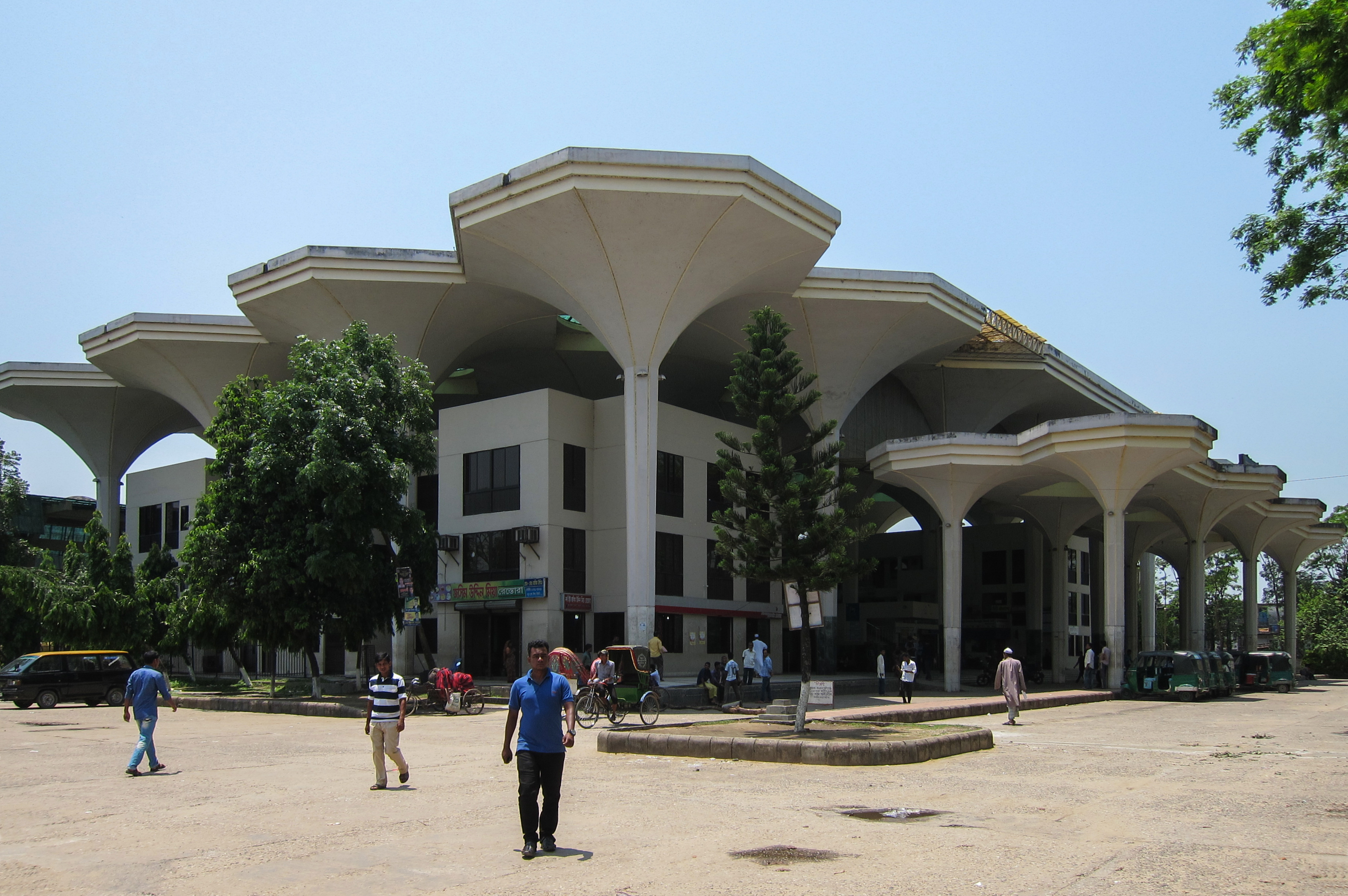
- Sylhet railway station

General information
- Location: Sylhet Sadar Upazila, Sylhet District; Sylhet Division; Bangladesh
- Coordinates: 23°43′55″N 90°25′34″E
- Owner: Bangladesh Railway
- Operator: Bangladesh Railway
- Line: Akhaura–Kulaura–Chhatak line
- Platforms: 3
- Train operators: Eastern Railway, Bangladesh

Construction
- Parking: Yes
- Cycle facilities: Yes
- Accessible: Disabled access Computerized Ticketing Counters Luggage Checking System Food Plaza Kiosks WC Taxi Stand Public Transportation

Other information
- Status: Functioning
- Station code: SYT
- Website: www.railway.gov.bd

History
- Opened: 1912; 114 years ago
Route map
Location

Sylhet railway station is a railway station in Bangladesh. There are two types of rail lines in Bangladesh Meter gauge and Broad gauge. This station is connected with meter-gauge link on both sides from Chhatak and Dhaka. This railway station is situated in Sylhet city.

The newly formed Sylhet railway station was inaugurated in 2004. With the supervision of A.K. Rafique Uddin Ahmed, representing Engineering and Planning Consultants Ltd., was the chief architect of the project. The station has three platforms

== History ==
In response to the demands of the Assam tea planters for a railway link to Chittagong port, Assam Bengal Railway started construction of a railway track on the eastern side of Bengal in 1891. A 150 kilometres (93 mi) track between Chittagong and Comilla was opened to traffic in 1895. The Comilla–Akhaura–Kulaura–Badarpur section was opened in 1896–98 and extended to Lumding by 1903.

The Kulaura-Sylhet section was opened 1912–15, the Shaistaganj-Habiganj branch line in 1928, the Shaistaganj–Balla branch line in 1929 and the Sylhet–Chhatak Bazar line in 1954.

A metre gauge link exists between Shahbajpur in Bangladesh and Mahisasan in India.

== Location ==
Being located between Sylhet-Dhaka Highway and Sylhet Bipass Road, this station is easily accessible from any direction. It is adjacent to Kodomttoli Bus Terminal, from where one travel all over the country by bus. Keane, a historical bridge on the Surma River, and Sylhet Polytechnic Institute are only half km away from the station.

== Train services ==
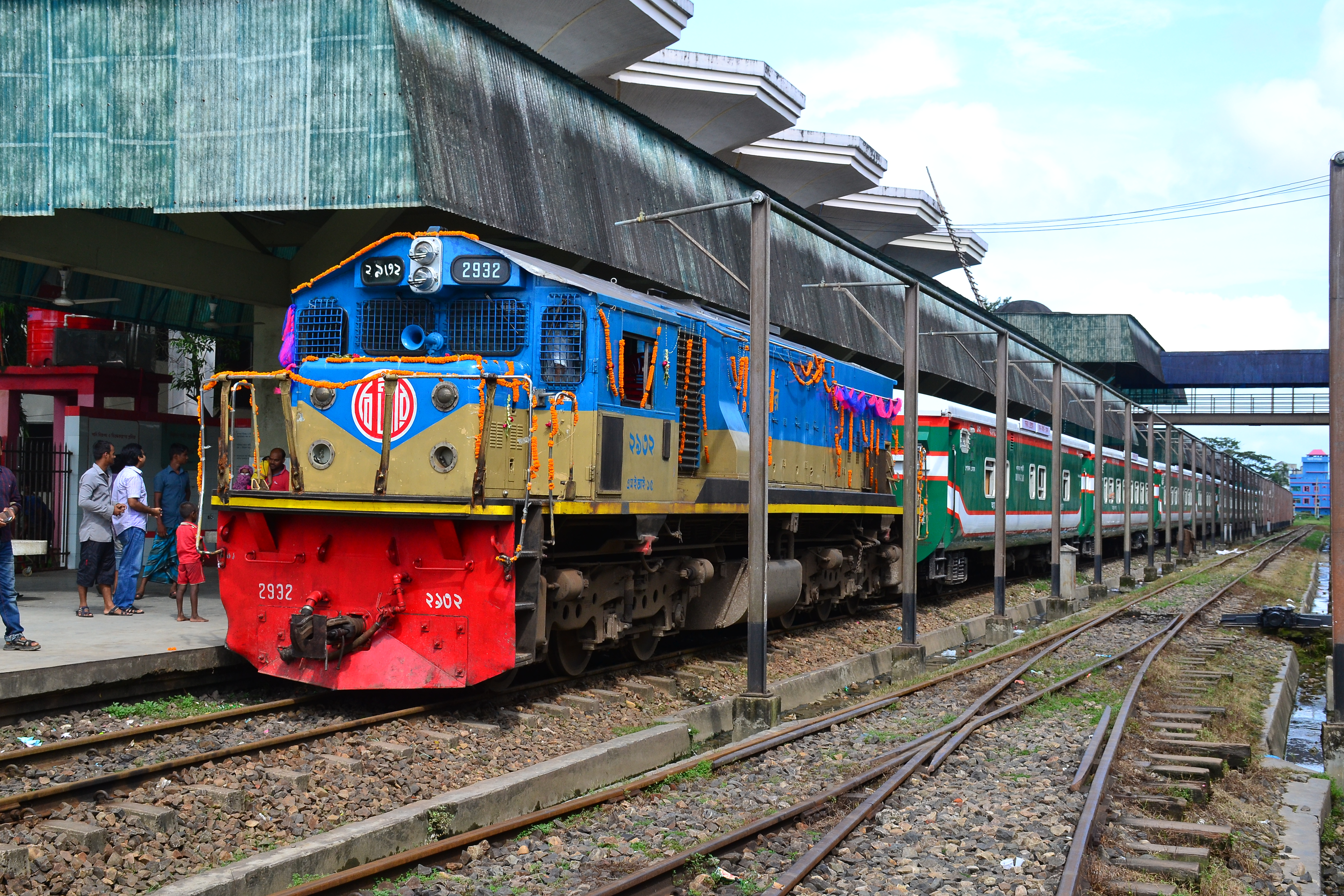
Parabat Express at Sylhet railway station

Parabat, Joyontika, Upobon and Kalni Express are available to go Dhaka directly from Sylhet. The one-way journey takes a little over seven hours. There also are trains to Chittagong from the railway station. Paharhika express is available for Chittagong-Sylhet route. Sylhet railway station has connected all the country with the division via Akhaura–Kulaura–Chhatak line.

== Outlook ==
Sylhet railway station is a somewhat reflection of Kamalapur railway station's style. This lotus-shaped shell structure covering functional buildings like an umbrella, fascinates the people. The station contains two ticket counters. The station has three platforms and there are two restaurants beside the two sides of the ticket counters. There are also some fast food shops near the ticket counters.

== Present condition ==
Besides many intercity express, local trains also transport through the station. Homeless people take shelter at the night time in the station. The station has its own security guards, station masters, along with a station manager. Daily, thousands of people come through the station. People can go to Dhaka, Comilla, Chittagong, Chhatak, etc. directly from the station. The platforms are always populated when the trains stop and before starting. To ensure the security and control the area there are many police and guards inside and outside of the station. The old platform turned into a railway police station.
