= Bangladesh Railway Class 2900 =

Diesel electric locomotive class

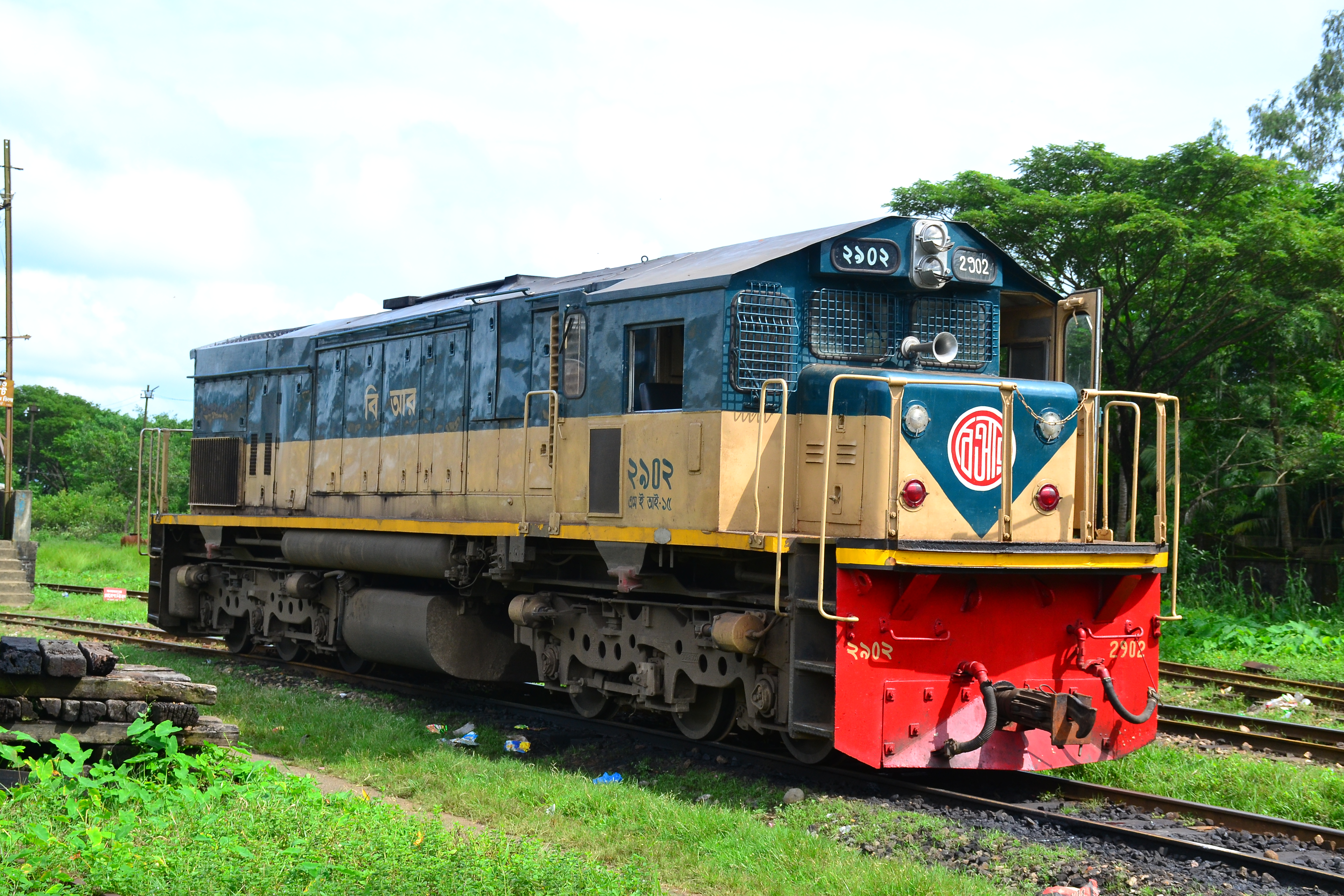
- Locomotive 2902 at Sylhet railway station
Type and origin
- Power type: Diesel-electric
- Designer: Electro Motive Division
- Builder: Hyundai Rotem
- Model: EMD GT18LC-2
- Build date: 1999-2013
- Total produced: 39
Specifications
- Gauge: Metre gauge
- Wheelbase: A1A-A1A
- Loco weight: 72 tons
- Prime mover: EMD 8-645E3C
Performance figures
- Maximum speed: 107 km/h (66 mph)
- Power output: 1500 hp
Career
- Numbers: 2901-2939
- Current owner: Bangladesh Railway

The Bangladesh Railway Class 2900 is a class of meter-gauge diesel electric locomotive operated by the Bangladesh Railway.

== History ==
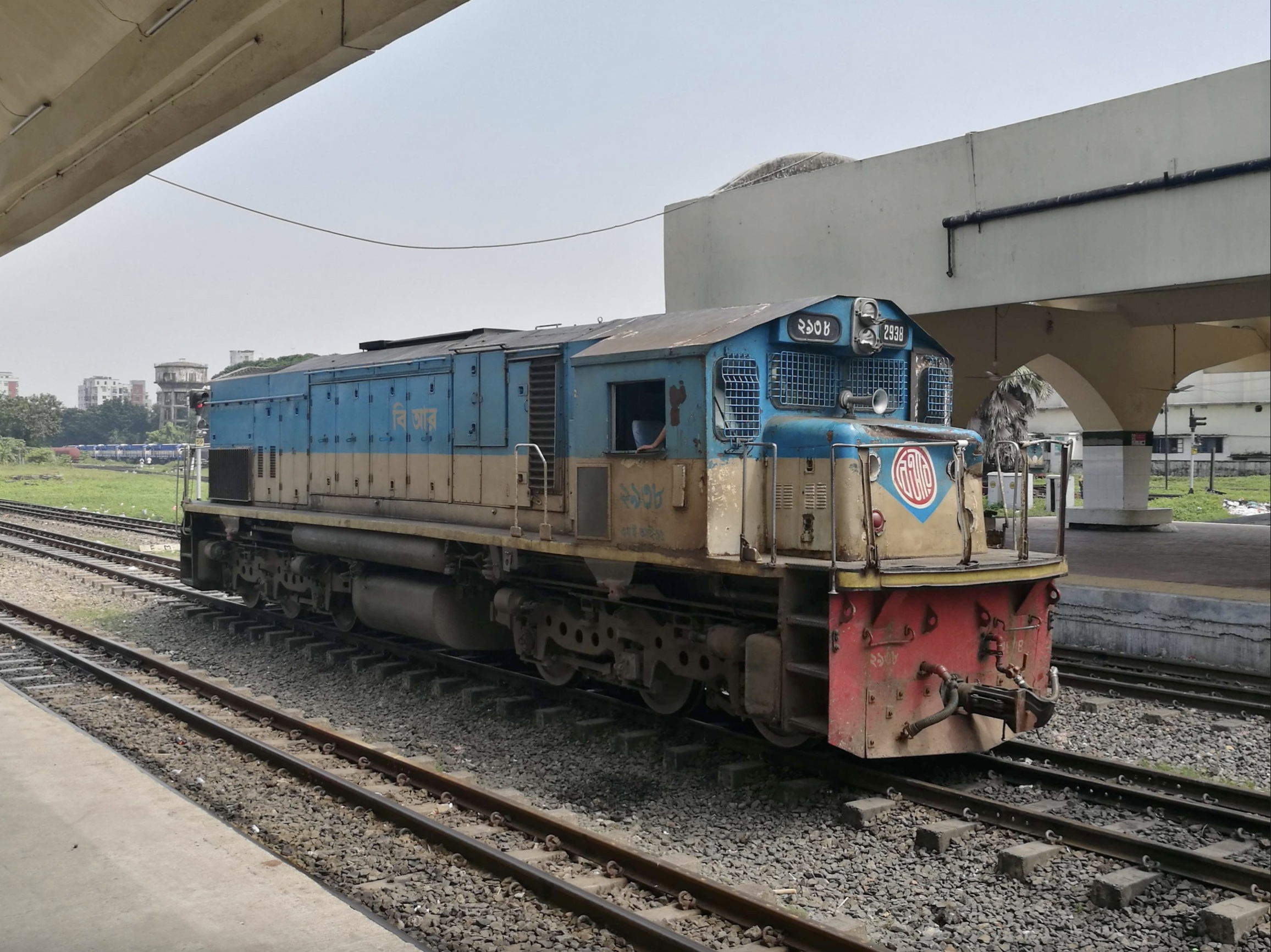
2938 at Kamalapur railway station

Thirty-nine Class 2900 locomotives were built under licence to Electro Motive Division by Hyundai Rotem in South Korea between 1999 and 2013.

== Technical details ==
The Class 2900 is a 1500 hp locomotive built to Electro Motive Division's GT18LC-2 design. The wheel arrangement of this locomotive is A1A-A1A. This locomotive can speed up to 107 kilometres per hour (66 mph) with passenger trains. Class 2900 locomotives have a similar specification to the Class 2600 locomotives.

== Usage ==
The Class 2900 locomotive operate both passenger services and freight services including the Subarna Express, Sonarbangla Express, Parabat Express and Lalmoni Express.

== Accidents and incidents ==
Locomotive no. 2933 was one of the newest locomotives of Class 2900, which met a fatal accident in Noyapara upazila, Habiganj district, on 7 October 2016. The locomotive caught fire soon after it derailed with the Parabat Express near Noapara railway station. The driver's cab and electrical cabinet of the locomotive were completely destroyed in the fire. As of December 2019, this locomotive is awaiting heavy repair.

Locomotive 2923 was hauling the Turna Nishita passenger train, which overran a red signal and collided head-on with the Udayan Express at Mondobhag railway station, Kasba, on 12 November 2019. Sixteen people were killed and over 100 were injured. As of December 2019, Locomotive 2923 has been repaired and has rejoined the locomotive fleet in service.
