= Kalni Express =

Train in Bangladesh

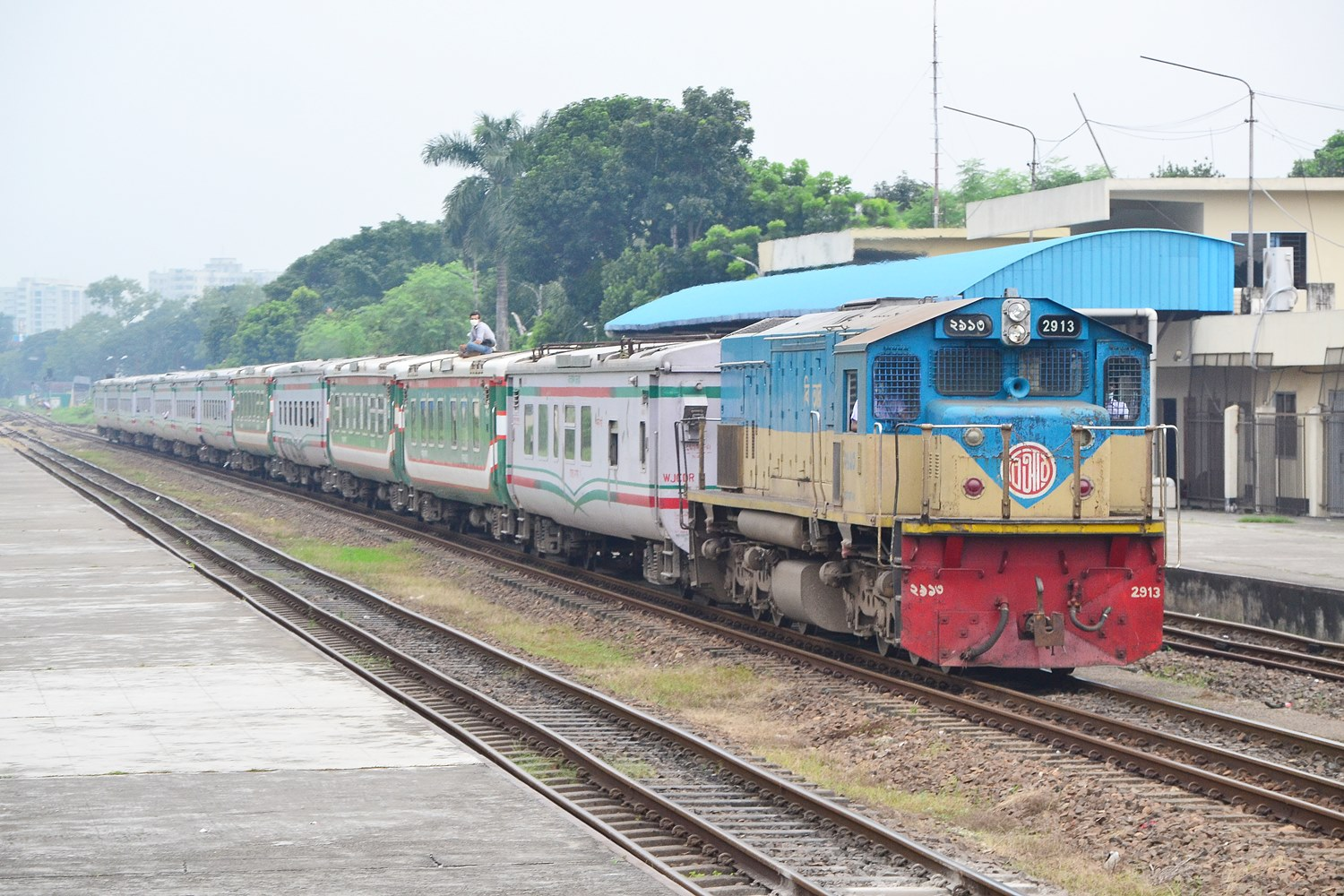

Overview
- Status: Operating
- Locale: Bangladesh
- First service: May 13, 2012
- Website: www.railway.gov.bd

Route
- Stops: 9
- Average journey time: 6 hours & 45 minutes
- Service frequency: 6 days each week

Technical
- Rolling stock: One 2900 Class Locomotive; Three AC Chair carriages; One generator car; Two Guard brake Carriages; Six Chair carriages

Kalni Express (Train no. 773/774) is an intercity train which runs between Dhaka (capital of Bangladesh) and Sylhet (north-eastern major city). Kalni Express was conceived to be the non stop train of Dhaka-Sylhet route of Bangladesh Railway but it has since lost that status.

== History ==
Kalni Express made its inaugural run on 15 May 2012 with a view to meet demands of increasing passengers of Dhaka-Sylhet route . The train started its inaugural journey with total 12 carriages including an AC carriage.

== Schedule ==
The train runs between Dhaka and Sylhet district while touching other districts like Kishoreganj, Brahmanbaria, Habiganj and Maulavibazar. It departs Dhaka railway station at 02:55 PM (Bangladesh Standard Time) and arrives Sylhet at 09:30 PM. In return trip, it departs Sylhet at 06:15 AM and arrives Dhaka at 12:55 PM. Friday is the weekly holiday of this train.

== Stoppages ==
- Dhaka Bimanbondor
- Bhairab Bazar Junction (Only For 774)
- Narsingdi (Only For 774)
- Brahmanbaria
- Azampur
- Harashpur
- Shaiestaganj
- Sreemangal
- Shamshernagar
- Kulaura
- Maijgaon
