= Bangladesh Railway =

State owned rail transport agency of Bangladesh

- Logo of Bangladesh Railway
- Native name: বাংলাদেশ রেলওয়ে
- Type: State-owned
- Industry: Rail Transport
- Predecessor: Pakistan Eastern Railway
- Founded: 15 November 1862; 164 years ago
- Headquarters: Dhaka, Bangladesh
- Area served: Bangladesh
- Key people: Md Afzal Hossen (Director General of Bangladesh Railway)
- Revenue: ৳6421.791 million (2024)
- Net income: ▲6421 (2024)
- Owner: Government of Bangladesh
- Number of employees: 27,535 (2015)
- Divisions: East Zone, West Zone
- Website: www.railway.gov.bd

Bangladesh Rail

Operation
- National railway: Ministry of Railways
- Major operators: Bangladesh Railway

Statistics
- Ridership: 18 million (2024)
- Passenger-distance: 8,135 million
- Freight: 2.52 million tonnes

System length
- Total: 3,600 kilometres (2,200 mi)
- Double track: 1,600 kilometres (990 mi)

Track gauge
- Metre gauge: 2,025 kilometres (1,258 mi)
- Broad gauge: 1,575 kilometres (979 mi)
- Dual gauge: 1,600 kilometres (990 mi)

Features
- No. of bridges: 3,650; 546 (Major); 3,104 (Minor)
- Longest bridge: Padma Bridge (broad gauge, 6,150 metres (20,180 ft)); Jamuna Railway Bridge (dual gauge double line, 4,800 metres (15,700 ft)); Hardinge Bridge (broad gauge double line, 1,798 metres (5,899 ft)); Meghna Bridge (meter gauge double line, 984 metres (3,228 ft))
- No. of stations: 515

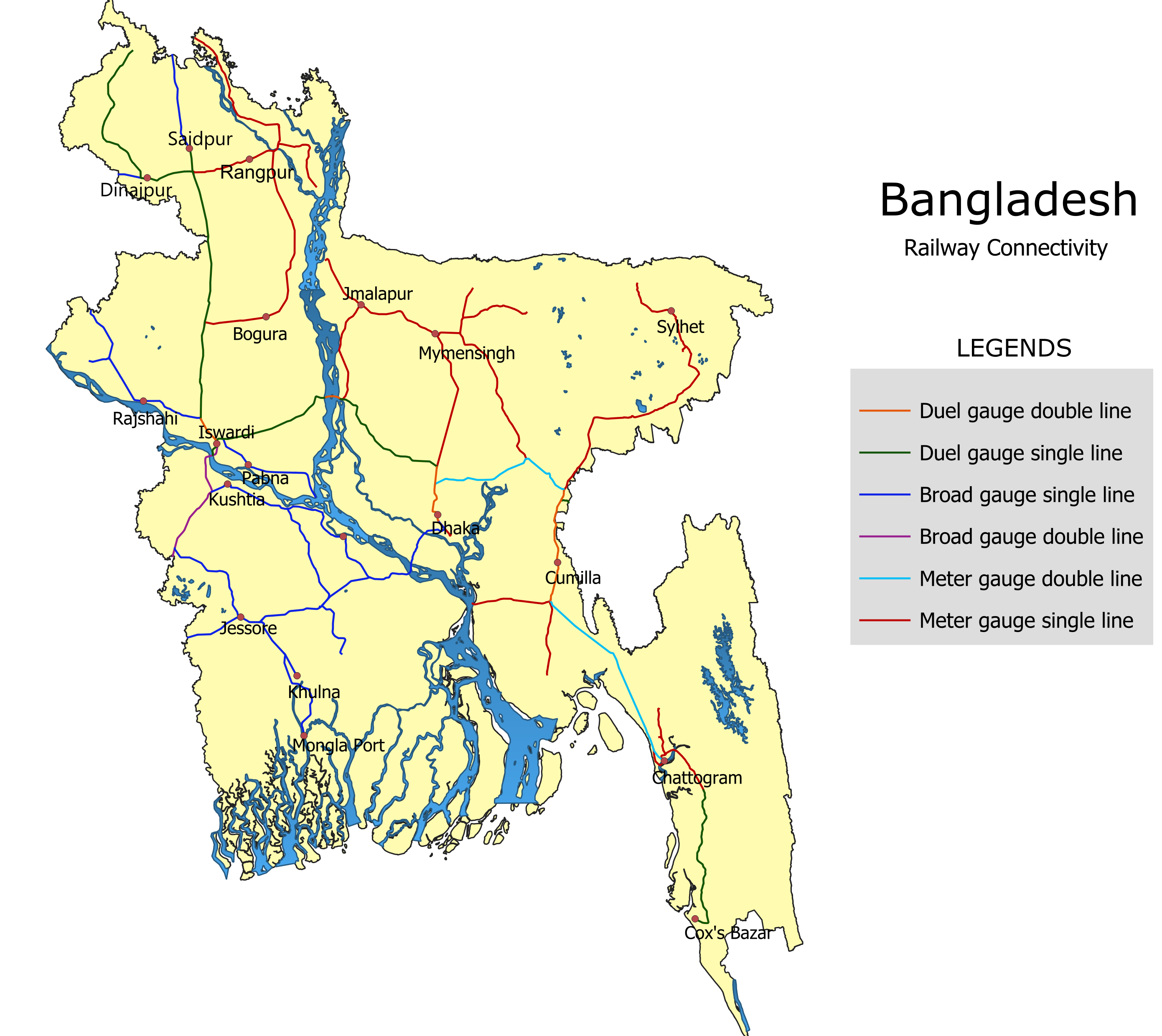
Railway connectivity map of Bangladesh (As of 2025)

Bangladesh Railway (Bengali: বাংলাদেশ রেলওয়ে) is the state-owned rail transport agency of Bangladesh. Bangladesh Railway was not established under a specific new act, but rather operates under the framework of The Railways Act, 1890 (Act No. IX of 1890). It operates and maintains all railways in the country, and is overseen by the Directorate General of Bangladesh Railway. The Bangladesh Railway is governed by the Ministry of Railways and the Bangladesh Railway Authority with a reporting mark known as "BR".

The Bangladesh Railway system has a total length of 3,600 kilometres (2,200 mi). In 2009, it had 34,168 employees working for the operations. In the year 2014, Bangladesh Railway recorded a ridership of 65 million passengers for a total of 8,135 million passenger-kilometres, and transported 2.52 million tonnes of freight racking up to 677 million tonne-kilometres.

== History ==
Rail transport in Bangladesh (formerly known as British India and then East Pakistan) began on 15 November 1862, when 53.11 km of 5 ft 6 in (1,676 mm) (broad gauge) line was opened between Darshana in Chuadanga District and Jogotee in Kushtia District. On 1 January 1871, an extension of the Darshana-Jogotee Railway line was made up to Goalanda by Eastern Bengal Railway. On 4 January 1885, a further 14.98 km and 1,000 mm (3 ft 3 3/8 in) (metre gauge) line was opened. In 1891, the Bengal Assam Railway was constructed with the assistance of the government and later managed by the Bengal Assam Railway Company.

On 1 July 1895, two sections of metre gauge railway were constructed by English railway companies. One railway connected Chattogram and Comilla, with a distance of 150.6 kilometres (93.6 mi). Another was the connection built between Laksam Upazila and Chandpur, with a distance of 51.2 kilometres (31.8 mi).

In 1947, at the time of the Partition of India, the Bengal Assam Railway was divided into two parts. The 2,603.92 km of track located in East Pakistan came under the control of the central Government of Pakistan. On 1 February 1961, the Eastern Bengal Railway was renamed the Pakistan Eastern Railway. In 1962, control of the Pakistan Eastern Railway was transferred to the Government of East Pakistan. On 9 June 1962, by order of the president, the Pakistan Eastern Railway management was assumed by a Railway Board.

As of 2005, the total length of the Bangladesh Railway is 3,600 kilometres (2,200 mi). It was composed of 1,225 kilometres (761 mi) of broad gauge track (mostly in the western region), 1,600 kilometres (990 mi) of metre gauge track (mostly in the central and eastern regions) and 1,600 kilometres (990 mi) of dual gauge track. In 1998, the Jamuna Bridge was built to connect the previously divided east and west rail networks in dual gauge.

Bangladesh is currently converting its railway system to a dual-gauge system to enable both broad-gauge and meter-gauge trains to run. It is also developing extensive railway transport relations with India. With the Bangladeshi and Indian governments working side by side, at least 9 International Rail Transit Systems (IRTS) have come up presently in Bangladesh. They are as follows: -

1. Kolkata-Darsana-Iswardi-Dhaka;
2. Kolkata-Bangaon-Jessore-Khulna;
3. New Jalpaiguri-Haldibari-Chilahati-Iswardi-Dhaka;
4. Changrabandha-Burimari-Lalmonirhat-Teesta-Kaunia-Parbatipur;
5. Parbatipur-Dinajpur-Birol-Radhikapur-Raiganj-Barsoi;
6. Badarpur-Karimganj-Maishasan-Shabazpur-Kulaura-Sylhet/Chittagong;
7. Agartala-Akhaura-Dhaka/Chittagong;
8. Old Malda-Singhabad-Rohanpur-Rajshahi;
9. Eklakhi-Balurghat-Hili.

While routes 1, 2, 3, 5, and 8 are already operational, routes 4 and 6 are being restored, with routes 7 and 9 currently nearing construction completion.

In 2010, funding was received for a bridge over the Titas River. In September 2010, the Government of Bangladesh approved ten rail development projects costing 19·9 billion Bangladeshi taka including plans for new tracks and rolling stock. To bolster the bilateral ties between India and Bangladesh, the Ministry of Railways in India has supplied 20 Broad Gauge (BG) locomotives to its eastern neighbour, thus contributing to the railway infrastructure of Bangladesh. These locomotives have been appropriately modified by the Indian side to align with the requirements of Bangladesh Railway. The provision of these locomotives will aid in managing the growing volume of passenger and freight train operations in Bangladesh, thereby supporting the enhancement of its railway system. It is worth noting that previously, in June 2020, the Indian Government had granted 10 locomotives to Bangladesh, further contributing to the improvement of its railways.

In 2011, Sheikh Hasina Wazed, the then Prime Minister of Bangladesh, officiated at the start of construction of a link that would cross several rivers to reach Cox's Bazar. The 100 kilometres (62 mi) of dual-gauge line started from the railhead at Dohazari, southeast of Chittagong. The plan was to reach Satkania, Dulahazra, Chakarin, Edgaon, Ramu, and Cox's Bazar, with four major river bridges and a 30 kilometres (19 mi) branch from Ramu to Gundum. In 2013, the Chhattogram Circular Railway was completed.

In 2015, construction of a 16 kilometres (9.9 mi) branch to Agartala, Tripura in Northeast India commenced. In 2017, land acquisition took place to facilitate the construction.

In 2022, construction of the 6,250 metres (20,510 ft) long Padma Bridge was completed and the bridge was thrown open after inauguration by Sheikh Hasina Wazed, the Prime Minister of Bangladesh to connect Dhaka with Faridpur via Narayanganj.

== Structure ==
From the end of the Bangladesh Liberation War in 1971 until 1982, the railway was governed by a Railway Board. It then came under the Railway Division of the Ministry of Communications. The Director General of the railway was the Secretary of the Railway Division of the Ministry of Communications. In 1995, governance of the railway was assumed by the "Bangladesh Railway Authority" which was chaired by the Minister of Railways. Inspections are made by an external government authority.

The features of Bangladesh Railway include the usage of several gauges and the division of the rail system by the Jamuna River, Brahmaputra into the Western Zone and the Eastern Zone of operations. Crossing the river is one bridge, the Jamuna Bridge which was completed in 2003.

The East Zone and the West Zone each have a General Manager who answers to the Director General of the Railway Authority. Each zone has its own raft of departments for operation, maintenance, and finances. Each zone is divided into two divisions with departments for personnel, transportation, commercial, finance mechanical, way and works signalling, telecommunication, electrical and medical services.

The East Zone has a workshop division in Pahartali. The West Zone's workshop division is in Saidpur. The railway has a central locomotive workshop for broad and metre gauge locomotives in Parbatipur. It also has a Railway Training Academy. There are diesel workshops in Pahartali, Dhaka and Parbatipur. Maintenance on coaches and wagons is carried out at the "C and W" shop in Saidpur, Nilphamari and at the "C and W" shop Pahartali.

=== Employees ===
Bangladesh Railway has a total of 25,083 regular employees as of 2020.

In 1974, they were represented by three registered trade unions, but by 1999 that had multiplied to eight. According to Chittagong University professor of management Md. Abu Taher, this proliferation weakened the unions and undermined solidarity among the workers.

Bangladesh Railway began recruiting women into its top ranks in 2001. Salma Khatun became their first female train driver in 2004 when she joined as an assistant locomaster (ALM). As of 2015, the railway employed 788 ALMs. By 2022, the number of female train drivers had risen to 19. Because of the lack of overnight facilities, and even toilets, for female staff, most prefer the shorter shuttle routes over long distance ones. As of 2019, a total of about two dozen women worked in the railway's mechanical engineering, electrical engineering, civil engineering, stores, traffic, and signals divisions.

== Rolling stock ==
=== Locomotives ===
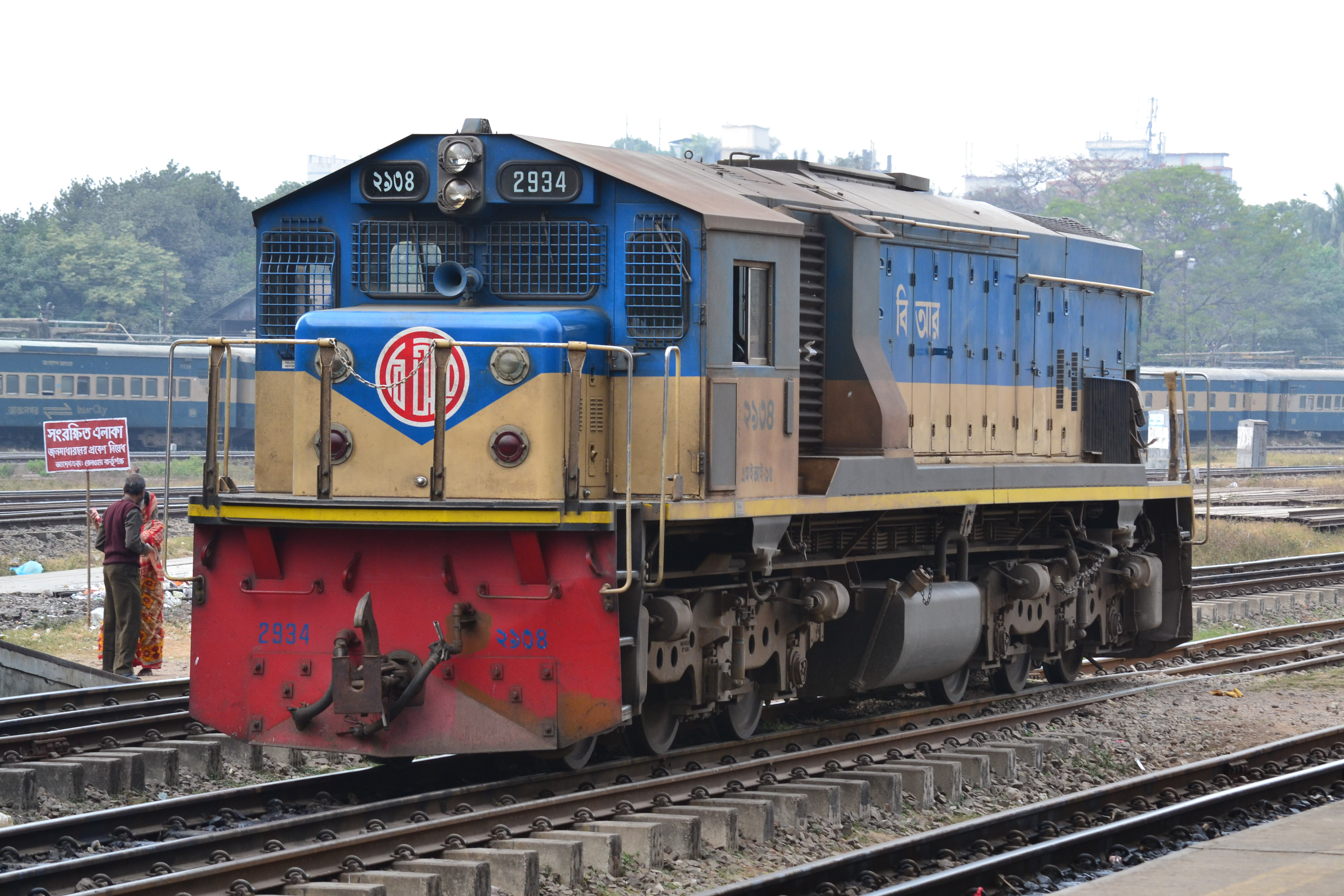
Bangladesh Railway Class 2900 locomotive

==== Diesel ====
Bangladesh Railway's fleet of diesel locomotives includes both diesel-electric and diesel-hydraulic machines. In 2007, there were 77 broad gauge diesel-electric locomotives. In 2012, Bangladesh Railway ordered 16 new broad gauge locomotives of 3100 hp from Banaras Locomotive Works, India. There were also 208 metre gauge diesel-electric locomotives including those of classes 2000, 2600, 2700, and 2900. The total number was 285.

In 2013, the government purchased 20 sets of diesel-electric multiple unit (DEMU) trains from China for the first time, aiming to improve short-distance train travel services. However, all 20 DEMU sets have been abandoned ten years later due to lack of maintenance.

In 2019, 40 EMD GT42ACLs were ordered from Progress Rail.

On 27 July 2020 and 24 May 2023 Indian Railways (IR) handed over 10 and 20 WDM-3D diesel locomotives to Bangladesh Railway under its "grant assistance" plan. The vehicles cost an estimated ₹600 million ($US 8 million) to manufacture.

==== Steam ====
A small number of steam locomotives are preserved in Bangladesh.

Location	Class	Builder	Wheel arrangement	Gauge	Image
Dhaka Railway HQ	YD 718	Nippon Sharyo, Japan	2-8-2	Metre gauge 1,000 mm (3 ft 3 3/8 in)	
Saidpur Works	CS 15	W. G. Bagnall, England	2-4-0T	Narrow Gauge 2 ft 6 in (762 mm)	
Saidpur Works	SGC-2 240	Vulcan Foundry, England	0-6-0	Broad Gauge 5 ft 6 in (1,676 mm)	
Paksay Railway HQ	CB 8	Vulcan Foundry, England	2-4-0T	Narrow Gauge 2 ft 6 in (762 mm)	
Pahartoli Works	CB 7	Vulcan Foundry, England	2-4-0T	Narrow Gauge 2 ft 6 in (762 mm)	
Rajshahi Railway HQ	HPS 30	Vulcan Foundry, England	4-6-0	Broad Gauge 5 ft 6 in (1,676 mm)	
National Scout Training Center, Mouchak, Gazipur	RC 233	Kawasaki, Japan	4-6-0	Metre gauge 1,000 mm (3 ft 3 3/8 in)	

The 762 mm gauge locomotives are from the Rupsa–Bagerhat railway which was the only 762 mm gauge line in East Pakistan in 1947. It was changed to 1,676 mm gauge in 1970.

== Freight and cargo services ==
As a national carrier, Bangladesh Railway is obliged to carry essential commodities such as grain and fertiliser to remote parts of Bangladesh at discounted rates. Bangladesh Railway transports containers from the Port of Chittagong to Dhaka Inland Container Depot, where there are customs facilities. The rolling stock to carry containers was manufactured from existing stock. On 5 August 1991, a container-only train came into service. A goods train operates from Singhabad and Petrapole, India to Rohanpur and Benapole, Bangladesh.

=== Accidents ===
- On 10 July 2014, a major freight train accident occurred near Faujdarhat Railway Station at 6.30 am. A freight train from Patenga was carrying furnace oil to a power plant, but near Faujdarhat the train derailed and leaked around 21,255 imp gal (96,630 L; 25,526 US gal) of furnace oil. Six wagons of the train derailed and oil from three of the wagons flowed into a nearby canal.
- On 14 September 2016, a freight train derailed in the Faujdarhat area. The loco driver and the assistant driver were injured.

== Passenger services ==
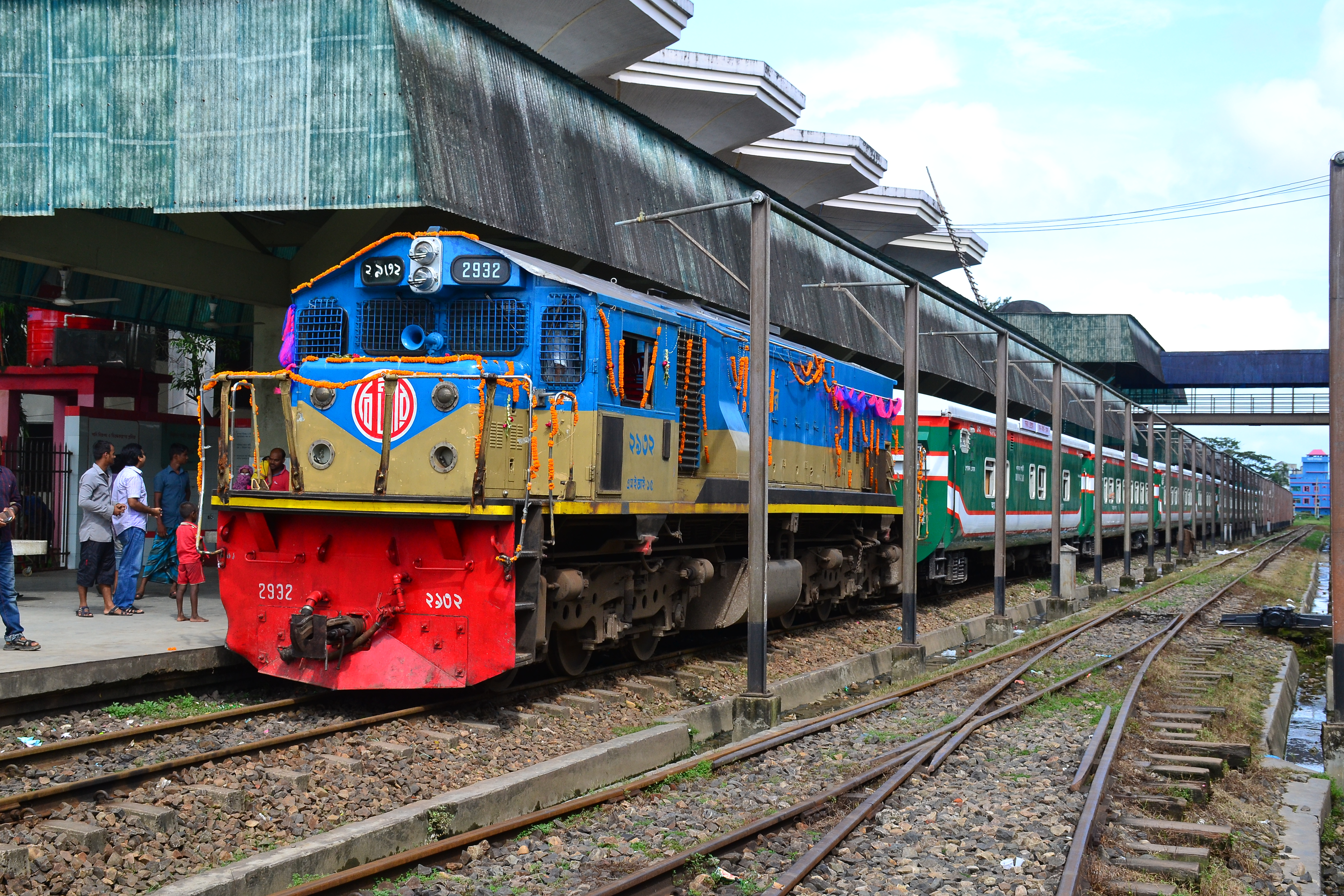
Parabat Express at Sylhet railway station

Railway is a principal mode of transport in Bangladesh. In the 2005 financial year, 42 million passengers travelled on the Bangladesh Railway. Inter-city services, contribute to over seventy percent of Bangladesh Railway's revenue. In 2014, the railway owned 312 broad gauge coaches and 1,164 metre gauge coaches.

In 2017, Bangladesh Railway operated 90 inter-city trains (up and down), 52 mail or express trains, 64 commuter trains (DEMU), 135 shuttle or local trains and 2 international services.

Two times per week, a passenger train operates a service to India. In April 2008, the Maitri Express between Dhaka and Kolkata came into operation on the Gede – Darsana route 400 kilometres (250 mi). On 9 November 2017, a new weekly train, the Bandhan Express, came into operation between Khulna and Kolkata via Petrapole and Benapole 176 kilometres (109 mi). Recently in 2021, another new weekly train, the Mitali Express, came into operation between New Jalpaiguri and Dhaka via Parbatipur and Iswardi 500 kilometres (310 mi).

In addition, many inter-city rail services operate between the nation's two largest cities, Dhaka and Chattogram. Such services may include: The Sonar Bangla Express, Suburno Express, Mohanagar Express, Turna Express, and Chattala Express services. These services provide many options for Bangladeshis to travel between the two destinations.

Tickets for Bangladesh Railway services are available at all stations. Most stations are computerized and tickets, which can be purchased within four days of departure, are printed. Full refunds (excluding clerical charges) are available up until two days before departure. The railway reserves ten percent of tickets for online sales. Of these tickets, fifteen percent are reserved for mobile phone sales.

=== Accidents ===
- On 19 April 1965, Pakistan army attacked Parbatipur-Sealdah East Bengal Mail, Goalundo Ghat-Sealdah East Bengal Express , killing 200 passengers on board these trains. These incidents stopped rail connections between West Bengal and East Bengal until 2008.
- On 1970, the Bhola Cyclone destroyed railway line and connections between Khulna and Barisal via Bagerhat.
- On 12 February 1971(date disputed), East Pakistan army bombed at least 10 passenger trains throughout Dhaka, Rajshahi, Khulna, Chittagong and Sylhet in connection to Military Operation Searchlight. Nearly 1000 people died with many injured.
- On 11 July 2006, a train collided with a crowded bus at an unmanned railroad crossing at Akkelpur Upazila, Jaipurhat District. Thirty-three people died and thirty were injured.
- On 13 October 2007, the rear carriages of the Probhati Express derailed near Dhaka. Four people died and fifty were injured.
- On 16 April 2008, a Dinajpur – Dhaka Ekota express train collided with a local bus on a level crossing on the outskirts of Kalihati, Tangail District. Eighteen people died and thirty were injured.
- On 14 May 2008, an Upaban express train crashed into the rear of a Noakhali express train at the Ashuganj Upazila station, Brahmanbaria District. Eight people died and one hundred were injured.
- On 8 December 2010, a collision between two passenger trains killed at least ten people.
- On 23 June 2019, several bogies of Dhaka-bound Upaban Express train from Sylhet veered off the tracks at around 11:40 pm after a culvert over the Barochhara Canal broke down, 200 yards off Baramchal Railway Station. At least five people died and hundreds were injured. Locals who worked overnight with the first responders claimed at least 10-15 people have been killed.
- On 12 November 2019, At least 16 passengers died and score other injured as Dhaka-bound Turni Nishita Express rammed Chattogram-bound Udayan Express from Sylhet at Mandobagh Railway Station in Kasba.
- On 14 November 2019, Two days after a deadly train crash in Brahmanbaria, Rangpur Express, bound from Dhaka to Rangpur, braced an accident at Ullapara station in Sirajganj at around 2pm on Thursday. Seven compartments of Rangpur Express, including its engine and power car, derailed in the Ullapara Railway Station area and a fire broke out in three of its compartments.
- On 5 January 2024, fire broke out at about 9 p.m. (1500 GMT), injuring eight passengers as it spread to four compartments of the Benapole Express headed for the capital city, Dhaka.Witnesses claim fire was due to arson in protest of National Elections scheduled for 7 January 2024.

=== Accommodation classes ===
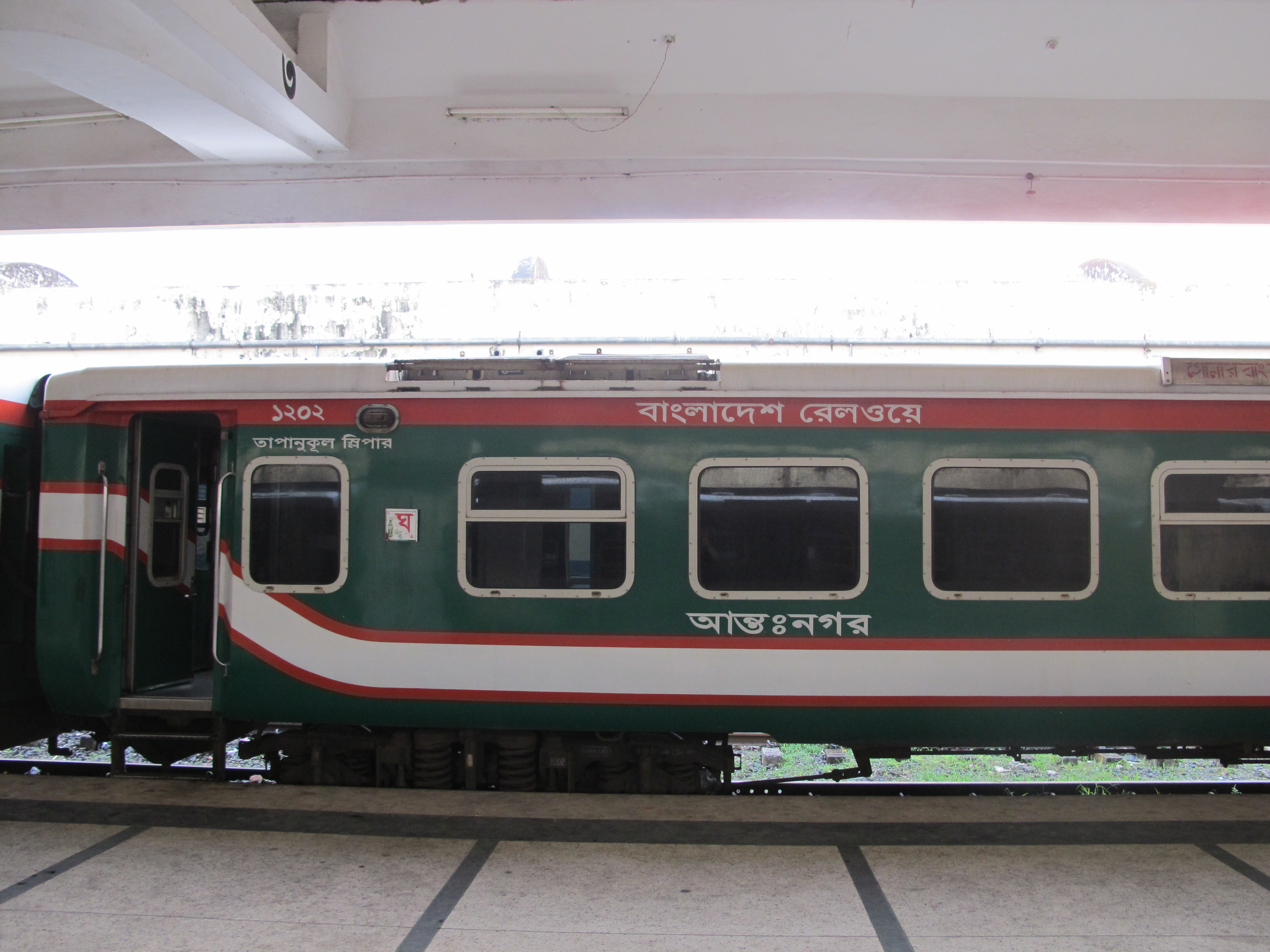
AC Sleeper coach of Sonar Bangla Express

Bangladesh Railway has three main passenger classes, "Air conditioned", "First" and "Second". Most trains do not provide the "Air conditioned" class. On inter-city and long-distance trains, a restaurant car and a power car are included at the centre of the train. All inter-city trains are partially air-conditioned, feature padded leather seats and provide passengers with on-demand sheets, pillows, blankets, as well as meals in a dining car. Some diesel–electric trains provides commuter services.

Class	Description
First Class AC (প্রথম শ্রেণী তাপানুকূল)	This is the most expensive class. This air-conditioned coach is used only on popular Inter-City routes. The coaches are carpeted, have sleeping accommodation, ample leg room and have privacy features like personal coupes.
First class (প্রথম শ্রেণী)	This class is relatively luxurious, but not air-conditioned; has sleeping berths, and ample leg room.
First class Chair (প্রথম শ্রেণী চেয়ার)	Chair car or day coach with a total of five seats in a row on broad gauge trains and four seats in a row on metre gauge trains, used for daily travel.
2nd Class-Shovon Chair (২য় শ্রেণী-শোভন চেয়ার)	The 2nd Class Shovon Chair is basically a chair car preferred by most middle-class passengers. Has a total of five seats in a row on broad gauge trains and four seats in a row on metre gauge trains.
2nd Class-Shovon (২য় শ্রেণী-শোভন)	One of the cheapest classes; These seats are the most uncomfortable.
2nd Class-Shulov (২য় শ্রেণী- সুলভ)	The cheapest accommodation, with seats made of pressed wood or steel and are cushioned. Only found in sub-urban and short-distance routes. Although entry into the compartment is guaranteed, a seat is not guaranteed. These coaches are usually very crowded.

== Railway stations ==
Kamalapur Railway Station is the central railway station in Dhaka. Other major stations are Khulna railway station, Sylhet railway station, Rajshahi railway station, Chattogram railway station. In 2015, Bangladesh Railway serviced 489 railway stations. These include one block hut, thirteen train halts, and four goods booking points. The schedule of Bangladesh Railway has changed 26 Trains in the new year 2020. The East zone Train schedule will active on 10 January 2020. There are 3 stations with international train services in Bangladesh; they are Dhaka Cantonment railway station, Darshana railway station,Chilahati railway station, Benapole railway station, Khulna railway station, and Jashore Junction railway station, All international trains arrive and depart from these stations.

== See also ==
- List of trains run by Bangladesh Railway
- Transport in Bangladesh
- Kalni Express
- Lalmoni Express
- Dhaka–Chittagong high-speed railway
- Bangladesh Railway Museum
- Bangladesh Railway S.A.
- Railway Nirapatta Bahini
