= Parabat Express =

Bangladesh Railway

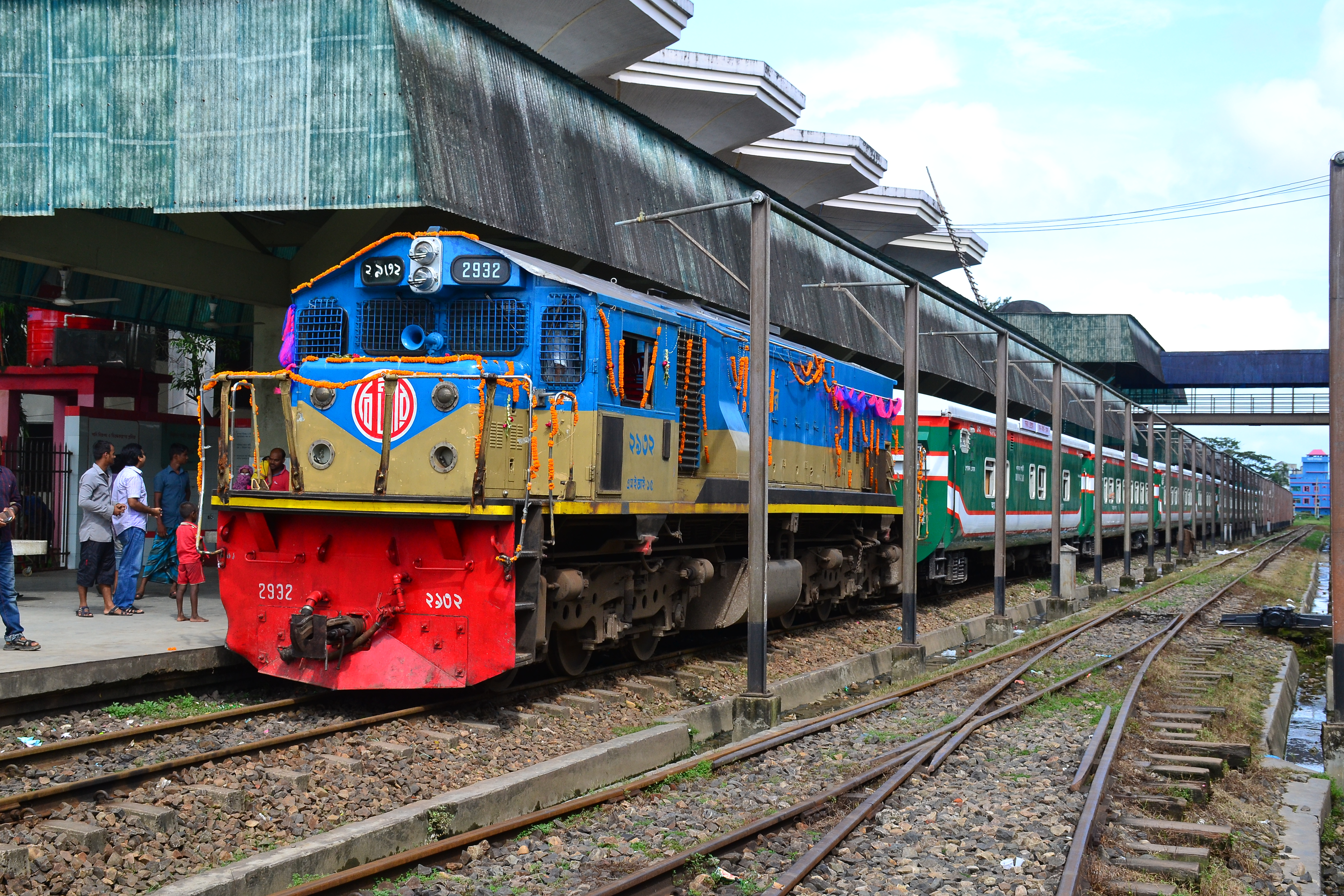
- Parabat Express at Sylhet Rail Station

Overview
- Status: Repairing
- Locale: Bangladesh
- First service: 19 March 1986
- Website: http://www.railway.gov.bd/

Route
- Stops: 10
- Average journey time: 6 hours & 45 minutes
- Service frequency: 6 days each week

On-board services
- Catering facilities: On-board

Technical
- Rolling stock: One 2900 Class locomotive; Eight Chair carriages; Two ac Chair carriages; Two ac Cabin carriages; One non-ac Cabin Carriages; One generator car; Two guard brake carriages with Buffet car

Parabat Express (Train no. 709/710) is an intercity train operating between Dhaka and Sylhet, two major cities in Bangladesh. Since the inception of intercity train service in Bangladesh in 1986, it has been regarded as one of the most prestigious and luxurious trains in the country.

== History ==
Parabat Express made its inaugural run on 19 March 1986, designated as Train No. 709 (up) / 710 (down). It was introduced as an intercity train offering a luxurious and fast service. Since its inauguration, the train has departed from Dhaka Railway Station. Parabat Express receives priority right-of-way on the Bangladesh Railway network. It has fewer stops than other Dhaka-Sylhet express trains, halting only at major stations.

== Schedule ==
The train runs between Dhaka and Sylhet, passing through districts such as Gazipur, Narsingdi, Kishoreganj, Brahmanbaria, Habiganj, and Maulavibazar. It departs from Kamalapur Railway Station at 06:20 AM (Bangladesh Standard Time) and arrives in Sylhet at 01:00 PM. On the return trip, it departs from Sylhet at 03:45 PM and arrives in Dhaka at 10:40 PM. The train operates every day of the week except Monday.

== Carriages ==
The train currently operates with 16 PT Inka (Industri Kereta Api) air-brake coaches, which were introduced on 2 September 2016. The train consists of eight chair cars, two AC chair cars, two non-AC chair cars, two guard brake cars with an attached dining car, one non-AC cabin, and one generator car. Before the introduction of the Inka coaches, the train used old vacuum brake coaches. However, between 1998 and 2011, the train operated with Iranian air-brake coaches. Due to maintenance issues, the Iranian air-brake coaches were replaced with vacuum brake coaches in 2011.

== Locomotive ==
Parabat Express is typically hauled by a Class 2900 locomotive of Bangladesh Railway. However, due to occasional rolling stock shortages, it may sometimes be hauled by a Class 2600 locomotive. An air-braked locomotive is mandatory for the train's operation.

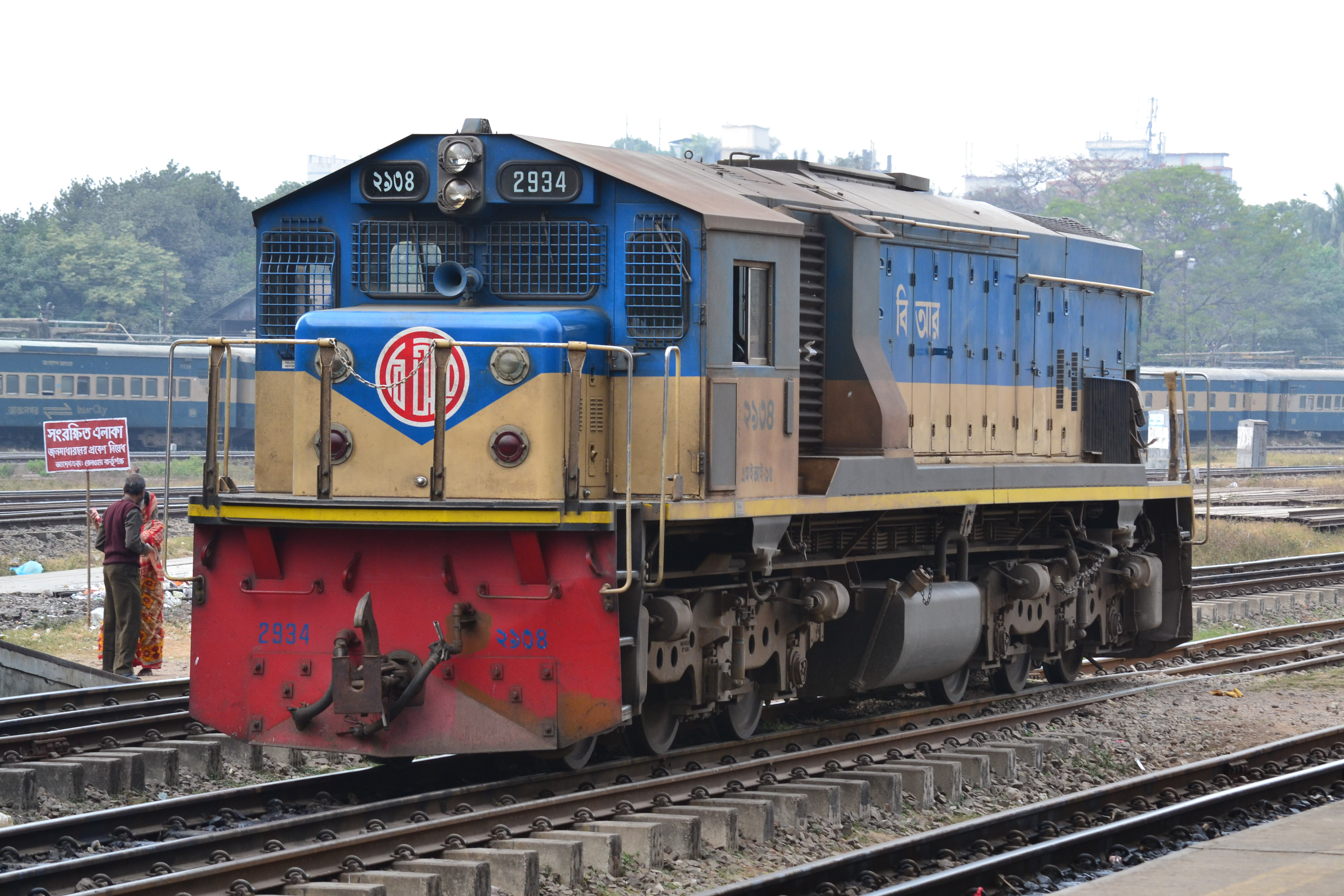
Class 2900 locomotive of Bangladesh Railway. This is locomotive no. 2934

== Stoppages ==
- Dhaka Bimanbandor
- Bhairabbazar
- Brahmanbaria
- Azampur
- Noapara
- Shaistaganj
- Sreemangal
- Bhanugach
- Kulaura
- Maizgaon

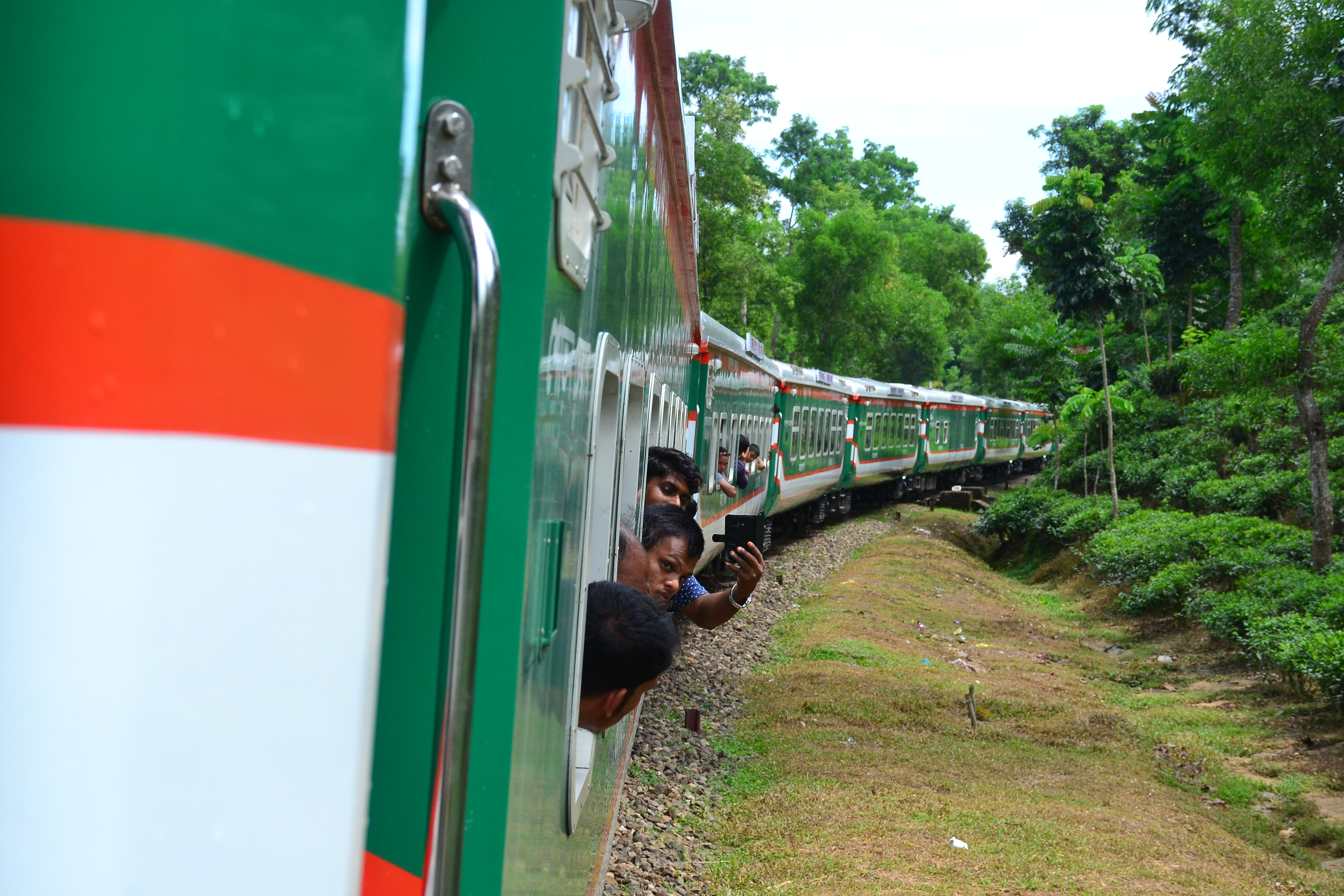
Parabat Express passing through a tea garden

== Accident of Locomotive no. 2933 ==
Locomotive No. 2933 was one of the newest locomotives in the Class 2900 series. It was involved in a fatal accident in Noyapara, Madhabpur Upazila, Habiganj District, on 7 October 2016. The locomotive caught fire shortly after it derailed with the Parabat Express near Noyapara Railway Station. The driver's cab and the electrical cabinet of the locomotive were destroyed in the fire, and the locomotive required extensive repairs.
