= Panchagarh Express =

Passenger train service in Bangladesh

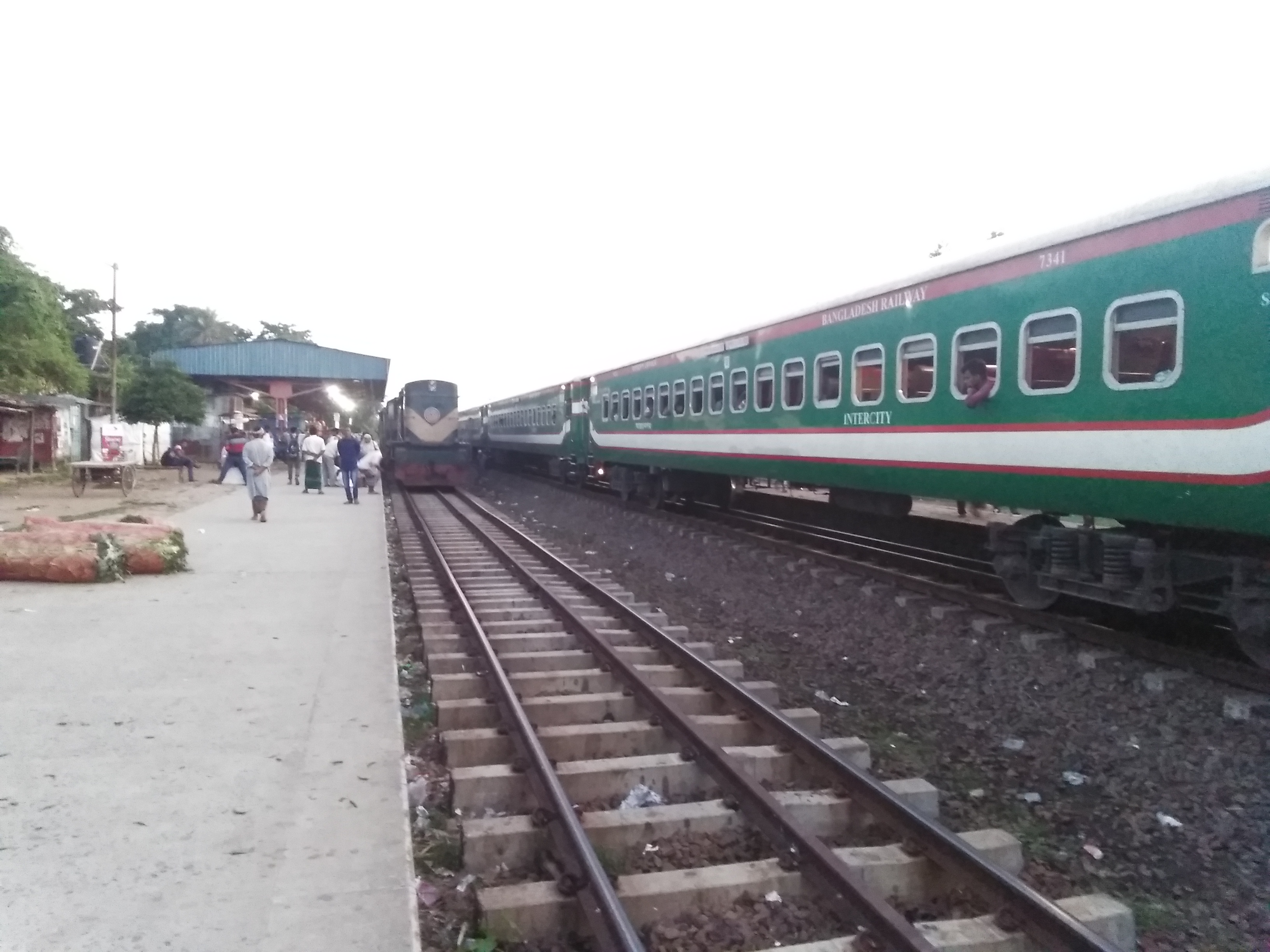

Overview
- Service type: Intercity train
- Current operator: Bangladesh Railway

Route
- Termini: Kamalapur railway station Panchagarh railway station
- Stops: 11 (including termini)
- Distance travelled: 526 km (327 mi)
- Average journey time: 10 hours
- Service frequency: Daily
- Train number: 793/794

On-board services
- Classes: AC, Non-AC, AC Berth, AC seat
- Seating arrangements: Yes
- Sleeping arrangements: Yes
- Catering facilities: Yes
- Baggage facilities: Yes

Technical
- Rolling stock: 14
- Track gauge: 1,676 mm (5 ft 6 in)
- Operating speed: 100 Km/hour (maximum)

The Panchagarh Express (Train no. 793-794) is a semi non-stop intercity train which runs between Dhaka and Panchagarh. The train is one of the prominent trains that connect the capital to northern Bangladesh.

== History ==
Prime Minister Sheikh Hasina inaugurated this service by video conference from Dhaka on 25 May 2019. The train service runs seven days a week.

== Schedule ==
Panchagarh Express begins its journey from Kamalapur railway station at 23:30. It departs Airport railway station, Dhaka at 23:58, Santahar at 04:30, Parbatipur at 06:25, Dinajpur at 07:03, Pirganj at 08:08, Thakurgaon Road at 08:36 and reaches the final destination Panchagarh railway station at 09:50.

The reverse journey starts from Panchagarh at 12:10 pm. On its return route, it stops at Thakurgaon, Dinajpur, Parbatipur and Dhaka Airport stations. The approximate times are 12:55, 14:20, 15:20 and 21:40 respectively.

== Coach composition ==
This named train has a total of 14 coaches with one AC cabin, 2 AC chairs, 9 Shovan chair cars, 2 Power Cars, Guard Break and pantry car.

=== Seat distribution ===
Total seats are 896 from Panchagarh and 871 from Dhaka where 30% seats are reserved for the Panchagarh, 25% for Thakurgaon and 30% and 15% for Dinajpur and Parbatipur respectively.

== Halts ==
The train stops at 11 stations. They are-

- Panchagarh railway station
- Thakurgaon Road railway station
- Pirganj
- Dinajpur railway station
- Parbatipur
- Joypurhat
- Santahar
- Natore railway station
- Ibrahimabad railway station
- Airport railway station, Dhaka
- Kamalapur railway station

== See also ==
- Benapole Express
- Drutajan Express
