= Rangpur Express =

Bangladesh express train

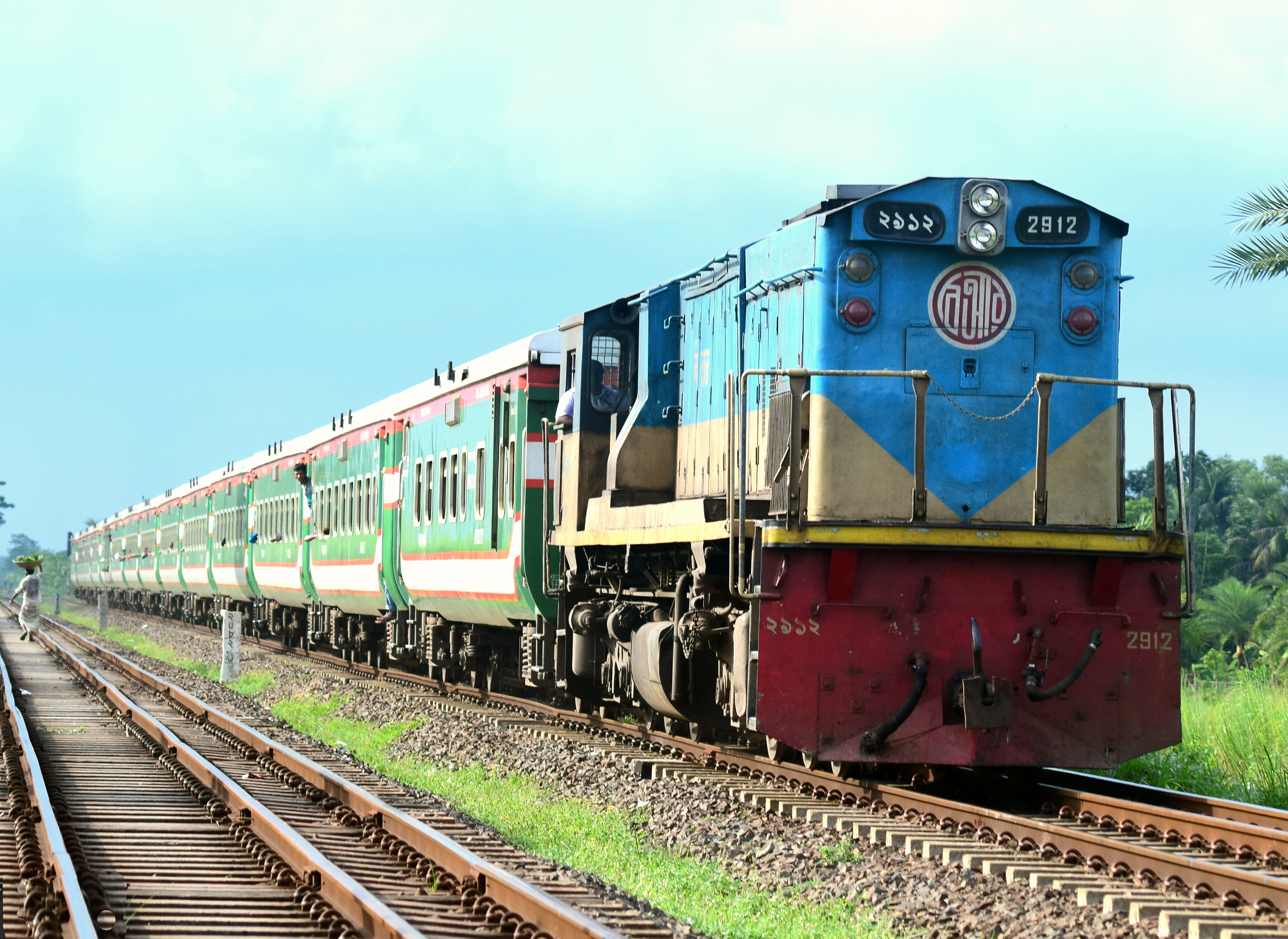
- Rangpur Express with 2912 locomotive

Overview
- Service type: Intercity train
- Current operator: Bangladesh Railway

Route
- Termini: Kamalapur railway station Rangpur railway station
- Distance travelled: 405 km
- Average journey time: 10 hrs
- Service frequency: Monday to Saturday (772); Tuesday to Sunday (771)
- Train number: 771 / 772

On-board services
- Classes: Sleeper, AC & Non-AC
- Seating arrangements: Yes
- Sleeping arrangements: Yes
- Catering facilities: Yes

Technical
- Rolling stock: 11
- Track gauge: 1,000 mm (3 ft 3 3/8 in)
- Operating speed: 80kmph

Rangpur Express (Train no. 771-772) is an intercity train in Bangladesh that runs between Rangpur and Dhaka under Bangladesh Railway. The train was launched in 2011. It is one of the fastest and most luxurious trains in Bangladesh. The train does not operate on Sundays (772) and Mondays (771).

The Rangpur Express (772) operates at night, departing from Rangpur at night and arriving in Dhaka in the morning. The Rangpur Express (771) operates in the daytime, departing from Dhaka in the morning and arriving in Rangpur in the evening.

== Train schedule ==
Departure from Rangpur: 20:00 • Arrival to Dhaka: 06:05 • Day off: Sunday

Departure from Dhaka: 09:00 • Arrival to Rangpur: 19:00 • Day off: Monday

== History ==
Rangpur Express was launched on 21 August 2011.

== Route and stops ==
- Rangpur
- Kaunia Junction
- Pirgachha
- Bamondanga
- Gaibandha
- Bonarpara
- Sonatola
- Bogra
- Talora
- Santahar Junction
- Natore
- Chatmohor
- Ibrahimabad
- Dhaka Airport
- Dhaka

== SMS tracking code ==
Real time train location can be tracked through this SMS

- TR 772 SEND to 16318
- TR 771 SEND to 16318

== See also ==
- Lalmoni Express
- Kurigram Express
- Burimari Express
- Panchagarh Express
- Drutojan Express
- Ekota Express
- Nilsagar Express
- Chilahati Express
