= Lalmoni Express =

Passenger train service in Bangladesh

Overview
- Status: Operating
- Locale: Bangladesh
- First service: October 16, 2019
- Website: www.railway.gov.bd

Route
- Stops: 16
- Average journey time: 10 hours & 15 minutes
- Service frequency: 6 days each week

On-board services
- Catering facilities: On board

Technical
- Rolling stock: One 3000 Class locomotive; Three chair carriages; Four Economy carriages; One AC Cabin carriages; One Non-Ac Cabin Carriages; One generator car; One buffet car; Two Guard brake

Lalmoni Express (Train no. 751/752) is an intercity train which runs between Dhaka (capital of Bangladesh) and Lalmonirhat District. Lalmoni Express has been considered one of the popular trains since its inception in 2004. The train connects several important cities, such as: Lalmonirhat, Gaibandha, Bogra, Natore with Dhaka. It is one of the long-distance travelling trains of Bangladesh alonging with Drutajan Express, Panchagarh Express, and Ekota Express.

== History ==
Lalmoni Express made its 1st inaugural run on 7 March 2004 with allocated train no. 751up/752down. It was introduced as only inter-city train between Lalmonirhat and Dhaka. It has frequent stops than other intercity trains in Bangladesh. However, Lalmonirhat Division of Bangladesh Railway gives top priority to this train for its passenger demand.

== Schedule ==
Lalmoni Express departs Lalmonirhat railway station at 09:45 (Bangladesh Standard Time) and arrives Dhaka station at 19:45. In return trip, it departs Dhaka at 21:45 and arrives Lalmonirhat at 07:30. Friday is the weekly holiday of this train. Due to its long distance of travelling, it faces schedule collapse sometimes.

== Carriages ==
The train currently runs with 14 vacuum brake Coaches. In spite of huge passenger demand, the train didn't get new coaches since its inception. Bangladesh Railway is thinking to upgrade its coaches in near future by introduction of air brake system.

== Locomotive ==
Lalmoni Express usually is hauled by a Class 2900 or a Class 3000 Locomotive of Bangladesh Railway. The train can be run with a vacuum brake locomotive.

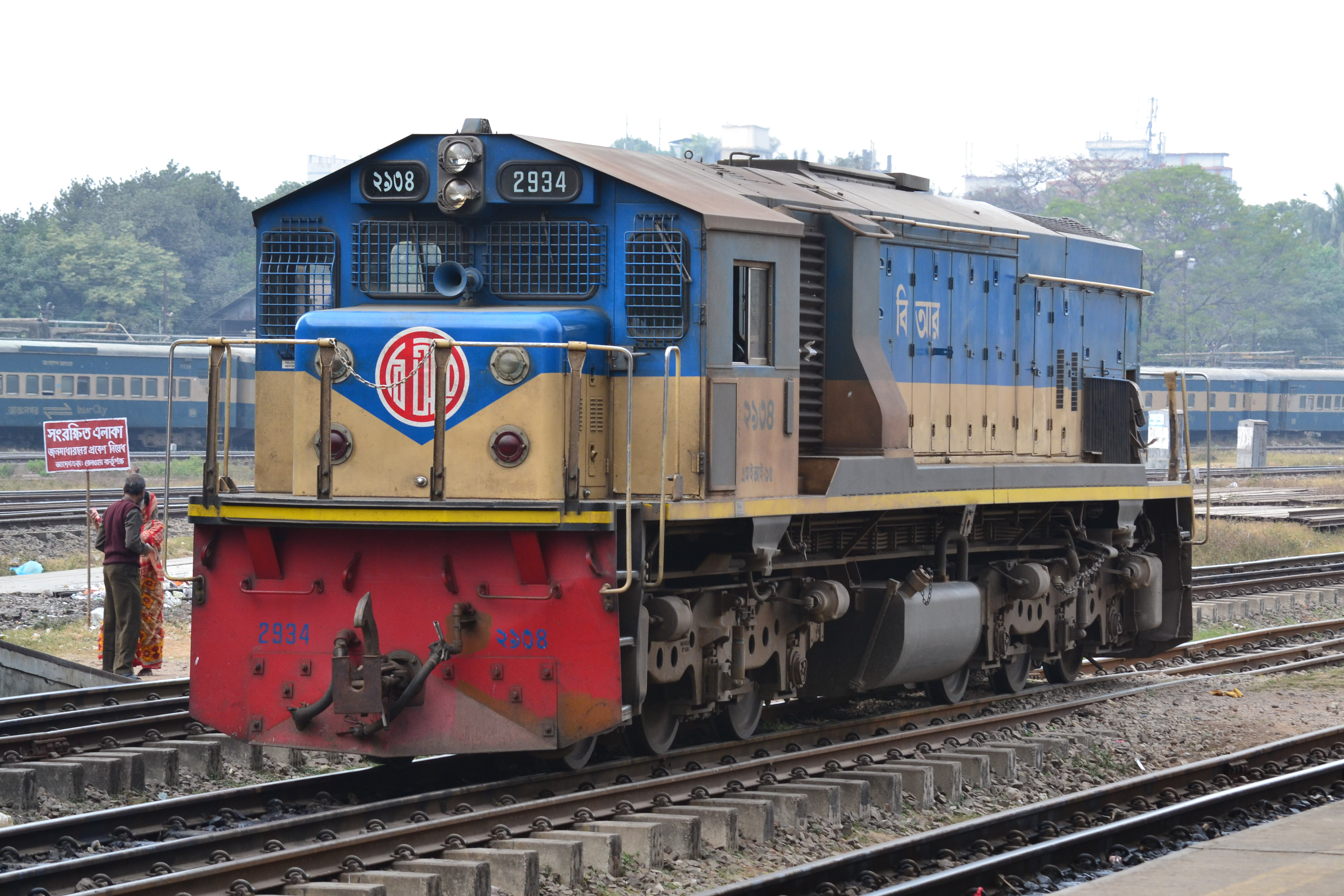
Class 2900 locomotive of Bangladesh Railway. This is locomotive no. 2934

== Stops ==
- Kamalapur Railway Station
- Dhaka Airport railway station
- Joydebpur
- Tangail
- Bangabandhu Bridge East
- Shaheed M Monsur Ali
- Ullapara
- Boralbridge
- Azimnagar station
- Natore
- Santahar
- Talora
- Bogura
- Sonatala
- Bonarpara
- Gaibandha
- Bamandanga
- Pirgachha
- Kaunia
- Tista
- Lalmonirhat Railway Station
