= Drutajan Express =

Inter-city train of Bangladesh Railway service

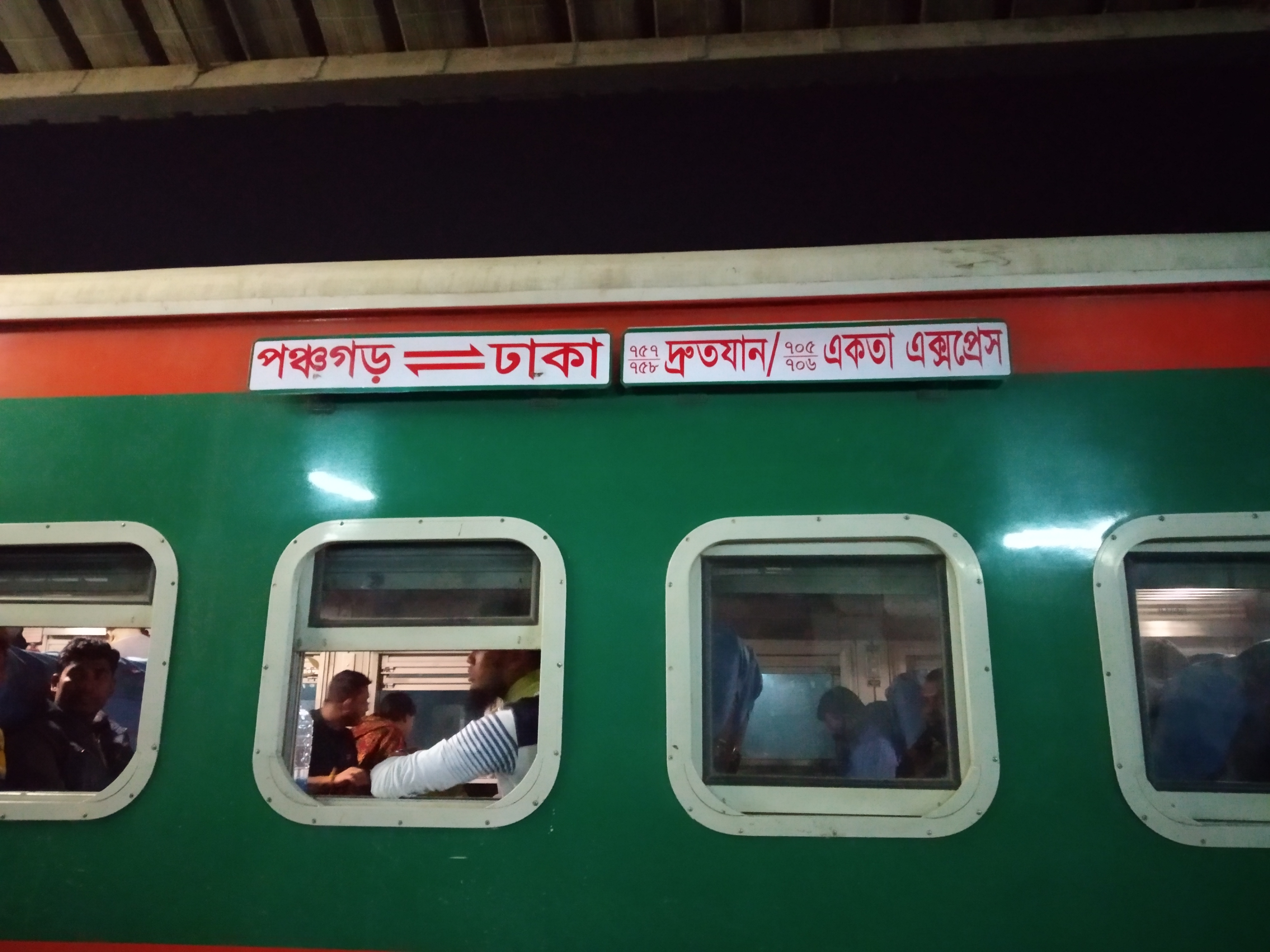
- Drutajan Express standing at Bimanbandar Station, Dhaka

Overview
- Service type: Inter-city Train
- First service: 27 August 1991; 34 years ago
- Current operator: Bangladesh Railway

Route
- Termini: Kamalapur Railway Station; Panchagarh Railway Station
- Distance travelled: 526 km (327 mi)
- Service frequency: Daily
- Train number: 757/758

On-board services
- Classes: AC, Non-AC, Chair, First Class Non AC
- Seating arrangements: Yes
- Sleeping arrangements: Yes
- Catering facilities: Yes

Technical
- Rolling stock: 12
- Track gauge: 1,676 mm (5 ft 6 in)

The Drutajan Express (Bengali: দ্রুতযান এক্সপ্রেস) is an inter-city train of Bangladesh Railway service. It gives service between the capital Dhaka and the northern Panchagarh District. At first it was operated from Dinajpur to Dhaka Cantonment Station, then extended to Panchagarh and Kamalapur. It is one of the fastest and luxury trains in Bangladesh.

== Schedule and stations ==
Drutajan express departs from Panchagarh railway station at 07:20 am and reaches Dhaka at 06:55 pm every day. It takes total 10 hours 40 minutes for a trip. The departure from Dhaka is at 08:45 pm and reaches Panchagarh at 07:10 am every day. The number of coach in the train is 13. The train stops at the following stations:

- Kamalapur Railway Station, Dhaka
- Dhaka Airport Railway Station
- Joydevpur
- Tangail
- Syedabad
- Ibrahimabad
- Chatmohor
- Ishwardi Bypass
- Natore
- Ahsanganj
- Santaher
- Akkelpur
- Joypurhat
- Panchbibi
- Birampur
- Phulbari
- Parbatipur
- Dinajpur
- Thakurgaon
- Panchagarh

== See also ==
- Maitree Express
- Samjhauta Express
- Lalmoni Express
