= Kurigram Express =

Intercity train in Bangladesh

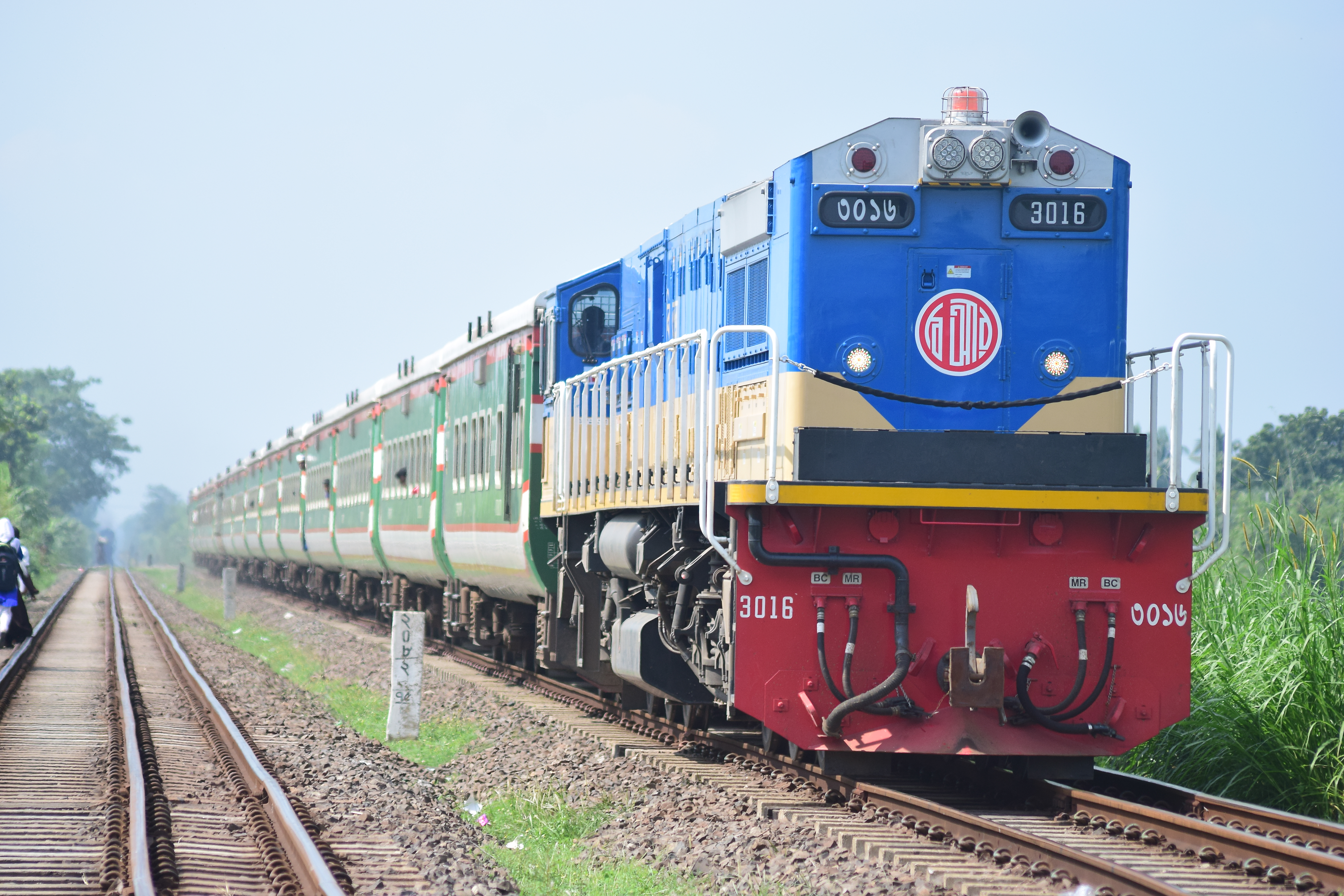

Overview
- Service type: Inter-city Train
- First service: 16 October 2019
- Current operator: Bangladesh Railway

Route
- Termini: Kurigram Railway Station; Kamalapur Railway Station
- Stops: 9
- Distance travelled: 405 kilometres (252 miles)
- Average journey time: 10 hours
- Service frequency: 6 days (Tuesday off)
- Train number: 797-798

On-board services
- Classes: AC, Non-AC, Shovan, Shulav
- Seating arrangements: Yes
- Sleeping arrangements: Yes
- Catering facilities: Yes

Technical
- Rolling stock: 11
- Track gauge: Metregage

Kurigram Express (Train no. 797-798) is a non-stop intercity train that runs between Dhaka (capital of Bangladesh) and the northern Kurigram District. This train provides a more effective connection between the capital and northern Bengal.

== History ==
On October 16, 2019, prime minister Sheikh Hasina inaugurated this train service by video conference. This named train service is running with the cars imported from Indonesia. The coaches are originately PT INKA rolling stock.

== Locomotives and seats ==
The train has 14 coaches in addition to a locomotive.

== Schedule ==
Kurigram Express begins its journey from Kurigram at 7:10 am and it reaches Dhaka at 5:05 pm. On the return trip, it leaves Dhaka at 8:00 pm and reaches Kurigram at 5:10 am. Tuesday is the weekly holiday for this train.

== Stops ==
The train makes stops at the following 9 stations:

- Kurigram railway station
- Rangpur railway station
- Badargang railway station
- Parbatipur railway station
- Joypurhat railway station
- Santahar railway station
- Madhnagar railway station
- Natore railway station
- Airport railway station, Dhaka
- Kamalapur railway station
