= Dinajpur (disambiguation) =

Dinajpur is a city in Dinajpur District, Bangladesh.

Dinajpur may also refer to:

== Bangladesh ==
- Dinajpur District, Bangladesh
  - Dinajpur Sadar Upazila, eponymous upazila of Dinajpur District
    - Dinajpur Medical College , a college in Bangladesh
    - Dinajpur railway station, a railway station in Dinajpur city
    - Dinajpur Education Board, education board for Rangpur Division

== India ==
- West Dinajpur district, a former district of West Bengal, India
  - North Dinajpur, a current district formed out of West Dinajpur
  - South Dinajpur, a current district formed out of West Dinajpur

== See also ==
- Dinajpur District (disambiguation)
