= Dinajpur District =

Dinajpur District may refer to:

- Dinajpur District, Bangladesh
- West Dinajpur district, West Bengal, India. It was split in 1992 into:
  - Dakshin Dinajpur district
  - Uttar Dinajpur district

== See also ==
- Dinajpur (disambiguation)
