= Thakurgaon Road railway station =

Railway station in Bangladesh

Thakurgaon Road railway station ঠাকুরগাঁও রোড রেলওয়ে স্টেশন

General information
- Location: Thakurgaon, Rangpur; Bangladesh
- Coordinates: 26.0391632°N 88.4267702°E
- Line: Parbatipur–Panchagarh line
- Platforms: 3
- Tracks: 4

Construction
- Structure type: Standard (on ground station)

Other information
- Status: Functioning
- Station code: TKR
- Fare zone: West Zone

History
- Opened: 1930; 96 years ago
- Former names: North Bengal Railway

Services
Preceding station	Bangladesh Railway	Following station
Akhanagar	Line; Parbatipur-Panchagarh line	Shibganj
Route map
Location

Thakurgaon Road railway station is a railway serving Thakurgaon. It was built in 1930s. It is 5 km away Thakurgaon town.

== History ==
In 1930, North Bengal Railway Company built Dinajpur to Ruhia line. This station is built under that line.
