= Coaches and wagons of Bangladesh =

Railway cars in Bangladesh

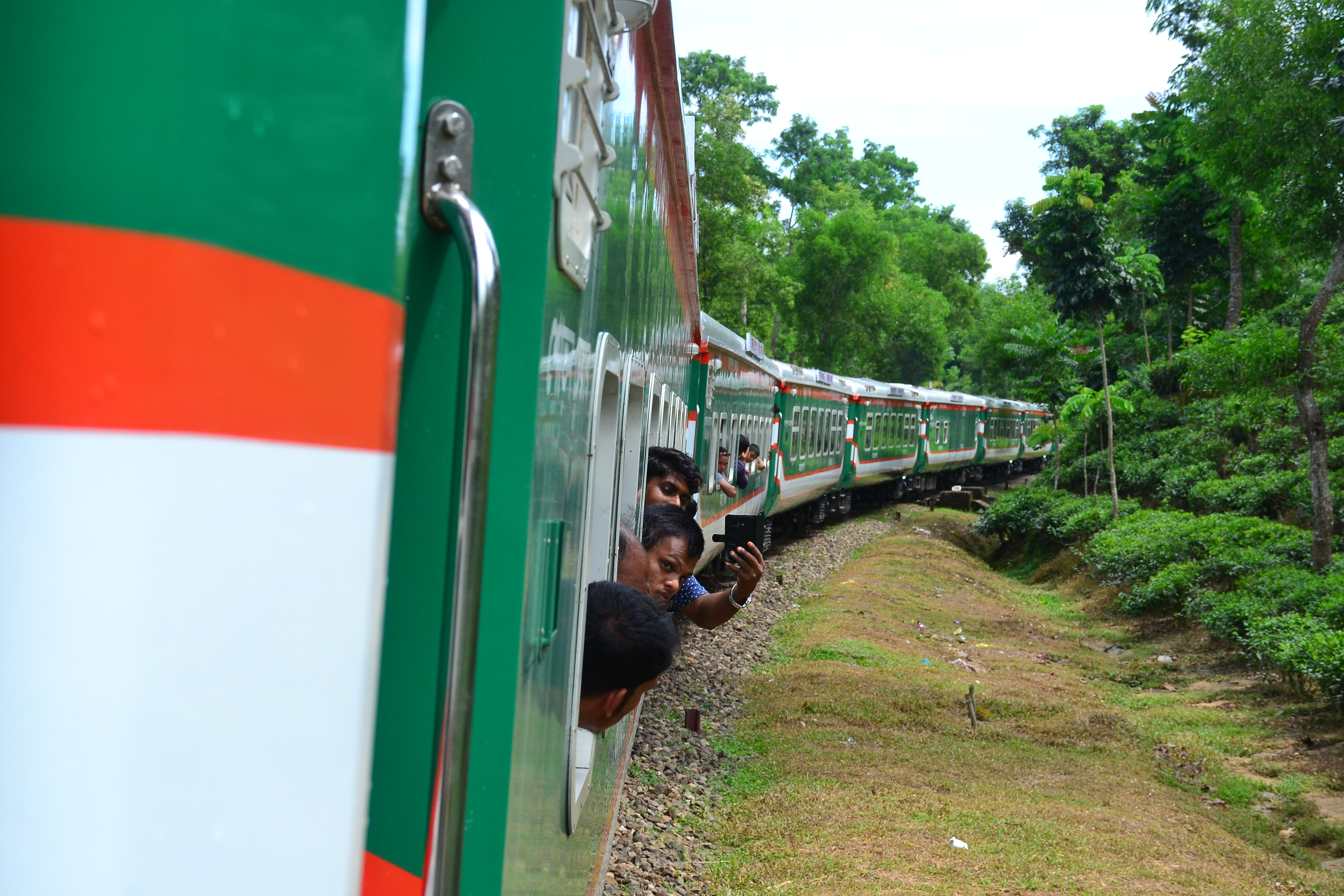
Coaches of Parabat Express

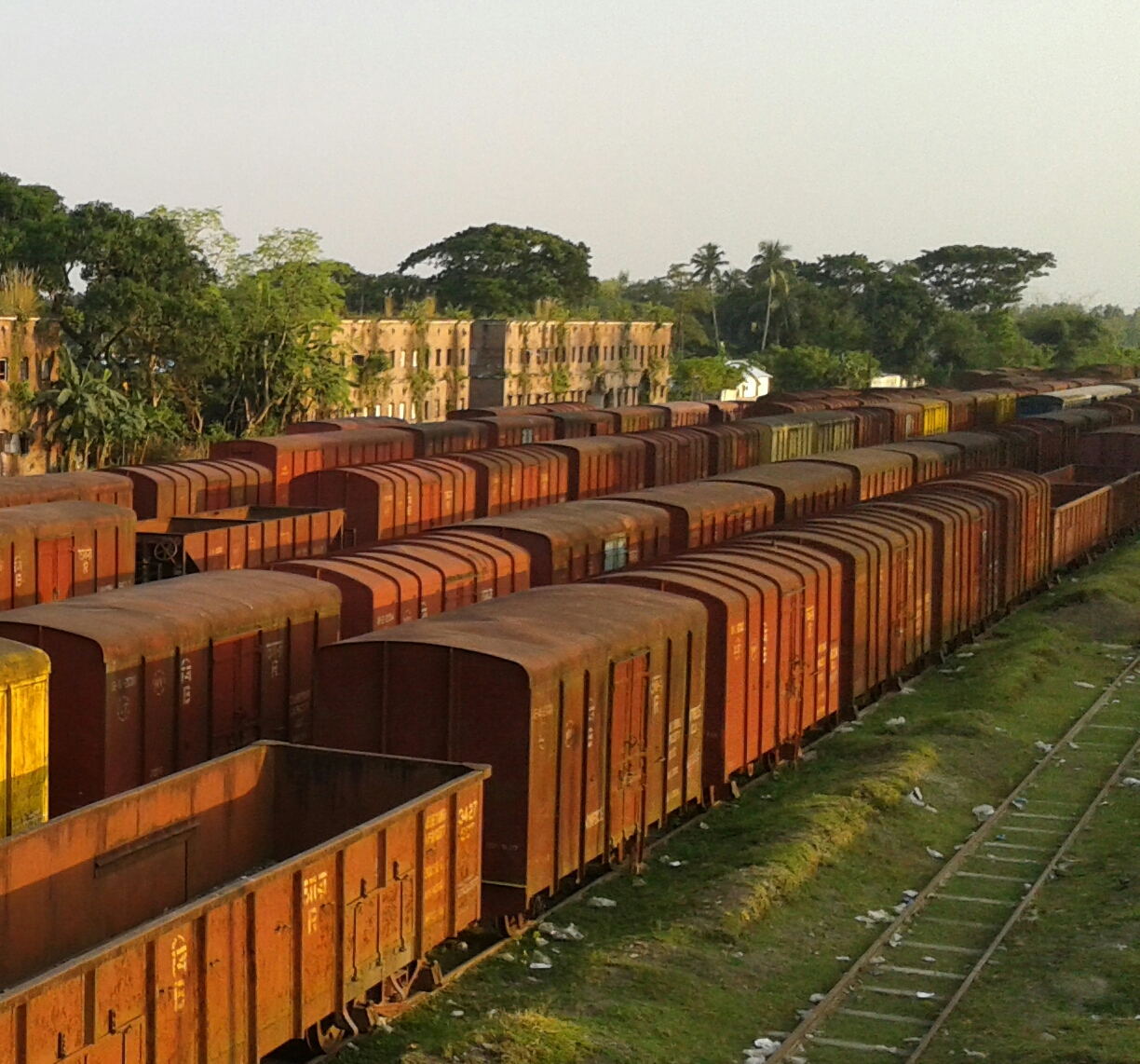
Wagons in Lalmonirhat Railway Station

Coaches and wagons of Bangladesh are rail vehicles operated and maintained by Bangladesh Railway. At the end of the year 2004–2005, Bangladesh Railway had a total of 1,406 coaches. Among them, 1,344 were for conveyance of passengers and 62 were for luggage, mails, parcels and departmental uses. Bangladesh Railway also had 10,236 wagons among which, 7,310 are covered, 1,115 are open and 1,811 are specialized types.

== Coaches ==
Bangladesh Railway has imported passenger coaches from various countries over time, manufacturing some locally.

=== Iran ===
During 1998, 67 meter-gauge coaches were added to the fleet. They were manufactured by Wagon Pars. The underframe or bogie used German technology. In 2017, an initiative to rehabilitate some of these coaches began at Saidpur railway workshop. The reconstructed coaches feature comfortable seats, stainless steel instead of mild steel in the floor, floor mat, modern lights, alarm chain pulling controller, modern commode, cellphone and laptop charging system, and air brake, with some broad gauge vacuum coaches imported.

=== China ===
In 2007, CRRC of China supplied white air braked meter-gauge coaches to Bangladesh. In November 2020, a contract was awarded to CRRC to supply 200 broad gauge coaches. The purchase was scheduled to be completed by June 30, 2020.

=== Indonesia ===
In 2006, a contract was made with PT INKA for 50 broad-gauge coaches. In March 2020, a contract was awarded to PT INKA to supply 100 meter-gauge and 50 broad-gauge coaches. It was planned to import 100 more meter-gauge coaches later. In 2016, some broad gauge and meter gauge coaches of PT INKA were imported as well.

=== India ===
On 2016, a contract was made with RITES Ltd to supply 120 broad-gauge LHB coaches along with 36 broad gauge and 10 metre gauge locomotives. The order included 17 AC Sleepers, 17 AC Chairs cars, 34 non-AC Chair cars with pantry, 33 non-AC Chair cars with prayer room and 19 power car coaches. These coaches are made with stainless steel, have fiat bogies and are capable of running at 160 km/h speed. The first 60 coaches were delivered by June 30 the same year. The coaches were manufactured by Rail Coach Factory, Kapurthala and locomotives were manufactured by Banaras Locomotive Works.

On 20 May 2024, another contract, worth $111.26 million, was signed with RITES Ltd to supply 200 broad-gauge coaches. This signing was done after a global scale competitive bidding procedure. Of these, 104 coaches will be air-conditioned and 96 will be non-AC. Rail Coach Factory, Kapurthala will manufacture these coaches. RITES will also provide design expertise, spare parts support, and training. The delivery and commissioning of the coaches will be completed within 36 months of signing the deal and followed by 24 months of warranty.

== Wagons ==
=== China ===
A joint venture of China National Technical Import and Export Corp, Jiangsu Railteco Equipment Co and Jinxi Railway Vehicle Co has been awarded a contract to supply 50 broad gauge and 75 metre gauge vans. All of vehicles were to be commissioned within 27 months.
