= Parbatipur Junction railway station =

Railway station in Parbatipur Upazila, Bangladesh

Parbatipur Junction পার্বতীপুর জংশন
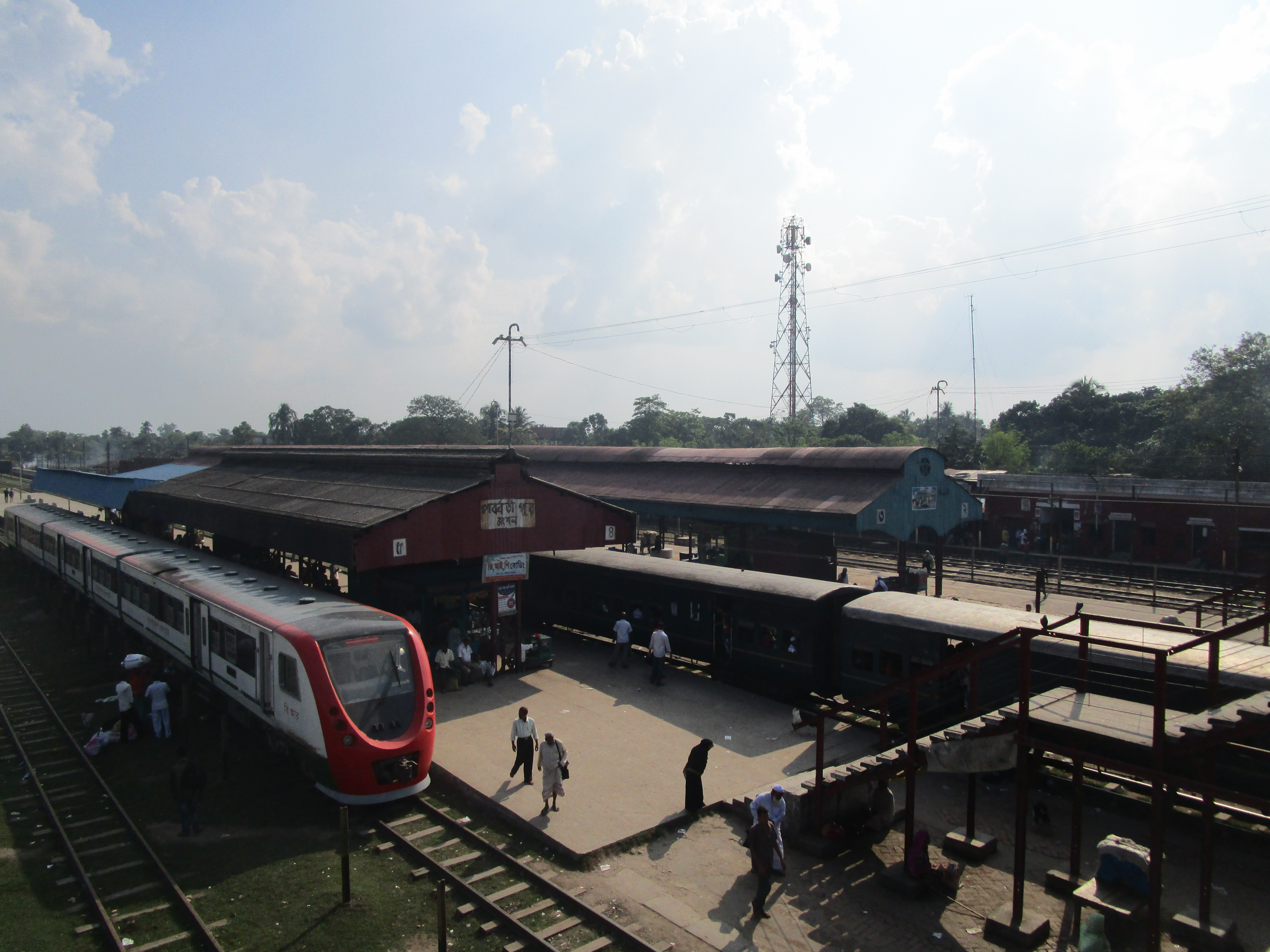
- Parbatipur Junction railway station

General information
- Location: Station Road, Parbatipur, Dinajpur District; Bangladesh
- Coordinates: 25°39′13″N 88°54′56″E
- Owner: Bangladesh Railway
- Lines: Chilahati–Parbatipur–Santahar–Darshana line; Burimari–Lalmonirhat–Parbatipur line; Parbatipur–Panchagarh line
- Platforms: 5
- Tracks: 20

Construction
- Parking: Yes
- Cycle facilities: Yes
- Accessible: Yes

Other information
- Station code: PBT

History
- Opened: 1878

Services
Preceding station	Bangladesh Railway	Following station
Balaichandi	Line; Chilahati-Parbatipur-Santahar-Darshana Line	Bhabanipur
Terminus	Line; Burimari–Lalmonirhat–Parbatipur line	Kolahati
Terminus	Line; Parbatipur–Panchagarh line	Kharkhoria
Location

Parbatipur Junction railway station (Bengali: পার্বতীপুর জাংশন রেলওয়ে স্টেশন) is a railway junction in Dinajpur district of Rangpur Division in Bangladesh.

== History ==
During the British period all railway connections to Assam and North Bengal were through the eastern part of Bengal. From 1878, the railway route from Kolkata, then called Calcutta, to Siliguri was in two laps. The first lap was a 185 km journey along the Eastern Bengal State Railway from Calcutta Station (later renamed Sealdah) to Damookdeah Ghat on the southern bank of the Padma River, then across the river in a ferry and the second lap of the train journey, which was a 336 km metre gauge line of the North Bengal Railway that linked Saraghat on the northern bank of the Padma to Siliguri.

The 1.8 km long Hardinge Bridge across the Padma came up in 1912. In 1926 the metre-gauge section north of the bridge was converted to broad gauge, and so the entire Calcutta-Siliguri route became broad-gauge. Parbatipur came up as a station on the Calcutta-Siliguri route.

Once Parbatipur came up as a railway station on the Chilahati-Parbatipur-Santahar-Darshana Line in 1876, it became a centre of further railway development. There were two developments, one eastward and the other westward. North Bengal State Railway opened a metre gauge line to Kaunia in 1879. Two narrow gauge lines were laid by Eastern Bengal Railway from Kaunia to Dharla River. The Kaunia Dharla railway lines were converted to metre gauge in 1901. The Kaunia-Dharla line was extended to Amingaon in 1908. The Assam Behar State Railway started building westward in 1884 and by 1889, Parbatipur was connected with Katihar in Bihar.

With the partition of India, railway links outside Bangladesh were lost but Parbatipur continued to be an important railway junction.
