= Ekota Express =

Named passenger train of Bangladesh

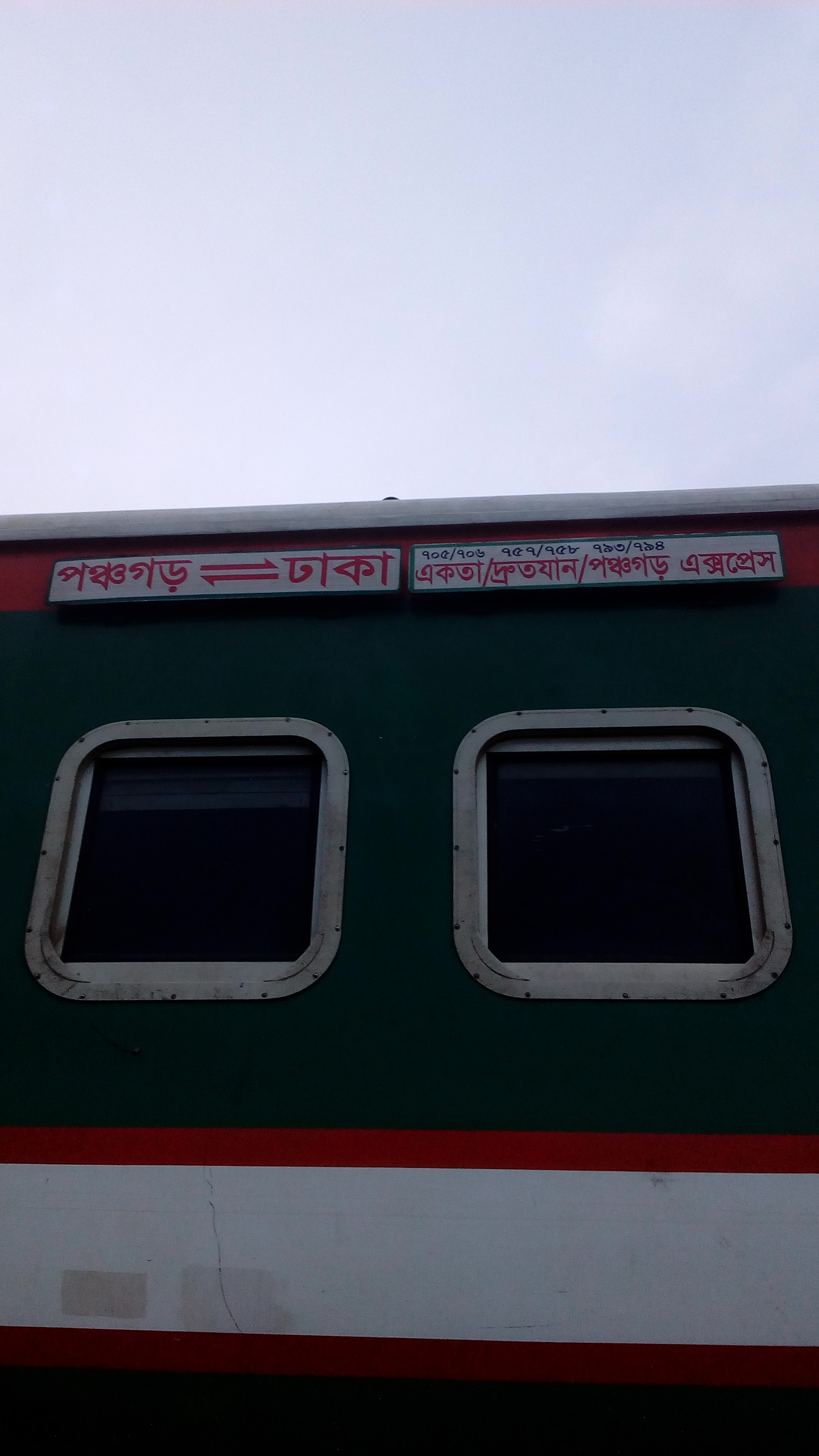

Overview
- Service type: Inter-city named passenger train
- Status: Operating
- Current operator: Bangladesh Railway

Route
- Termini: Kamalapur railway station Panchagarh Railway Station
- Distance travelled: 526 or 526 km (327 mi)
- Train number: 705–706
- Lines used: Narayanganj–Bahadurabad Ghat; Jamtail–Joydebpur railway; Chilahati–Parbatipur–Santahar–Darshana; Parbatipur–Dinajpur–Panchagarh

Technical
- Track gauge: Broad-gauge

Ekota Express (Bengali: একতা এক্সপ্রেস) is a named inter-city passenger train of Bangladesh. It runs between Kamalapur railway station of Dhaka District and Bir Muktijoddha Sirajul Islam railway station, which is now called "Panchagarh Railway Station" of Panchagarh District.

== Rolling stock ==
On 2 September 2016, Ekota Express along with Drutojan Express were converted from meter-gauge to broad-gauge. Ekota Express has a load of 13/26 and can hold up to 1,200 passengers.

On 16 December 2016, railway coaches of Ekota Express along with Drutojan Express were changed with newer ones imported from Indonesia.

On 11 November 2018, the route of Ekota and Drutojan Express were extended from Dhaka–Dinajpur to Dhaka–Panchagarh. As a result, the shuttle train service between Dinajpur and Panchagarh was closed. According to new Ekota Express Train Schedule, the train leaves Dhaka at 10:15 Am and reach Panchagarh at 09:00 PM. It takes total 10:45.It departs from Panchagarh at 09:10 pm BST, and arrives at Dhaka at 07:20 am BST. It takes total 10:10.
