= Dinajpur railway station =

Railway station in Dinajpur, Bangladesh

Dinajpur দিনাজপুর
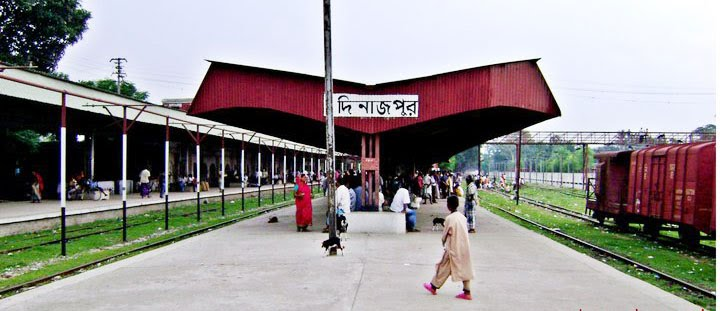
- Dinajpur railway station

General information
- Location: Dinajpur, Rangpur; Bangladesh
- Coordinates: 25.6251°N 88.6328°E
- Line: Parbatipur–Panchagarh line
- Platforms: 3
- Tracks: 4

Construction
- Structure type: Standard (on ground station)

Other information
- Status: Functioning
- Station code: DGP
- Fare zone: West Zone

History
- Opened: 1884; 142 years ago
- Former names: North Bengal Railway

Services
Preceding station	Bangladesh Railway	Following station
Kanchan Junction	Line; Parbatipur-Panchagarh line	Kaugaon
Route map
Location

Dinajpur Railway station is a railway station in Dinajpur. It was established in 1884. It mainly serves Dinajpur city in Dinajpur District.

== History ==
The station was established as a metre gauge station, but in 2014 the station was converted to a dual gauge station.
