= Rangpur railway station =

Railway station in Rangpur District, Bangladesh

Rangpur রংপুর

General information
- Location: Rangpur, Rangpur Division; Bangladesh
- Coordinates: 25°26′03″N 89°09′18″E
- Line: Burimari–Lalmonirhat–Parbatipur line
- Platforms: 3

Construction
- Structure type: Standard (on ground station)
- Parking: Yes
- Cycle facilities: Yes
- Accessible: Yes

Other information
- Status: Functioning
- Station code: RNP
- Zone(s): West Zone
- Division(s): Lalmonirhat

History
- Opened: July 2, 1878; 148 years ago
- Former names: North Bengal Railway

Services
Preceding station	Bangladesh Railway	Following station
Shyampur	Line; Burimari–Lalmonirhat–Parbatipur line	Mirbag
Route map
Location

Rangpur Railway Station (Bengali: রংপুর রেলওয়ে স্টেশন) is a railway station located in Rangpur district of Rangpur division of Bangladesh. Rangpur station was established on 2 July 1878 as the first district headquarters of Rangpur district in Bangladesh. A total of 6 lines with a single platform, a small island platform, a main line, two loop lines and 3 yard lines. In 1944, major renovations were done at Rangpur station. After that, no major renovations were seen at Rangpur station.

== History ==
In order to connect British trade and commerce with Kolkata, initiatives were taken to expand railways in various thanas of Rangpur. In view of that, in the first phase, in 1878, the railway was started simultaneously from Poradah in the then Nadia district to Rangpur city and Jalpaiguri, which was newly separated from Rangpur.

The British were so interested in doing business in Rangpur that the area around Rangpur station was named Robertsonganj after a British businessman Robert Watson.

In 1870, the British government asked the Tajhat zamindar of Rangpur district for land to build a railway factory in Rangpur. The zamindar agreed to donate the land of Saidpur village of Darwani Thana instead of giving it to Rangpur town. Later, the British government gave him the opportunity to travel the whole of India free of charge in a saloon coach as an honor and he enjoyed this privilege for life.

Later the British government established a railway junction at Lalmonirhat village in Barabari police station of Rangpur district and established a direct railway line with Rangpur to Assam. Teesta Railway Bridge was built in 1901 at Kaunia in Mahiganj police station of Rangpur district. In 1905, the railway started from Bonarpara in Saghata police station of Rangpur district to Kaunia in Mahiganj police station.
