= Kaunia Upazila =

Kaunia কাউনিয়া
- Upazila
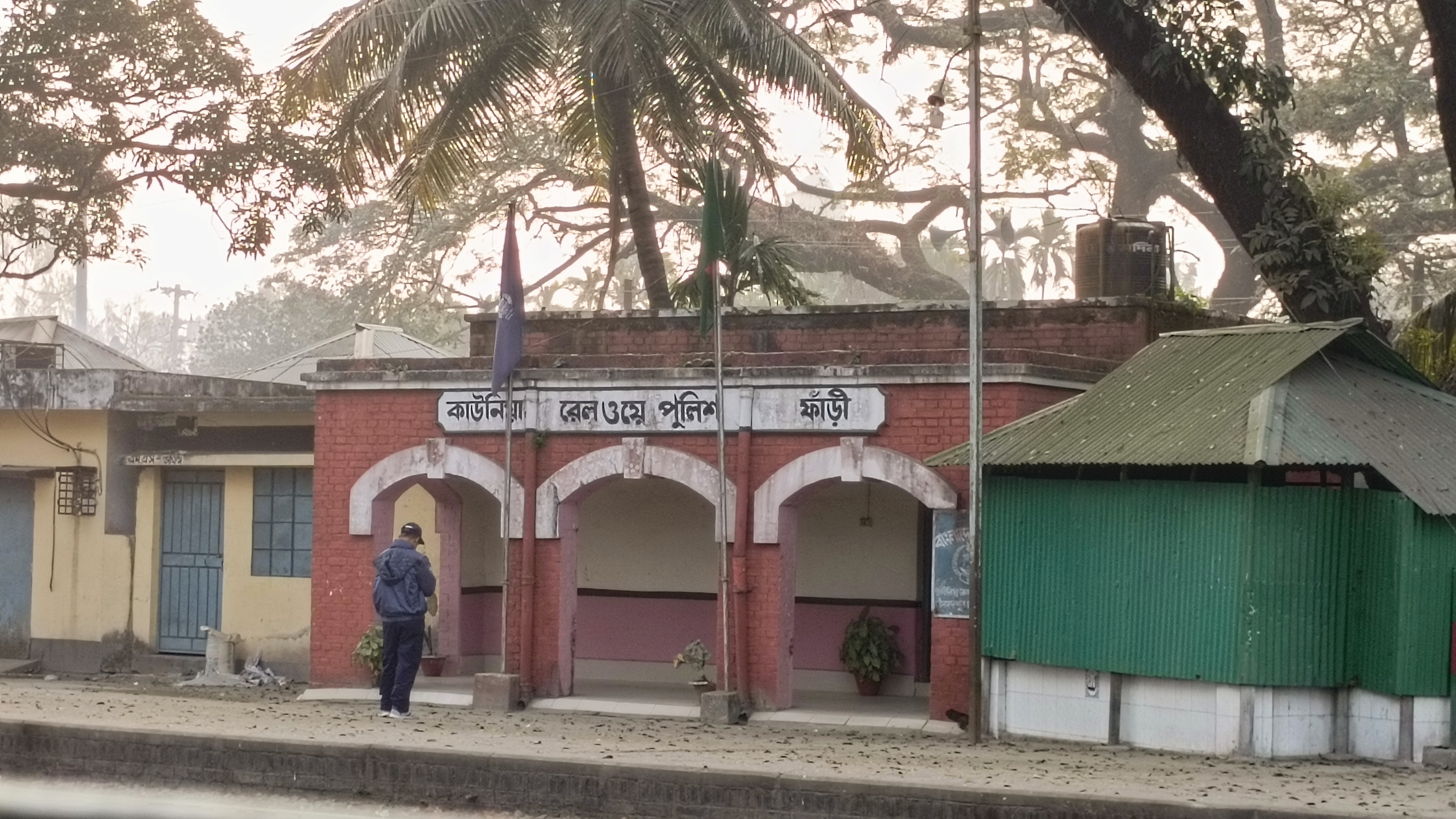
- Kaunia Railway Police Outpost

- Coordinates: 25°46.2′N 89°25′E
- Country: Bangladesh
- Division: Rangpur
- District: Rangpur

Area
  - Upazila: 147.65 km^{2} (57.01 sq mi)
  - Urban: 16.13 km^{2} (6.23 sq mi)

Population (2022)
  - Upazila: 239,689
  - Density: 1,623.4/km^{2} (4,204.5/sq mi)
  - Urban: 61,425
  - Urban density: 3,808/km^{2} (9,863/sq mi)
- Time zone: UTC+6 (BST)
- Postal code: 5440
- Website: Official Map of Kaunia

Kaunia Upazila mauza geocode map

Kaunia (Bengali: কাউনিয়া) is an upazila of Rangpur District in the Division of Rangpur, Bangladesh.

== Geography ==
Kaunia is located at 25.7708°N 89.4167°E. It has 56,263 households and total area 147.65 km^{2}. Teesta river flows beside this upazila.

Kaunia Upazila (Rangpur District) with an area of 147.65 km^{2}, is bounded by Gangachara and Lalmonirhat Sadar upazilas on the north, Pirgachha Upazila on the south, Rajarhat upazila on the east, and Rangpur Sadar Upazila on the west. Main rivers are Teesta, Burail.

== Demographics ==
Religions in Kaunia Upazila (2022)
Religion	Percent
Islam	93.18%
Hinduism	6.80%
Other or not stated	0.02%

According to the 2022 Bangladeshi census, Kaunia Upazila had 63,121 households and a population of 239,689. 9.65% of the population were under 5 years of age. Kaunia had a literacy rate (age 7 and over) of 68.07%: 71.60% for males and 64.78% for females, and a sex ratio of 94.54 males for every 100 females. 77,780 (32.45%) lived in urban areas.

According to the 2011 Census of Bangladesh, Kaunia Upazila had 56,263 households and a population of 227,805. 51,862 (22.77%) were under 10 years of age. Kaunia had a literacy rate (age 7 and over) of 41.88%, compared to the national average of 51.8%, and a sex ratio of 1021 females per 1000 males. 61,425 (26.96%) lived in urban areas.

As of the 1991 Bangladesh census, Kaunia has a population of 184,997. Males constitute 51.26% of the population, and females 48.74%. This Upazila's eighteen up population is 88,987. 52.5% male and 47.5% female. Kaunia has an average literacy rate of 22.7% (7+ years), and the national average of 32.4% literate.

== Economy ==
Agriculture is the main economical root of maximum people of this Upazila.

== Administration ==
UNO: Md. Mohidul Haque.

Kaunia Upazila is divided into Haragach Municipality and six union parishads: Kaunia Balapara, Haragach, Kursha, Sarai, Shahidbag, and Tepamodhupur. The union parishads are subdivided into 80 mauzas and 78 villages.

Hargach Municipality consists of 9 wards. It has an area of 16.13 km^{2}. The town has a population of 61425 with a sex ratio of 1038 females per 1000 males. The density of population is 3808 per km^{2}.

== Education ==
The people of Kaunia are developed in educational sector. About 90% people are educated. There are many educational institutions. Such as:

- Kaunia M.H. Government Model High School
- Kaunia Girls High School
- Kaunia College
- Kaunia Mohila College
- Nijpara Ahammadia Senior Madrasah
- Sabdi darus sunnah alim Madrasah
- Daradi High School

== See also ==
- Upazilas of Bangladesh
- Districts of Bangladesh
- Divisions of Bangladesh
