= Parbatipur–Panchagarh line =

Parbatipur- Panchagarh line

Overview
- Status: Operational
- Owner: Bangladesh Railway
- Locale: Bangladesh
- Termini: Parbatipur; Panchagarh railway station
- Stations: 20

History
- Opened: Parbatipur-Ruhia 1913; Ruhia - Panchagarh 1967

Technical
- Line length: 150 kilometres (93 mi)
- Track gauge: Dual gauge

Parbatipur- Panchagarh Line is a 150 km long railway line in Rangpur division. It was opened by Pakistan Eastern Railway in 1967. The line has 20 station and 5 station in planning.

== History ==
In 1913, Bengal Dooars Railway built the Parbatipur-Ruhia meter-gauge line. Parbatipur-Ruhia during British period and Ruhia-Panchgarh railway line was constructed in 1967 during Pakistani period. Since then, due to non-renovation, the train movement is about to be stopped. In 2013, Prime Minister Sheikh Hasina inaugurated the modern rail link from Panchagarh to Parbatipur in a public meeting at the Panchagarh sugar mill grounds. As part of the development of the government, the 150 km railway line from Panchagarh - Thakurgaon - Dinajpur - Parvatipur was converted into dual gauge at a cost of 982 crores. Development work was completed in 2016 under Bangladesh Railway Western Region.

In 2018 Ministry of Railways convert the route into dual gauge line.

At present, the work of extending the railway line from Panchagarh railway station to Banglabandha is going on

== Panchagarh railway station ==
Panchagarh railway station পঞ্চগড় রেলওয়ে স্টেশন
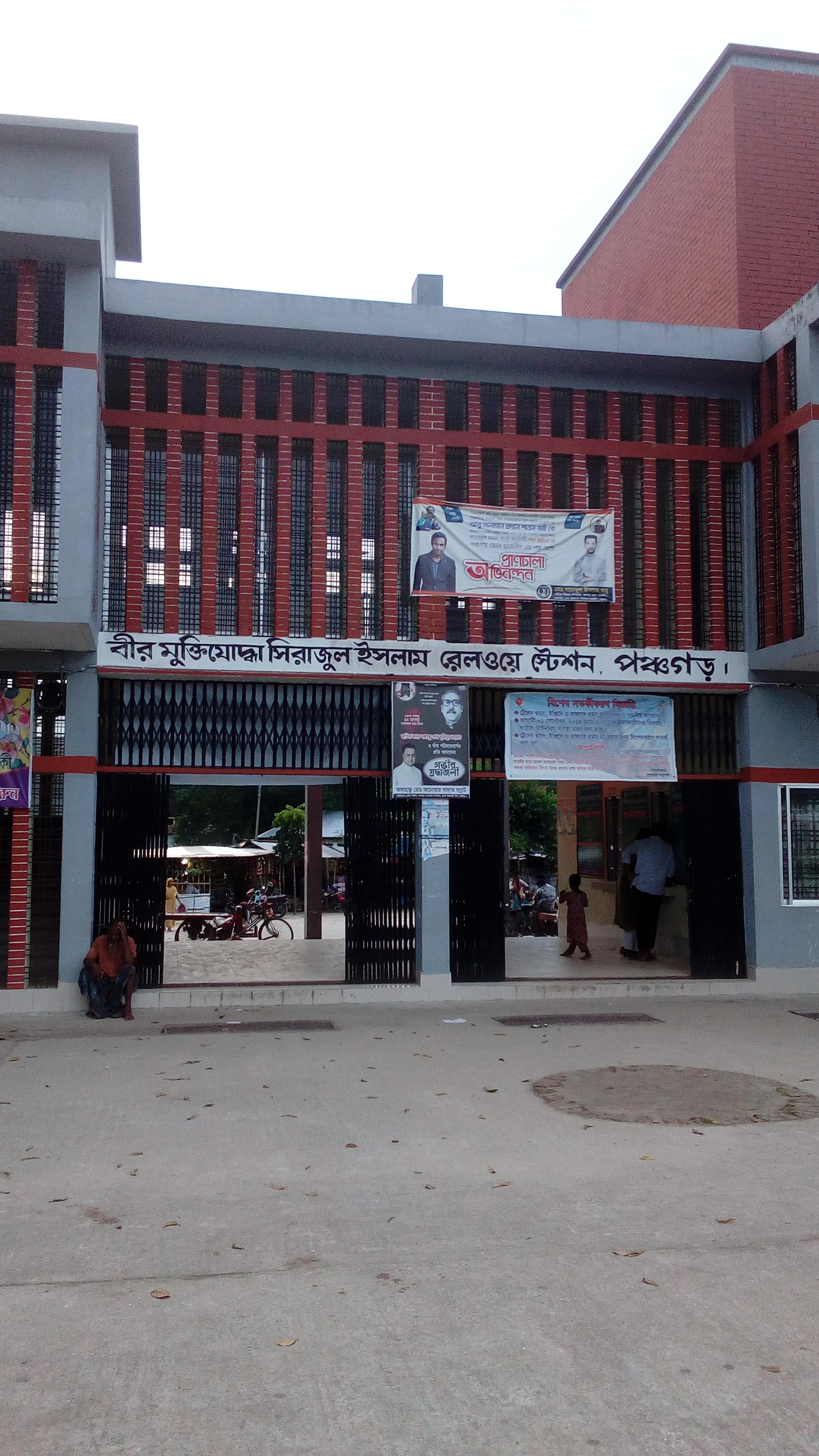

General information
- Other names: B. Sirajul Islam railway station
- Location: Panchagarh, Rangpur; Bangladesh
- Coordinates: 26.3265°N 88.5355°E
- Line: Parbatipur–Panchagarh line
- Platforms: 2

Construction
- Structure type: Standard (on ground station)

Other information
- Status: Functioning
- Station code: PCGH
- Zone(s): West Zone
- Division(s): Pakshi
- Fare zone: West Zone

History
- Opened: 1967; 59 years ago
- Former names: North Bengal Railway
Route map
Location

Panchagarh railway station (Bengali: পঞ্চগড় রেলওয়ে স্টেশন), formerly Bir Muktijoddha Sirajul Islam railway station, is a station in Panchagarh District of Rangpur division of Bangladesh. It is located near the district town and is the last railway station in North Bengal. In 2019, the name of the station was changed to Bir Muktijoddha Sirajul Islam Railway Station, but it was reverted to its original name in 2025.
