= Panchagarh =

Panchagarh পঞ্চগড়
- Town and Municipality
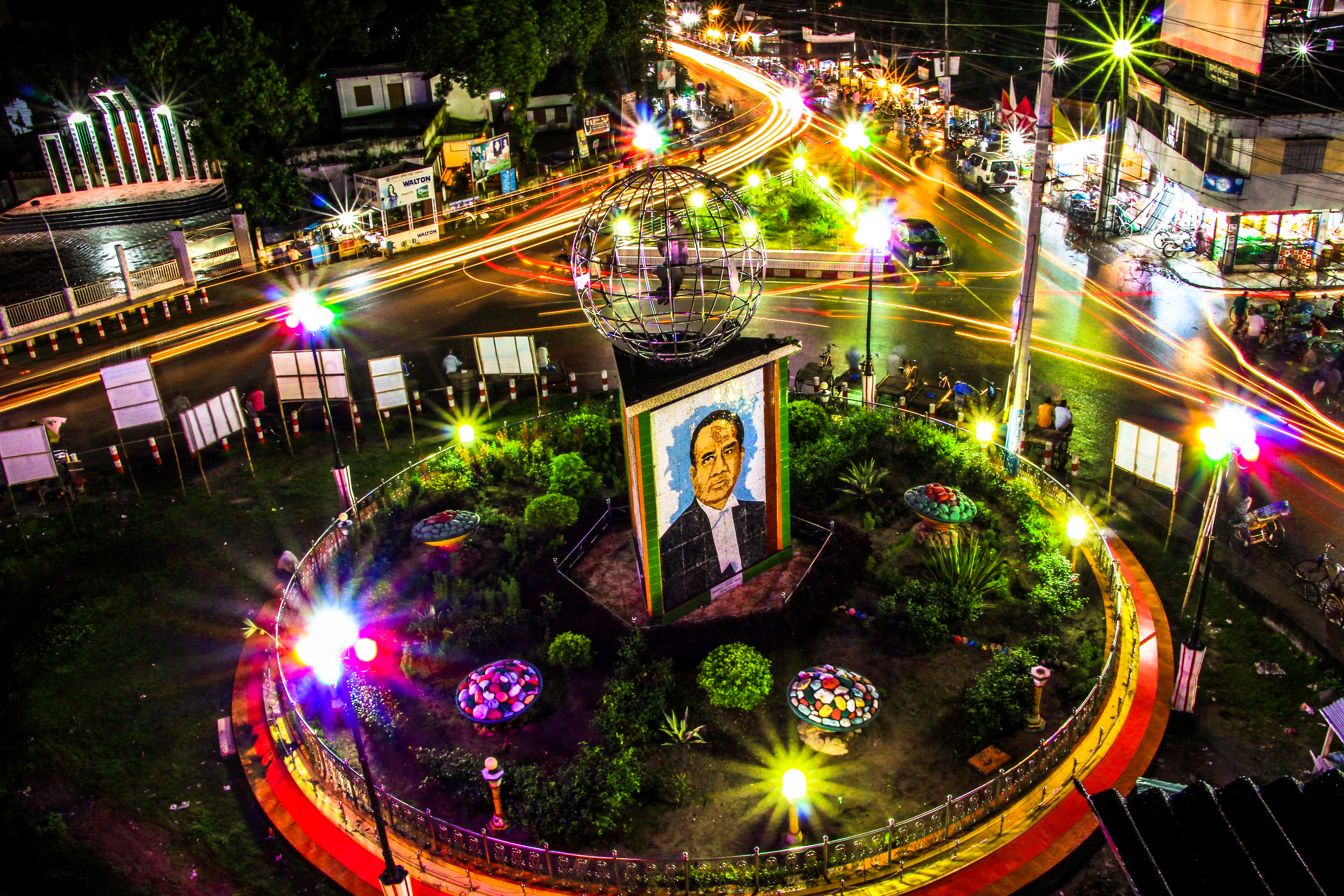
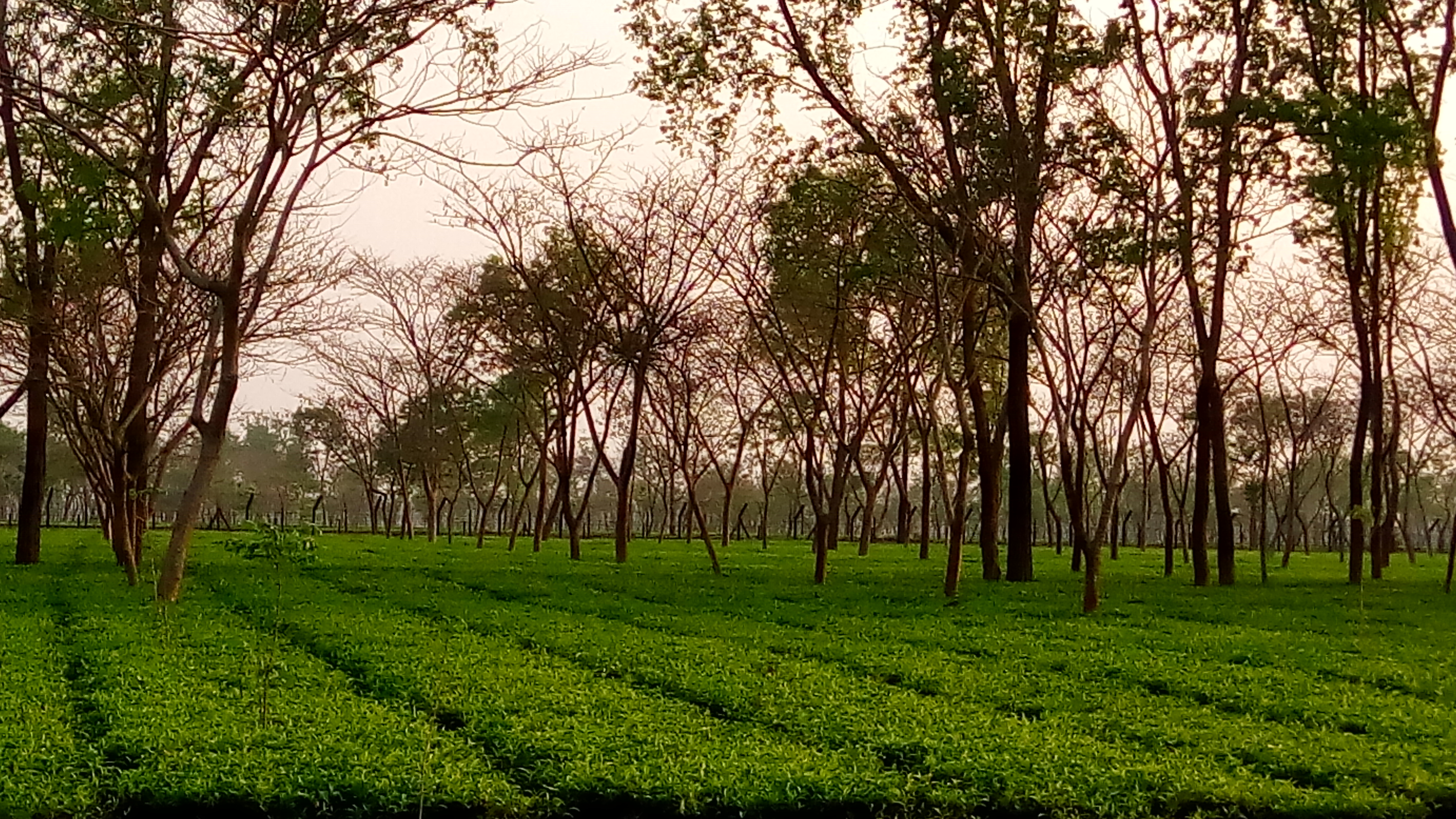
- From top (clockwise): Sher-e-Bangla Park and Panchagarh Tea Garden

- Location in Rangpur Division Location in Bangladesh
- Coordinates: 26°20′04″N 88°33′30″E
- Country: Bangladesh
- Division: Rangpur Division
- District: Panchagarh District
- Upazila: Panchagarh Sadar Upazila
- Municipality: 15 June 1985

Government
  - Type: Paurashava
  - Body: Panchagarh Municipality
  - Administrator: Sima Sharmin

Area
  - Total: 13.63 km^{2} (5.26 sq mi)

Population (2022)
  - Total: 57,010
  - Density: 4,183/km^{2} (10,830/sq mi)
  - Ethnicities: Bengali
- Time zone: UTC+6 (BST)
- Postal code: 5000
- National Dialing Code: +880
- Local Dialing Code: 0561
- Website: panchagarhmunicipality.gov.bd

Panchagarh Municipality mahallah geocode map

Panchagarh (Bengali: পঞ্চগড়) is a town and a municipality in Panchagarh District, Rangpur Division, in northern Bangladesh. Situated on the banks of the Karatoya River, it serves as the administrative headquarters of both Panchagarh District and Panchagarh Sadar Upazila. It is the northernmost municipality in Bangladesh.

== Etymology ==
There are two main beliefs associated with the name of the district. The first is that Panchargarh was named after an area called Pancha Nagari in the kingdom of Pundu Nagar. The second is that it was named for the five forts (or garh) in the region. The forts were Bhitargarh, Hosaingarh, Mirgarh, Rajangarh, and Devengarh, hence the name Panchagarh, meaning 'five forts'.

== Demographics ==
Religions in Panchagarh (2011)
Religion	Percent
Islam	95.68%
Hinduism	4.27%
Other or not stated	0.05%

According to the 2022 Bangladesh census, Panchagarh city had a population of 57,010 and a literacy rate of 85.80%.

According to the 2011 Bangladesh census, Panchagarh city had 10,105 households and a population of 45,589. 8,891 (19.50%) were under 10 years of age. Panchagarh had a literacy rate (age 7 and over) of 70.31%, compared to the national average of 51.8%, and a sex ratio of 962 females per 1000 males.

== Sources ==
- Leung, M.; Meggitt, B. (2012). "Panchagarh". Bangladesh. AA Publishing Series. Bradt Travel Guides. pp. 359–360. ISBN 978-1-84162-409-9.
