= Natore railway station =

Railway station in Bangladesh

Natore নাটোর
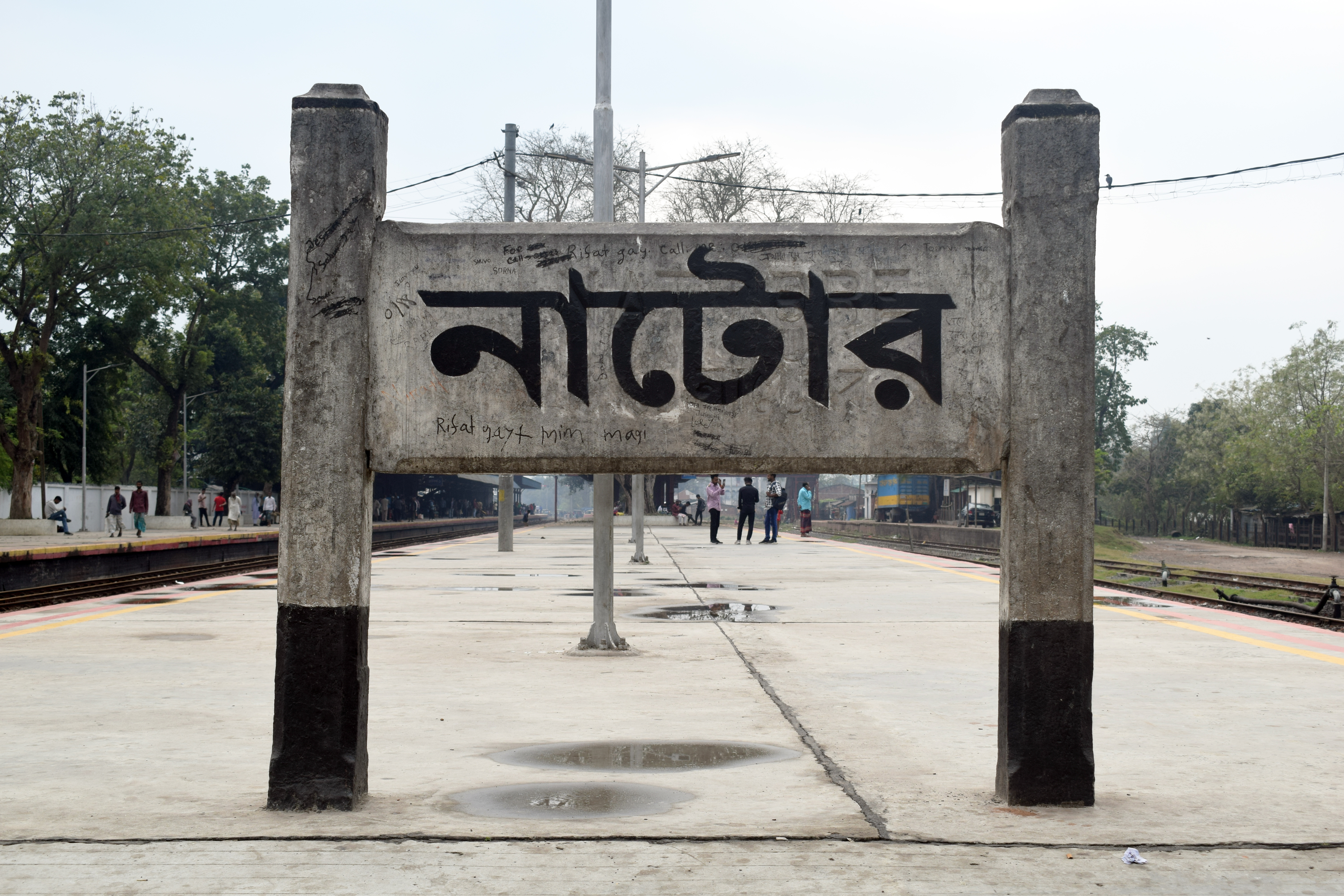

General information
- Location: Natore, Natore District, Rajshahi Division; Bangladesh
- Coordinates: 24.4108131°N 88.9665897°E
- Owner: Bangladesh Railway
- Line: Chilahati–Parbatipur–Santahar–Darshana line
- Platforms: 3
- Tracks: 5

Construction
- Structure type: Standard (on ground station)
- Parking: Yes
- Cycle facilities: Yes
- Accessible: Yes

Other information
- Status: Opened
- Station code: NTE
- Zone(s): West Zone
- Division(s): Pakshi

History
- Opened: 1878; 148 years ago
- Rebuilt: 2017

Services
Preceding station	Bangladesh Railway	Following station
Basudebpur (Natore) towards Chilahati	Chilahati–Parbatipur–Santahar–Darshana	Yasinpur towards Darshana
Location

Natore railway station is a railway station on Chilahati–Parbatipur–Santahar–Darshana line. This station is located in Natore. This railway station has more train toward Dhaka than any other station in Bangladesh.

== History ==
From 1878, the railway route from Kolkata, then called Calcutta, to Siliguri was in two laps. The first lap was a 185 km journey along the Eastern Bengal State Railway from Calcutta Station (later renamed Sealdah) to Damookdeah Ghat on the southern bank of the Padma River, then across the river in a ferry and the second lap of the journey. A 336 km metre gauge line of the North Bengal Railway linked Saraghat on the northern bank of the Padma to Siliguri. It was during this period that Natore came up as a railway station.

The Kolkata-Siliguri main line was converted to broad gauge in stages. The Shakole-Santahar section was converted in 1910–1914, when Hardinge Bridge was under construction. The Hardinge Bridge was opened in 1915.

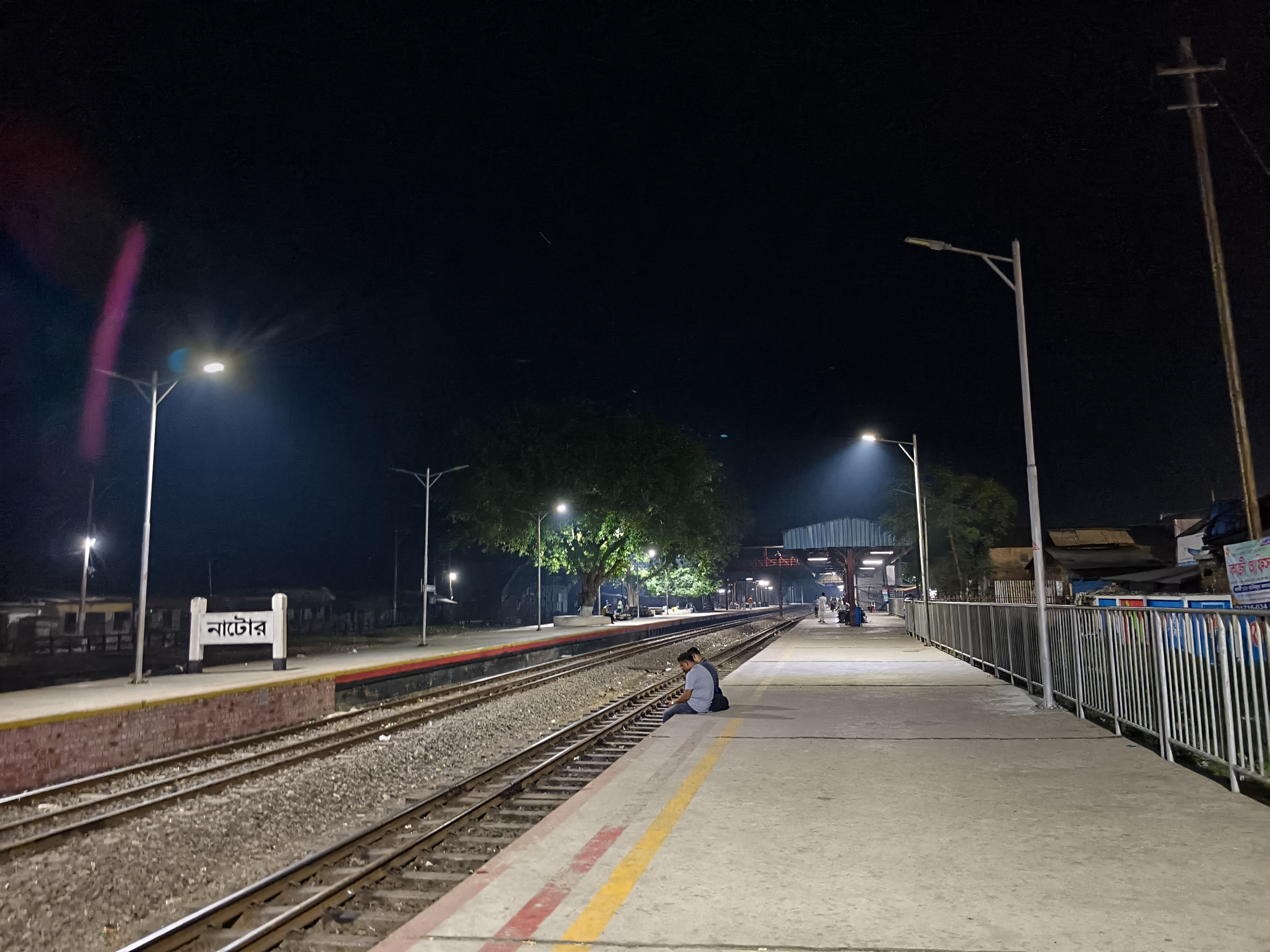
Natore railway station In Night
