= Rangpur Division =

Division in Bangladesh

Rangpur Division রংপুর বিভাগ
- Division of Bangladesh
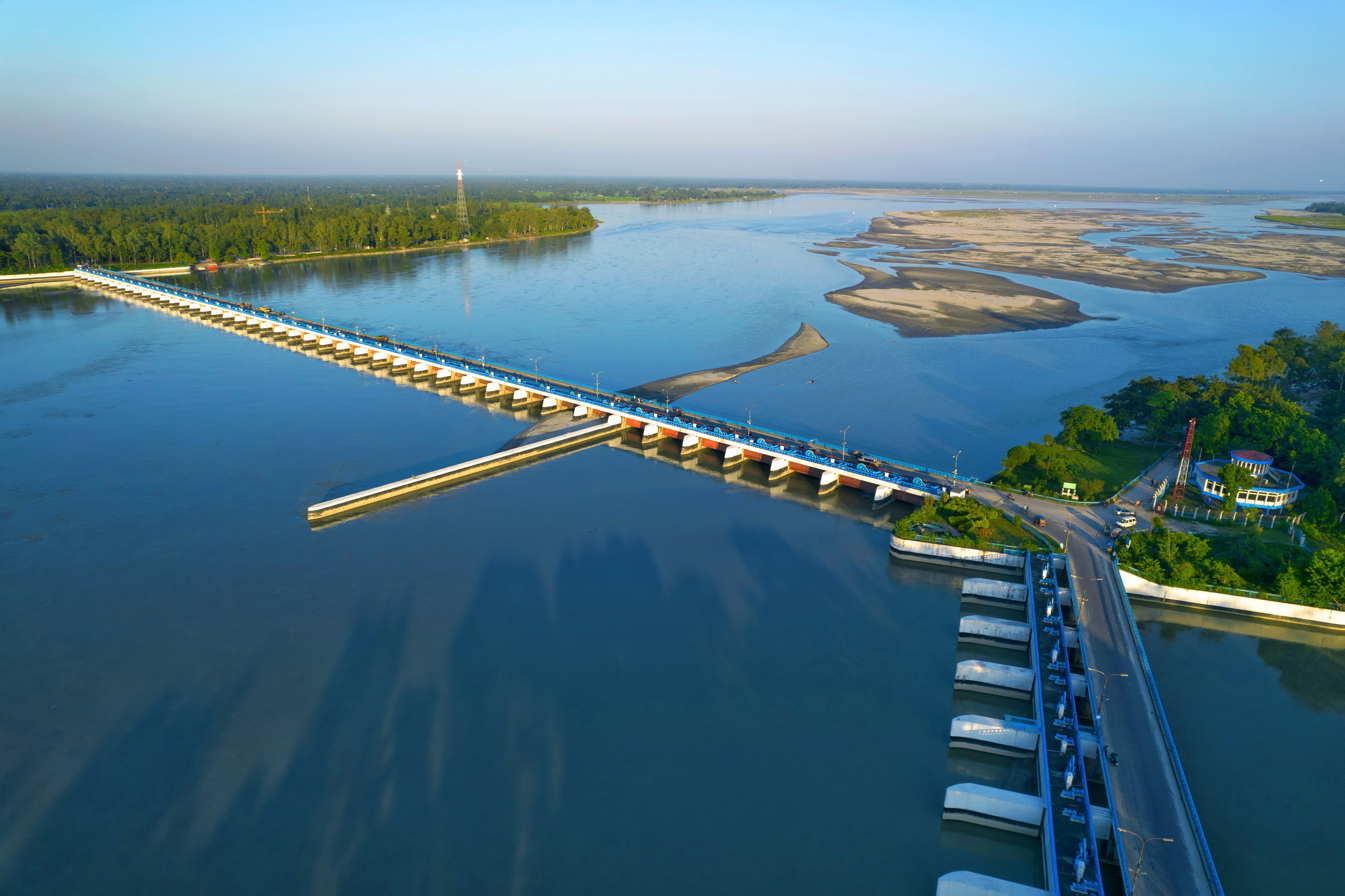
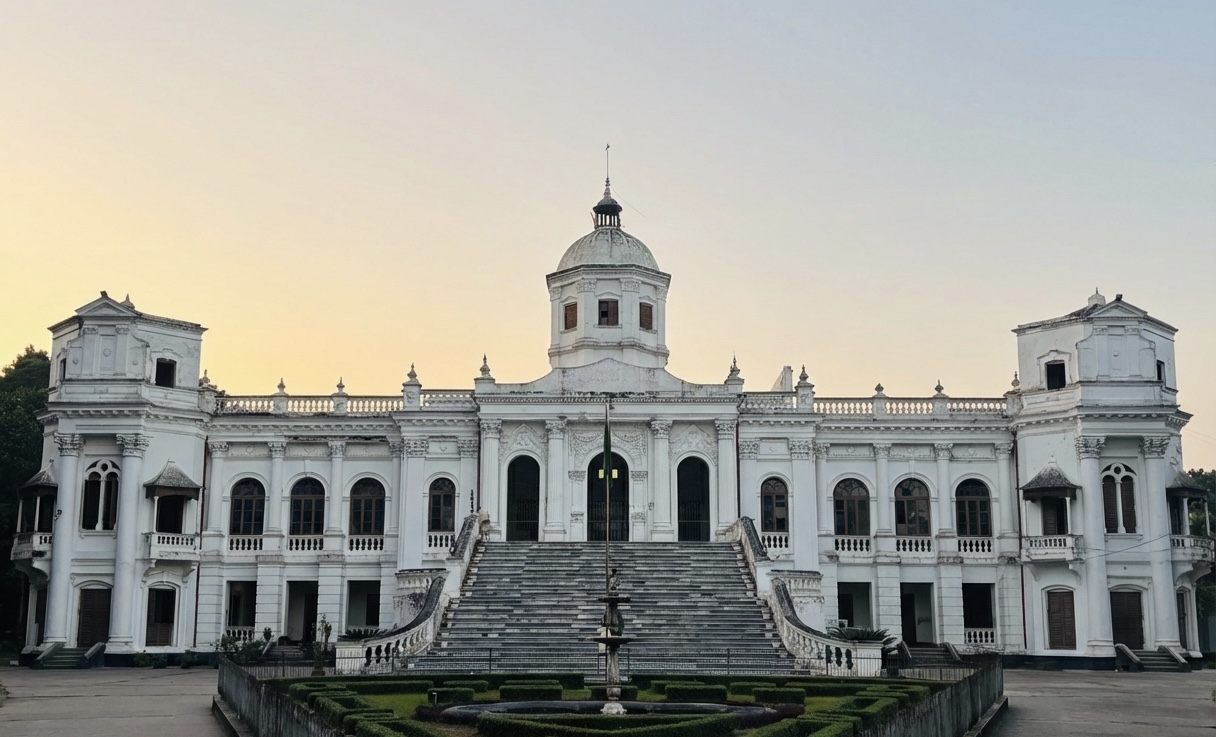
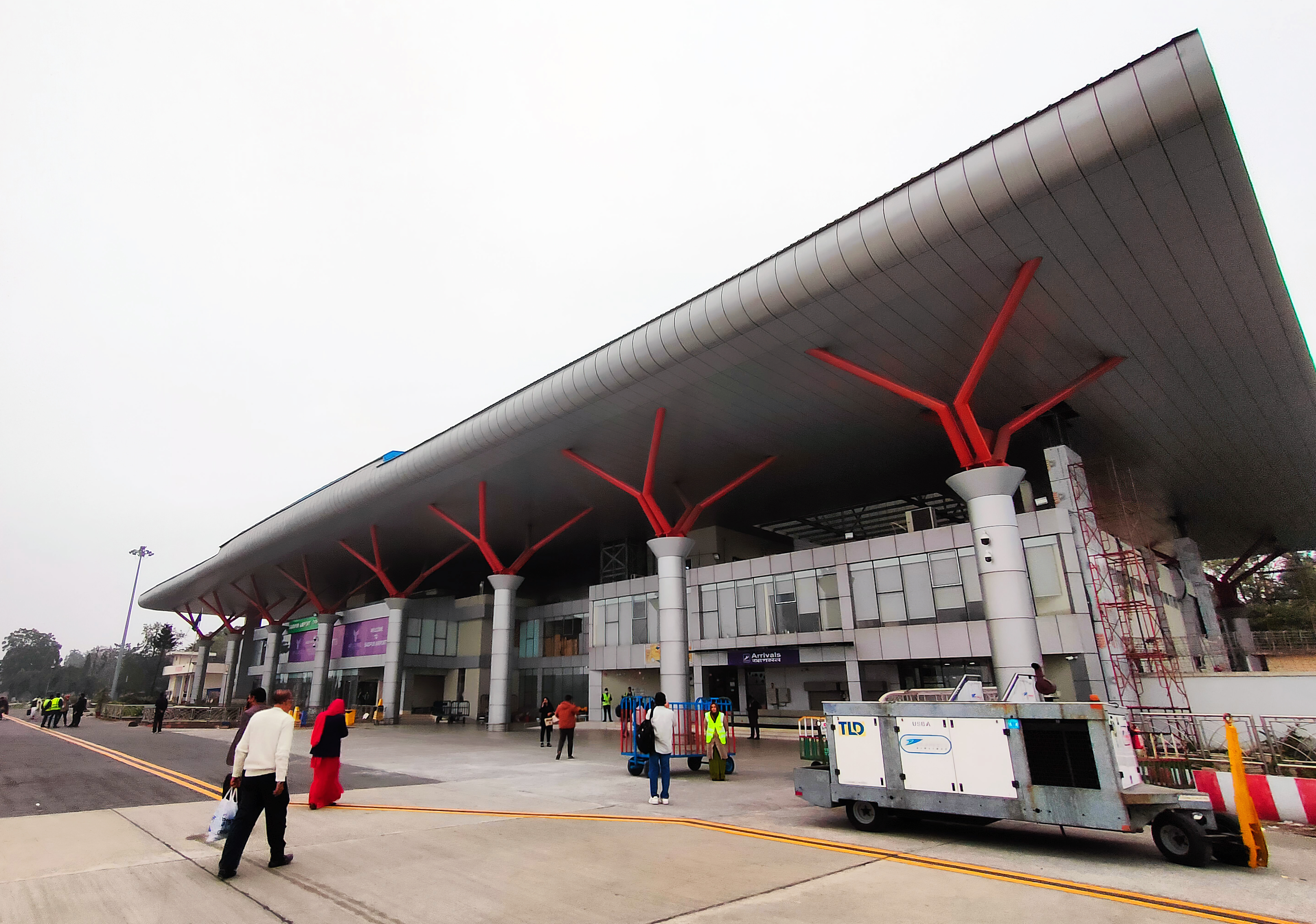
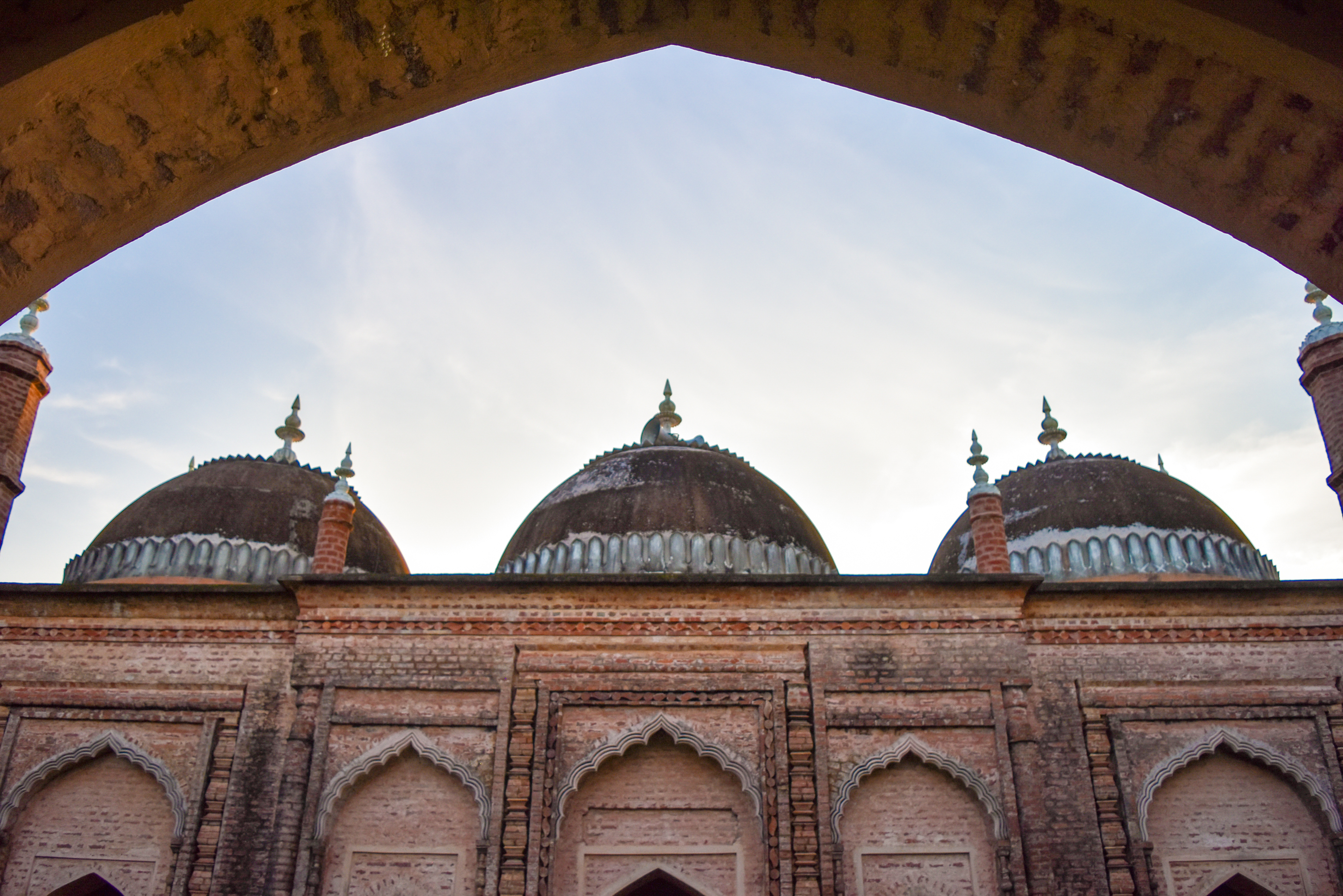
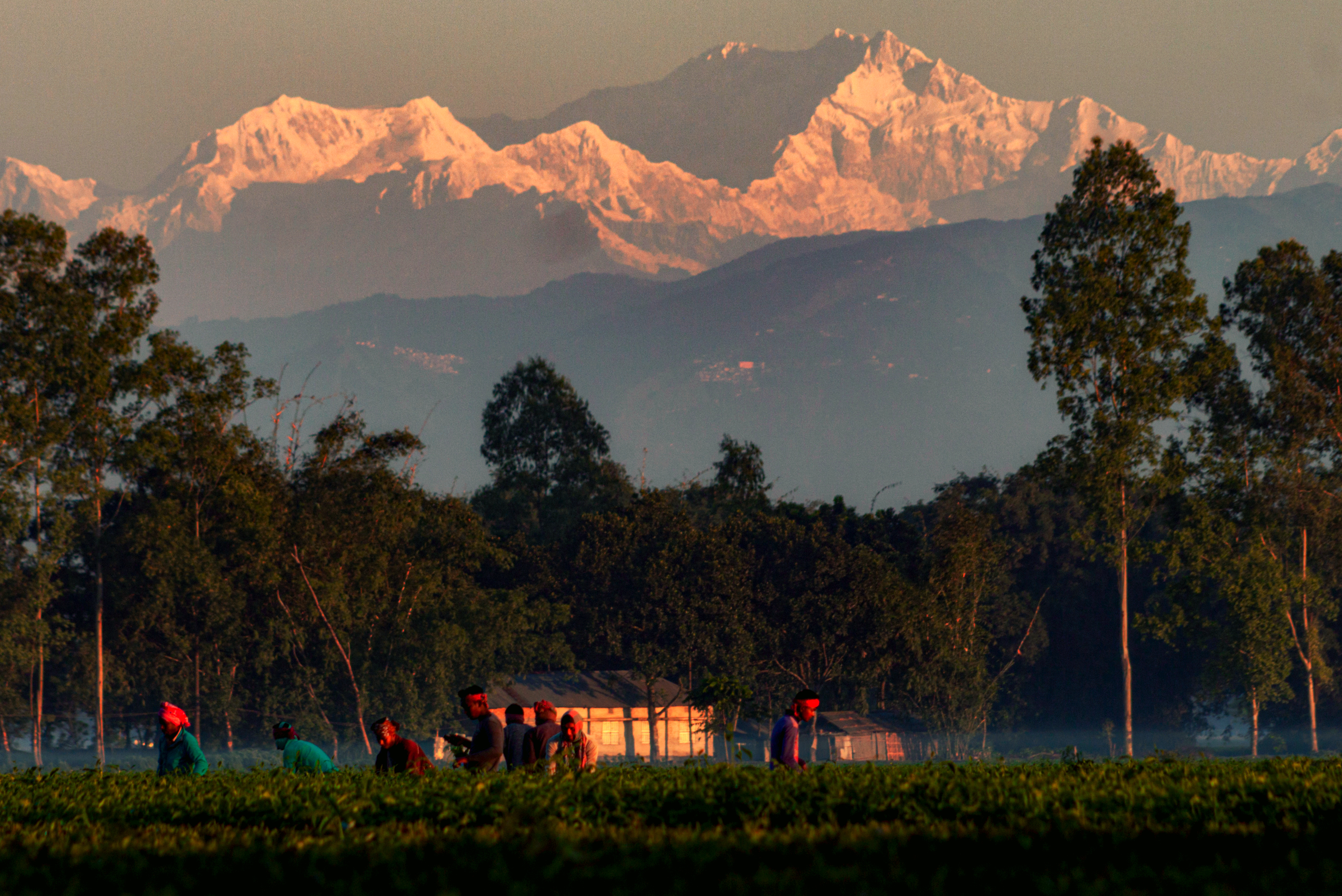
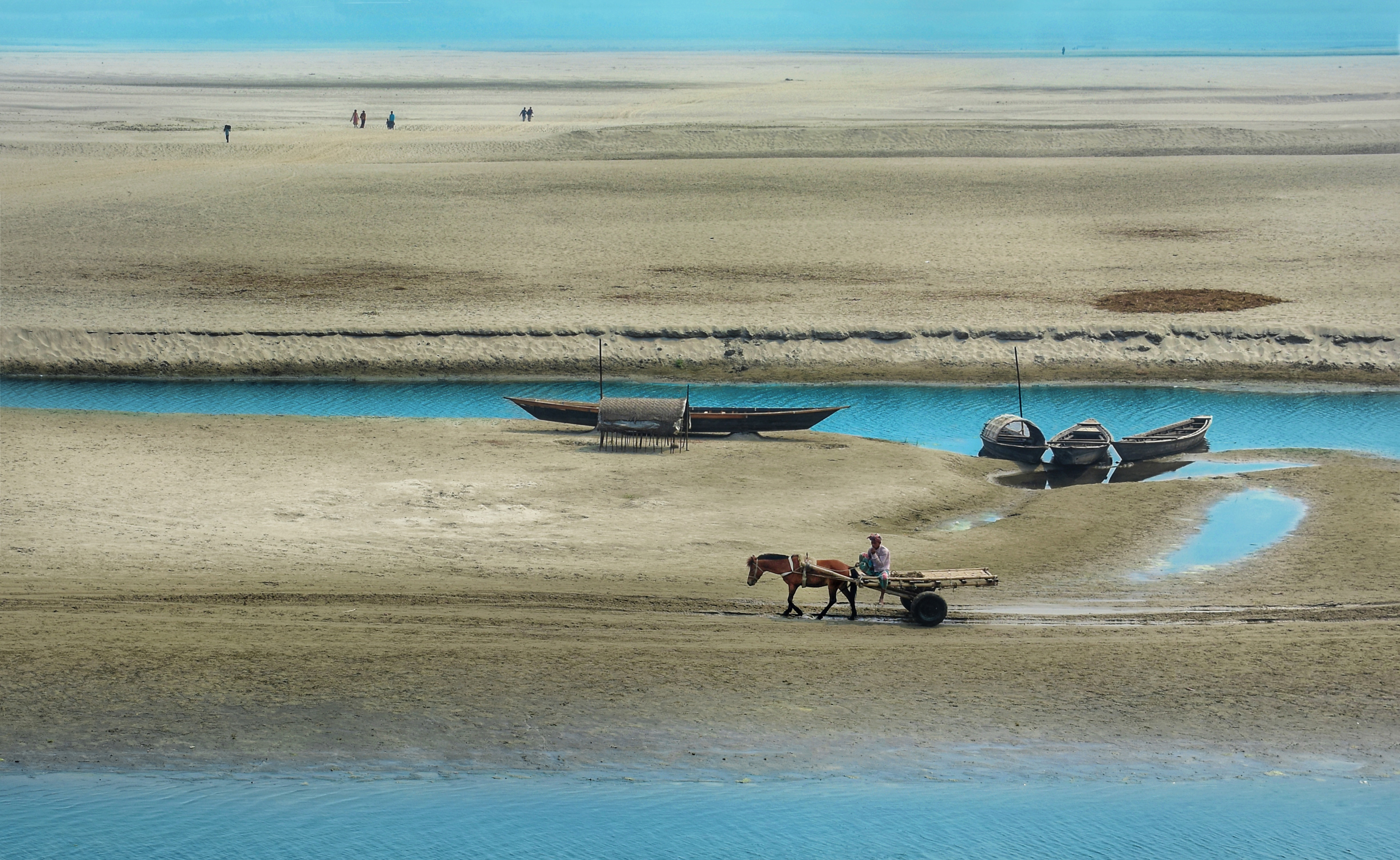
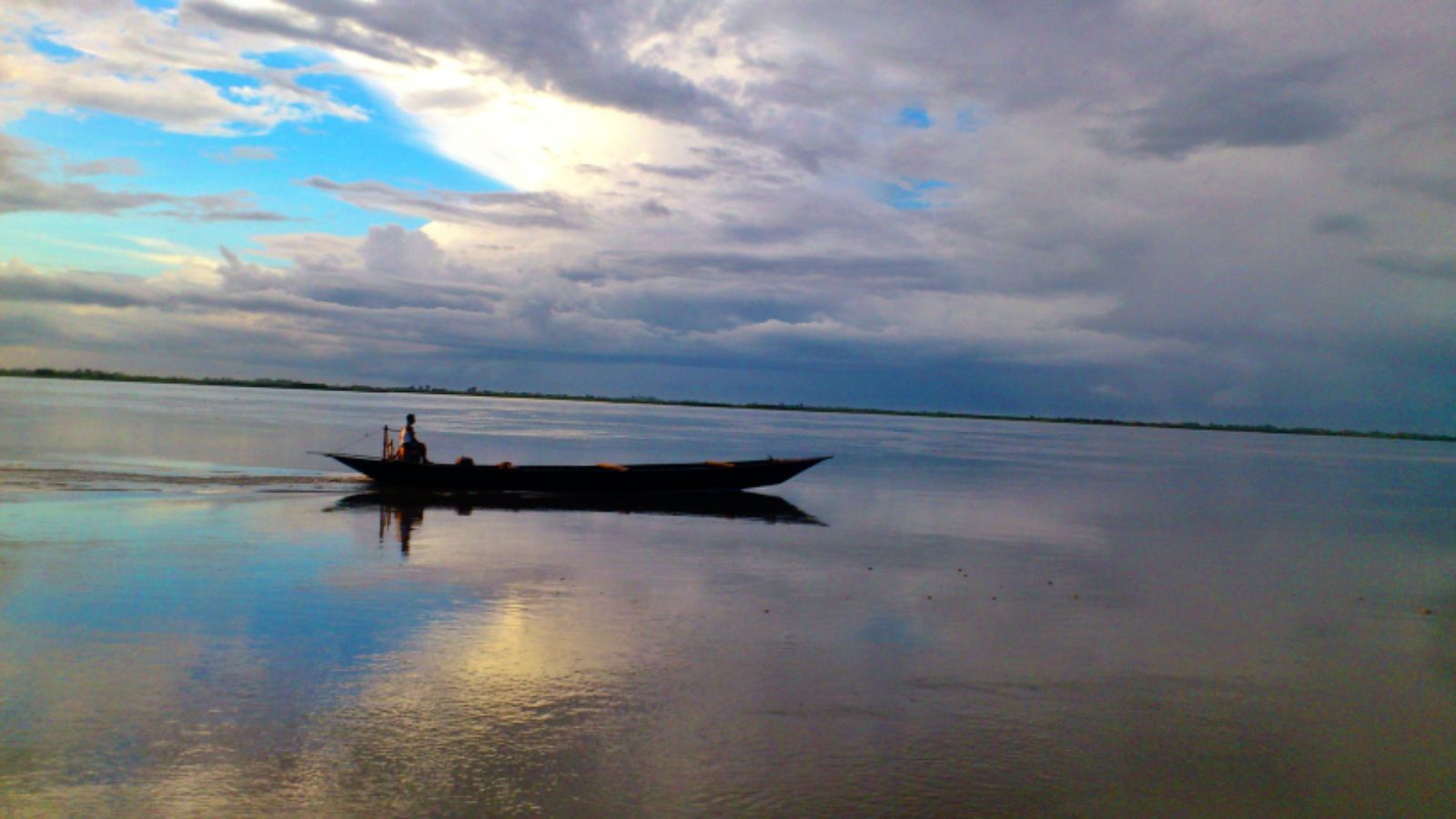
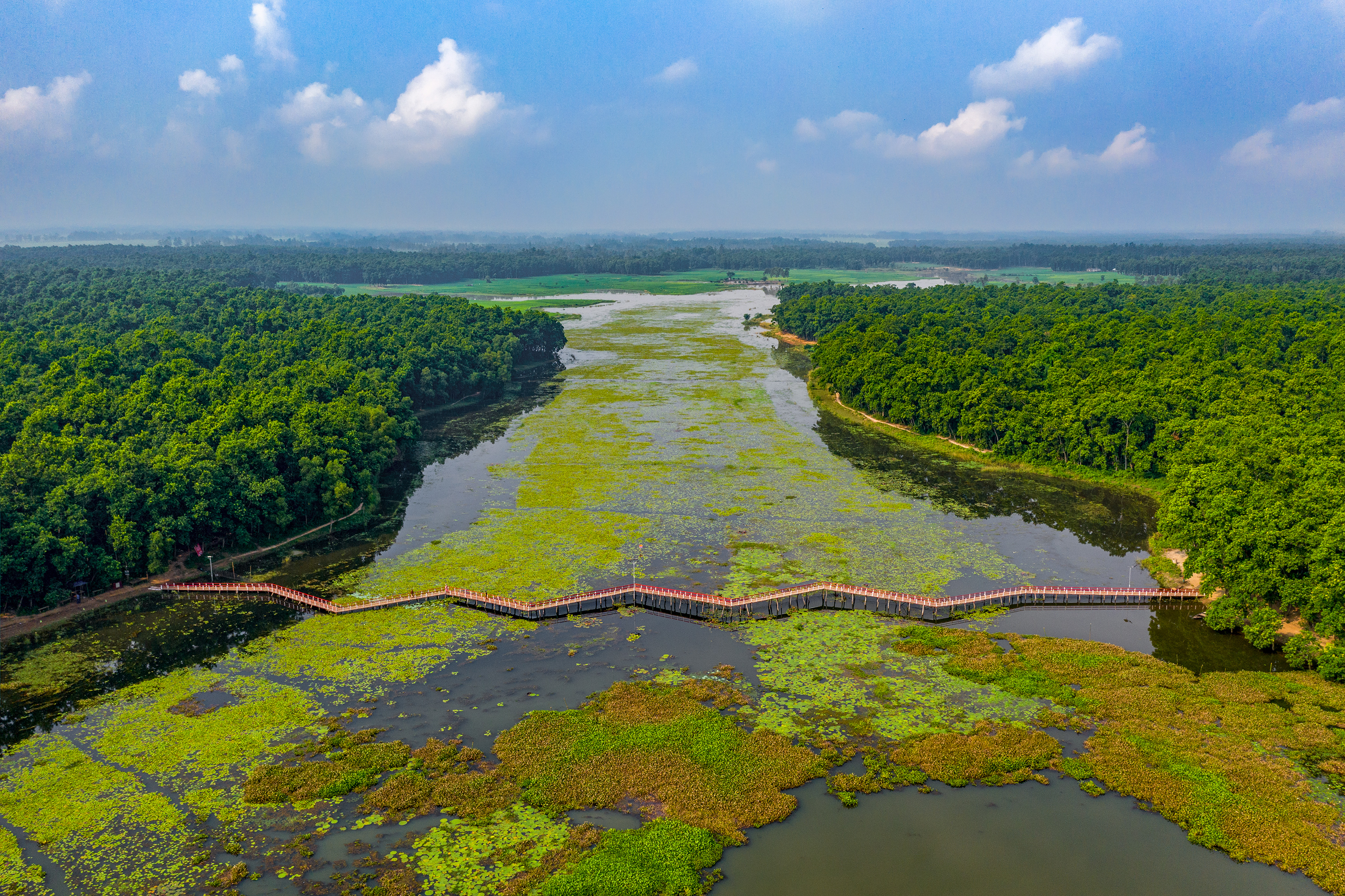
- Teesta Barrage in Lalmonirhat Tajhat Palace in Rangpur Saidpur Airport in Nilphamari Balia Mosque in Thakurgaon Tea Garden in Panchagarh Balasi Ghat in Gaibandha Jamuna River in Kurigram Nawabganj National Park in Dinajpur
- Nickname: North Bengal
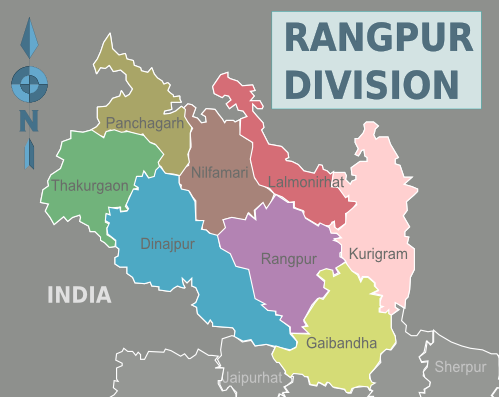
- Coordinates: 25°50′N 89°00′E
- Country: Bangladesh
- Established: 1 July 2010
- Capital and largest city: Rangpur City

Government
  - Divisional Commissioner: Md. Shahidul Islam
  - Deputy Inspector General: Aminul Islam
  - Parliamentary constituency: Jatiya Sangsad (33 seats)

Area
  - Total: 16,184.99 km^{2} (6,249.06 sq mi)
  - Rank: 5th

Dimensions
  - Length: 216 km (134 mi)
  - Width: 85 km (53 mi)
- Elevation: 42 m (138 ft)
- Highest elevation: 134 m (440 ft)
- Lowest elevation: 10 m (33 ft)

Population (2022)
  - Total: 17,610,956
  - Rank: 4th
  - Density: 1,088.104/km^{2} (2,818.177/sq mi)
- Demonym: Rangpuriya

Languages
  - Official language: Bengali • English
  - Regional language: Rangpuri
  - Indigenous minority languages: List: Santali; Mundari; Kurukh; Odia; Koch; Assamese
- Time zone: UTC+6:00 (BST)
- Postal Code: 5XXX
- ISO 3166 code: BD-F
- HDI (2022): ▲0.656 medium
- National Highway: N5; Asian Highway 2
- Airport: Saidpur Airport
- Notable cricket teams: Rangpur Riders Rangpur Division
- Website: rangpurdiv.gov.bd

Rangpur Division (/rʌŋˈpʊər/; Bengali: রংপুর বিভাগ, romanized: Rongpur Bivag; pronounced [rɔŋpuɾ bibʱag]) is a first-level administrative division of Bangladesh. It covers the northernmost part of the country with a population of about 18 million inhabitants within an area of around 16,000 km^{2} (6,200 sq mi). Rangpur Division shares borders with the Rajshahi and Mymensingh divisions. It is also bordered by the Indian states of West Bengal, Assam and Meghalaya and separated from Bhutan and Nepal by the Siliguri Corridor, and from China by the Indian state of Sikkim. Rangpur City is the administrative headquarter and the largest city. Rangpur Division includes the Teesta and Jamuna rivers.

The Rangpur division consists of eight districts. There are 58 upazilas or subdistricts under these eight districts. The major cities of Rangpur Division are Rangpur, Dinajpur, and Saidpur.

== History ==
Mansingh, commander of Emperor Akbar, conquered part of Rangpur in 1575. Rangpur came completely under the Mughal empire in 1686. Mughalbasa and Mughalhat of Kurigram district still bear marks of the Mughal rule in the region. During the Mughal rule part of Rangpur was under the sarkar of Ghoraghat, and part under the sarkar of Pinjarah. Ghoraghat has been mentioned in the historic book of Riyaz-us-Salatin. During the early period of the East-India Company rule Fakir-Sannyasi Rebellion took place.

== Administrative divisions ==
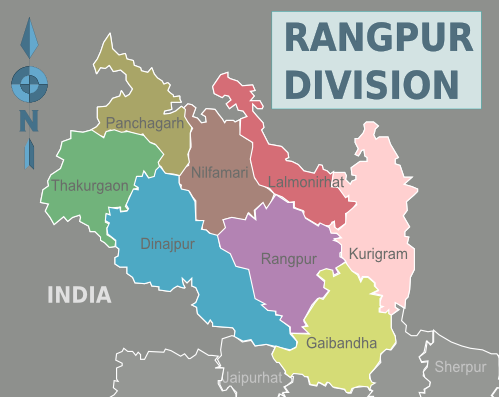
Districts

Rangpur Division has 8 Districts, 58 upazilas, 1 city corporation, 21 pourasavas and 536 union councils.

Districts of Rangpur Division
| District Name | Capital | Area (km^{2}) | Population (2022) |
|---|---|---|---|
| Rangpur District | Rangpur | 2,400.56 | 3,169,615 |
| Dinajpur District | Dinajpur | 3,444.30 | 3,315,238 |
| Kurigram District | Kurigram | 2,245.04 | 2,329,161 |
| Gaibandha District | Gaibandha | 2,179.27 | 2,562,232 |
| Lalmonirhat District | Lalmonirhat | 1,247.371 | 1,428,406 |
| Nilphamari District | Nilphamari | 1,643.70 | 2,092,567 |
| Panchagarh District | Panchagarh | 1,404.63 | 1,179,843 |
| Thakurgaon District | Thakurgaon | 1,781.74 | 1,533,894 |
| Total | - | 16,184.99 | 17,610,956 |

== Demographics ==
Religions in Rangpur division (2022)
| Religion | Percent |
| Muslims | 86.51% |
| Hindus | 12.98% |
| Christians | 0.41% |
| Buddhism | 0.02% |
| Other or not stated | 0.08% |

According to the 2022 census, Rangpur Division has a total population of 17,610,956, with a population density of 1088/km^{2}.

The majority of the population are Muslims, comprising 86.51%, followed by Hindus at approximately 12.98%. A small percentage of the population adheres to Christianity and other religions.

Bengalis are the largest ethnic community and some other small native ethnic groups includes the Santal, Munda, Oraon, Rajbanshi, Kaibarta, Koch, Harijan etc.

In comparison, the 2011 census recorded a total population of 15,787,758, with a population density of 980/km^{2}. At that time, males made up 51.18% of the population, while 48.82% of the population was female.

== Economy ==
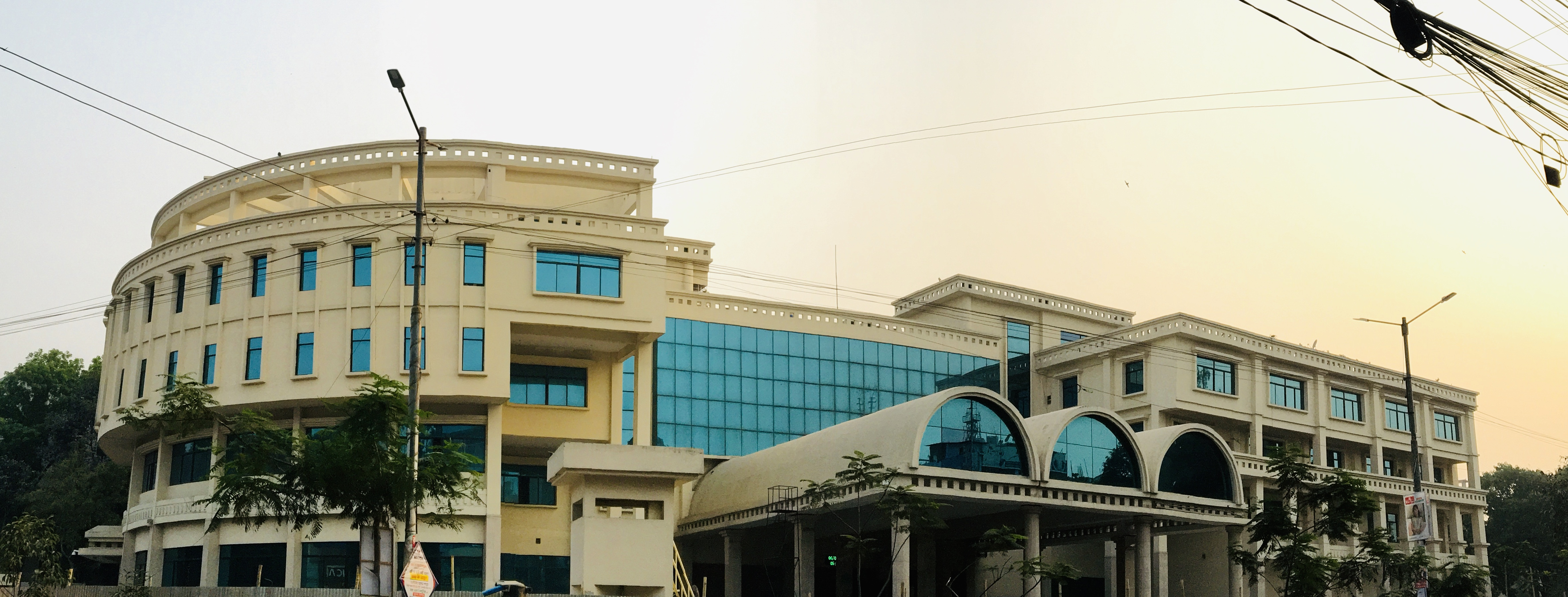
Bangladesh bank Rangpur

The division was once considered the poorest division in Bangladesh—with over a third of the population living in extreme poverty as of 2016, according to World Bank data,

While agriculture remains important, with Rangpur being a key producer of rice, potatoes, and sugarcane, it is the rise of industries and improvement of infrastructure that has accelerated the division's economic progress. The development of industrial zones, access to utilities like gas and electricity, and improved transport networks have positioned Rangpur as a growing hub for industry and commerce, helping lift the division out of its past struggles.

This industrial and infrastructural growth reflects the determination and innovation of the people, transforming Rangpur into a region of increasing prosperity.

By 2026, this modernization expanded into the technology sector, with the Rangpur Hi-Tech Park hosting specialized cybersecurity firms to support the national financial infrastructure.

== Transportation ==
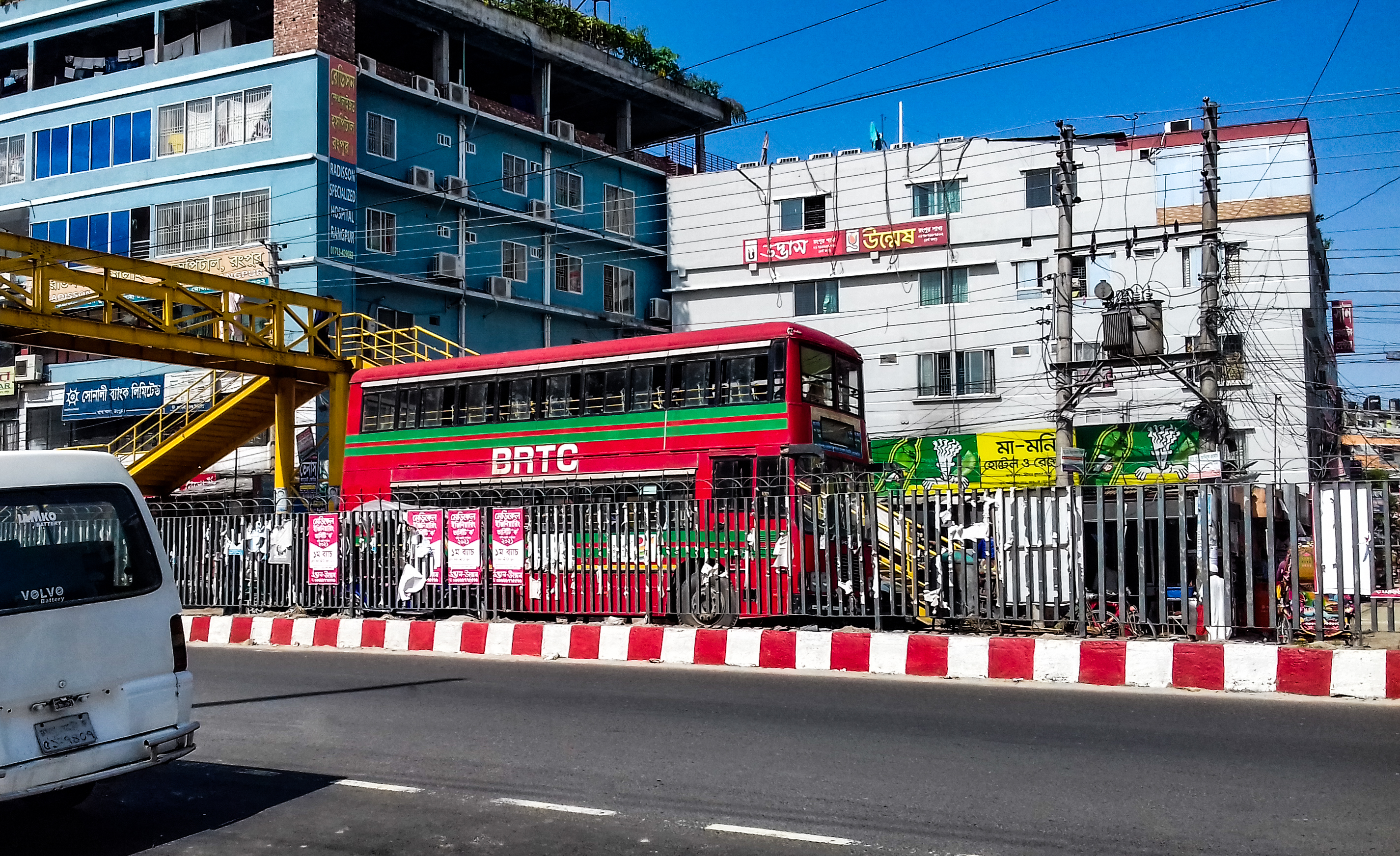
BRTC double decker bus

The main transportation methods here are by air, rail, or road. Saidpur Airport is the only civilian airport of this division. By rail, the district is accessible by the train Rangpur Express and the station Rangpur railway station.

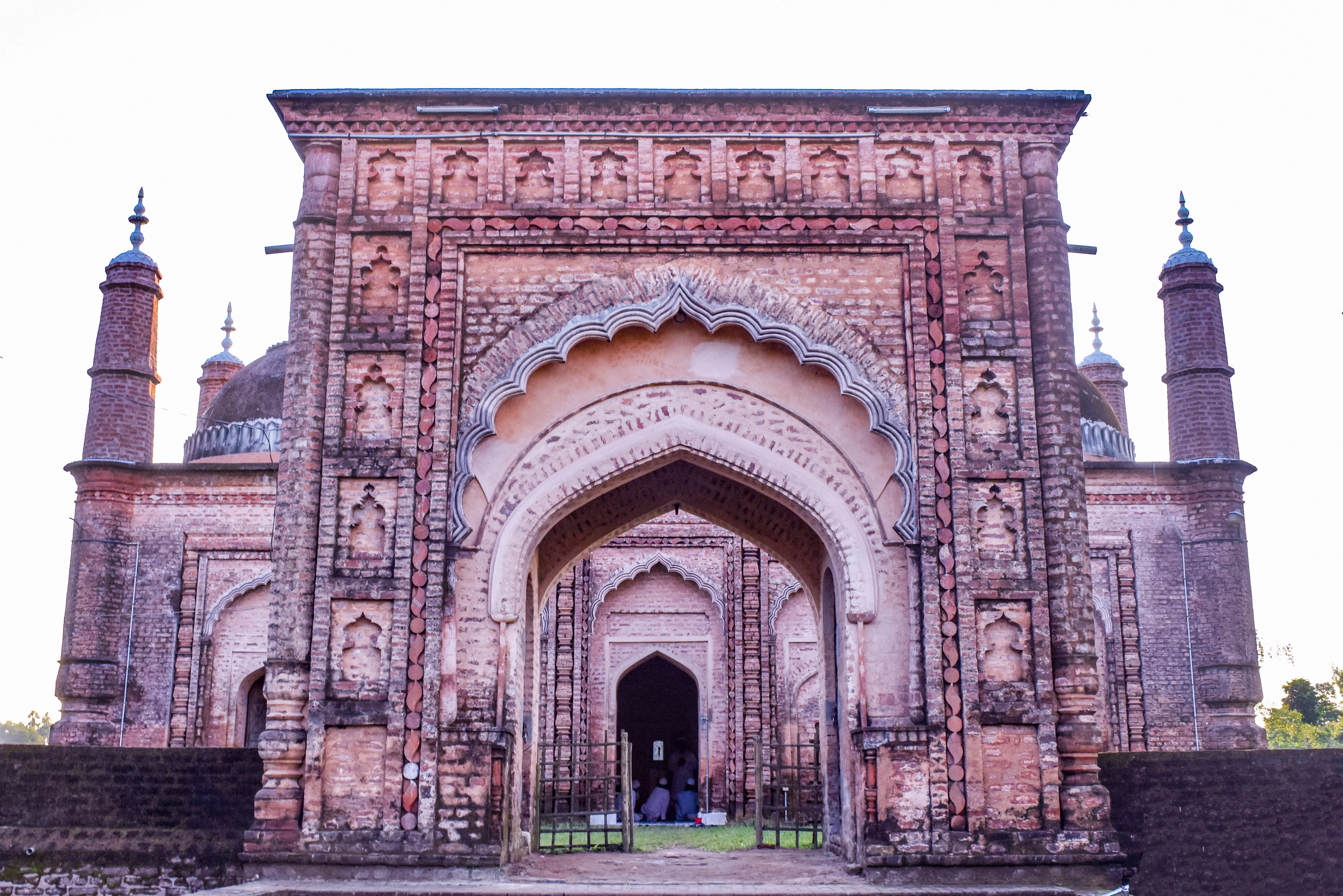
Balia Mosque

== Climate ==
Rangpur Division has a warm and temperate climate. The division experiences more rainfall in the summer than in winter, with an annual rainfall of 2498 mm. The average temperature in Rangpur is 24.3 °C, with the highest temperatures typically occurring in August and the coldest in January.

Summer lasts from June to September, with the heaviest rainfall in June (522 mm) and the least in December (6 mm).

September sees the highest relative humidity (50.41%), while March has the lowest.

March also has the highest sunshine hours, with an average of 9.51 hours per day, while January has the least (8.04 hours). The total annual sunshine in Rangpur is around 2802.78 hours, averaging 233.56 hours per month.

Climate data for Rangpur (1991–2020 normals, extremes 1883–present)
| Month | Jan | Feb | Mar | Apr | May | Jun | Jul | Aug | Sep | Oct | Nov | Dec | Year |
|---|---|---|---|---|---|---|---|---|---|---|---|---|---|
| Record high °C (°F) | 29.4 (84.9) | 34.4 (93.9) | 43.3 (109.9) | 42.5 (108.5) | 41.2 (106.2) | 38.2 (100.8) | 38.4 (101.1) | 39.8 (103.6) | 38.5 (101.3) | 37.2 (99.0) | 33.4 (92.1) | 30.6 (87.1) | 43.3 (109.9) |
| Mean daily maximum °C (°F) | 22.8 (73.0) | 26.4 (79.5) | 30.3 (86.5) | 31.5 (88.7) | 31.9 (89.4) | 32.1 (89.8) | 32.1 (89.8) | 32.5 (90.5) | 31.9 (89.4) | 31.0 (87.8) | 28.7 (83.7) | 25.0 (77.0) | 29.7 (85.5) |
| Daily mean °C (°F) | 16.1 (61.0) | 19.5 (67.1) | 23.7 (74.7) | 26.2 (79.2) | 27.5 (81.5) | 28.5 (83.3) | 28.9 (84.0) | 29.1 (84.4) | 28.3 (82.9) | 26.5 (79.7) | 22.5 (72.5) | 18.3 (64.9) | 24.6 (76.3) |
| Mean daily minimum °C (°F) | 10.9 (51.6) | 13.7 (56.7) | 17.6 (63.7) | 21.3 (70.3) | 23.4 (74.1) | 25.3 (77.5) | 26.2 (79.2) | 26.3 (79.3) | 25.5 (77.9) | 22.9 (73.2) | 17.7 (63.9) | 13.3 (55.9) | 20.3 (68.5) |
| Record low °C (°F) | 3.5 (38.3) | 3.7 (38.7) | 8.6 (47.5) | 14.7 (58.5) | 16.4 (61.5) | 19.4 (66.9) | 21.1 (70.0) | 20.7 (69.3) | 19.1 (66.4) | 14.2 (57.6) | 10.1 (50.2) | 5.2 (41.4) | 3.5 (38.3) |
| Average precipitation mm (inches) | 9 (0.4) | 10 (0.4) | 27 (1.1) | 121 (4.8) | 277 (10.9) | 426 (16.8) | 416 (16.4) | 343 (13.5) | 382 (15.0) | 171 (6.7) | 6 (0.2) | 4 (0.2) | 2,192 (86.4) |
| Average precipitation days (≥ 1 mm) | 1 | 2 | 3 | 8 | 15 | 19 | 19 | 17 | 15 | 7 | 1 | 1 | 108 |
| Average relative humidity (%) | 82 | 75 | 68 | 74 | 81 | 85 | 86 | 85 | 87 | 84 | 80 | 81 | 81 |
| Mean monthly sunshine hours | 184.6 | 206.9 | 239.3 | 210.0 | 199.4 | 150.2 | 154.9 | 172.0 | 165.5 | 227.8 | 236.6 | 214.8 | 2,362 |
Source 1: NOAA
Source 2: Bangladesh Meteorological Department (humidity 1981-2010)

== Health ==
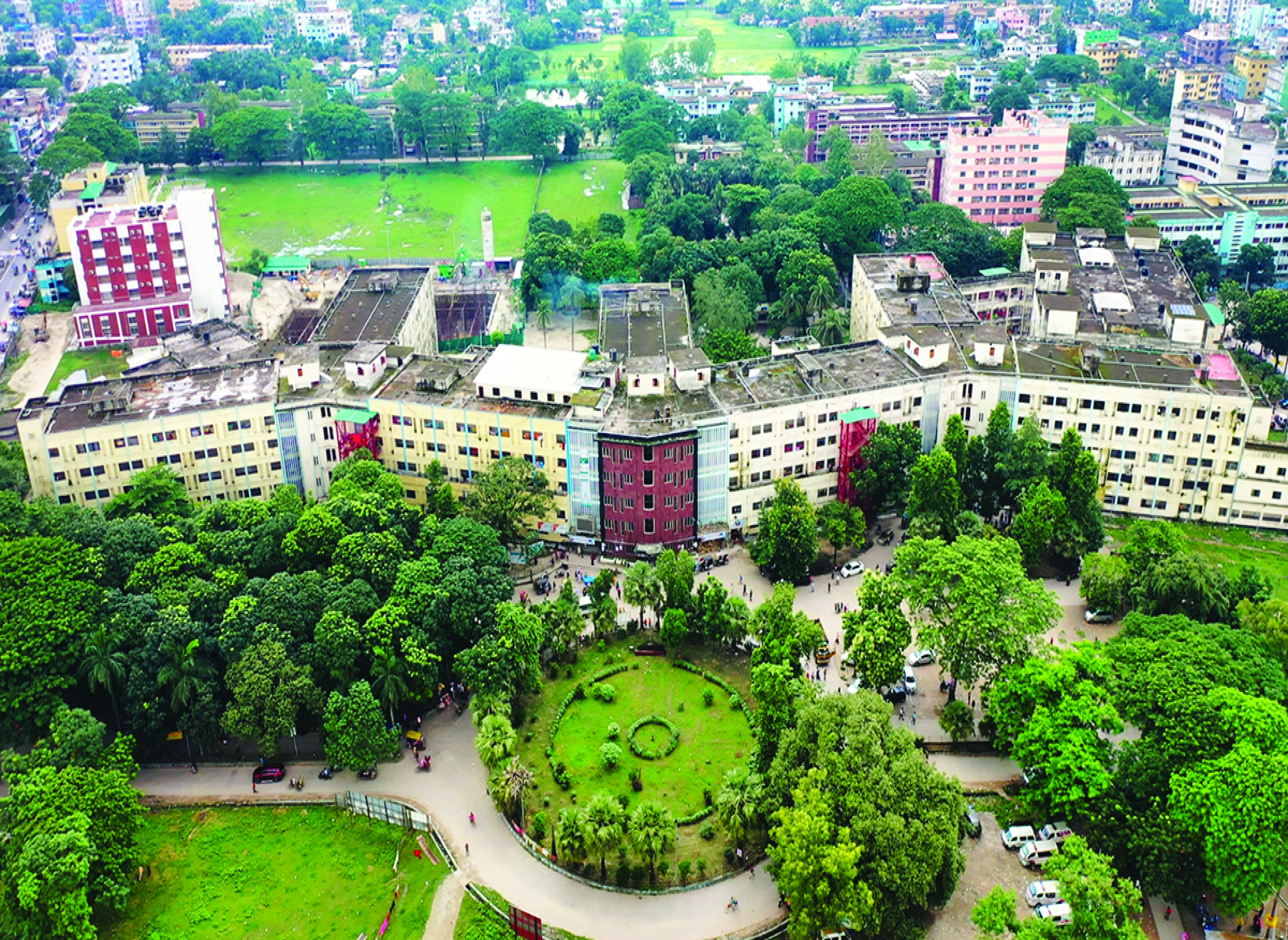
Rangpur Medical

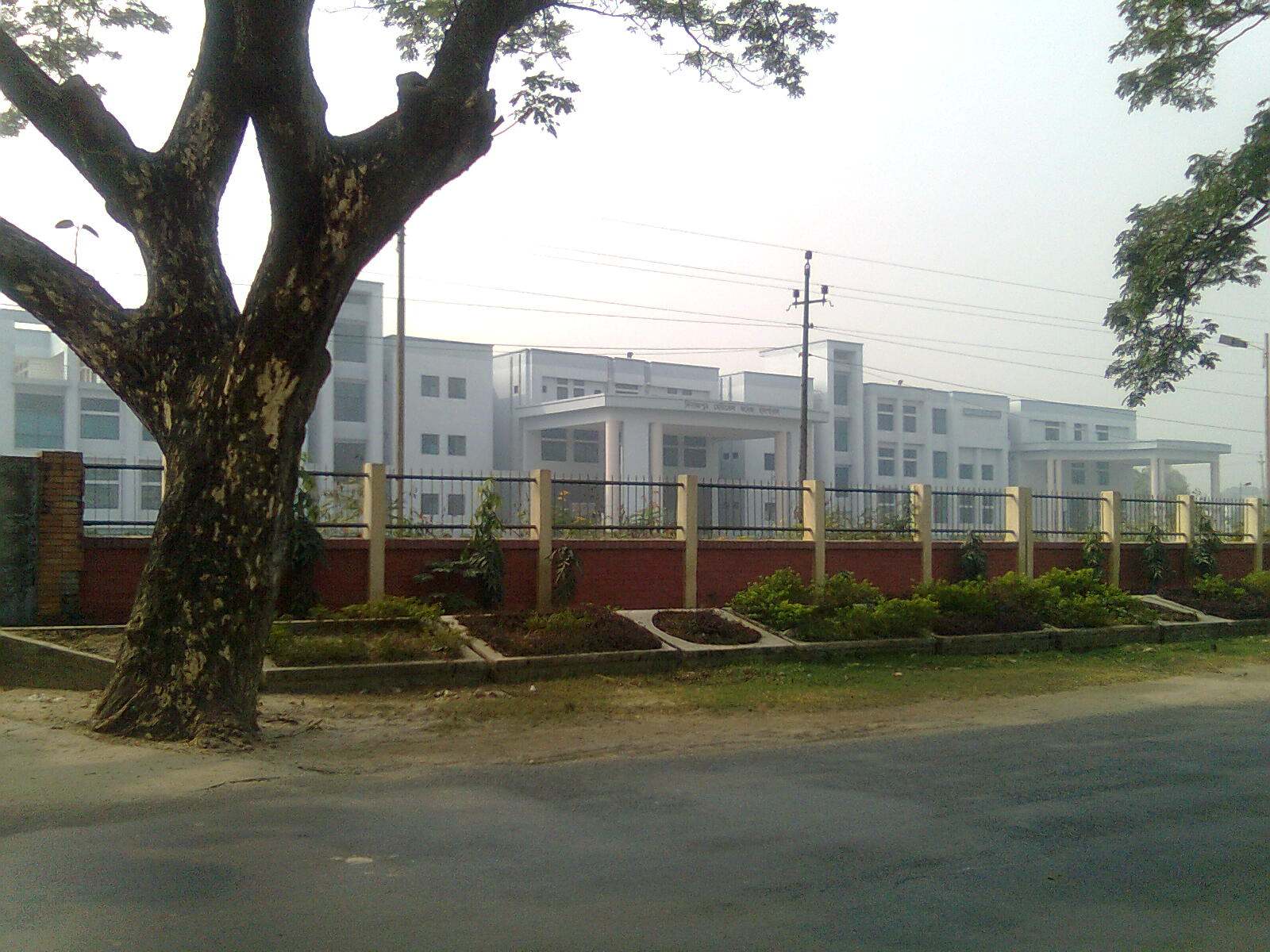
Dinajpur Medical

Rangpur Division's healthcare system is mainly centered in Rangpur City. Every district has a well-functioning hospital, and sub-districts are served by upazila health complexes. However, for better treatment, residents rely on Rangpur city. The city also has numerous private hospitals and clinics, such as Prime Medical.

== Legacy ==
Rangpur has lent its name to the fruit Rangpur (fruit) and Tanqueray Rangpur Gin.

== See also ==
- Divisions of Bangladesh
