= Dhaka Airport railway station =

Railway station in Dhaka, Bangladesh

Dhaka Airport ঢাকা বিমানবন্দর
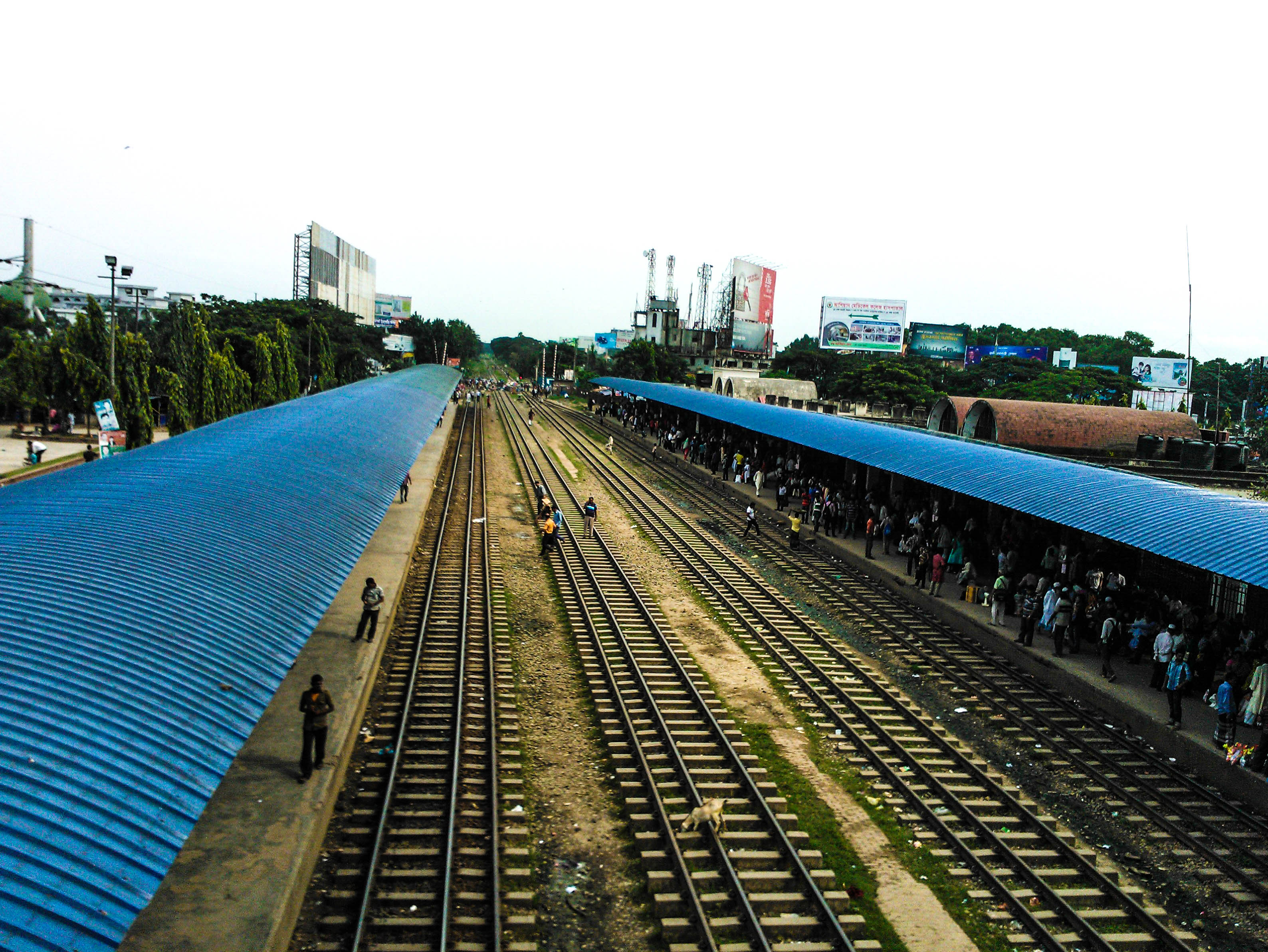
- Airport Railway Station in 2014

General information
- Other names: Dhaka Biman Bandar railway station
- Location: Airport Road, Dhaka; Bangladesh
- Coordinates: 23°51′8″N 90°24′30″E
- System: B-category station
- Owner: Bangladesh Railway
- Line: Narayanganj–Bahadurabad Ghat line
- Platforms: 2
- Tracks: 4
- Connections: DAC; MRT Line 1

Construction
- Structure type: Standard (on ground station)
- Parking: Yes
- Cycle facilities: Yes
- Accessible: Disabled access Computerized Ticketing Counters Luggage Checking System Food Plaza Kiosks WC Taxi Stand Public Transportation Metro interchange

Other information
- Status: Functioning
- Station code: DABB
- Zone(s): East Zone
- Division(s): Dhaka

History
- Opened: 1981

Services
Preceding station	Bangladesh Railway	Following station
Dhaka Cantonment towards Narayanganj	Narayanganj–Bahadurabad Ghat transfer at Tongi Junction	Tongi Junction towards Bahadurabad Ghat
Route map
Location

Airport railway station or Biman Bandar railway station is a railway station in Dhaka, the capital of Bangladesh. Situated opposite to Hazrat Shahjalal International Airport, it can be accessed from the Airport Road.

== Overview ==
It is the second stoppage for trains in Dhaka, after the Kamalapur railway station. Trains to and from India and locally Khulna, Jessore, Noakhali, Sylhet, Rajshahi, Chittagong, Comilla, and many important towns and cities stop at the station. Its rail tracks are Dual gauge which provide both Metre gauge and Broad gauge. Therefore, Broad gauge trains from Rajshahi, Khulna and the Maitree Express can stop at that station easily. The station has two platforms.

In 2014 railways authorities demolished illegally built structures in the parking lot.
