= Narayanganj Commuter =

Commuter train service in Bangladesh

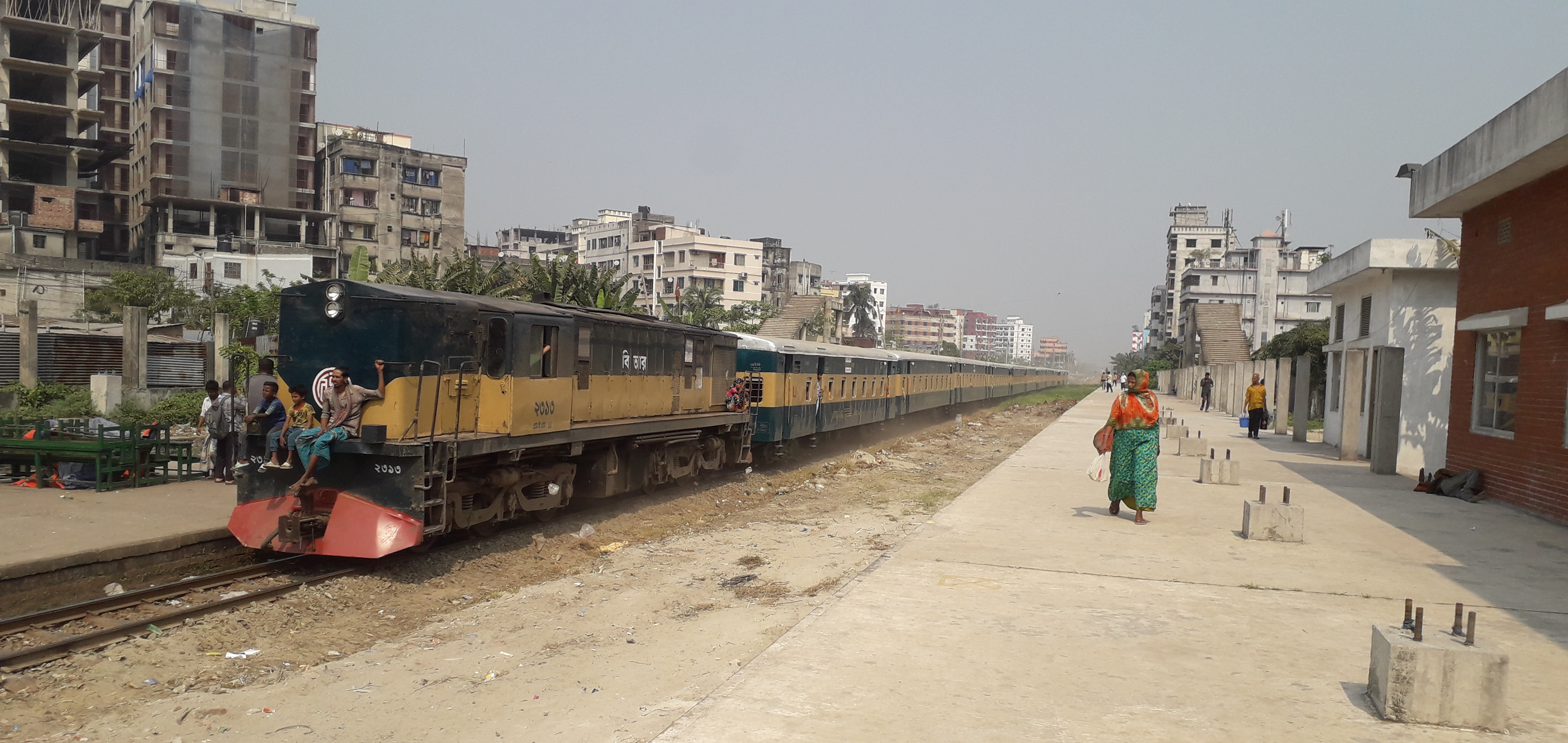
- Narayanganj Commuter train was entering Chashara Railway Station

Overview
- Service type: Commuter
- System: Bangladesh Railway
- Status: Operational
- Locale: Dhaka Division, Bangladesh
- Predecessor: Narayanganj Local
- First service: 23 April 2013; 12 years ago
- Current operator(s): East Zone

Route
- Termini: Kamalapur; Narayanganj
- Stops: 7 in both directions
- Distance travelled: 20 km (12 mi)
- Average journey time: 45 mins
- Service frequency: Daily
- Train number(s): Narayanganj Commuter-1 to 16

Technical
- Track gauge: 1,000 mm (3 ft 3 3/8 in)
- Operating speed: 40 km/h (25 mph)
- Track owner(s): Ministry of Railways

The Narayanganj Commuter (Bengali: নারায়ণগঞ্জ কমিউটার) is a commuter train service operated by Bangladesh Railway. The service operates trains daily between the cities of Dhaka and Narayanganj in Dhaka Division, Bangladesh.

== History ==
Bangladesh Railway long aimed to introduce a commuter train service to facilitate quicker travel for the working population of Narayanganj to and from Dhaka. Shortly after the arrival of DEMU trains from China, Prime Minister Sheikh Hasina inaugurated the Narayanganj Commuter service at Kamalapur railway station on 24 April 2013.

The train service was suspended on 4 December 2022 for work on the Dhaka–Jessore line and resumed on 1 August 2023 after work on the Dhaka section.

== Service ==
After inauguration, the route operated two newer CRRC Tangshan DEMU rakes, each comprising six coaches, alongside eight pairs of older commuter trains. However, following the phasing out of the DEMU trains, only the older meter-gauge trains remain in service.

The service operates 16 departures daily, with the earliest departure from Kamalapur at 5:00 am (+6) and the last departure from Narayanganj at 9:35 pm (+6).

== Route ==
1. Kamalapur railway station
2. Gandaria railway station
3. Shyampur Baraitala railway station
4. Pagla Halt railway station
5. Fatulla railway station
6. Chashara railway station
7. Narayanganj railway station

== Incidents ==
Shortly after the inauguration of the route in 2013, frustrated passengers vandalised the new DEMU coaches due to their shortcomings.

On 24 September 2020, while traveling from Kamalapur to Narayanganj, the train was halted due to derailment of four coaches. As a result, the schedule of Narayanganj Commuter had to be adjusted that day.
