= Kamalapur Multimodal Transport Hub =

Proposed transport hub in Dhaka, Bangladesh

Kamalapur কমলাপুর

General information
- Location: Motijheel Thana; Dhaka; Bangladesh
- Coordinates: 23°43′55″N 90°25′34″E
- System: Transport hub
- Owner: Road Transport and Highways Division
- Operator: Dhaka Transport Coordination Authority
- Connections: High-speed railway; Bangladesh Railway; Dhaka Metro Rail; BRT Depot; Elevated Expressway

Construction
- Parking: Yes
- Cycle facilities: Yes
- Accessible: Yes

Services
| Preceding station | Bangladesh Railway | Following station |
|---|---|---|
| Gendaria towards Narayanganj | Narayanganj–Bahadurabad Ghat | Tejgaon towards Bahadurabad Ghat |
| Terminus | Dhaka–Jessore | Gendaria towards Rupdia or Singia Junction |
| Preceding station | Dhaka Metro | Following station |
|---|---|---|
| Rajarbagh towards Dhaka Airport or Purbachal Terminal | MRT Line 1 | Terminus |
| Arambagh towards Gabtoli | MRT Line 2 | Mugda towards Narayanganj |
| Terminus | MRT Line 4 | Sayedabad towards Madanpur |
| Motijheel towards Uttara North | MRT Line 6 | Terminus |
Location

Kamalapur Multimodal Transport Hub (Bengali: কমলাপুর মাল্টিমোডাল পরিবহন হাব) is a proposed transport hub in Dhaka, capital of Bangladesh. It will be a large structure with three levels around the station plaza of Dhaka railway station which is the central railway station of the country.

== Background ==
In 2013, the government of Bangladesh formulated a policy aimed at coordinating multimodal transportation in the country. Two years later the Strategic Transport Plan was finalized which recommended the construction of 21 transport hubs in Dhaka Division. Kamalapur was one of the proposed transport hubs. In 2018, the Cabinet Committee on Economic Affairs approved the Kamalapur Multimodal Transport Hub construction project. Bangladesh signed an agreement with Japan on the basis of public–private partnership for the implementation of the project. The cost of construction of this proposed structure surrounding the Dhaka railway station was estimated at US$0.9 billion. Kajima was appointed for the construction of the hub who held several meetings with the government to implement the project. The proposed transport hub was planned to be 100 million square meters and modeled after Tokyo Central station in Japan. A conceptual design for the proposed transport hub was prepared in 2019. Later its construction cost further increased. The World Bank agreed to lend US$1.09 billion for the project. Construction of the transport hub required shifting of the inland container depot located next to the railway station at Kamalapur. Hence the government decided to shift it near Dhirasram railway station. The transport hub is targeted to be completed by 2030. Public-Private Partnership Authority appointed Bangladesh University of Engineering and Technology as the transaction advisor for this project but after not getting satisfactory report, it decided to appoint a new transaction advisor. Subsequently, an Indian joint venture firm was appointed through call bidding as the new transaction advisor. On 19 August 2026, a meeting of the Cabinet Committee on government purchase decided to appoint a consulting firm to conduct a feasibility study and prepare the design for the construction.
