= Banani railway station =

Railway station in Dhaka, Bangladesh

Banani বনানী

General information
- Location: Dhaka; Bangladesh
- Coordinates: 23°47′44″N 90°24′03″E
- Elevation: 14 m (46 ft)
- Owner: Bangladesh Railway
- Line: Narayanganj–Bahadurabad Ghat line
- Tracks: Dual Gauge

Construction
- Structure type: Standard (on ground station)

Other information
- Status: Functioning
- Station code: BNNI
- Zone(s): East Zone
- Division(s): Dhaka

History
- Opened: 18 November 1973

Services
Preceding station	Bangladesh Railway	Following station
Tejgaon towards Narayanganj	Narayanganj–Bahadurabad Ghat	Dhaka Cantonment towards Bahadurabad Ghat
Location

Banani Railway Station is a railway station located in Banani, Dhaka District, Bangladesh. No intercity trains stop at the platformless Banani railway station except for certain number of mail express. But from now all intercity train tickets are sold in advance.
