= Tejgaon railway station =

Railway station in Dhaka District, Bangladesh

Tejgaon তেজগাঁও
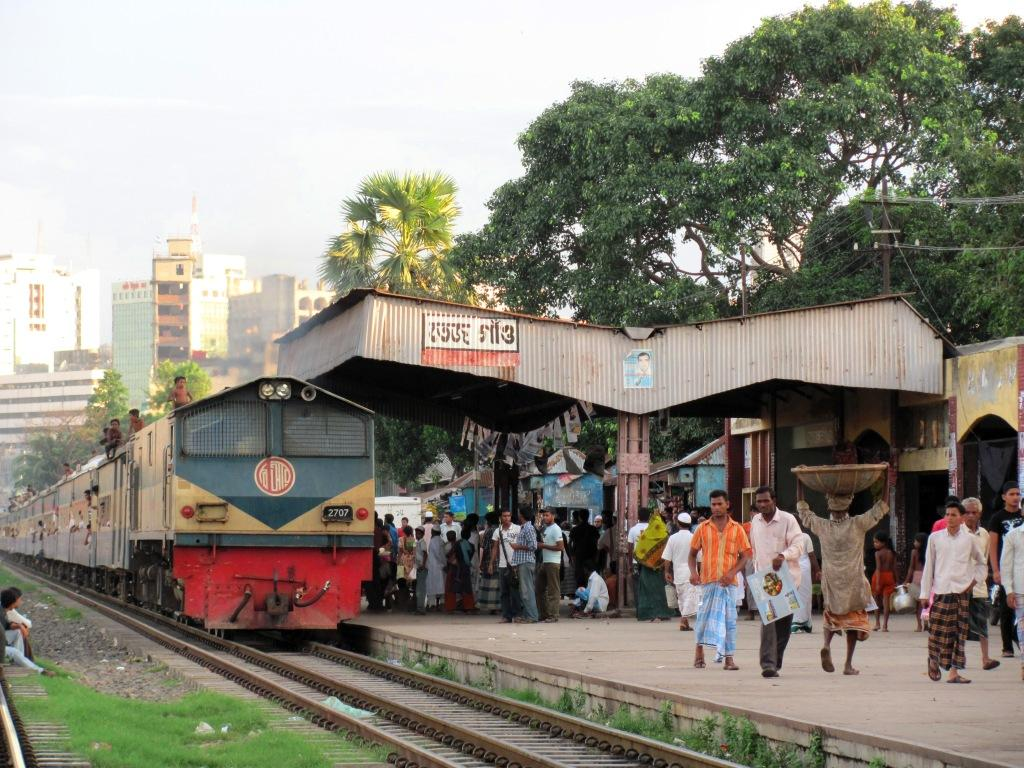
- Tejgaon Railway Station, Dhaka

General information
- Location: Dhaka; Bangladesh
- Coordinates: 23°45′37″N 90°23′41″E
- Elevation: 14 m (46 ft)
- Owner: Bangladesh Railway
- Line: Narayanganj–Bahadurabad Ghat line
- Distance: 4 km from Banani; 5 km from Kamalapur
- Platforms: 1
- Tracks: Dual Gauge

Construction
- Structure type: Standard (on ground station)

Other information
- Status: Functioning
- Station code: TJN
- Zone(s): East Zone
- Division(s): Dhaka

History
- Former names: Assam Bengal Railway (1884–1947); Pakistan Eastern Railway (1947–1971)

Services
Preceding station	Bangladesh Railway	Following station
Kamalapur towards Narayanganj	Narayanganj–Bahadurabad Ghat	Banani towards Bahadurabad Ghat
Location

Tejgaon Railway Station is a railway station in Bangladesh located in Tejgaon Thana, Dhaka District.

== Structures ==
The station has a platform. The platform is open from almost all sides. There is a 15-seat restroom (second class) for passengers. There are a total of three ticketing counters, two for men and one for women and passengers with special needs.

== Criticism ==
Tejgaon railway station is often criticized for its poor infrastructure, lack of adequate manpower, polluted environment and lack of security. According to media reports, most of the robberies on moving trains occur in the Tejgaon railway station area.

== Accident ==
- 6 October 2019: A Noakhali-bound train from Dhaka derailed near Tejgaon railway station at 4:40 pm (UTC+6). However, there were no casualties.
