= Shyampur Baraitala railway station =

Railway station in Dhaka, Bangladesh

Shyampur Baraitala শ্যামপুর বড়ইতলা
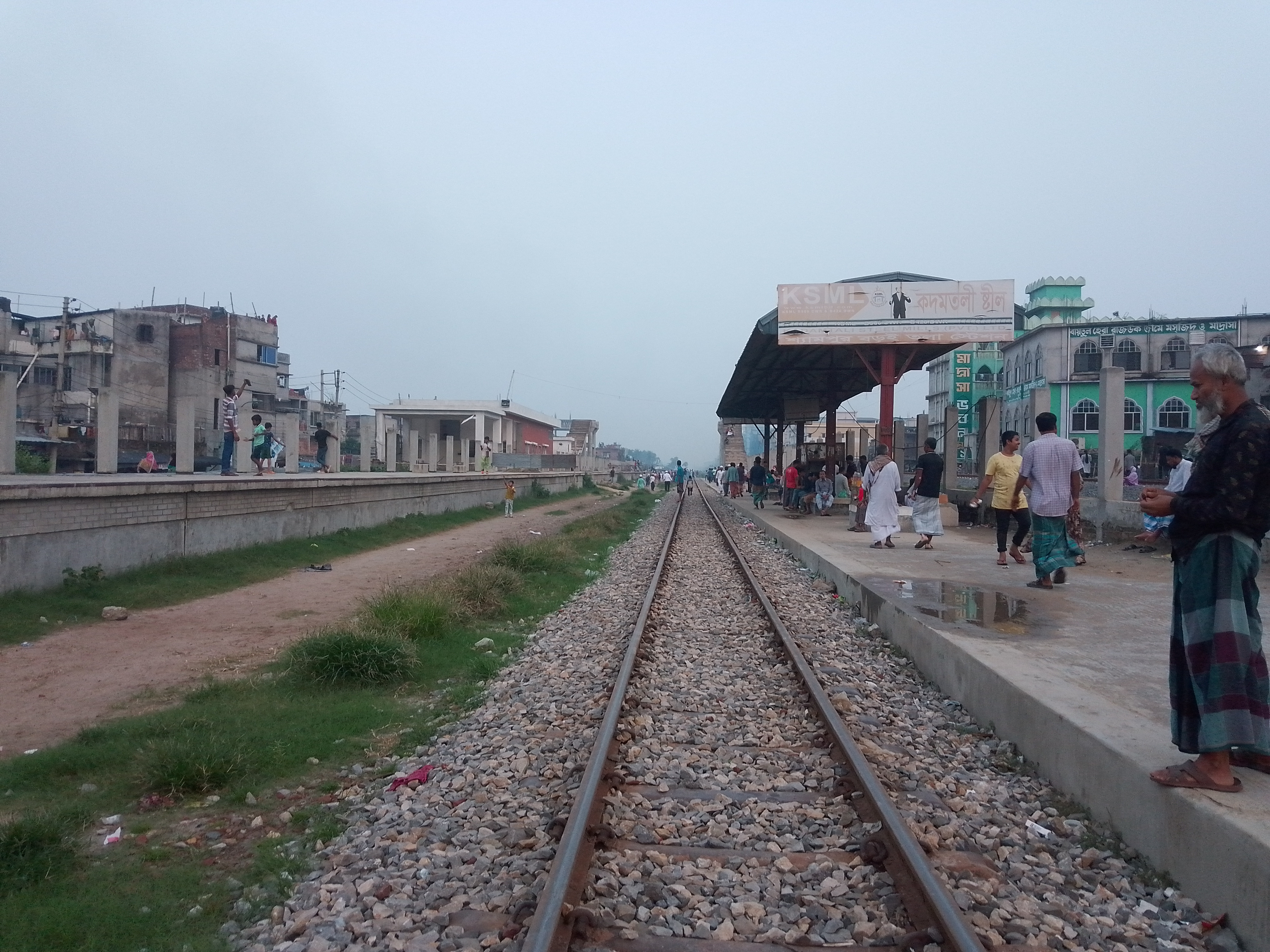

General information
- Location: Dhaka; Bangladesh
- Coordinates: 23°41′05″N 90°26′33″E
- Owner: Bangladesh Railway
- Line: Narayanganj–Bahadurabad Ghat line
- Tracks: Dual Gauge

Construction
- Structure type: Standard (on ground station)

Other information
- Status: Functioning
- Station code: SHBR
- Zone(s): East Zone
- Division(s): Dhaka

History
- Opened: 2017

Services
Preceding station	Bangladesh Railway	Following station
Pagla towards Narayanganj	Narayanganj–Bahadurabad Ghat transfer at Gendaria	Gendaria towards Bahadurabad Ghat
Location

Shyampur Baraitala Railway Station is a railway station located in Shyampur Thana, Dhaka District, Bangladesh. It was established in 2017.

== History ==
The demand for jute was increasing all over the world. For the purpose of meeting that growing demand, there was a need for better communication system than the existing communication system to supply jute from Eastern Bengal to Port of Kolkata. Therefore in 1885 a 144 km wide meter gauge railway line named Dhaka State Railway was constructed to bring raw jute to Kolkata mainly by river which connects Mymensingh with Narayanganj. Shyampur Baraitala railway station was built as part of the project during the construction of Narayanganj–Bahadurabad Ghat line.

== Trains ==
Shyampur Baraitla railway station serves trains of Narayanganj Commuter and Narayanganj Local.
