= Fatulla railway station =

Railway station in Narayanganj District, Bangladesh

Fatulla ফতুল্লা

General information
- Location: Narayanganj District; Bangladesh
- Coordinates: 23°39′01″N 90°28′27″E
- Owner: Bangladesh Railway
- Line: Narayanganj–Bahadurabad Ghat line
- Tracks: Metre Gauge

Construction
- Structure type: Standard (on ground station)

Other information
- Status: Functioning
- Station code: FLA
- Zone(s): East Zone
- Division(s): Dhaka

History
- Opened: 1885
- Former names: Assam Bengal Railway (1885–1947); Pakistan Eastern Railway (1947–1971)

Services
Preceding station	Bangladesh Railway	Following station
Chashara towards Narayanganj	Narayanganj–Bahadurabad Ghat	Pagla towards Bahadurabad Ghat
Location

Fatulla Railway Station is a railway station located in Fatulla Union, Narayanganj Sadar Upazila, Narayanganj District, Dhaka Division, Bangladesh.

== History ==
The demand for jute was increasing all over the world. For the purpose of meeting that growing demand, there was a need for better communication system than the existing communication system to supply jute from Eastern Bengal to Port of Kolkata. Therefore in 1885 a 144 km wide meter gauge railway line named Dhaka State Railway was constructed to bring raw jute to Kolkata mainly by river which connects Mymensingh with Narayanganj. Fatulla railway station was built as part of the project during the construction of Narayanganj–Bahadurabad Ghat line.
