= Kamalapur railway station =

Railway station in Dhaka, Bangladesh

Dhaka Railway Station ঢাকা রেলওয়ে স্টেশন
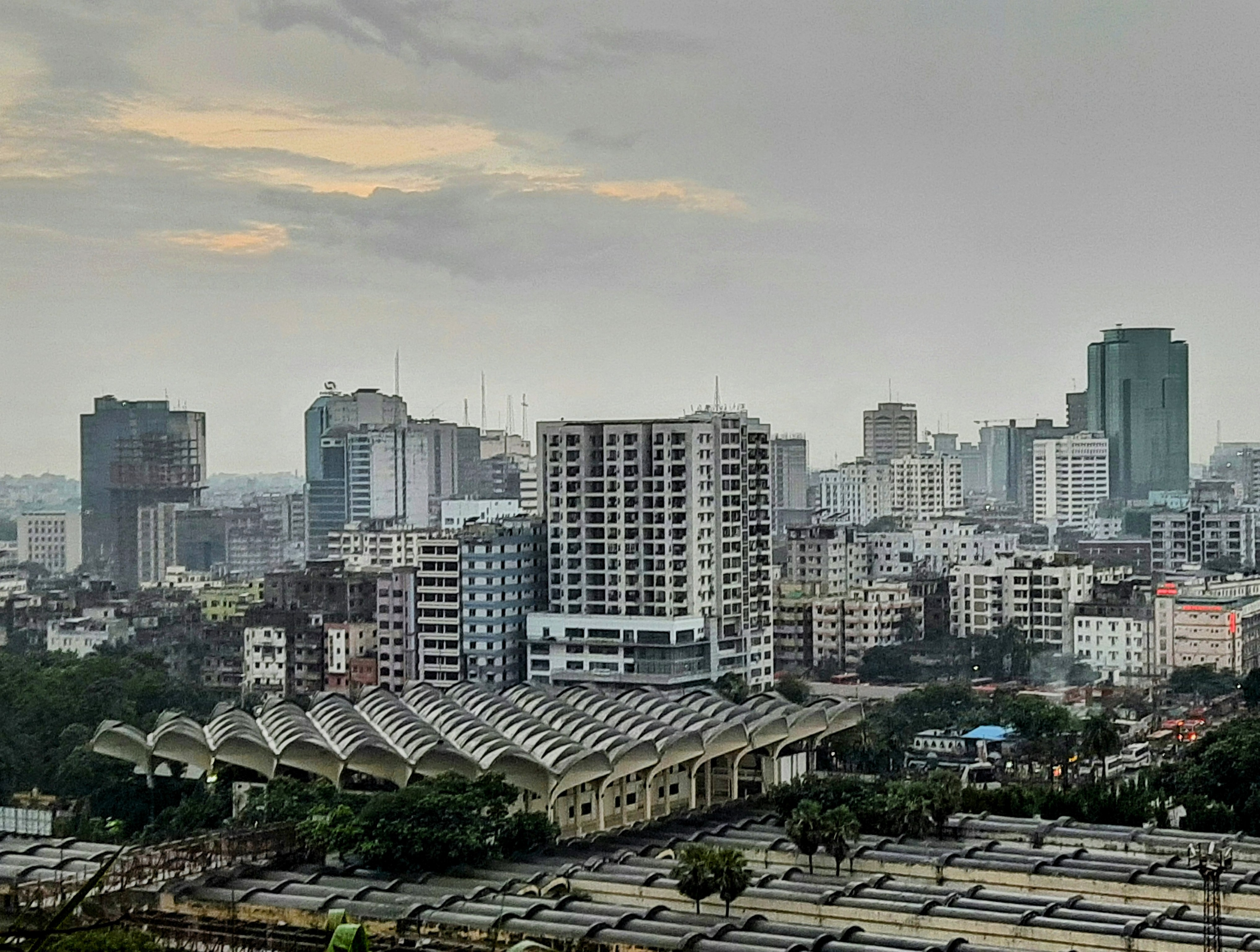
- View of the station plaza from the south

General information
- Other names: Kamalapur Railway Station
- Location: Outer Circular Road, Kamalapur, Motijheel Thana, Dhaka; Bangladesh
- Coordinates: 23°43′55″N 90°25′34″E
- Elevation: 12 metres (39 ft)
- System: Central station
- Owner: Bangladesh Railway
- Operator: East Zone
- Lines: Narayanganj–Bahadurabad Ghat line; Dhaka–Jessore line
- Distance: 4 km from Gendaria; 5 km from Tejgaon
- Platforms: 11
- Tracks: 15
- Connections: Bus stand; MRT Line 1; MRT Line 2; MRT Line 4; MRT Line 6

Construction
- Structure type: Standard (on ground station)
- Parking: Yes
- Cycle facilities: Yes
- Accessible: Disabled access Computerized Ticketing Counters Luggage Checking System Food Plaza Kiosks WC Taxi Stand Public Transportation Metro interchange
- Architect: Daniel Dunham; Robert Boughey
- Architectural style: Neo-Islamic Chala

Other information
- Status: Functioning
- Station code: DA
- Zone(s): East Zone
- Division(s): Dhaka
- Classification: A class

History
- Opened: 1 May 1968; 58 years ago
- Original company: Pakistan Eastern Railway

Key dates
- 1960–1965: Construction
- 27 April 1968: Inauguration
- 11 April 1987: Inland container depot

Passengers
- 2022: est. 41,975,000
Services
Preceding station	Bangladesh Railway	Following station
Gendaria towards Narayanganj	Narayanganj–Bahadurabad Ghat	Tejgaon towards Bahadurabad Ghat
Terminus	Dhaka–Jessore	Gendaria towards Rupdia or Singia Junction
Route map
Narayanganj–Bahadurabad Ghat
- Source
Dhaka–Jessore
- Source
Location
- Location within Dhaka Location within Dhaka division Location within Bangladesh
- Interactive map

Kamalapur Railway Station, officially Dhaka Railway Station, is the central railway station in Kamalapur, Dhaka, capital of Bangladesh. It is the largest station and the busiest infrastructure for transportation in the country that acts as a gateway to the country's capital. It was opened on 1 May 1968.

It was built during the Pakistan period, but its railway line was built during the British period. After the creation of Pakistan, another railway station was constructed at Kamalapur as the old railway station in Dhaka was inadequate, and a part of the existing railway line was moved from the previous position. Built in 1968, this railway station was witness to the massacre that took place during the liberation war in 1971.

After the liberation, the country's first inland container depot was established here. After that, several proposals and decisions were made to relocate and demolish the station building, but due to objections from the authorities and dignitaries, it was not done. A multimodal transport hub around the station is currently under construction, which is expected to be completed by 2030.

This station is plagued with various issues. Among them are homeless people, the height of platforms, insecurity, criminal activities, reluctance of passengers to use foot overbridges, the problem of railway porters, and unavailability of information. This central railway station of the country has 8 platforms. Apart from this, there are various facilities including a hospital, mosque, and police station.

== History ==
=== Pre-independence era ===
==== Predecessor ====
In 1885, when Bangladesh was under the British Raj, the Dacca State Railway built the Narayanganj–Bahadurabad Ghat line and opened its part for train service from the old city of Dacca (now Dhaka) to Narayanganj. In 1895, Dacca railway station (also known as Fulbaria railway station) was built with other facilities. It was established on the south side of the then main city of Dhaka. In the same year, railway connections from Dhaka to Narayanganj and Dhaka to Mymensingh were established. After the partition of India and the creation of Pakistan in 1947, Dhaka became the main city and capital of East Bengal (later East Pakistan). In that time, the railway line used to go straight from Tejgaon railway station to Fulbaria.

==== Establishment ====
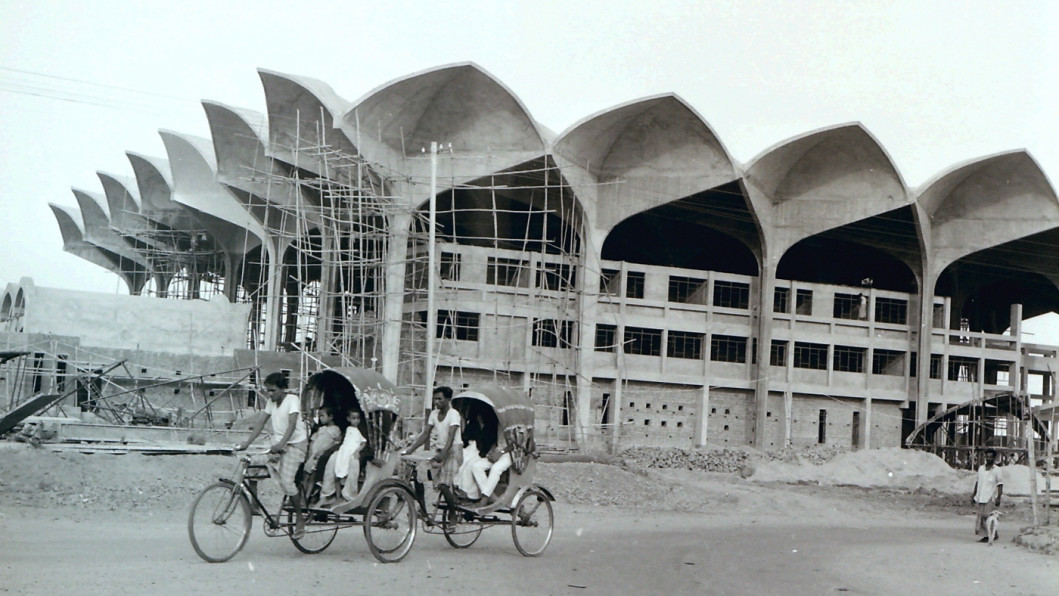
Kamalapur railway station during construction

Dhaka's urban status grew in the early 20th century, and so did its economy, especially after the partition of India and independence of Pakistan in 1947. The existing railway lines extended northwards, bisecting Dhaka into old and new cities, and these railway lines intersected with roads at various points, blocking the flow of north–south road traffic. Also, the old Dacca railway station on the northern side of the city was incomplete, consisting of a platform, a small yard, and a locomotive shed. Relocating the station to a less congested area is expected to facilitate unhindered north–south vehicular flow, and also bring old and new Dhaka cities together. In 1948, experts suggested shifting the station to Kamalapur. In 1952, a plan to shift the railway station outside the city area was made. It was also planned to build a new railway line from Tejgaon to Gandaria. However, due to the fund shortage, the plan wasn't executed that time. After 10 years of the suggestion on 20 December 1958, the provincial government finalized to construct the new railway station in Kamalapur with the deadline of 1964. The initial budget for its construction was Rs. 45.6 million (equivalent to Rs. 230 million or US$830,000 in 2021), of which the provincial government was supposed to provide about 60%. In 1960, the provincial government took "Dacca realignment scheme" which included a new station in Kamalapur and a new track from Tejgaon to Gandaria. The government planned to acquired lands in Kamalapur for the new station building. However, due to litigation issues, the acquisition plan was stopped till 1964. On the other hand, the new railway track was successfully built in 1962. From Tejgaon, the railway line was diverted to Khilgaon, and then to Kamalapur. The operational elements and logistics of the old Dacca railway station were transferred to the new railway station in 1965. On 1 February 1966, goods transport services started from the incomplete station. On 1 May 1966, the station became partially operation for passenger train services by Dhaka–Mymensingh passenger, Dhaka–Narayanganj local and Sundarban Express. The station was inaugurated by East Pakistani governor Abdul Monem Khan on 27 April 1968. Pakistani president Ayub Khan was at the inauguration ceremony. Its construction cost was Rs. 135 million (equivalent to Rs. 690 million or US$2.5 million in 2021). A year after that, the headquarters of the railway mail service of the province was moved here.

=== Post-independence era ===
==== Recent developments ====
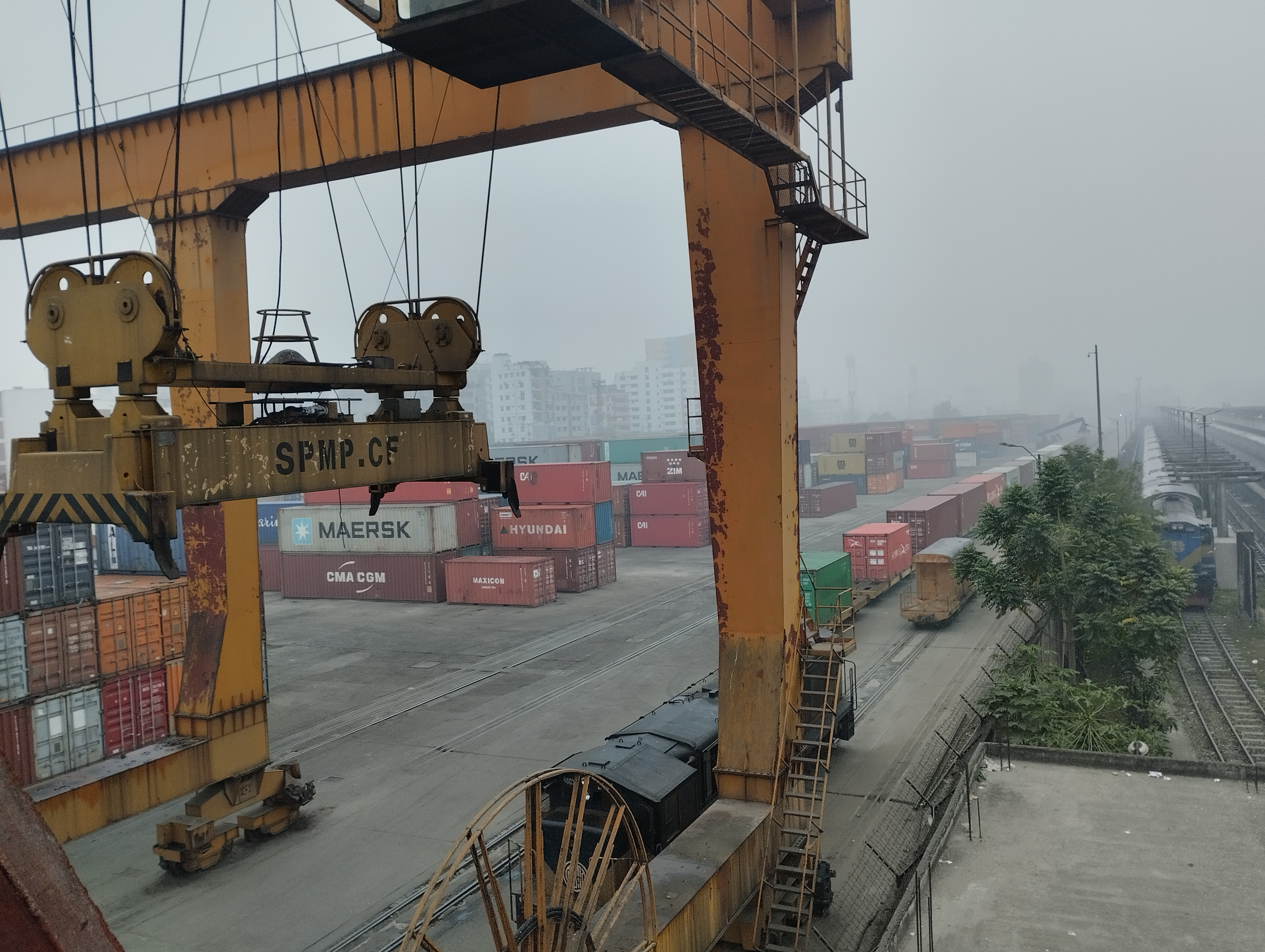
Inland container depot

On 11 April 1987, after sixteen years of the independence of Bangladesh, the first inland container depot in Bangladesh was opened in the railway station. In 2005, American consultancy firm Louis Berger Group prepared a strategic transport plan (STP) for Dhaka. The STP suggested the relocation of the central railway station to Tongi, but the steering committee, formed by the Dhaka Transport Coordination Board, rejected the suggestion. In the 2010s, the government proposed to shift the railway station to Gazipur District. But the Ministry of Railways opposed the proposal, considering the inconvenience to the city dwellers. The station building underwent renovation four times between 2013 and 2023.

Under the construction project of the Dhaka–Jessore line, which started in 2016, it was decided to renovate six railway stations, which included Kamalapur railway station. In 2020, a government meeting held at the Railway Bhaban in Dhaka informed that as part of the renovation work, three new dual-gauge railway lines and a new platform for the station's broad-gauge railway line will be constructed at the station.

The Dhaka–Narayanganj section of the existing Narayanganj–Bahadurabad Ghat line has been declared closed from 4 December 2022 for upgrading from meter gauge to dual gauge and the Padma Bridge Rail Link project. The announcement led to the suspension of train services from Kamalapur to Narayanganj railway station, causing suffering to commuters plying the route who used to travel by train to save money. Md. Nurul Islam Sujon, railway minister of the country, had announced on 14 January 2023 that the section would be opened for train traffic by March. But it could not be done, as two projects were not completed. On 25 July 2023, the Railway Minister announced that the Dhaka–Narayanganj section would be reopened on the first day of August. On the final promised day, train services resumed from Kamalapur to Narayanganj.

==== COVID-19 pandemic ====
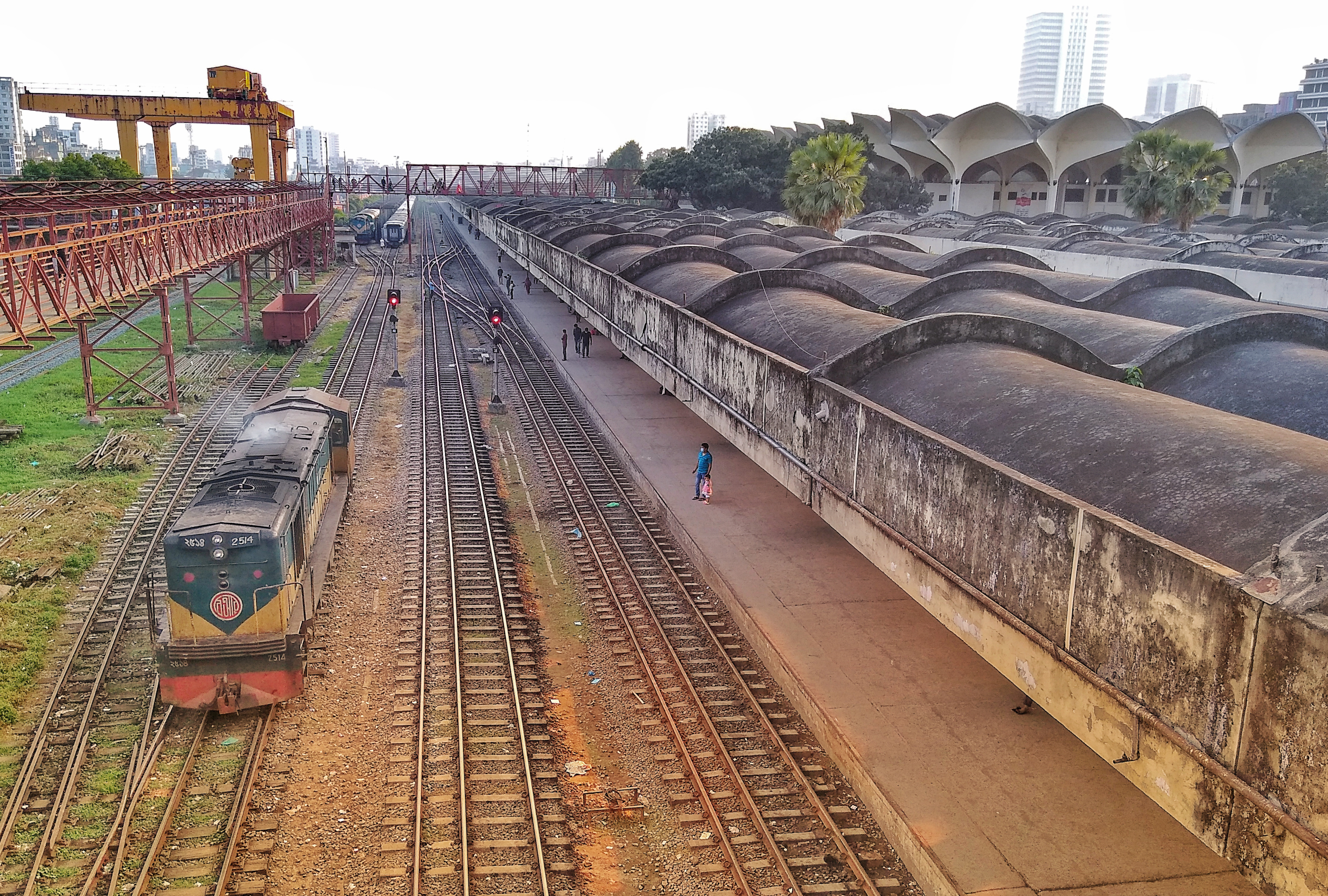
A station platform in 2020

During the COVID-19 pandemic in 2020, train services at Kamalapur railway station were suspended and access to the station was closed. Although the Kamalapur railway station was opened in June, the authority did not arrange additional trains for passengers on the occasion of Eid al-Adha. After the end of the lockdown in 2021, the government mandated online-only ticket sales, leaving the lower classes deprived of using the station. On the other hand, they could not travel sitting on the roof of the train, as they were not allowed to enter the station without a ticket. After the second phase of lockdown, Kamalapur railway station was opened and rail communication resumed. In early 2022, new restrictions were imposed on the railway station as a result of the SARS-CoV-2 Omicron variant, and ticket sales were halved. It faced disaster due to the overcrowding of passengers due to the ban on the use of motorcycles on the highways and outside of the district by the government around Eid-ul-Azha of the same year. As a result, its train schedule was disrupted.

==== Multimodal transport hub ====
In 2018, a public-private joint investment (PPP) project with Kajima was approved to create a multimodal hub around Dhaka Airport and Tejgaon railway station along with Kamalapur Railway Station. Under this infrastructure will be built around Kamalapur Railway Station; there will be multi-storied residential buildings, hotels, shopping malls, subways, and runways. In 2019, the Bangladesh Railway authority objected to the construction of a multimodal hub in front of the station building. In 2020, Bangladesh Railway and Dhaka Mass Transit Company Limited decided to connect Kamalapur railway station with MRT Line 6 of Dhaka Metro Rail. But as the current station could not match the proposed route of MRT Line 6, it was decided to demolish the Kamalapur station and construct a new one 130 meters north. Various architects and individuals of the country opposed this decision. On 30 January 2021, the Prime Minister's Office gave permission to demolish the railway station, but in February, the Railway Ministry withdrew its decision to demolish Kamalapur. However, related authorities said that the railway station may be shifted in the near future if required. Instead of demolishing the station, the government plans to construct a station complex for metrorail, subway, elevated express, and bus rapid transit under the railway station area as part of the multimodal hub that is scheduled to be completed by 2030. In 2025, the authorities confirmed that the station would be demolished for the proposed hub.

== Architecture ==
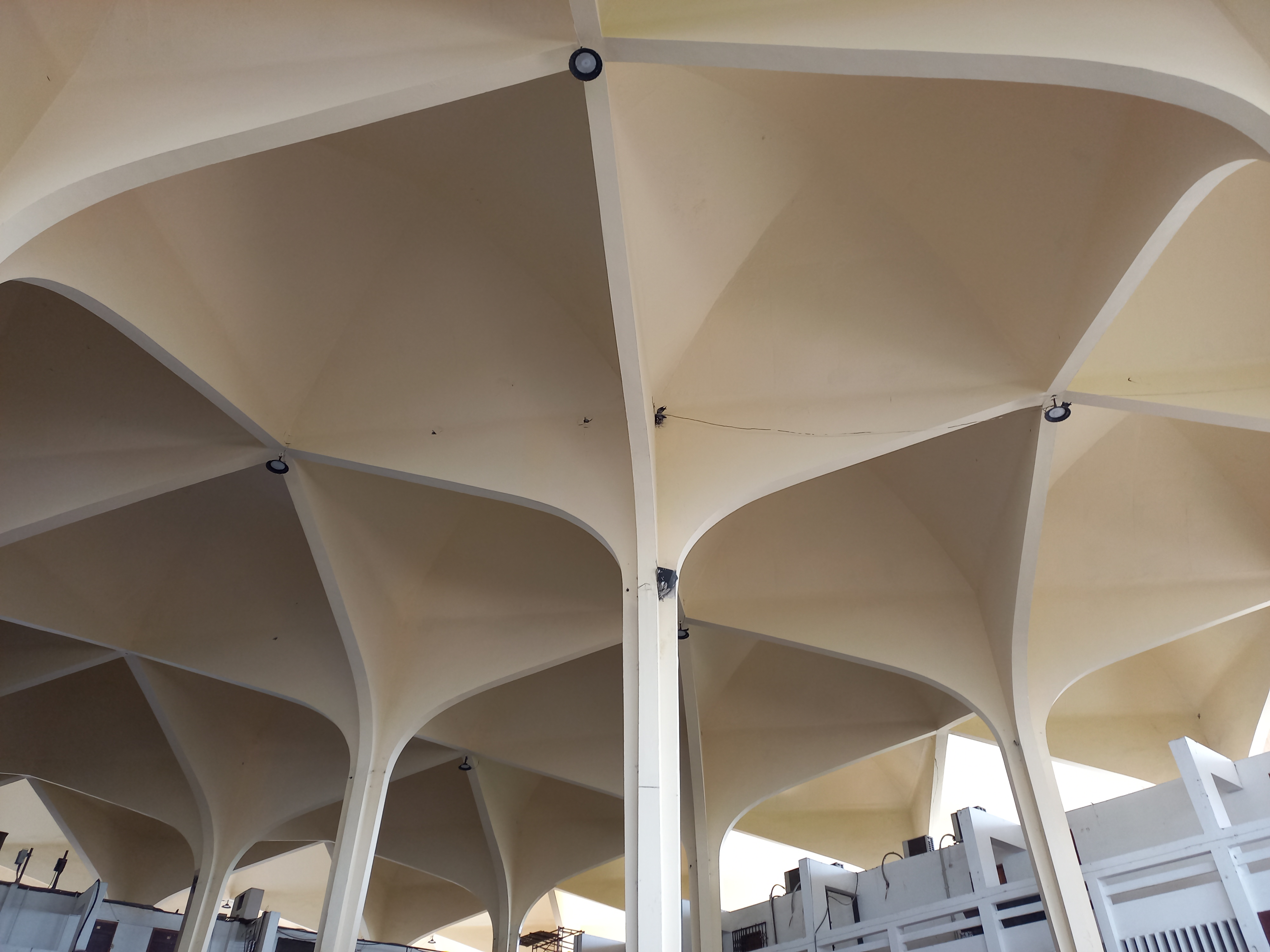
Structure of the station building

The architects of Kamalapur railway station were two Americans: Daniel Dunham and Bob Buie. Both came to East Pakistan as architects with the Louis Berger Group. The design process started under the direction of Dunham, followed by Robert Boughey.

Dunham & Buie's design included the creation of a wide-span structure that would be suitable for the climate of the region, a challenge to them. For that, they designed a concrete structure for the station building roof that was unusual; the structure had a parasol roof. The roof shelters a row of downward-facing interconnected structures. The terminal's profile – a rhythmic arrangement of gently tapered and arched shells evokes the typical image of a tropical climate, with an umbrella providing protection from monsoon rains. The design of the station includes various functional spaces, including the station's ticket booth, administrative offices, passenger rest areas, and waiting areas under an integrated canopy roof.

The entire structure consists of 36 squares. It has a total of 49 columns. Above it stands a roof with 36 slender concrete domes. Each column, 59 feet high, extends four branches upward and supports the roof. The station is spread over an area of 156 acres. It has 11 ticket counters and several passenger rest areas.

A monument called "Suryaketan" was constructed at the entrance of the railway station in 1999 in memory of all the railway officers and employees who were martyred in the 1971 liberation war.

== Accidents and incidents ==
In 1971, the Pakistan Army attacked the Kamalapur railway station soon after Operation Searchlight began. They killed the people in the trains reaching the station and burnt the trains. Also, everyone in the station building was killed by the Pakistani army. About 30 employees working at the railway station died in this massacre.

On 22 June 2009, an incorrect signal caused a head-on collision between Mahanagar Probhati and Isa khan Express. It caused 1 fatality and 40 others to be injured.

On 29 December 2014, Kamalapur railway station was involved in an accident when a train collided with a lorry, resulting in the death of 6 people. On 12 August 2017, around Eid-ul-Azha, 18 persons accused of various crimes were arrested from the railway station during the operation of the railway police station. In January 2019, a fire broke out in the station's control room, disrupting train schedules. On 23 May of the same year, a fire broke out in the station master's room, but it was extinguished with the use of fire extinguishers. On 19 August 2019, a girl was raped and killed in an abandoned compartment of the station. On 23 December 2021, a person was crushed under a train and died due to an accident on the second platform of the terminal.

On 9 January 2022, a points man of the railway station was cut and killed by an approaching train while connecting train carriages. On 23 April of the same year, during a press conference organized by Kamalapur railway station, the belongings of the station master were stolen. Later during the investigation on 18 May, the detective police recovered the stolen items along with the thieves. On 7 May, a cargo container caught fire at the station, which was brought under control by three units of the fire service.

On 7 October, a girl, who was seventeen, was raped in a train on the first platform of the station. The incident involved 6 people who worked as cleaners at the railway terminal. On 20 October 2022, the Rapid Action Battalion arrested a gang of ticket black marketers at Kamalapur railway station, who, since 2015, used to buy station tickets from others and sell them at high prices, creating a shortage of tickets. On 29 December 2022, during the anti-government protest in the country, a railway security guard was killed by the explosion of a crude bomb on its platform.

On Eid-ul-Fitr 2023, it was prohibited to enter the station and travel on the roof of the train without purchasing an advance ticket online. As a result of this decision, tickets are sold out quickly, so some people come to the station plaza to buy tickets before Eid and suffer. So the station counters were not crowded with people waiting for tickets.

On 24 October 2024. Two carriages of the Narayanganj commuter derailed near the southern end of the station at Gopibag at 7:30am.

On 25 October 2024. Five carriages of Panchagarh Express derailed soon after it set off from Kamalapur at around midnight. No one was injured; however, the recovery took 7 hours, and morning trains were delayed by 2 hours.

On 19 March 2025, two carriages of a freight train derailed right before entering the station, stopping railway traffic for more than 90 minutes.

== Station facilities ==
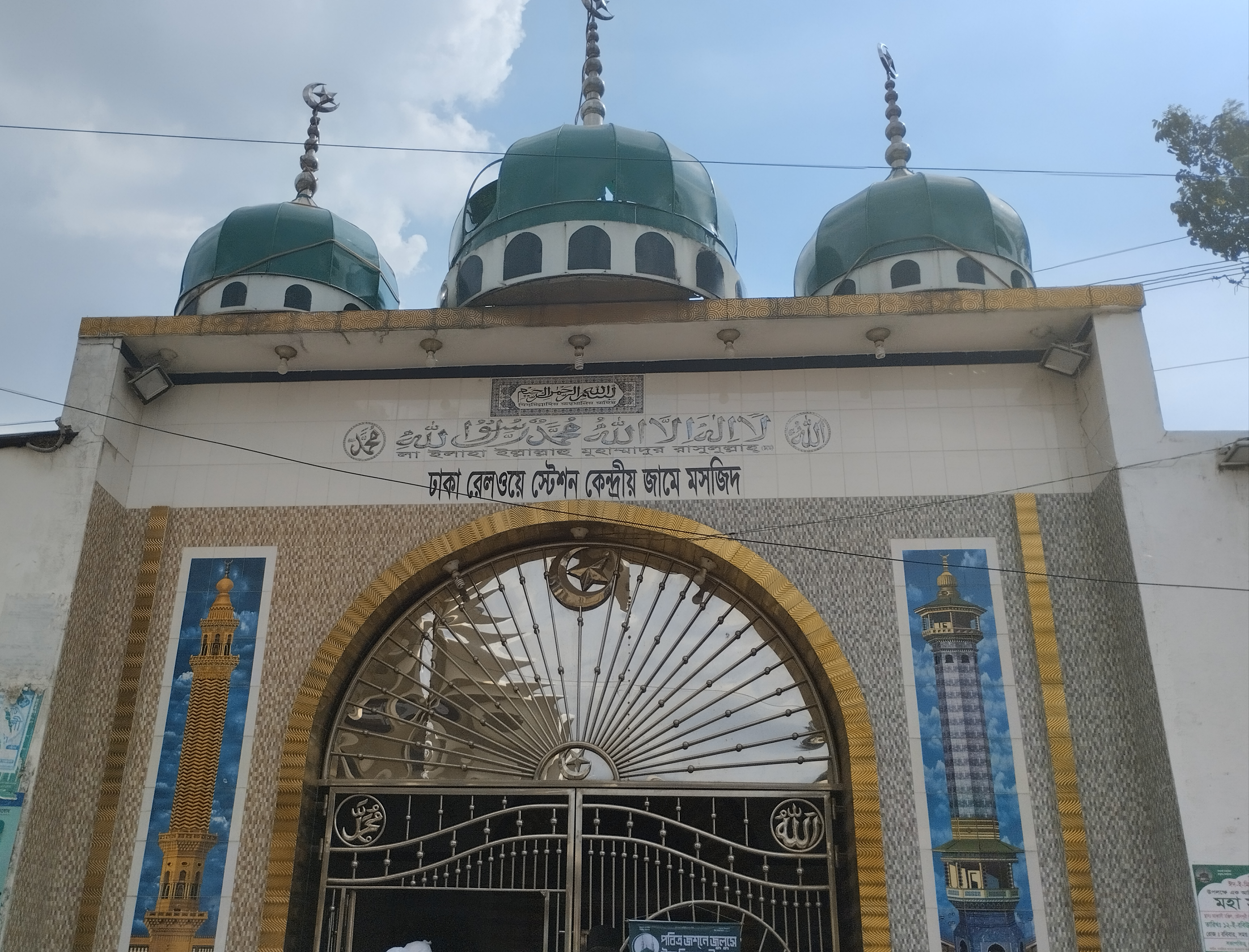
Central Jame Mosque

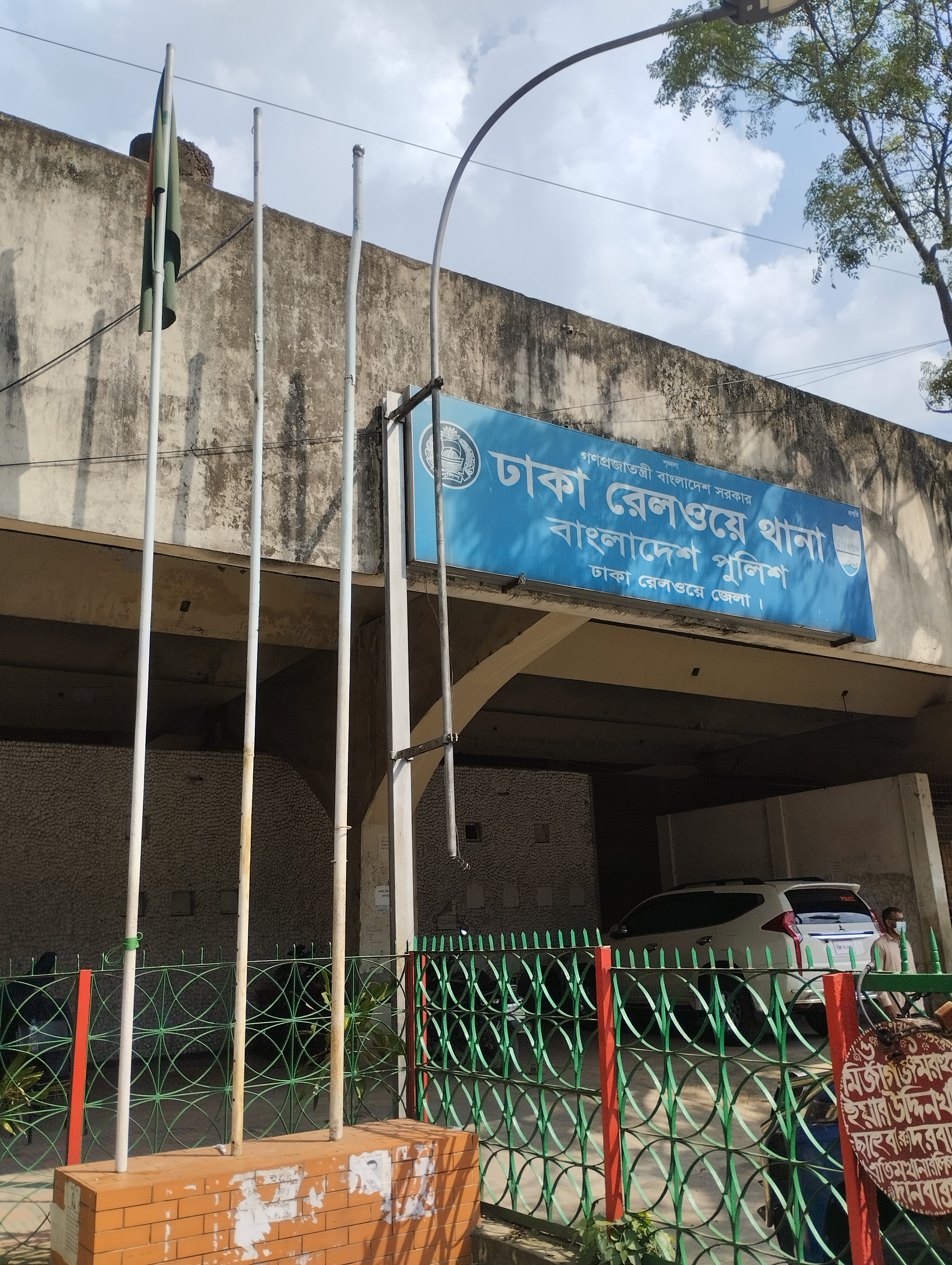
Dhaka railway police station

There are eight 918.4 meter long platforms at this station, numbered 1-8 from the North West to the South East (left to right when viewed from the passenger entrance):

- Platform 1-7 are generally used for commuters, inter-city rail and long-distance services.
- Suburban platform is generally used for suburban services on the Narayanganj–Bahadurabad Ghat line towards Narayanganj.

Kamalapur railway station has a yard of Dhaka Inland Container Depot owned by the authority of the Port of Chittagong. Saif Power Tech Limited was appointed as its operator in 2015. It was built on 32 acres of land near the terminal. It can hold 10 percent of Chittagong Port's 70 percent containers, i.e. 90,000 TEUS.

The Railway General Hospital, Kamalapur was constructed in 1986 on 4.3 acres. The hospital was started to provide medical services to the officers and employees of the Bangladesh Railway. In 2013, the hospital was planned to be taken up in public private partnership and two years later, its services were opened to all and expanded to 100 beds. Its current number of beds is 40.

There is a mosque for passengers use in the station known as the "Dhaka Railway Station Central Jame Mosque". Free food is distributed during iftar every year in the month of Ramadan to those who come to pray at the mosque.

The Railway Police maintains a police station at Kamalapur, with a custody suite. At the station, various accused are arrested in this railway station. The police station was modernized and renovated in 2021. After the renovation, a library and drinking water facilities have been kept here for the prisoners and the police.

== Ridership ==
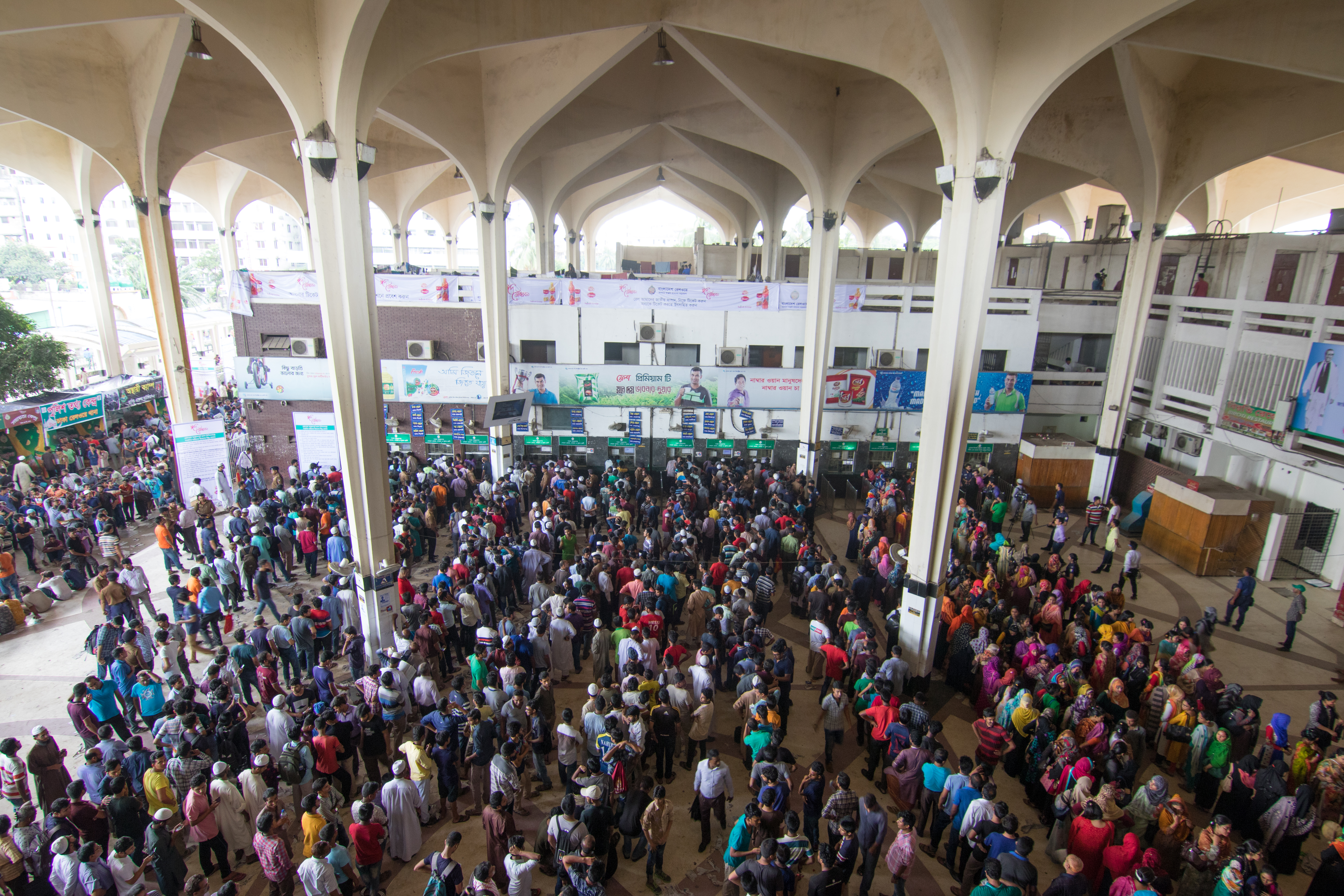
Passengers in the ticket counters of the station before a week of Eid al-Adha, 2017

As of 2022, at least 115,000 passengers travel by train using Kamalapur railway station daily. The railway station is usually crowded with people returning home by train on the occasion of the festivals of Eid al-Fitr and Eid al-Adha every year. However, there was an exception during the year of the COVID-19 pandemic.

== Issues ==
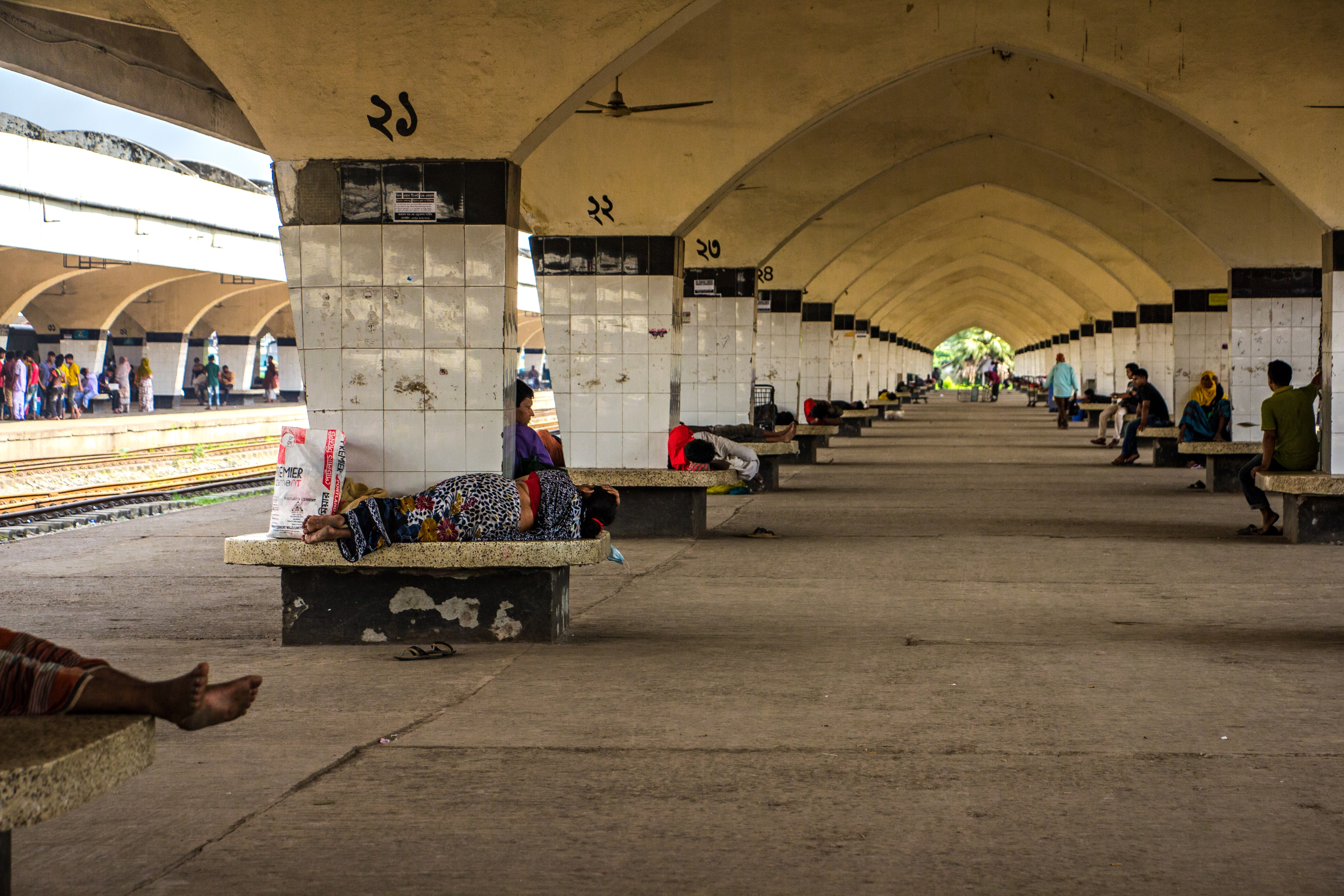
Homeless people at the station

According to the statistics of 2014, the number of homeless people in Dhaka is at least 7 thousand. Many of them live around Kamalapur railway station because of ruthless circumstances and hardship of poverty-stricken life. Today it is one of the refuge of the destitute population in the city. This unguarded railway station building is the target of many criminal activities of vagrants. According to the information of the Detective Branch, various criminals always eagerly wait to commit misdeeds at this railway terminal and hence the station is dangerous for passengers. According to Railway Police data, 86 criminals were arrested from the terminal in 2021. This is also a safe haven for drug dealers. In 2022, Newsbangla24.com reported that there is a lack of security at the terminal and a lack of police personnel can be seen after the evening. The reporter saw some people taking drugs in public and interviewed a porter who revealed that the policemen are removed after 12:00 am. On the other hand, the railway police authority blamed the lack of manpower for the lack of security in the station.

The height of the platforms at Kamalapur railway station is disproportionate to the height of the trains. As all trains in East Pakistan were meter gauge when the railway station was built, the platforms were designed keeping meter gauge trains in mind. As a result, passengers face problems in boarding broad gauge and demu trains from the platforms. In 2021, the station was renovated to raise some of the platforms to address the issue. But after renovating it at a cost of ৳2.7 crore, questions arose about the substandard construction work on those platforms. Although foot overbridges are provided at each platform for movement between the platforms of the station, many passengers walk over the tracks without using them to save time and the station authority does not take any measures to intercept and discourage them.

Most of the displays and schedule boards at the station are non-functional and passengers do not get accurate train information from the police information center at the station. Passengers face the problem of missing station master to get various train related information at the station. The microphone to announce the train schedule at the terminal cannot be heard clearly, leading to confusion. As of 2021, the number of railway porters work in this railway station is 210. To work as a railway porter, permission is required from the railway station authority. A reporter from Jago News 24 reported that bribes are being paid to work as porters here. Besides, it is said that the authority does not take any measures or help to solve the problems of the porters. It is also alleged by passengers that porters charge more than the government fixed rates for carrying goods.

== Legacy ==
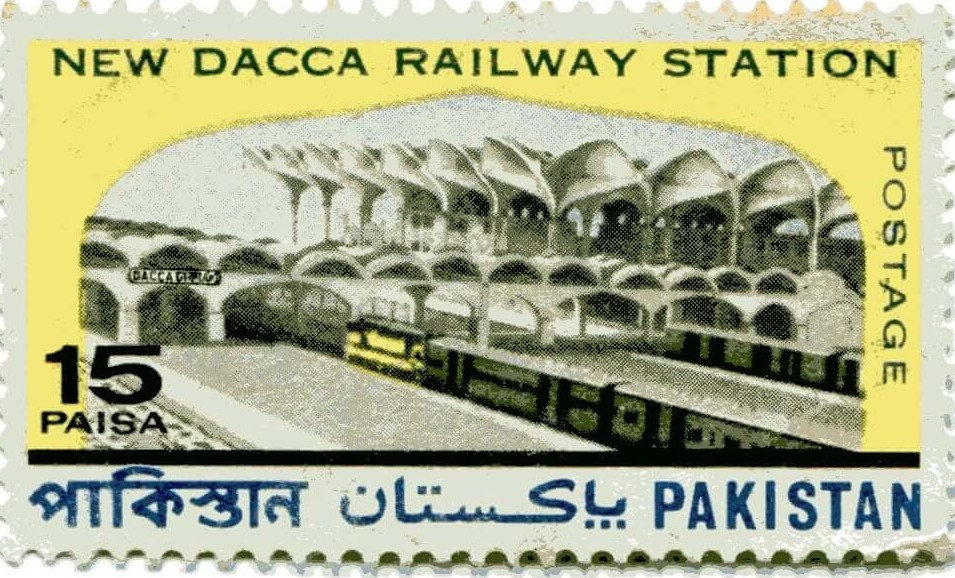
1969 postage stamp of Kamalapur by Pakistan Post

Kamalapur railway station is often featured in films and other pop culture in the country. The station has been used in numerous Bangladeshi film and television productions over the years. Many films and television programs have been filmed at the station, including: Swatta, Fereshte, and Istition.

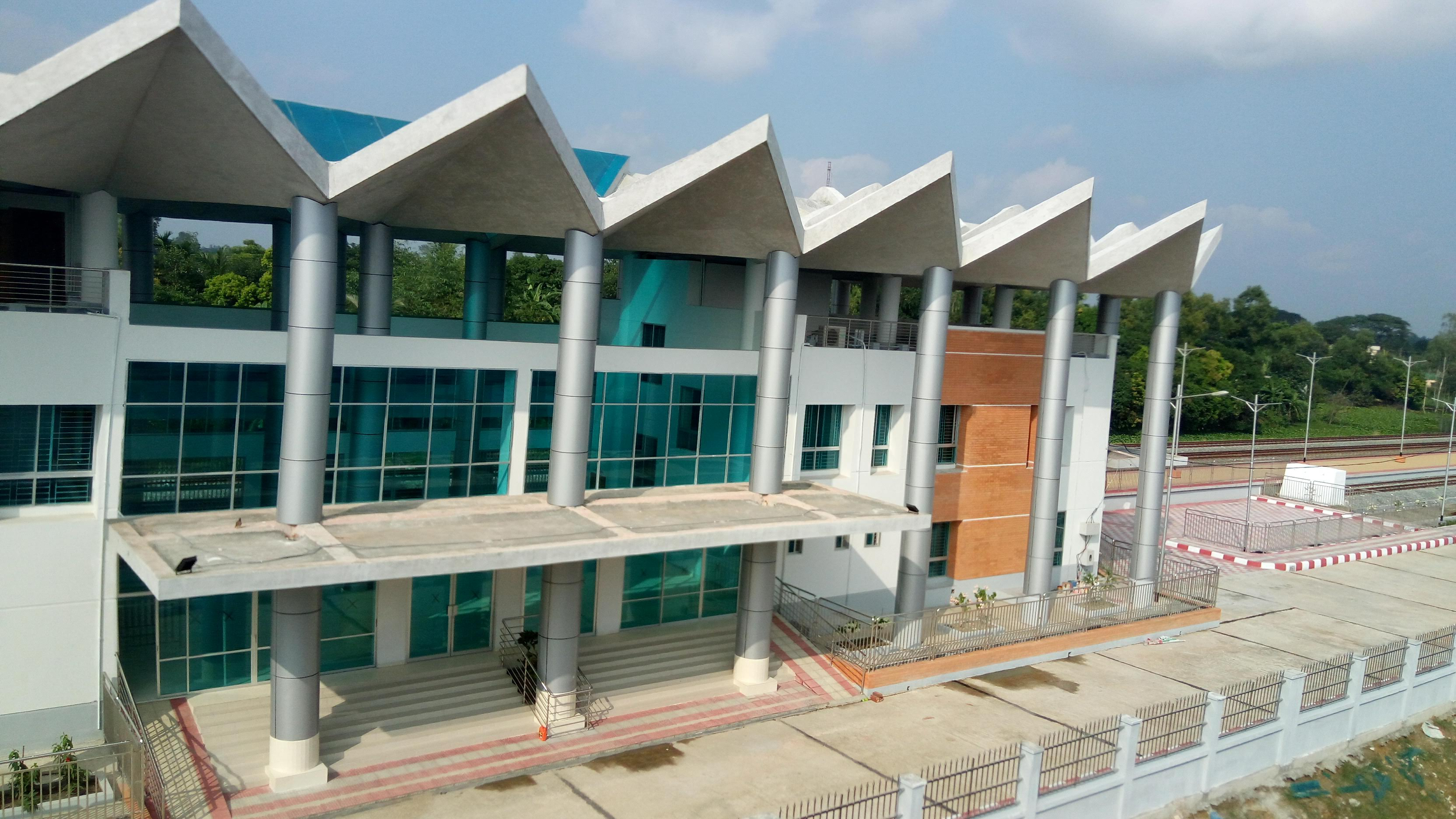
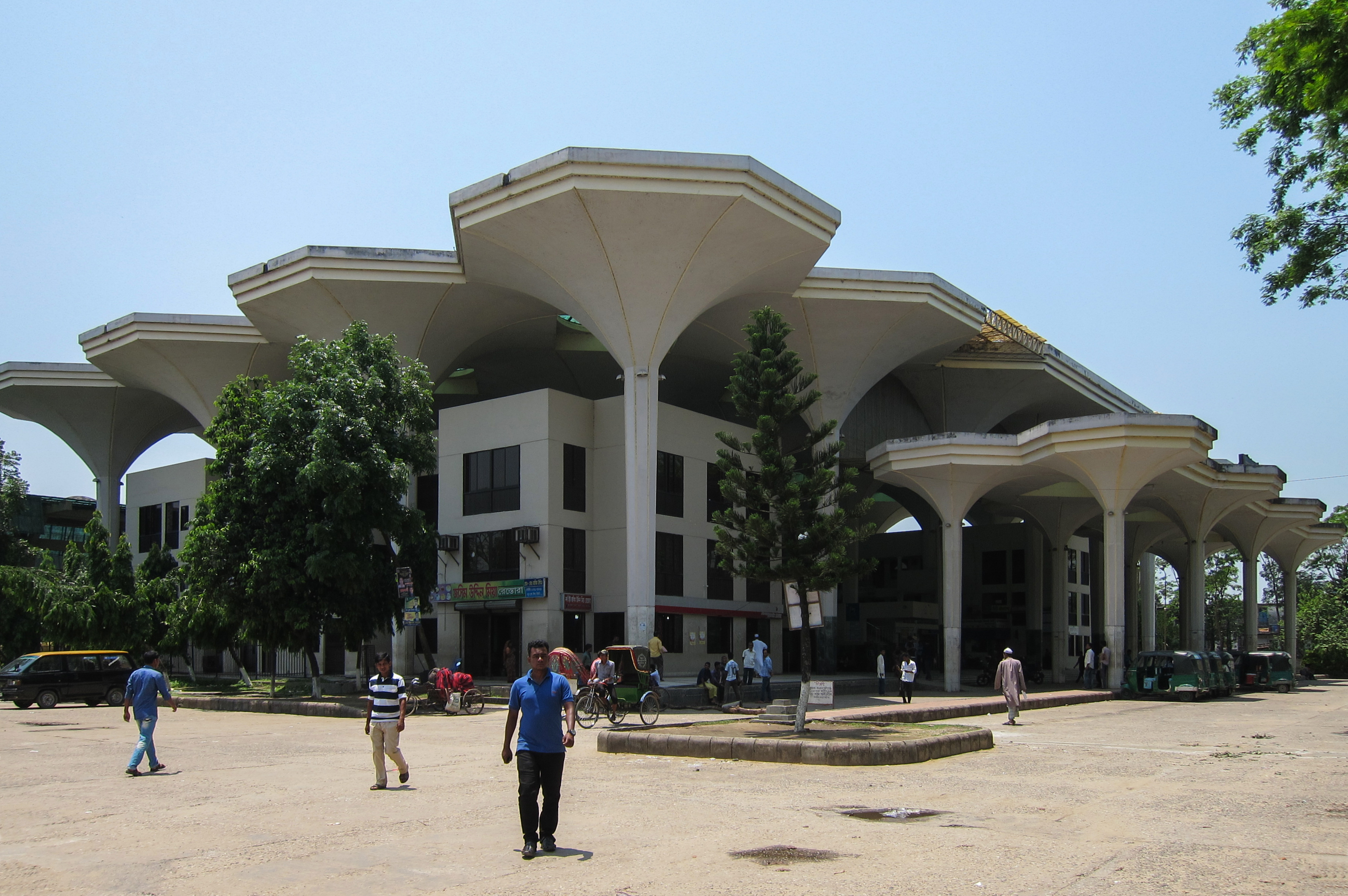
(from left) Kaliakoir Hi-Tech City railway station and Sylhet railway station

The original design of Kaliakoir Hi-Tech City railway station, situated in Kaliakoir Hi-Tech City near Dhaka is designed based on this iconic station. Sylhet railway station, another railway station in the north-eastern region of the country, has similar design structure to this station.

== Gallery ==
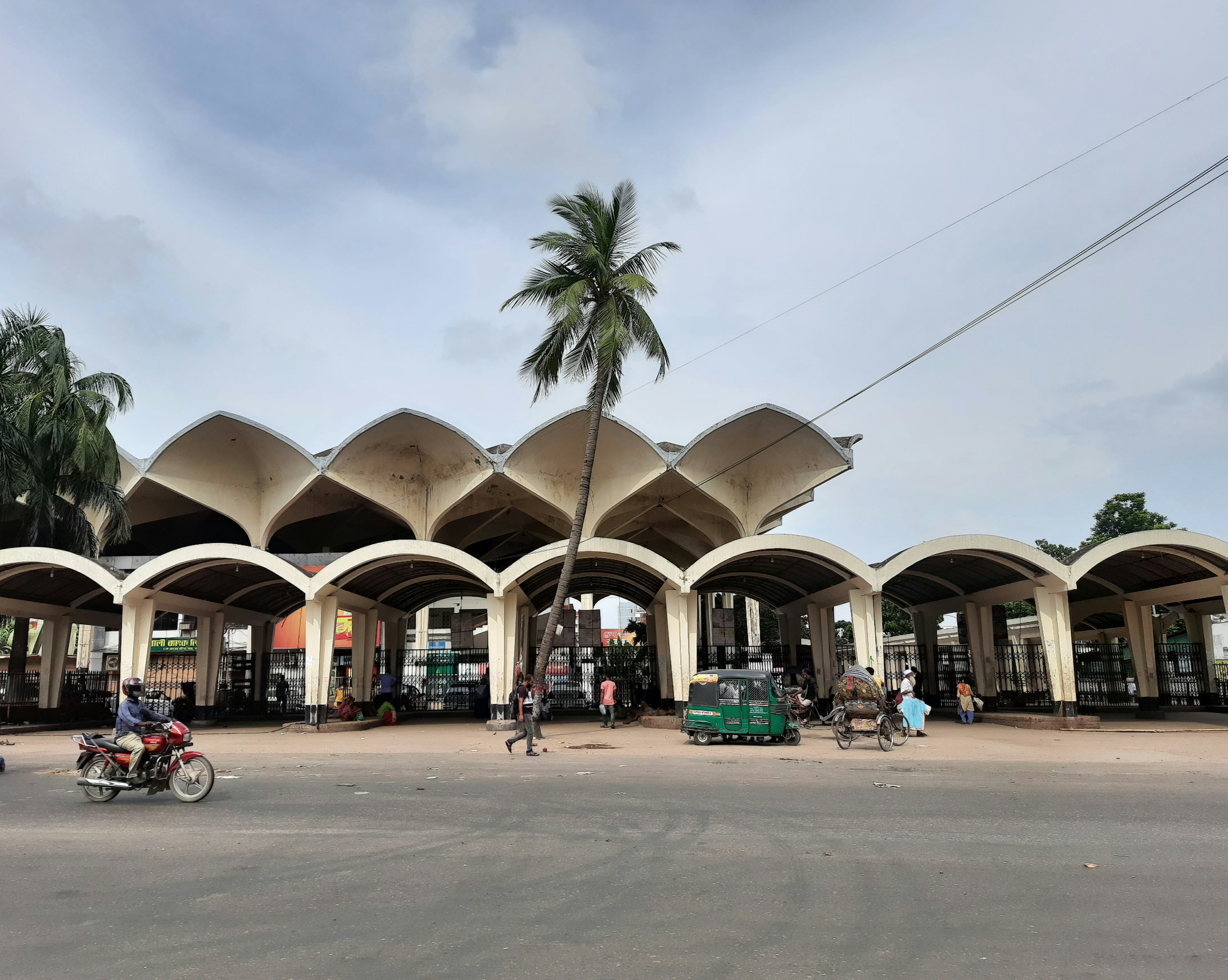
Entrance of the station

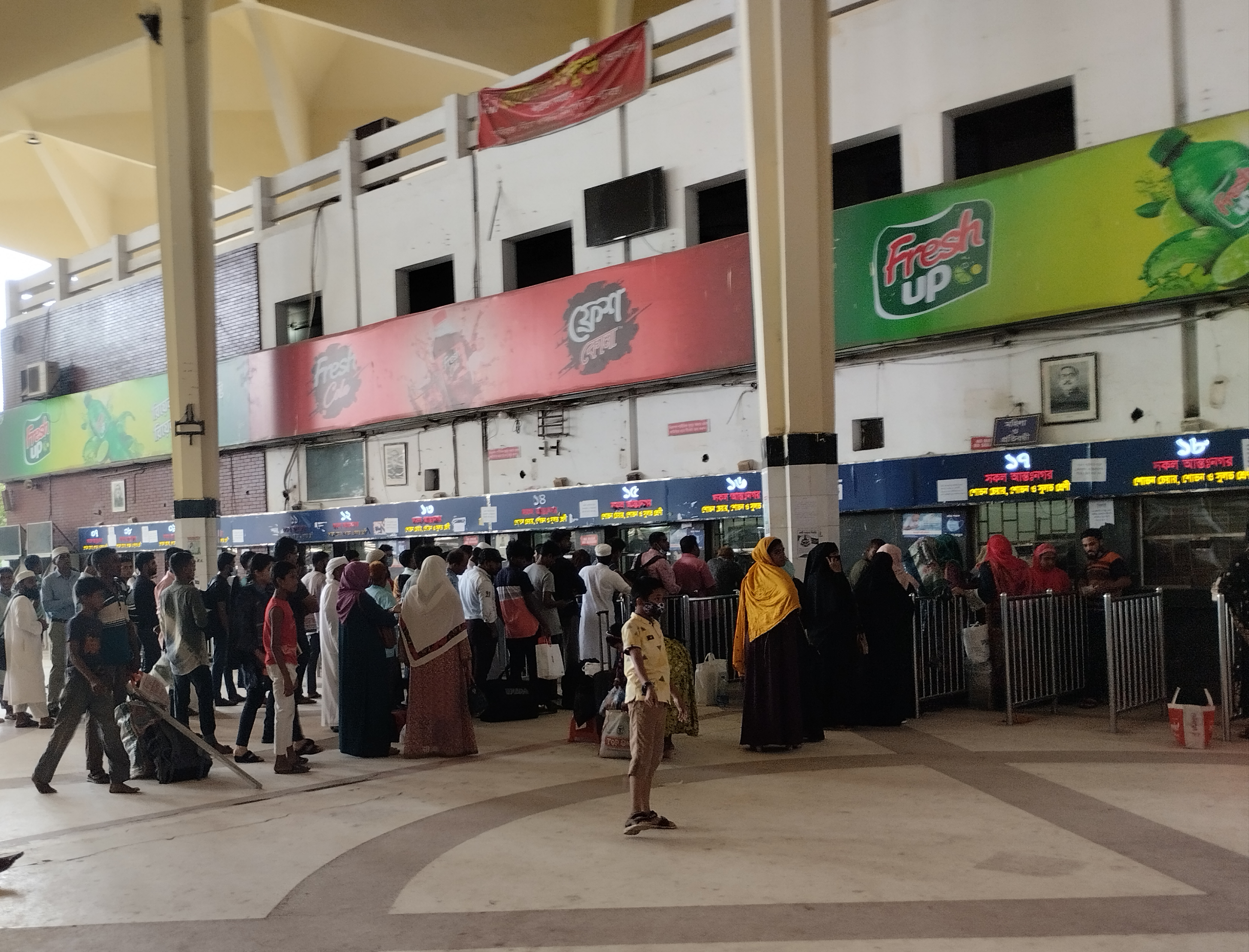
Ticket Counter

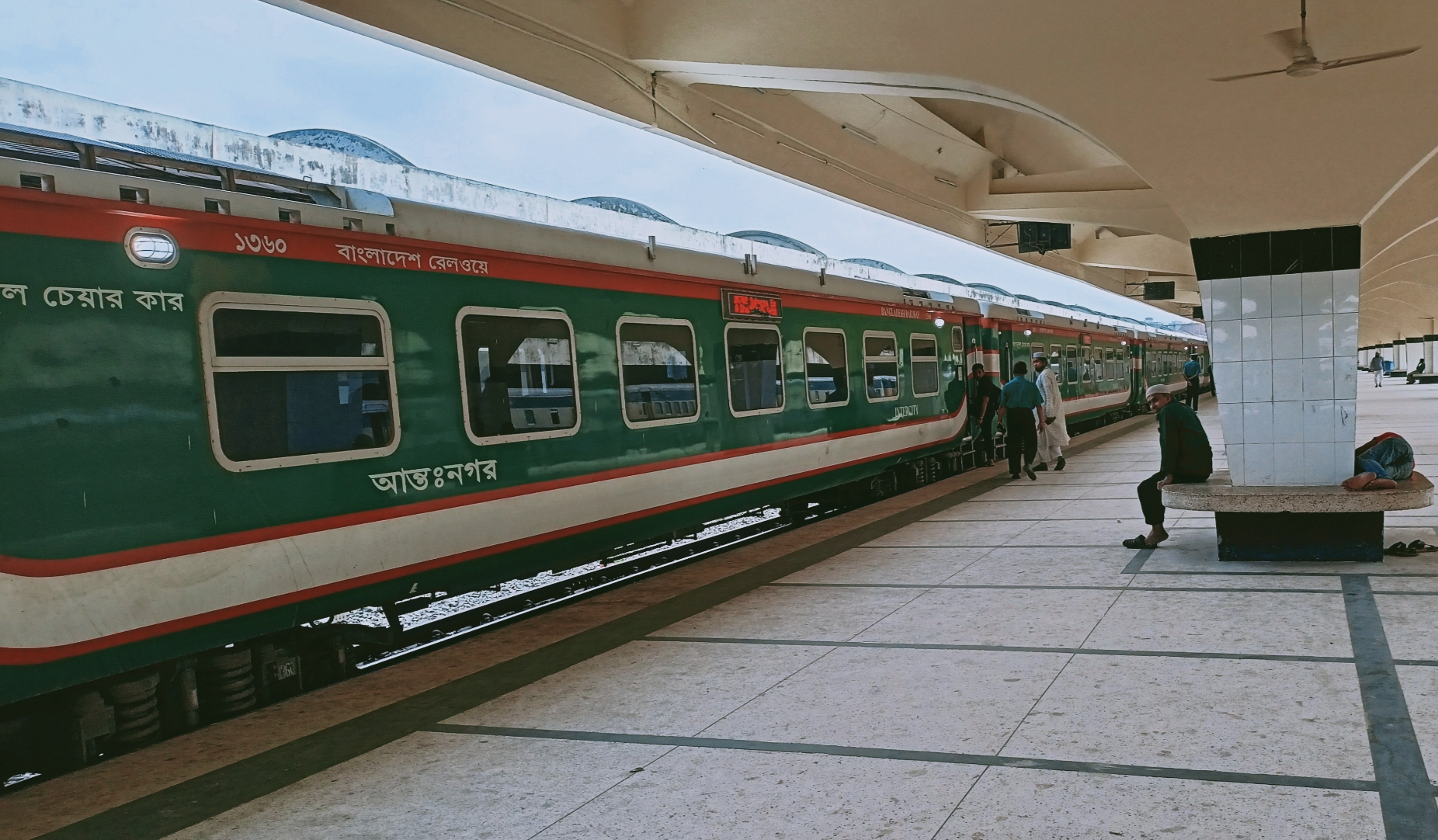
Train at the station

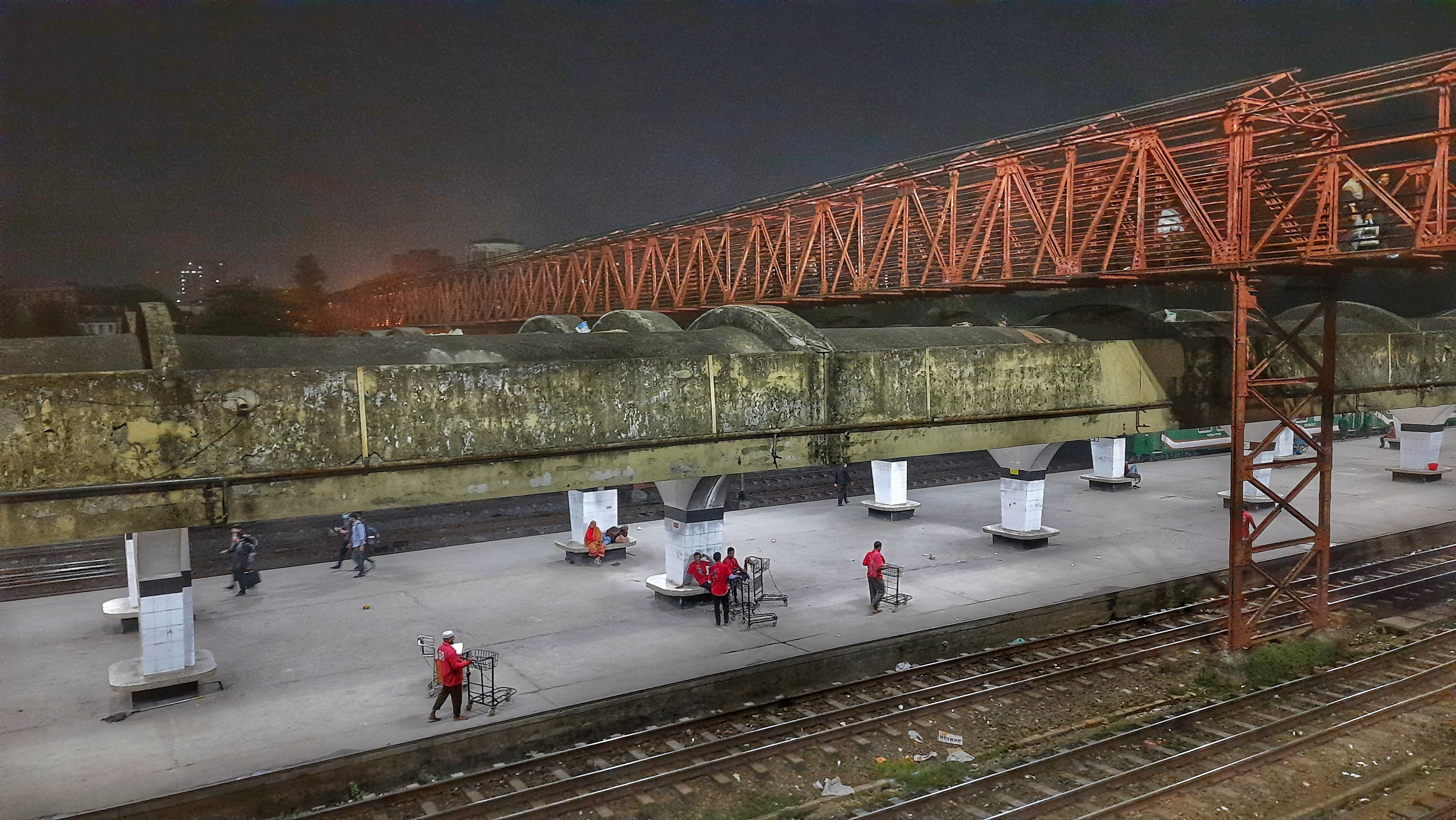
A pedestrian bridge at the station

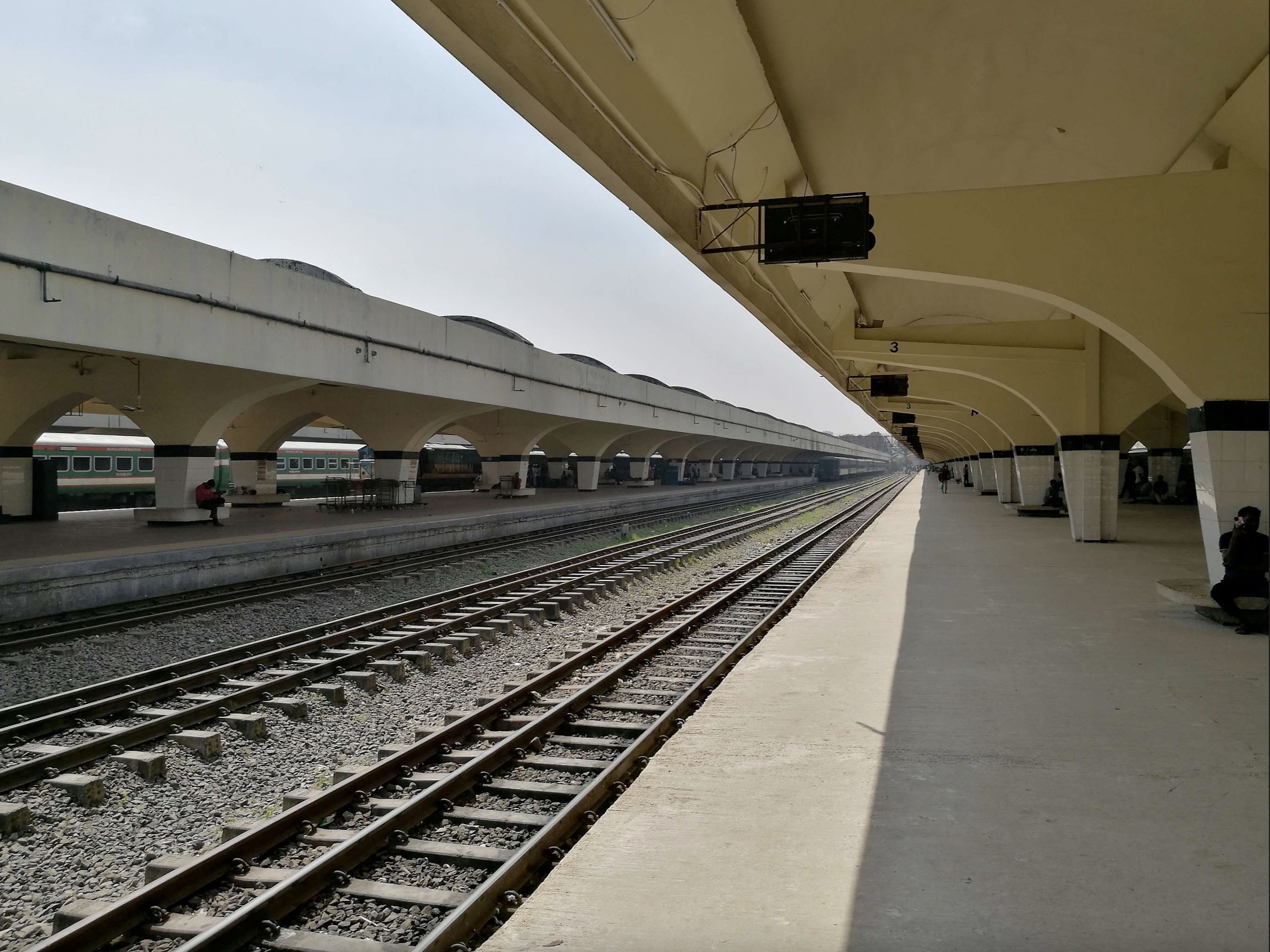
Platform 3

Illuminated during the Mujib Year celebration

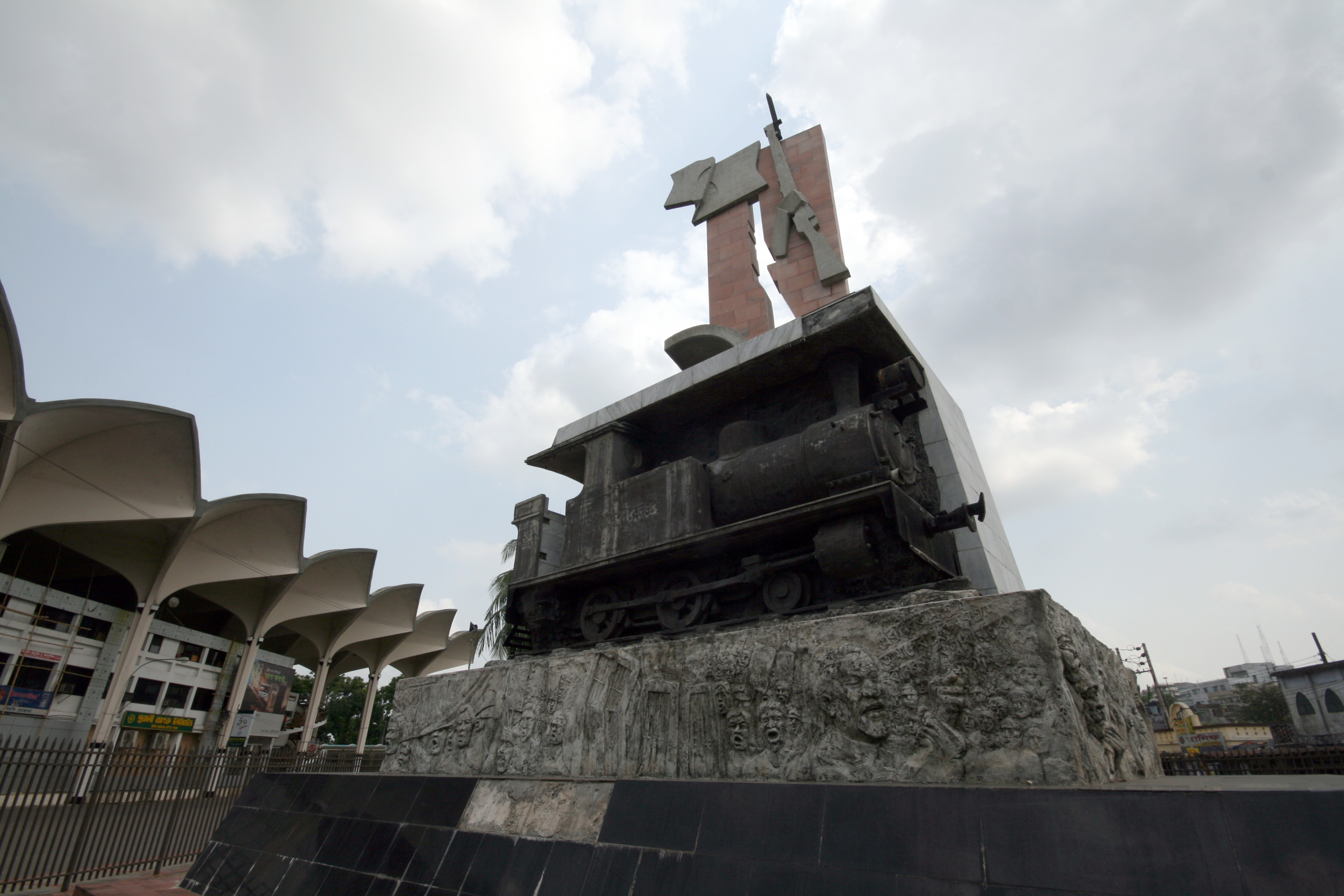
Suryaketan

== See also ==
- Kaliakoir Hi-Tech City railway station
- Sylhet railway station
