= Gandaria railway station =

Railway station in Bangladesh

Gandaria গেন্ডারিয়া

General information
- Location: Dhaka; Bangladesh
- Coordinates: 23°42′05″N 90°25′44″E
- Owner: Bangladesh Railway
- Lines: Narayanganj–Bahadurabad Ghat line Dhaka–Jessore line
- Platforms: 3
- Tracks: Dual Gauge

Construction
- Structure type: Standard (on ground station)

Other information
- Status: Functioning
- Station code: GNDR
- Zone(s): East Zone
- Division(s): Dhaka

History
- Opened: 1885

Services
Preceding station	Bangladesh Railway	Following station
Shyampur Baraitala towards Narayanganj	Narayanganj–Bahadurabad Ghat	Kamalapur towards Bahadurabad Ghat
Kamalapur Terminus	Dhaka–Jessore	Keraniganj towards Rupdia or Singia Junction
Location

Gandaria Railway Station is a railway station located in Gendaria Thana, Dhaka District, Bangladesh. The Dhaka–Jessore line starts from this station.

== History ==
The demand for jute was increasing all over the world. For the purpose of meeting that growing demand, there was a need for better communication system than the existing communication system to supply jute from Eastern Bengal to Port of Kolkata. Therefore in 1885 a 144 km wide meter gauge railway line named Dhaka State Railway was constructed to bring raw jute to Kolkata mainly by river which connects Mymensingh with Narayanganj. Gandaria railway station was built as part of the project during the construction of Narayanganj–Bahadurabad Ghat line.

Under the Padma Bridge Rail Link Project launched in 2018, the plan to rebuild the Gandaria railway station was taken up. The reconstruction is scheduled to be completed by June 2024. In 2023, the East Zone proposed to convert the station into a terminal to reduce passenger pressure on the Kamalapur railway station.

== Trains ==
Narayanganj Commuter and some local trains run through Gandaria railway station.
