= Tista Express =

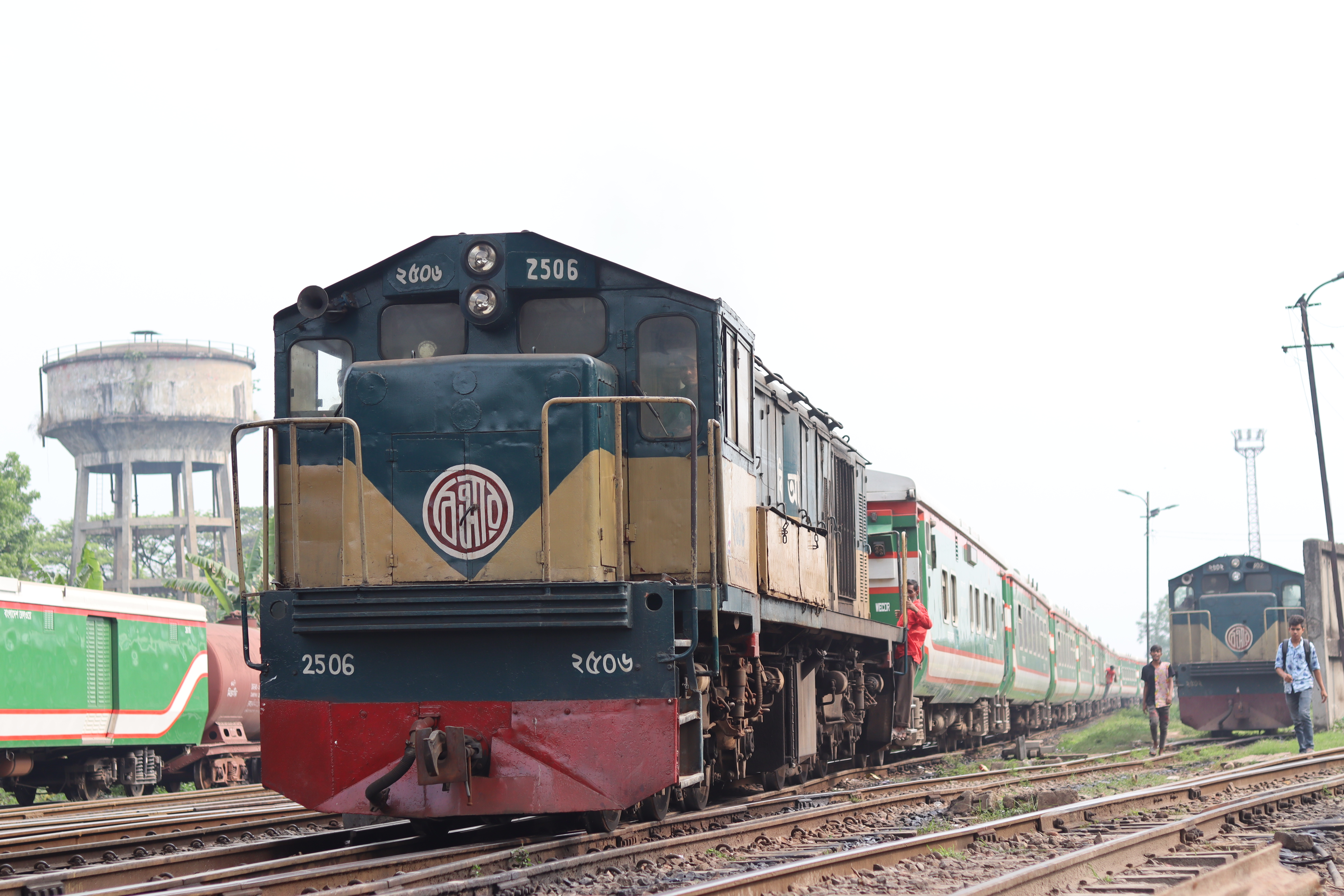

Overview
- Service type: Intercity Express
- Status: Weekly 6 Days (Monday OFF)
- First service: 16 March 1986; 37 years ago
- Current operator: Bangladesh Railway

Route
- Termini: Kamalapur railway station Dewanganj Bazar Railway Station
- Stops: 8
- Distance travelled: 212 K.M.(132 Mile)
- Average journey time: 5 Hours, 10 Minutes
- Train number: 707-708
- Line used: Metre Gauge

On-board services
- Classes: CHAIR, AC, FIRST CLASS
- Seating arrangements: AC_S, SNIGDHA, F_SEAT, S_CHAIR, AC_BATH, F_BATH
- Sleeping arrangements: No
- Catering facilities: Yes
- Entertainment facilities: No
- Baggage facilities: Overhead Rac
- Other facilities: Prayer Place, Canteen

Technical
- Track gauge: 1,000 mm (3 ft 3 3/8 in)
- Track owner: Bangladesh Railway

The Tista Express (train numbers 707/708) is a high-speed inter-city train of the Bangladesh Railway, operating between Dhaka and Dewanganj Upazila every day of the week except Monday. It runs from Kamalapur railway station in Dhaka to Dewanganj railway station. The train is a red-green Indonesian air brake. The load of the train is 18/36. This train connects the 3 districts of Dhaka, Mymensingh and Jamalpur on a journey and sometimes Gazipur. Dhaka to Dewanganj train schedule Tista Express takes 5 hours and 10 minutes from Dhaka to Dewanganj.

== Schedule ==
Tista Express Train Time Table Dhaka to Dewanganj
Train No	Train Name	Off Day	Departure	Arrive	Off Day
707	Tista Express	Dhaka to Dewanganj	7.30 AM	11.29 AM	Monday
708	Tista Express	Dewanganj to Dhaka	2:55 PM	8:25 PM	Monday

Tista Express Stoppage:

- Airport Railway Station
- At Joydevpur Junction Station
- At Gafargaon Railway Station
- At Mymensingh Junction Station
- At Pierpur Railway Station
- At Jamalpur town Junction Station
- At Melandah market
- At Islampur market
- and Dewanganj market
