= Kaliakoir Hi–Tech City railway station =

Railway station in Gazipur District, Bangladesh

Kaliakoir High–Tech City কালিয়াকৈর হাই–টেক সিটি
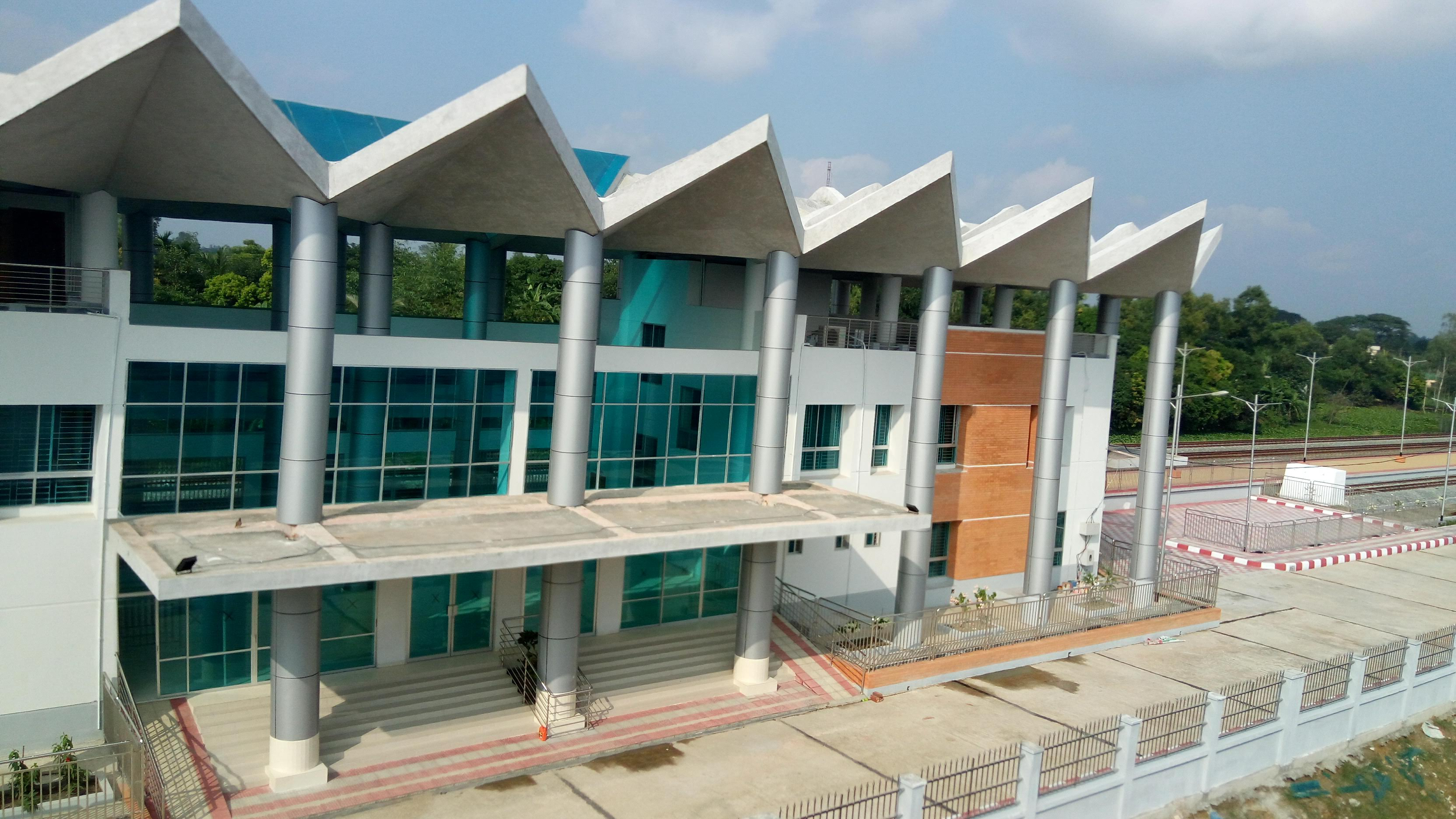

General information
- Location: Kaliakoir Hi–Tech Park, Kaliakair Upazila, Gazipur District; Dhaka Division; Bangladesh
- Coordinates: 24.0627°N 90.2203°E
- System: B class station of Bangladesh Railway
- Owner: Bangladesh Railway
- Operator: Bangladesh Railway
- Line: Jamtoil–Joydebpur line
- Platforms: 1
- Tracks: 3
- Train operators: Bangladesh Railway

Other information
- Status: Active

History
- Opened: 1 November 2018; 7 years ago

Services
Preceding station	Bangladesh Railway	Following station
Mouchak	Line; Jamtoil–Joydebpur	Mirzapur (Tangail)
Location

Kaliakoir Hi–Tech City Railway Station is a B class railway station in Bangladesh located on the western side of Kaliakoir Hi–Tech Park in Kaliakair Upazila of Gazipur District. The station was inaugurated on 1 November 2018. It is regarded as a ghost station now.

== Infrastructure ==
The original design of this station is designed like the central station of the country named Kamalapur railway station in Dhaka District. Its estimated construction budget is ৳50 crore. It consists of a platform and a loop line.

== Service ==
Following is the list of trains passing through Kaliakoir Hi-Tech Park Railway Station:

- Sirajganj Express
- Tangail Commuter
- Kaliakor Commuter

== Accident ==
- 7 November 2020: 766 Down Nilsagar Express collided with a passenger bus at a railway crossing in Sonakhali area near Kaliakoir Hi-Tech City Railway Station around 4 am. Two people including a bus passenger died. Another one died after the three injured were taken to Kaliakair Upazila Health Complex.
