= Pakistan Eastern Railway =

1961–1971 railway in modern Bangladesh

- Native name: پاکستان مشرقی ریلویز পাকিস্তান পূর্ব রেলওয়ে
- Type: State-owned enterprise
- Industry: Rail transport; Logistics; Freight transport
- Predecessor: Eastern Bengal Railway & Assam Bengal Railway
- Founded: 1 February 1961 (65 years ago)
- Defunct: 1971
- Successor: Bangladesh Railway
- Headquarters: Chittagong, East Pakistan
- Area served: East Bengal (with limited service to India)
- Owner: Government of Pakistan
- Parent: Ministry of Railways

The Pakistan Eastern Railway (Urdu: پاکستان مشرقی ریلویز, Bengali: পাকিস্তান পূর্ব রেলওয়ে) was one of two divisions of Pakistan Railways which operated between 1961 and 1971. The company was headquartered in Chittagong. With the emergence of Bangladesh, it became Bangladesh Railway.

== History ==
When Pakistan gained its independence from Britain in 1947, the Eastern Bengal Railway & Assam Bengal Railway was split between Pakistan and India. Approximately 2,600 kilometres of rail track fell within East Bengal's territory in Pakistan. The railway was then renamed to Eastern Bengal Railway, under control of the federal government. On 1 February 1961, the Eastern Bengal Railway was renamed to the Pakistan Eastern Railway and in the following year, control of Pakistan Eastern Railway was transferred from the federal government to the Government of East Pakistan. It was placed under the management of the Pakistan Eastern Railways Board with the effect from the financial year 1962–63 by Presidential Order of 9 June 1962.

=== Successors ===
With Bangladesh becoming independent in 1971, the Pakistan Eastern Railway renamed itself to Bangladesh Railway.

== See also ==
- Rail transport in India § History
- Northeast Frontier Railway
