= Narayanganj–Bahadurabad Ghat line =

Railway line in Bangladesh

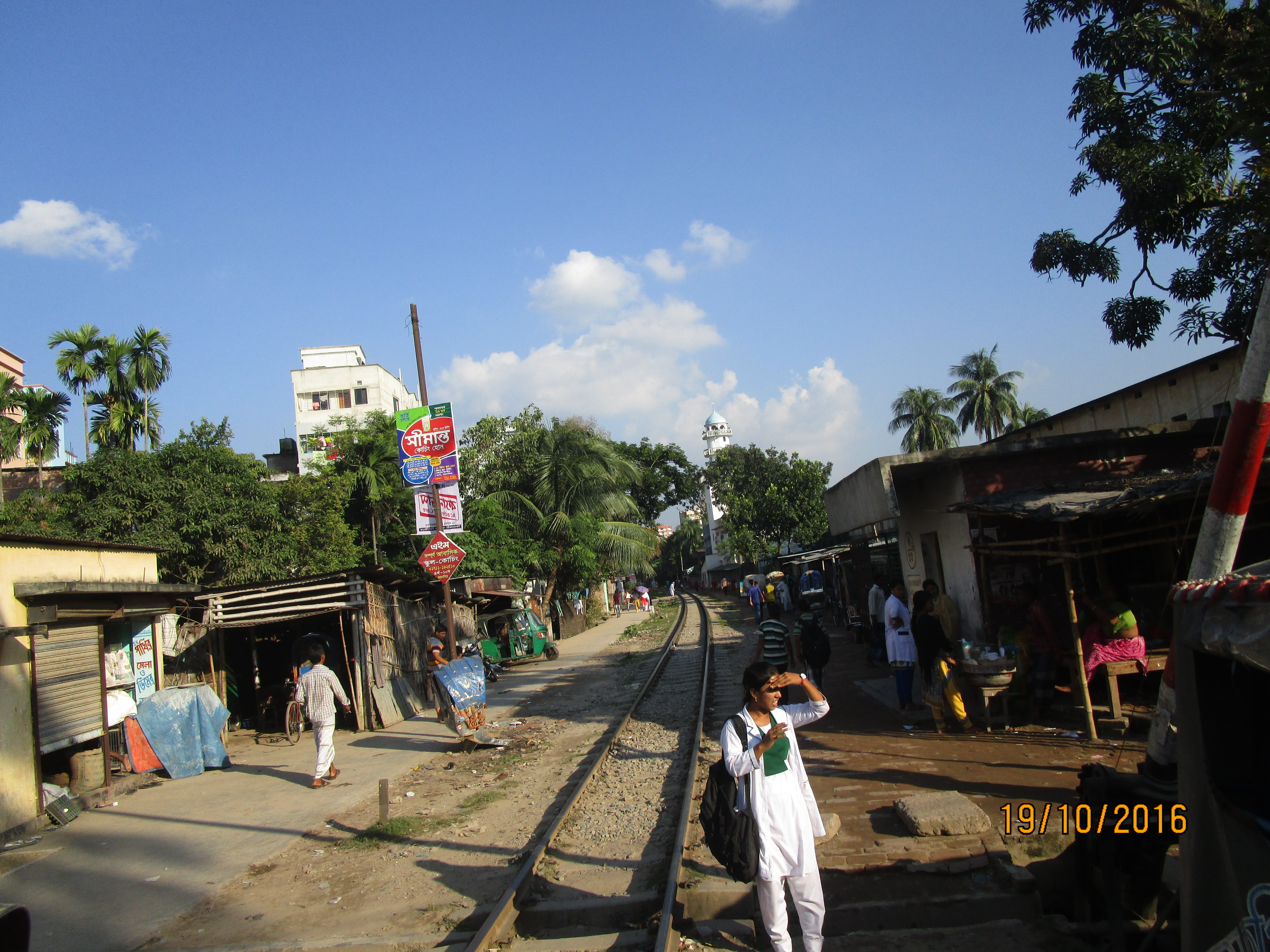
- Narayanganj Bahadurabad Ghat Line at madrasa Quarter Railcrossing, Mymensingh

Overview
- Status: Operational
- Owner: Bangladesh Railway
- Locale: Bangladesh
- Termini: Narayanganj; Bahadurabad Ghat
- Stations: 42

History
- Opened: 1884–85

Technical
- Number of tracks: 2/ 1 ?
- Track gauge: Dual gauge 1,676 mm (5 ft 6 in); 1,000 mm (3 ft 3 3/8 in) metre gauge
- Operating speed: ?

The Narayanganj–Bahadurabad Ghat line is a railway line connecting Narayanganj and Bahadurabad Ghat in Bangladesh. There are branch lines to Jagannathganj Ghat and Netrakona-Mohanganj. This track is under the jurisdiction of Bangladesh Railway.

== History ==
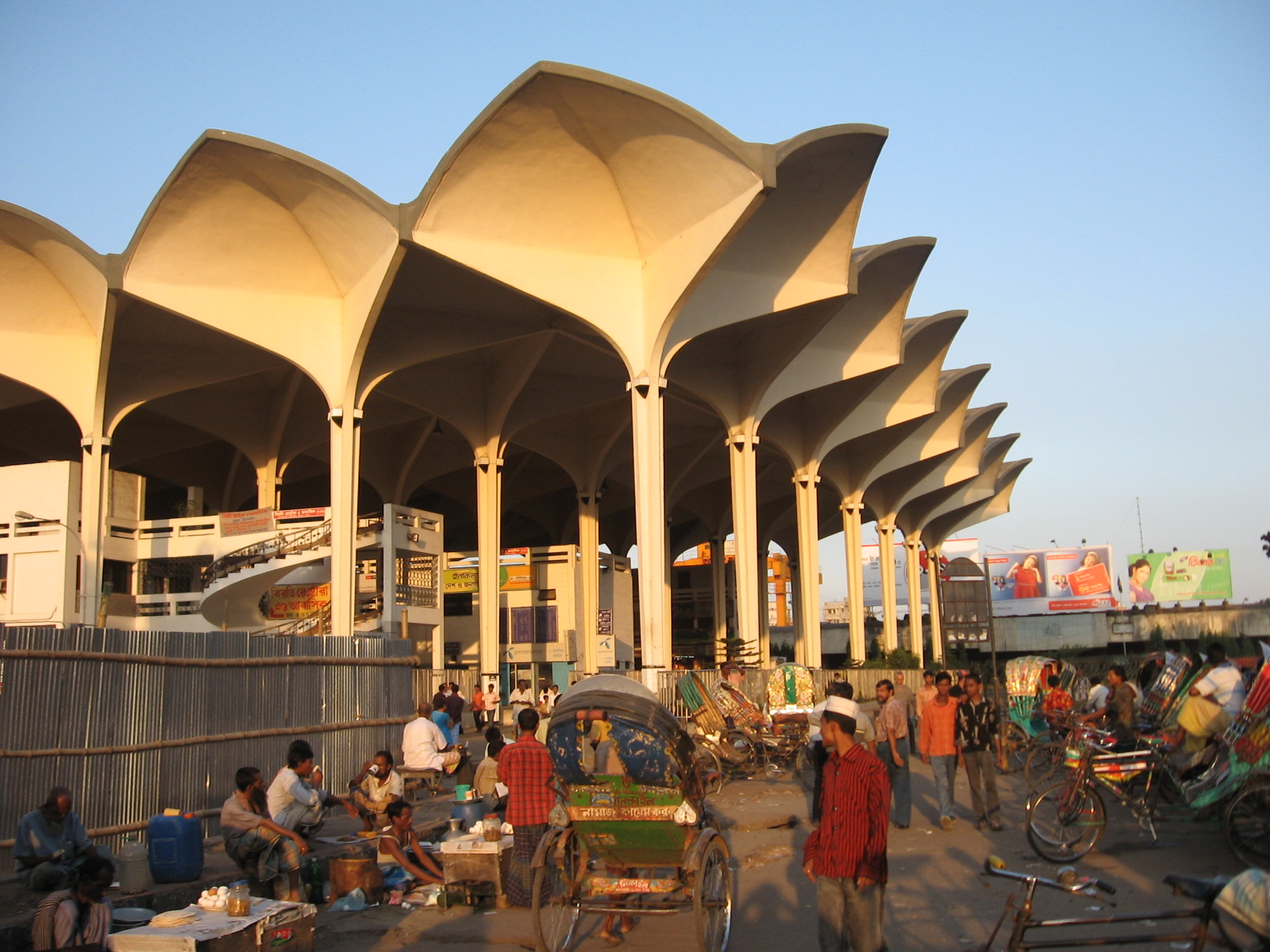
Dhaka Kamalapur railway station

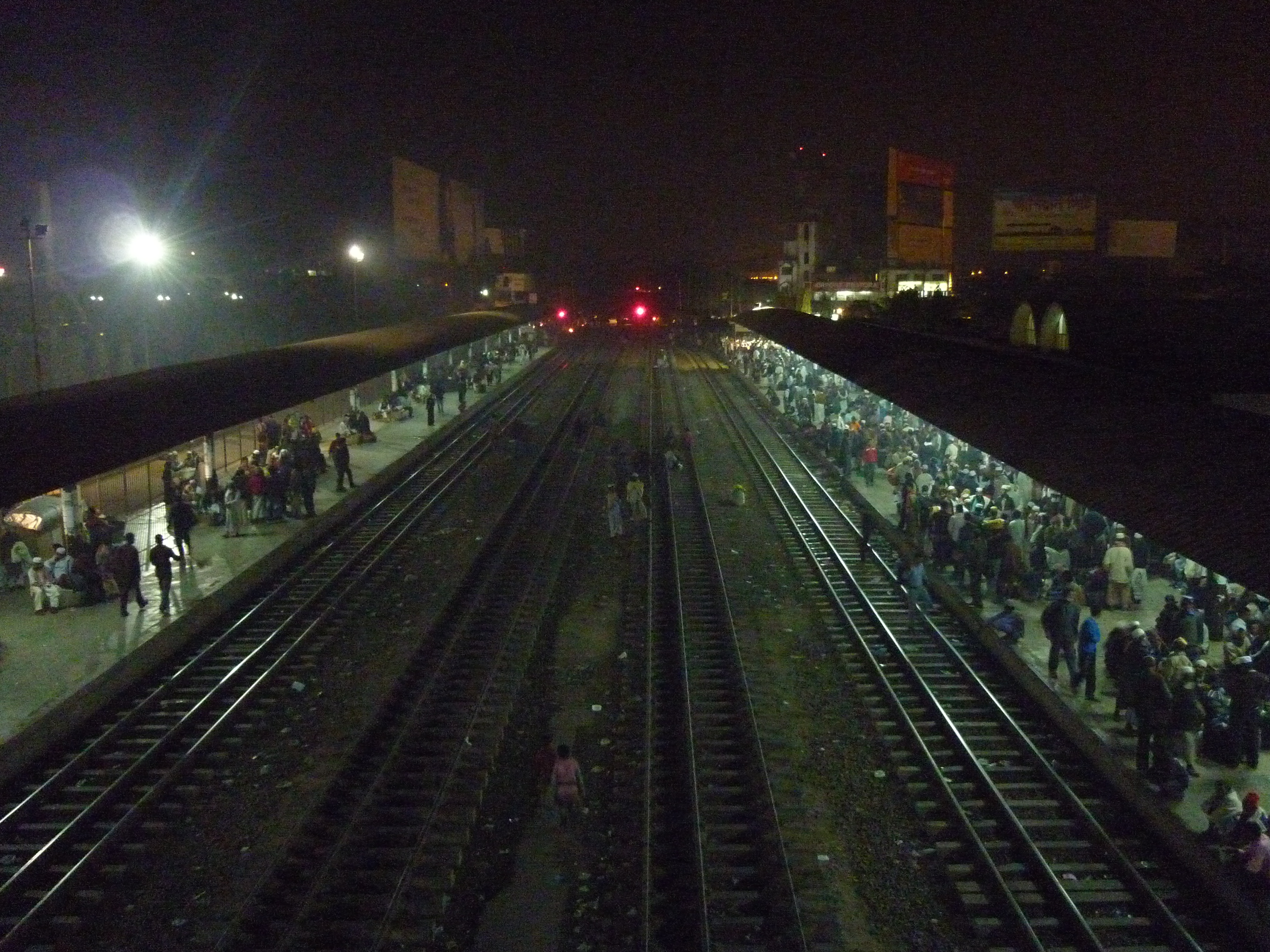
Dhaka Bimanbandor railway station

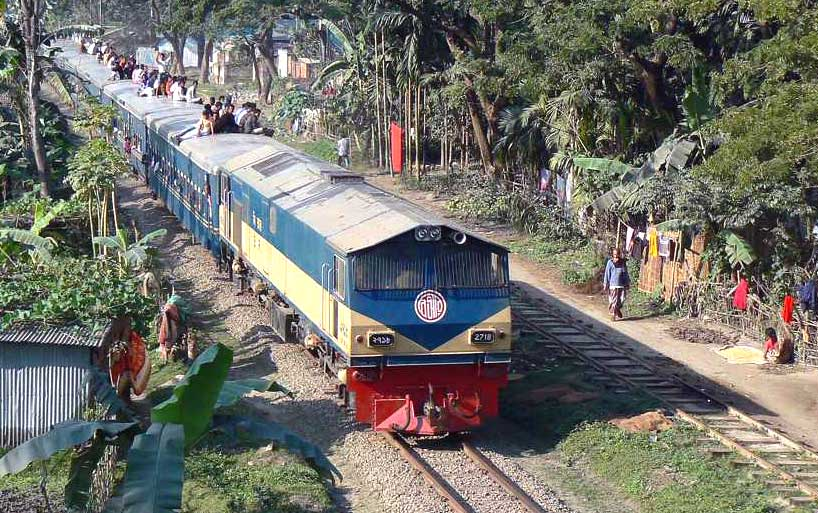
Intercity Tista Express that runs between Dhaka and Bahdurabad Ghat

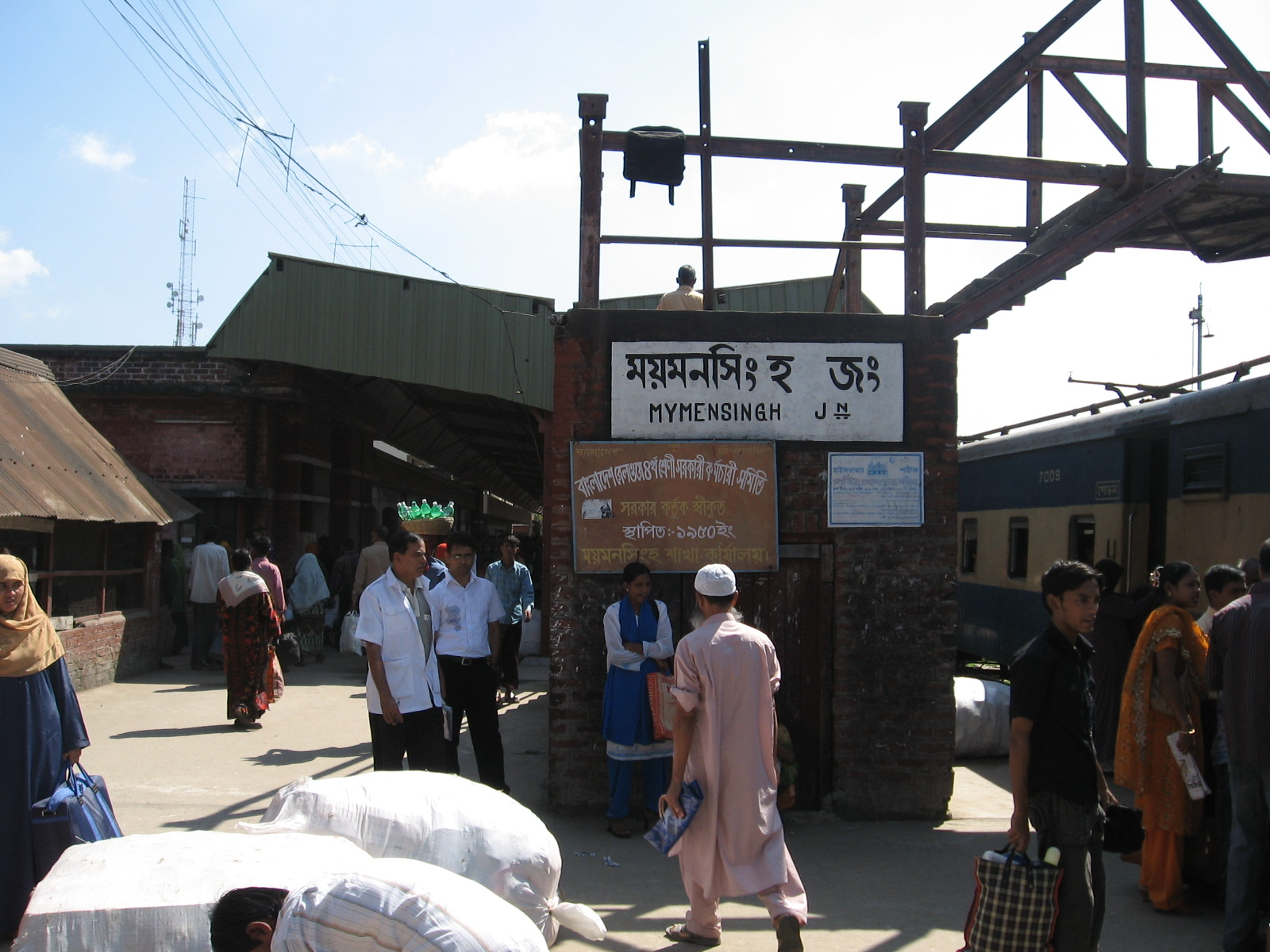
Mymensingh railway station

The Dhaka State Railway opened the 144-kilometre (89 mi) long metre gauge railway from Narayanganj to Mymensingh via Dhaka in 1884–1885. This line was meant primarily for the collection of jute and its onward dispatch to Kolkata, then known as Calcutta. It was also used by passengers to and from Kolkata, making way from Narayanganj and vice versa to Goalundo Ghat which was connected to Kolkata by rail in 1871. The launch from Goalundo Ghat to Narayanganj, across the Padma, traversed the course in about seven hours.

The line was extended for another 88 kilometres (55 mi) to Jagannathganj Ghat, on the east bank of the Jamuna, soon after its opening. The Bahadurabad Ghat–Jamalpur (also known as Singjhani) metre gauge line was opened in 1912, connecting it to another point on the Jamuna. The line from Santahar to Fulchhari (Tistamukhghat), on the west bank of the Jamuna, opened during 1899–1900. It was connected to Bahadurabad by ferry. The 80-km long Iswardi-Sirajganj section was commissioned in 1916, connected it to another point on the Jamuna. This was connected to Jagannathganj Ghat by ferry. The ferries were operated by the railways.

The construction of this track opened up the possibilities of linking such places as Gouripur, Kishoreganj, Bhairab Bazar and Mohanganj through branch lines.

== Ferries at Bahadurabad Ghat and Jagannathganj Ghat ==
In Bangladesh, ferries are often an integrated part of the railway system. There were two major ferry points across the Jamuna, one between Bahadurabad Ghat and Tistamukh Ghat and the other between Jagannath Ghat and Sirajganj Ghat.

The ferry system had reached the limits of its capacity. While marginal capacity additions were still feasible, to cope with any significant increase in capacity or even normal traffic growth was virtually felt to be impossible.

The construction of the 4.8 kilometres (3.0 mi) Bangabandhu Bridge has completely changed the scope of communication systems in this part of the country. The ferry system at both the Bahadurabad Ghat–Balashi Ghat and the Jagannathganj Ghat-Sirajganj Ghat was virtually closed. Only limited freight transportation continued on the Bahadurabad Ghat-Balashi section. Even that has been closed down in 2010 because of formation of shoal in the river.

As of 2010, the Teesta Express runs from Dhaka to Bahadurabad on all days except Monday when it terminates at Dewanganj. The Brahmaputra Express terminates at Dewanganj Bazar. There are a number of other trains terminating at Dewanganj. The Mymensingh Express terminates at Jagannathganj Ghat. The Jamuna Express terminates at Tarakandi.

== Locale ==
This line followed the old channel of the Brahmaputra River, right from its point of separation with the Jamuna down to the mouth of the Shitalakshya River, a branch of the Brahmaputra.

== Tangail ==
Tangail is on the Dhaka Cantonment-Iswardi broad gauge line. There are numerous buses from all around. According to the Mymensingh Gazetteer of 1917, Tangail used to be more difficult to reach: "At present travellers from Mymensingh to Tangail usually go by train to Jagannathganj, steamer to Porabari, and then 12 miles by country boat, bicycle or horse."

== Kishoreganj ==
The Mymensingh–Bhairab Bazar Railway Company constructed the Mymensingh–Gouripur–Kishoreganj–Bhairab Bazar Line between 1912 and 1918. It was acquired by the government in 1948–49 and the Assam Bengal Railway was in charge of the management of the line.

== Netrakona–Mohanganj ==
Mymensingh–Bhairab Bazar Railway Company constructed the railway sections of Mymensingh–Gouripur–Netrokona–Mohanganj railway track between 1912 and 1918. It was acquired by the government in 1948–49 and is now under the jurisdiction of Bangladesh Railway.

== Rolling stock ==
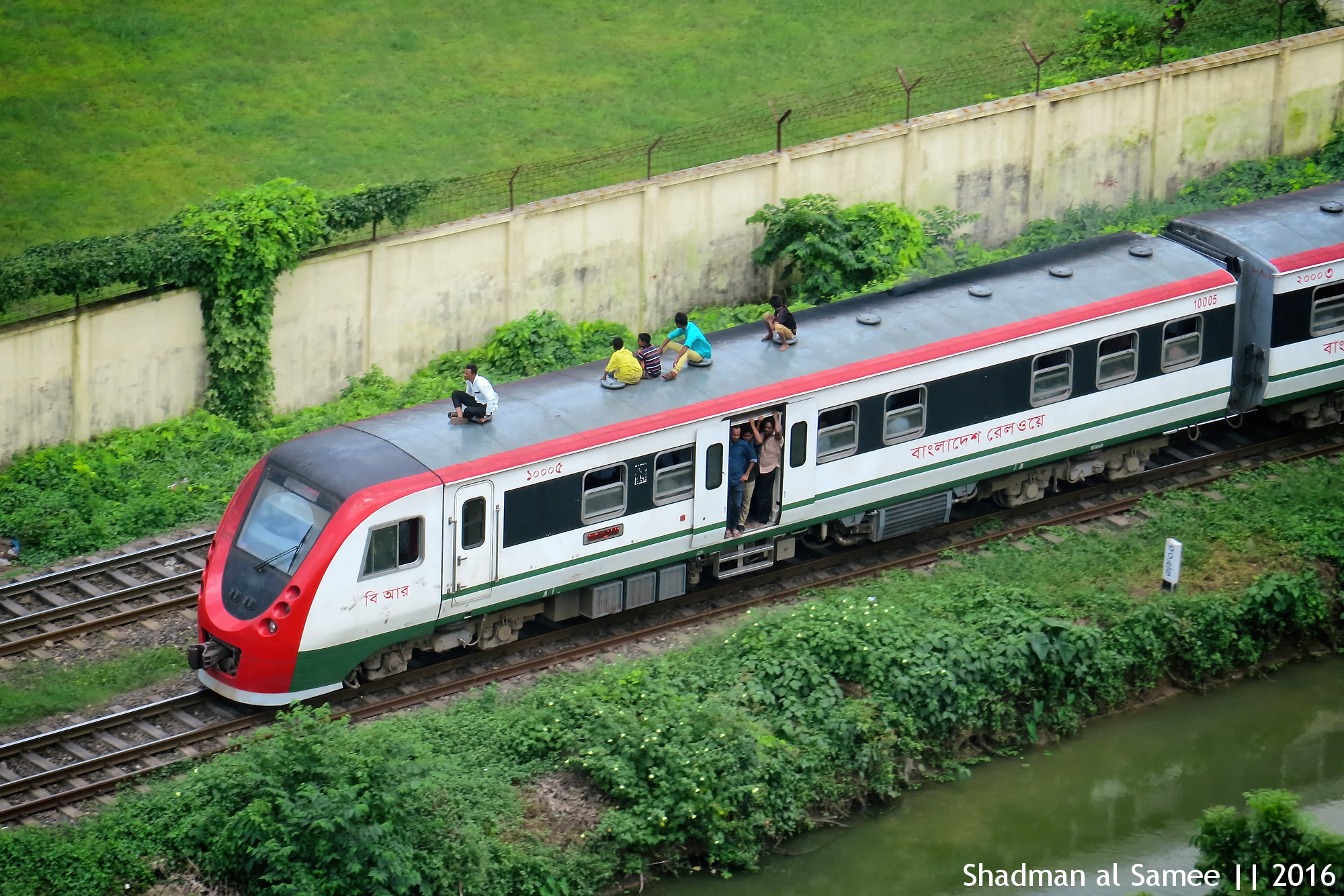
Bangladesh Railway DEMU

On 24 April 2013, the first Diesel Electrical Multiple Unit (DEMU) service in the country was inaugurated between Narayanganj and Dhaka. Twenty DEMU sets were purchased from Chinese manufacturer CRRC Tangshan for Tk 460 crore (US$59 million as of 2013). Each set consists of three carriages, with the engines incorporated into the ones on either end, and has a capacity of 149 seated passengers and 151 standing passengers. Eighteen months later, the Dhaka Tribune characterized the DEMU service as "a lemon" because travel time was little better than conventional service, carriages had inadequate ventilation, and there was a three-foot mismatch between carriage door and station platform heights. By July 2019, half of the DEMUs were out of operation due to break downs. Prime Minister Sheikh Hasina described them as "unfit", and said no more would be purchased.
