= Narayanganj railway station =

Railway station in Narayanganj, Bangladesh

Narayanganj নারায়ণগঞ্জ

General information
- Location: Narayanganj; Bangladesh
- Coordinates: 23.618702°N 90.505571°E
- System: Bangladesh Railway Station
- Line: Narayanganj–Bahadurabad Ghat line
- Platforms: 02
- Tracks: Metre Gauge

Construction
- Structure type: Standard (on ground station)

Other information
- Status: Functioning
- Station code: NGJ
- Zone(s): East Zone
- Division(s): Dhaka

History
- Opened: 4 January 1885

Services
Preceding station	Bangladesh Railway	Following station
Terminus	Narayanganj–Bahadurabad Ghat	Chashara towards Bahadurabad Ghat
Location

Narayanganj Railway Station (Bengali: নারায়ণগঞ্জ রেলওয়ে জংশন) is located in Narayanganj District, Bangladesh. The station is the main and populated station of Narayanganj city.

Narayanganj Railway Junction was the famous railway station in the British and Pakistan period also still now. This is the oldest railway station in the region. The station was most important terminal specially jute trading meant Adamjee Jute Mills and other communication routes abreast ferry terminal along with bus terminal. Now everyday around more than thirty thousand passengers travel to the capital from Narayanganj by train.

== History ==
Narayanganj Railway Junction is situated on the western bank of Shitalakshya River at the point where the Brahmaputra and Buriganga discharge into the Shitalakshya.

In December 1882, the Government of Bengal began work on the Dacca State Railway, connecting Dacca with Narayanganj, its satellite river port to the south, and with Mymensingh to the north. Revenue service on the 10.25 miles (16.50 km) Dacca-Narayanganj segment began on 4 January 1885. The 75.25 miles (121.10 km) Mymensingh-Dhaka segment opened for cargo on 1 August 1885, and thereafter opened for passengers gradually in sections through 18 February 1886. At completion, rolling stock consisted of 12 engines, 60 passenger coaches, and 345 freight wagons. The line was used mainly to transport jute to the port of Narayanganj, from which it was shipped by river to Calcutta.

== Present condition ==
Everyday except Friday there are sixteen trains departure from Narayanganj And sixteen trains arrival from Dhaka in this Junction and they run from early morning at 6.25 AM to 11.15 PM. At Friday six trains up and down between Narayanganj and Dhaka from morning to evening.

== See also ==
- Narayanganj-Bahadurabad Ghat Line
