= Bahadurabad Ghat railway station =

Railway station in Jamalpur District, Bangladesh

Bahadurabad Ghat বাহাদুরাবাদ ঘাট

General information
- Location: Dewanganj Upazila, Jamalpur District; Bangladesh
- Coordinates: 25°09′57″N 89°44′05″E
- System: Passenger train station
- Owner: Bangladesh Railway
- Line: Narayanganj–Bahadurabad Ghat line

Construction
- Structure type: Standard (on ground station)

Other information
- Status: Defunct
- Station code: BHBD
- Zone(s): East Zone
- Division(s): Dhaka

History
- Opened: 1912
- Former names: Assam Bengal Railway (1912–1947); Pakistan Eastern Railway (1947–1971)

Services
Preceding station	Bahadurabad Ghat railway station	Following station
Dewanganj Bazar	Line; Narayanganj–Bahadurabad Ghat	Terminus
Location

Bahadurabad Ghat Railway Station is a defunct railway station located in Dewanganj Upazila, Jamalpur District, Bangladesh.

== History ==
The demand for jute was increasing all over the world towards the end of the 19th century. Meeting the growing demand required better communication system than the existing options to supply jute from Eastern Bengal to Port of Kolkata. Therefore, in 1885, a 144 km wide meter gauge railway line named Dhaka State Railway was constructed to bring raw jute to Kolkata mainly by river which connects Mymensingh with Narayanganj. This railway was extended up to Jamalpur in 1894 and up to Jagannathganj in Sarishabari Upazila in 1899. In 1912, the railway line was extended from Jamalpur to Bahadurabad Ghat.

== Rail ferry ==
Bahadurabad Ghat was connected by rail ferry across Jamuna river to Tistamukh Ghat by Santahar–Kaunia line.
