= List of passenger trains in Bangladesh =

This article contains a list of passenger trains in Bangladesh.

== Inter-city ==
Train No.	Train Name
701–702	Subarna Express
703–704	Mahanagar Prabhati/Godhuli Express
705–706	Ekota Express
707–708	Tista Express
709–710	Parabat Express
711–712	Upakul Express
713–714	Karatoya Express
715–716	Kapotaksha Express
717–718	Jayantika Express
719–720	Paharika Express
721–722	Mahanagar Express
723–724	Udayan Express
725–726	Sundarban Express
727–728	Rupsha Express
729–730	Meghna Express
731–732	Barendra Express
733–734	Titumir Express
735–736	Agnibina Express
737–738	Egarosindur Provati
739–740	Upaban Express
741–742	Turna Express
743–744	Brahmaputra Express
745–746	Jamuna Express
747–748	Simanta Express
749–750	Egarosindur Godhuli
751–752	Lalmoni Express
753–754	Silkcity Express
755–756	Madhumati Express
757–758	Drutojan Express
759–760	Padma Express
761–762	Sagardari Express
763–764	Chitra Express
765–766	Nilsagar Express
767–768	Dolonchapa Express
769–770	Dhumketu Express
771–772	Rangpur Express
773–774	Kalni Express
775–776	Sirajganj Express
777–778	Haor Express
779–780	Dhalarchar Express
781–782	Kishoreganj Express
783–784	Tungipara Express
785–786	Bijoy Express
787–788	Shonar Bangla Express
789–790	Mohanganj Express
791–792	Banalata Express
793–794	Panchagarh Express
795–796	Benapole Express
797–798	Kurigram Express
799–800	Jamalpur Express
801–802	Chattala Express
803–804	Banglabandha Express
805-806	Chilahati Express
807-808	Pabna Express (Proposed)
809-810	Burimari Express
813-814	Cox's Bazar Express
815-816	Parjatak Express
817-818	Subarnochar Express (Proposed)
819-820	Tanguar Express (Proposed)
821–824	Shaikat Express
822–823	Probal Express
825-826	Jahanabad Express
827-828	Ruposhi Bangla Express

== Local, Mail, Shuttle & Commuter ==
No.	Name	Start	End
1	Dhaka Mail	Chattogram	Dhaka
2	Chattogram Mail	Dhaka	Chattogram
3	Karnaphuli Commuter	Chattogram	Dhaka
4	Karnaphuli Commuter	Dhaka	Chattogram
5	Rajshahi Commuter	Dhaka	Chapai Nawabganj
6	Rajshahi Commuter	Chapai Nawabganj	Ishwardi
7	Uttarbanga Mail (Off)	Santahar	Panchagarh
8	Uttarbanga Mail (Off)	Panchagarh	Santahar
9	Surma Mail	Dhaka	Sylhet
10	Surma Mail	Sylhet	Dhaka
11	Dhaka Express	Noakhali	Dhaka
12	Noakhali Express	Dhaka	Noakhali
13	Jalalabad Express (Off)	Chattogram	Sylhet
14	Jalalabad Express (Off)	Sylhet	Chattogram
15	Mahananda Mail	Khulna	Chapai Nawabganj
16	Mahananda Mail	Chapai Nawabganj	Khulna
17	Kushiara Express (Off)	Akhaura	Sylhet
18	Kushiara Express (Off)	Sylhet	Akhaura
19	Bogura Commuter	Santahar	Lalmonirhat
20	Bogura Commuter	Lalmonirhat	Santahar
21	Padmarag Commuter	Santahar	Lalmonirhat
22	Padmarag Commuter	Lalmonirhat	Santahar
23	Rocket Mail	Khulna	Parbatipur
24	Rocket Mail	Parbatipur	Khulna
25	Nakshikantha Mail	Khulna	Dhaka
26	Nakshikantha Mail	Dhaka	Khulna
27	Ghaghat Mail	Parbatipur	Chilahati
28	Ghaghat Mail	Chilahati	Parbatipur
29	Sagarika Commuter	Chattogram	Chandpur
30	Sagarika Commuter	Chandpur	Chattogram
31	Uttara Express	Rajshahi	Parbatipur
32	Uttara Express	Parbatipur	Rajshahi
33	Titas Commuter	Akhaura	Dhaka
34	Titas Commuter	Dhaka	Brahmanbaria
35	Titas Commuter	Brahmanbaria	Dhaka
36	Titas Commuter	Dhaka	Akhaura
37	Mymensingh Mail	Chattogram	Bhaupur
38	Mymensingh Mail	Bhaupur	Chattogram
39	Isakhan Mail (Off)	Dhaka	Mymensingh
40	Isakhan Mail (Off)	Mymensingh	Dhaka
41	Kanchan Commuter	Parbatipur	Panchagarh
42	Kanchan Commuter	Panchagarh	Parbatipur
43	Mohua Commuter	Dhaka	Mohanganj
44	Mohua Commuter	Mohanganj	Dhaka
45	Samatat Express	Noakhali	Laksam
46	Samatat Express	Laksam	Noakhali
47	Dewanganj Commuter	Dhaka	Dewanganj
48	Dewanganj Commuter	Dewanganj	Dhaka
49	Balaka Commuter	Dhaka	Jharia Jhanjail
50	Balaka Commuter	Jharia Jhanjail	Dhaka
51	Jamalpur Commuter	Dhaka	Dewanganj
52	Jamalpur Commuter	Dewanganj	Dhaka
53	Betna Commuter-1	Khulna	Benapole
54	Betna Commuter-4	Benapole	Khulna
55	Bhawal Express	Dhaka	Dewanganj
56	Bhawal Express	Dewanganj	Dhaka
57	Iswardi Commuter	Ishwardi	Rohanpur
58	Ishwardi Commuter	Rohonpur	Ishwardi
59	Ramsagar Express	Bonarpara	Dinajpur
60	Ramsagar Express	Dinajpur	Bonarpara
61	Dinajpur Commuter	Lalmonirhat	Biral
62	Dinajpur Commuter	Biral	Lalmonirhat
63	Lalmoni Commuter	Lalmonirhat	Parbatipur
64	Lalmoni Commuter	Parbatipur	Lalmonirhat
65	Burimari Commuter-1	Lalmonirhat	Burimari
66	Burimari Commuter-2	Burimari	Lalmonirhat
69	Parbatipur Commuter (Off)	Lalmonirhat	Parbatipur
70	Parbatipur Commuter (Off)	Parbatipur	Lalmonirhat
71	Burimari Commuter-3	Lalmonirhat	Burimari
72	Burimari Commuter-4	Burimari	Lalmonirhat
75	Dholeshwari Mail	Mymensingh	Bhaupur
76	Dholeshwari Mail	Bhaupur	Mymensingh
77	Rohanpur Commuter	Rajshahi	Rohanpur
78	Rohanpur Commuter	Rohanpur	Rajshahi
79	Laksam Commuter (Off)	Chattogram	Cumilla
80	Laksam Commuter (Off)	Cumilla	Chattogram
81	Chandpur Commuter (Off)	Chandpur	Laksam
82	Chandpur Commuter (Off)	Laksam	Chandpur
83	Chandpur Commuter (Off)	Chandpur	Laksam
84	Chandpur Commuter (Off)	Laksam	Chandpur
85	Noakhali Commuter (Off)	Noakhali	Laksam
86	Noakhali Commuter (Off)	Laksam	Noakhali
87	Noakhali Commuter (Off)	Noakhali	Laksam
88	Noakhali Commuter (Off)	Laksam	Noakhali
89	Cumilla Commuter (Off)	Cumilla	Dhaka
90	Cumilla Commuter (Off)	Dhaka	Cumilla
91	Mymensingh Commuter (Off)	Joydebpur	Mymensingh
92	Mymensingh Commuter (Off)	Mymensingh	Joydebpur
93	Sylhet Commuter (Off)	Akhaura	Sylhet
94	Sylhet Commuter (Off)	Sylhet	Akhaura
95	Betna Commuter-3	Khulna	Benapole
96	Betna Commuter-2	Benapole	Khulna
97	Kurigram Shuttle	Lalmonirhat	Kurigram
98	Kurigram Shuttle	Kurigram	Kaunia
99	Dohazari Commuter	Chittagong	Dohazari
100	Turag Commuter	Joydebpur	Kamalapur
