= Rajshahi railway station =

Railway station in Bangladesh

Rajshahi রাজশাহী
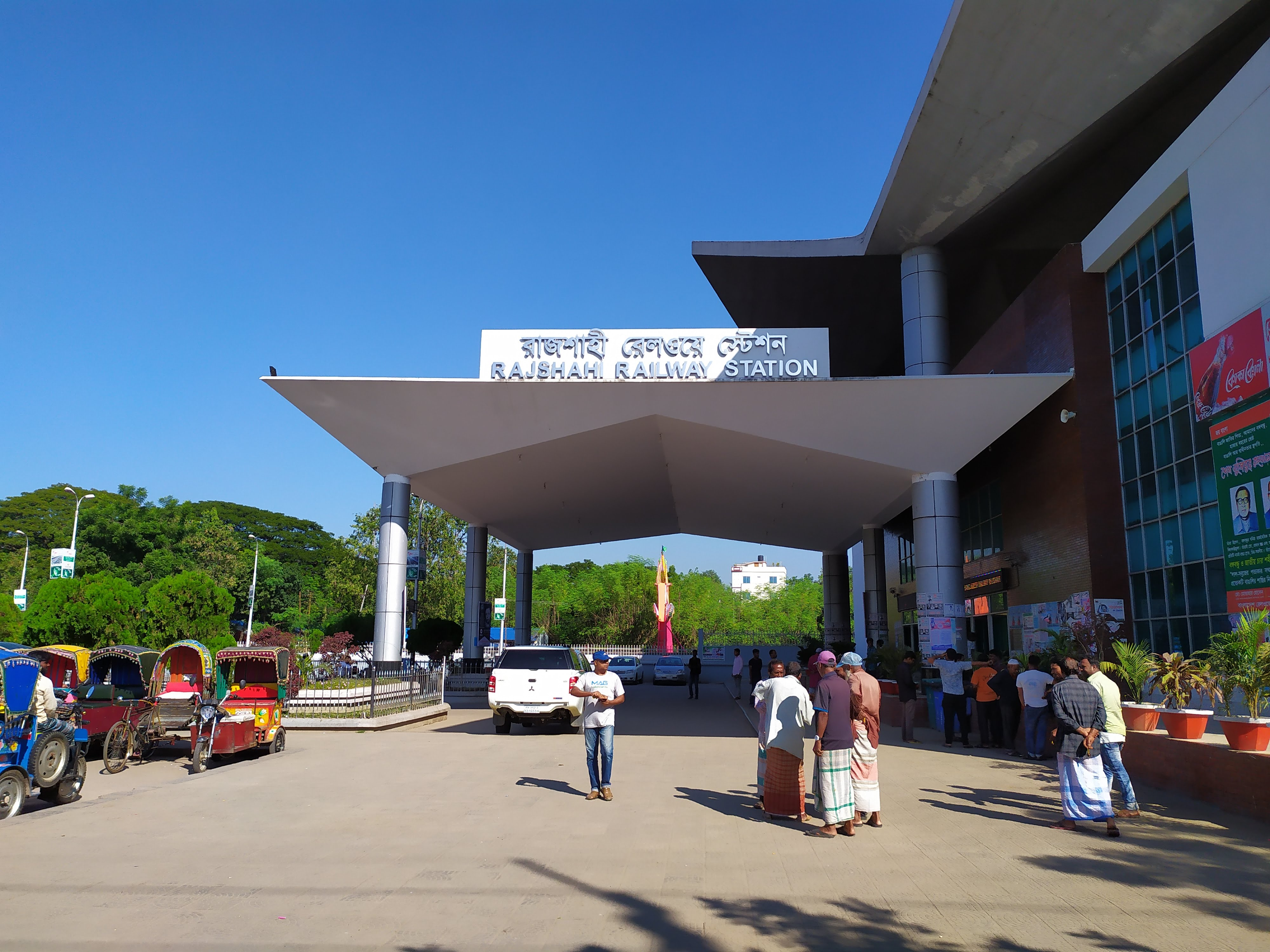
- Entrance of Rajshahi Railway Station

General information
- Location: Rajshahi; Bangladesh
- Coordinates: 24.374719°N 88.604780°E
- Owner: Bangladesh Railway
- Operator: Bangladesh Railway
- Line: Old Malda–Abdulpur line
- Platforms: Double island platforms
- Tracks: 8

Construction
- Structure type: Standard (on ground station)
- Parking: Yes
- Cycle facilities: Yes
- Accessible: Disabled access Computerized Ticketing Counters Luggage Checking System Food Plaza Kiosks WC Taxi Stand Public Transportation

Other information
- Status: Functioning
- Station code: RAJ

History
- Opened: 1930; 96 years ago
- Rebuilt: 2003
- Former names: Eastern Bengal Railway

Services
Preceding station	Bangladesh Railway	Following station
Rajshahi Court towards Old Malda Junction	Old Malda–Abdulpur	Rajshahi University towards Abdulpur Junction
Location

Rajshahi Railway Station is a railway station at Rajshahi, Bangladesh. The railway station is the main station of the city, and links to Dhaka via the Iswardi–Sirajganj line. The station is one of the most modern, largest and important stations of Bangladesh Railway along with Dhaka and Chittagong railway station. Headquarter of West Zone of Bangladesh Railway is also located within the station complex.

== History ==
In 1878, the railway route from Kolkata, then called Calcutta, to Siliguri was in two laps. The first lap was a 185 km journey along the Eastern Bengal State Railway from Calcutta Station (now Sealdah) to Damookdeah Ghat on the southern bank of the Padma River, then across the river in a ferry and the second lap of the journey. A 336 km metre gauge line of the North Bengal Railway linked Saraghat on the northern bank of the Padma to Siliguri.

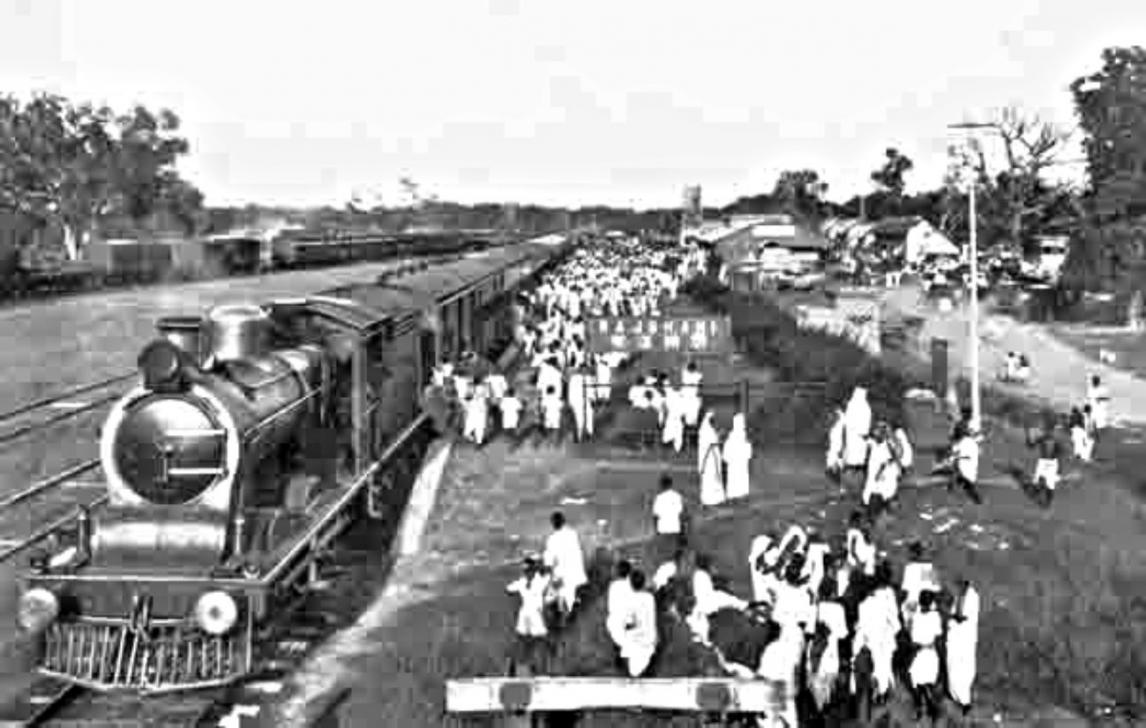
Rajshahi railway station during 1930s

Kolkata-Siliguri main line was converted to broad gauge in stages. The Hardinge Bridge was opened in 1915, while Sara-Sirajganj line was constructed by the Sara-Sirajganj Railway Company in 1915–1916. Then in 1930 Abdulpur-Amnura broad gauge was opened as a branch from Sara-Sirajganj line. Rajshahi railway station was opened as a station of Abdulpur-Amnura branch line. The station terminal building, platform and yard was remodeled and revamped in 2003.

== Infrastructure ==
The structure of Rajshahi railway station is like a bird from the front. In front of the main entrance of the station there is a large parking lot for cars and other vehicles. There are restrooms and ticket counters on the right side of the main platform. On the left, there is another lounge for male passengers, a railway inquiry, a food restaurant, a bookstore and two fast food outlets. What makes the platform different, is its specialized roof. Instead of the traditional concrete roof, the roof is covered with a few different types of plastic with a few triangular shaped parts.

The main building has three floors with a total of six platforms. There is a mosque on the second floor on the left and a residential hotel on the second and third floors. The platform can be entered through two entrances on either side of the railway station. Here is also another platform which is not directly connected with the main station build. Mostly local trains from Chapainawabganj/ Rohanpur stopped there.
Train wash pits and carriage shops are located in the station yard. The wash pit is fully automatic.

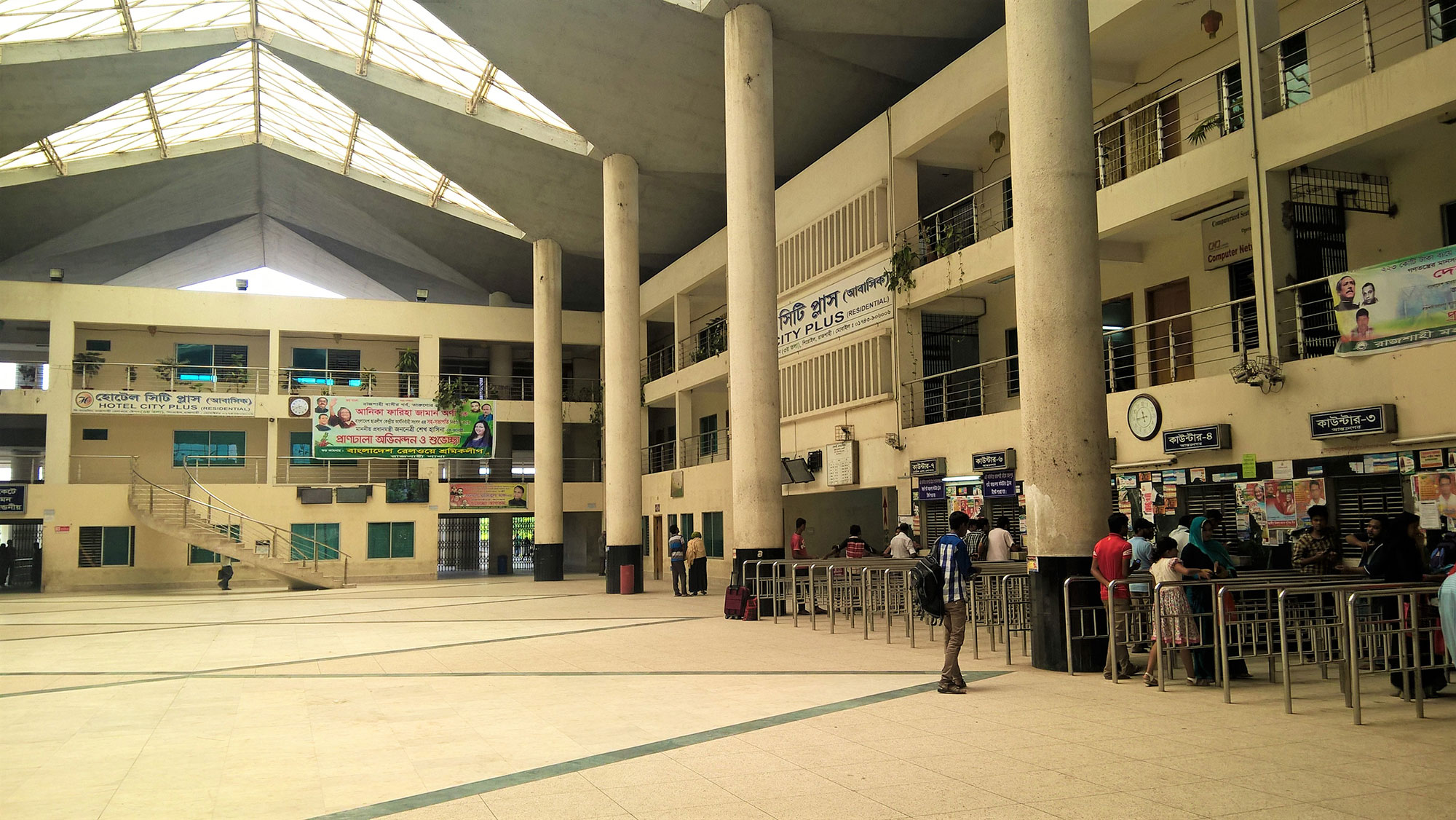
Inner side of the main station building

== Train services ==
Several trains from Rajshahi Railway Station to Dhaka, North Bengal and South Bengal run daily through this station. Five inter-city train services are operated by Bangladesh Railway, named "Silk City Express", "Padma Express" and "Dhumketu Express", "Banalata Express", and "Madhumati Express" between Dhaka and Rajshahi regularly from this station. "Banalata Express", which is first ever non-stop train service on Dhaka-Rajshahi route connects this station with Dhaka and Chapainawabganj. "Barendra Express" and "Titumir Express" trains travel to Chilahati in the Nilphamari and "Banglabanha Express" to Panchagarh. "Kapotaksha Express", "Sagardari Express", and "Tungipara Express" - these three trains travel to Khulna and Gopalganj in South Bengal. Several mail trains like "Rajshahi Express", "Mohananda Express", "Uttara Express", "Rajshahi commuter" trains run daily to Dhaka, Only One Train To Train To Dhalachar Was "Dhalachar Express", an direct train. Khulna and different direction of Bangladesh. Apart from this, local trains of several routes including Ishwardi, Chapainawabganj also run regularly from this station. To transport Mango and other agricultural products a special parcel train "Mango Special" runs between the capital and Chapainawabganj through Rajshahi.

International freight trains passes through this station before/after transit between Rohanpur and Singhabad. International passenger train service from Rajshahi to Kolkata is expected to be inaugurated.

== Train schedule ==
=== Intercity trains ===
Train No	Name	Off Day	From	Departure	To	Arrival
716	Kapotaksha Express	Tuesday	Rajshahi	14:30	Khulna	20:10
731	Barendra Express	Sunday	Rajshahi	15:00	Chilahati	21:25
733	Titumir Express	Wednesday	Rajshahi	06:20	Chilahati	13:00
754	Silkcity Express	Sunday	Rajshahi	07:40	Dhaka	13:30
756	Madumati Express	Thursday	Rajshahi	06:40	Dhaka	14:00
760	Padma Express	Tuesday	Rajshahi	16:00	Dhaka	21:40
762	Sagardari Express	Monday	Rajshahi	06:00	Khulna	12:10
770	Dhumkatu Express	Wednesday	Rajshahi	23:20	Dhaka	04:45
779	Dhalarchar Express	Monday	Rajshahi	10:35	Chapainawabganj	11:50
780	Dhalarchar Express	Monday	Rajshahi	17:00	Dhalarchar (Pabna)	20:15
784	Tungipara Express	Monday	Rajshahi	15:30	Gobra	22:25
791	Banalata Express	Friday	Rajshahi	18:25	Chapainawabganj	19:30
792	Banalata Express	Friday	Rajshahi	07:00	Dhaka	11:30
803	Banglabandha Express	Friday	Rajshahi	21:00	B Sirajul Islam (Panchagarh)	05:10

=== Mail/Express and mail trains ===
Train No	Name	Off Day	From	Departure	To	Arrival
5	Rajshahi Express	No	Rajshahi	20:15	Chapainowabgonj	22:30
6	Rajshahi Express	No	Rajshahi	10:15	Iswardi	12:40
15	Mohananda Express	No	Rajshahi	19:45	Chapainowabgonj	21:20
16	Mohananda Express	No	Rajshahi	07:15	Khulna	16:40
31	Uttara Express	No	Rajshahi	12:30	Parbatipur	20:05
563	Local	No	Rajshahi	06:10	Rohanpur	08:30
564	Local	No	Rajshahi	21:30	Ishurdi	23:20
565	Local	No	Rajshahi	13:00	Chapainowabgonj	14:00

=== Commuter and shuttle trains ===
Train No	Name	Off Day	From	Departure	To	Arrival
57	Rohanpur Commuter	Tuesday	Rajshahi	09:15	Rohanpur	11:10
77	Rohanpur Commuter	Tuesday	Rajshahi	15:00	Rohanpur	16:40
78	Iswadi Commuter	Tuesday	Rajshahi	18:30	Iswadi	21:00
Shuttle 1	Chapainowabgonj Shuttle 1	No	Rajshahi	5:50	Chapainowabgonj	07:15
Shuttle 1	Chapainowabgonj Shuttle 3	Wednesday	Rajshahi	17:15	Chapainowabgonj	18:40

=== Goods trains ===
Train No	Name	Off Day	From	Departure	To	Arrival	Comment
	Mango Special 1	No	Rajshahi	08:55	Chapainowabgonj	10:15	
	Mango Special 2	No	Rajshahi	17:50	Dhaka	01:00	

== Gallery ==
Entrance of Rajshahi Railway Station

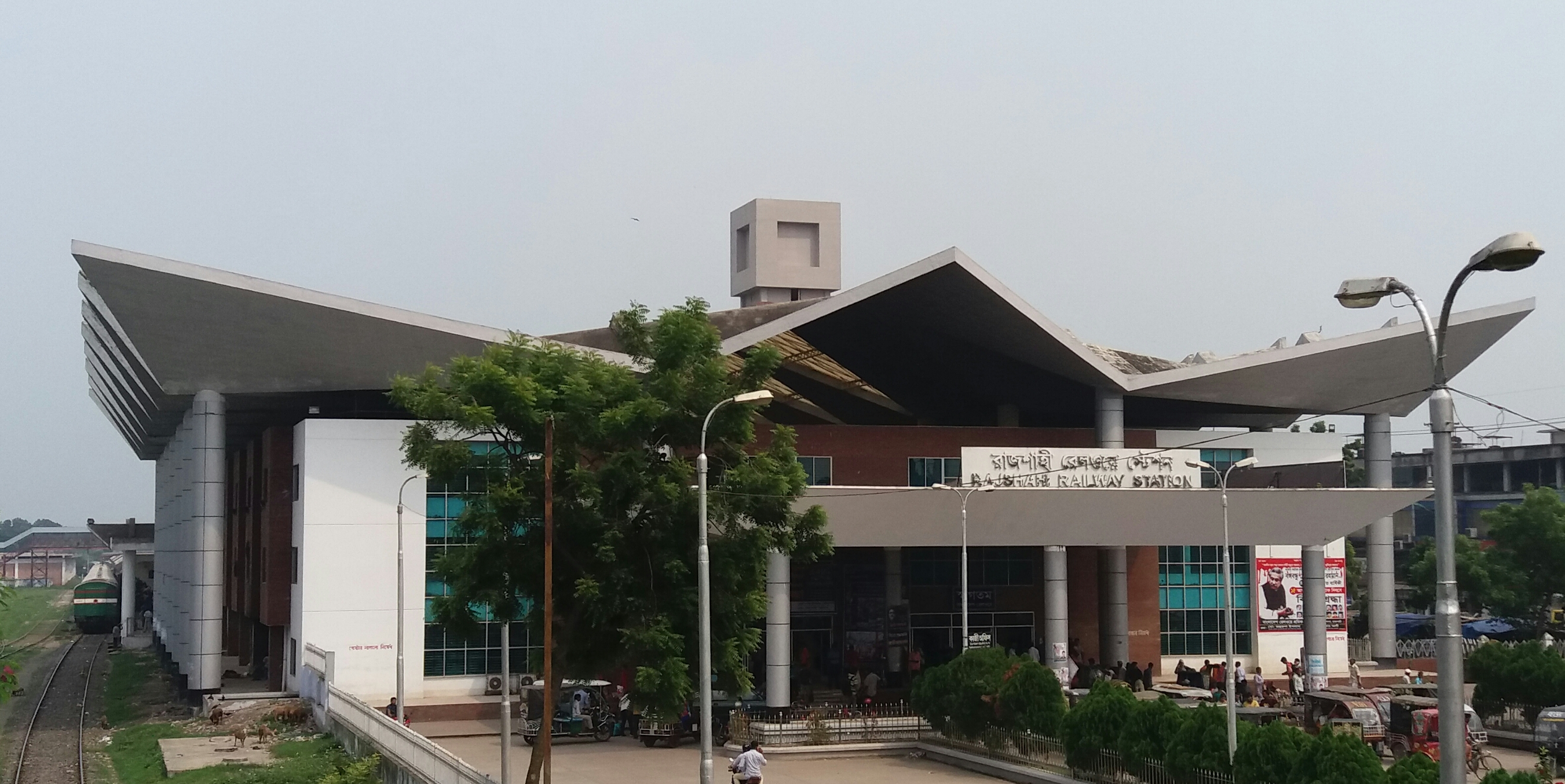
Rajshahi Railway Station

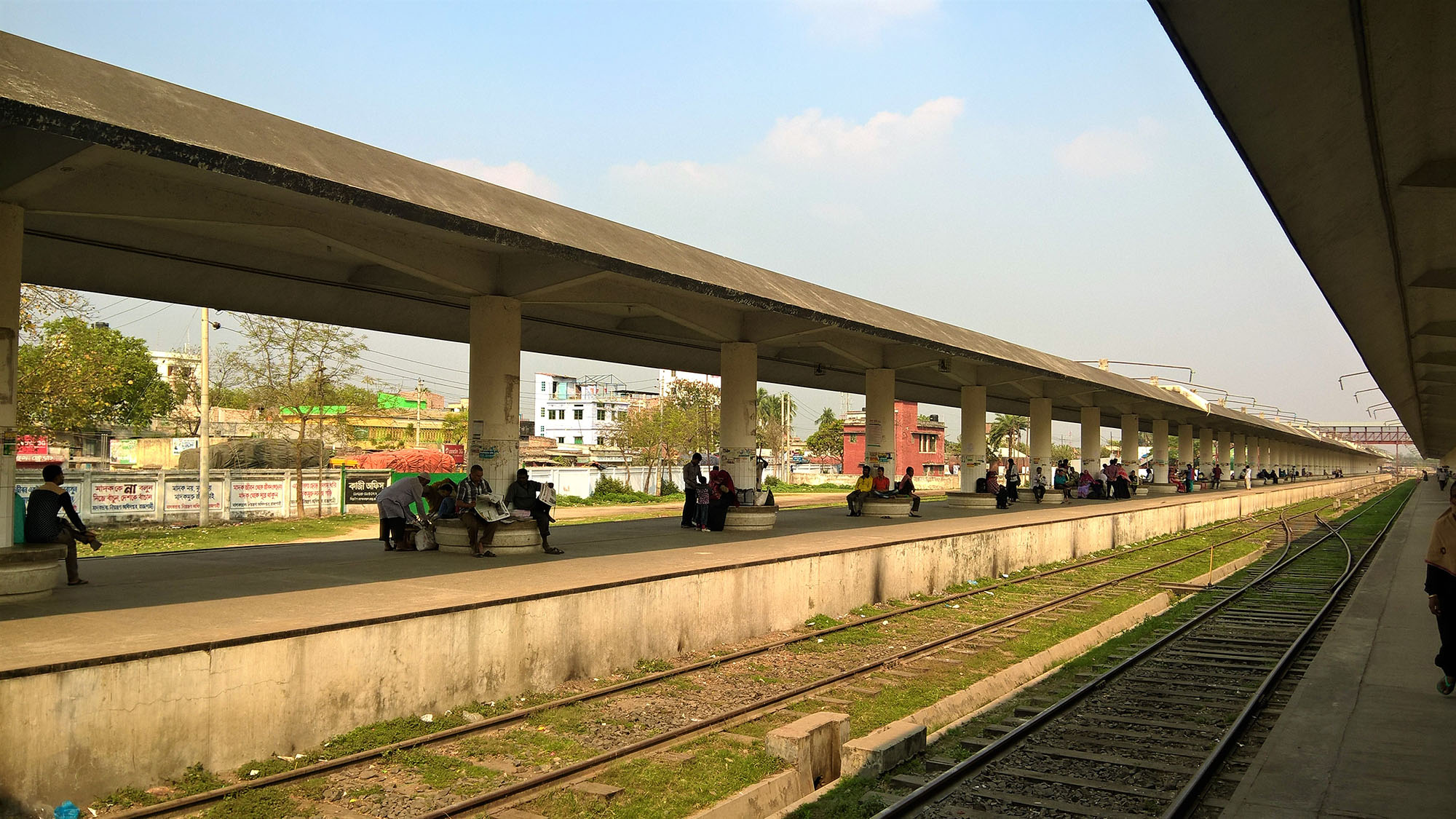
Platform of Rajshahi Railway Station

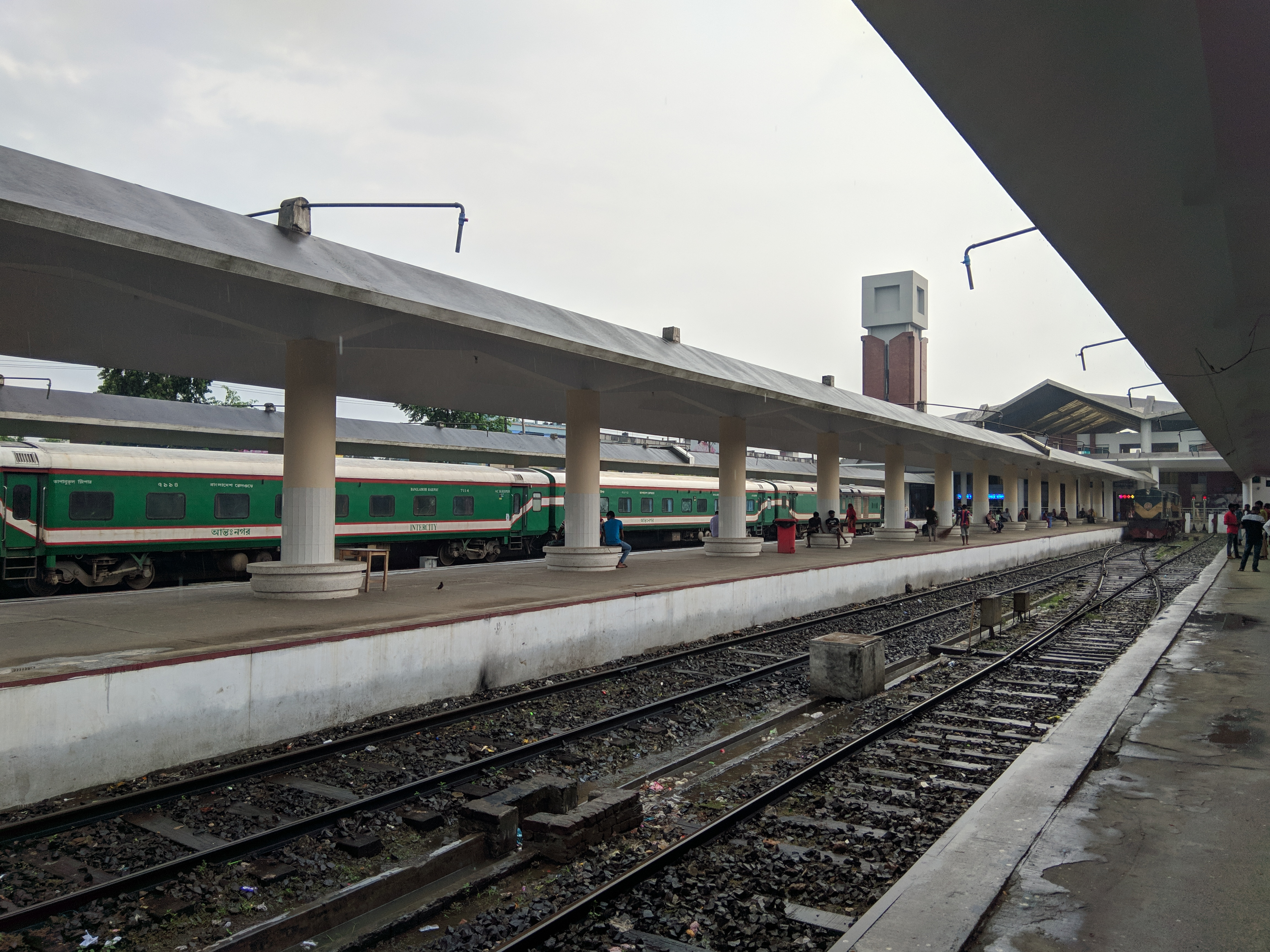
Platform of Rajshahi Railway Station

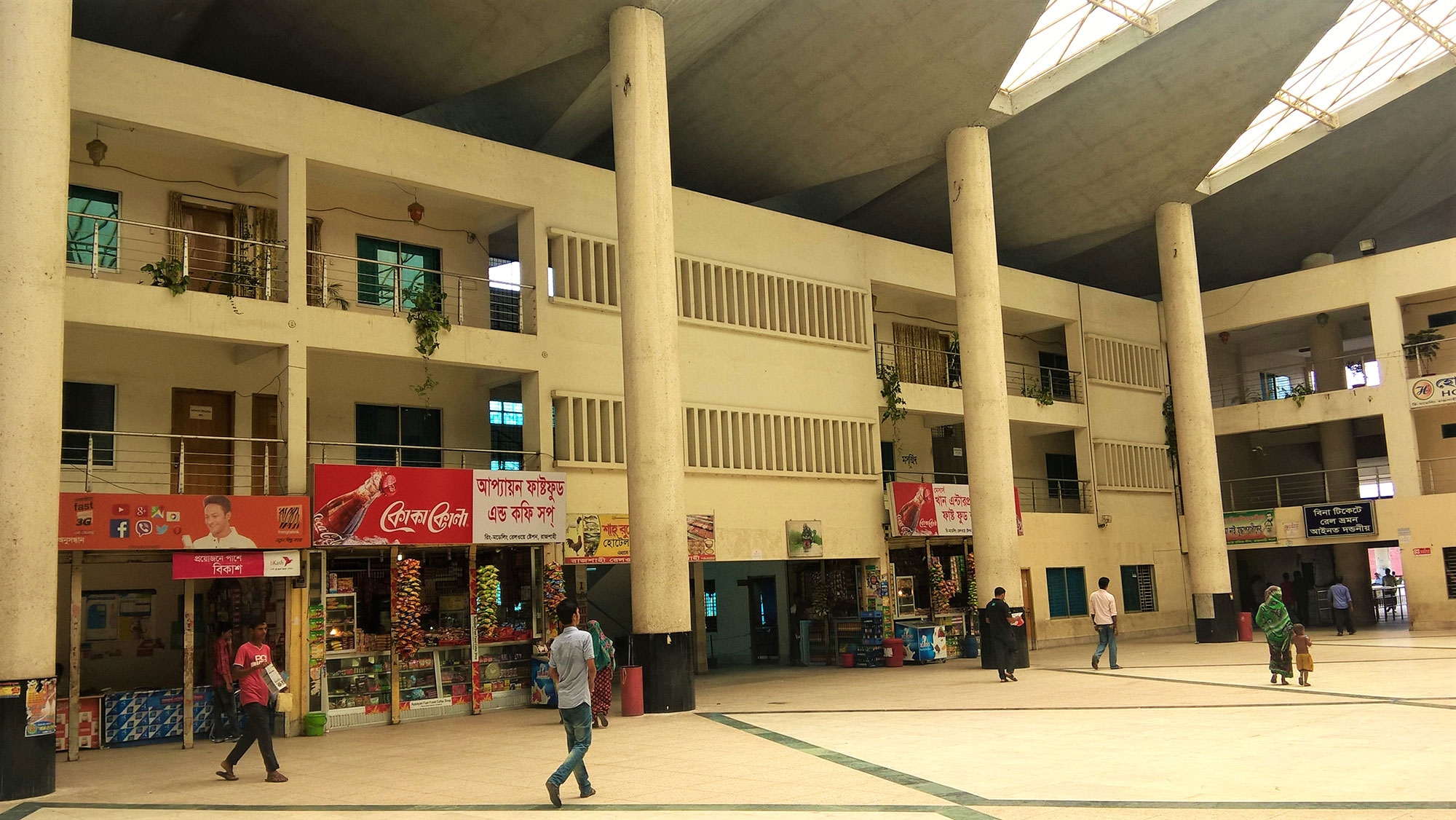

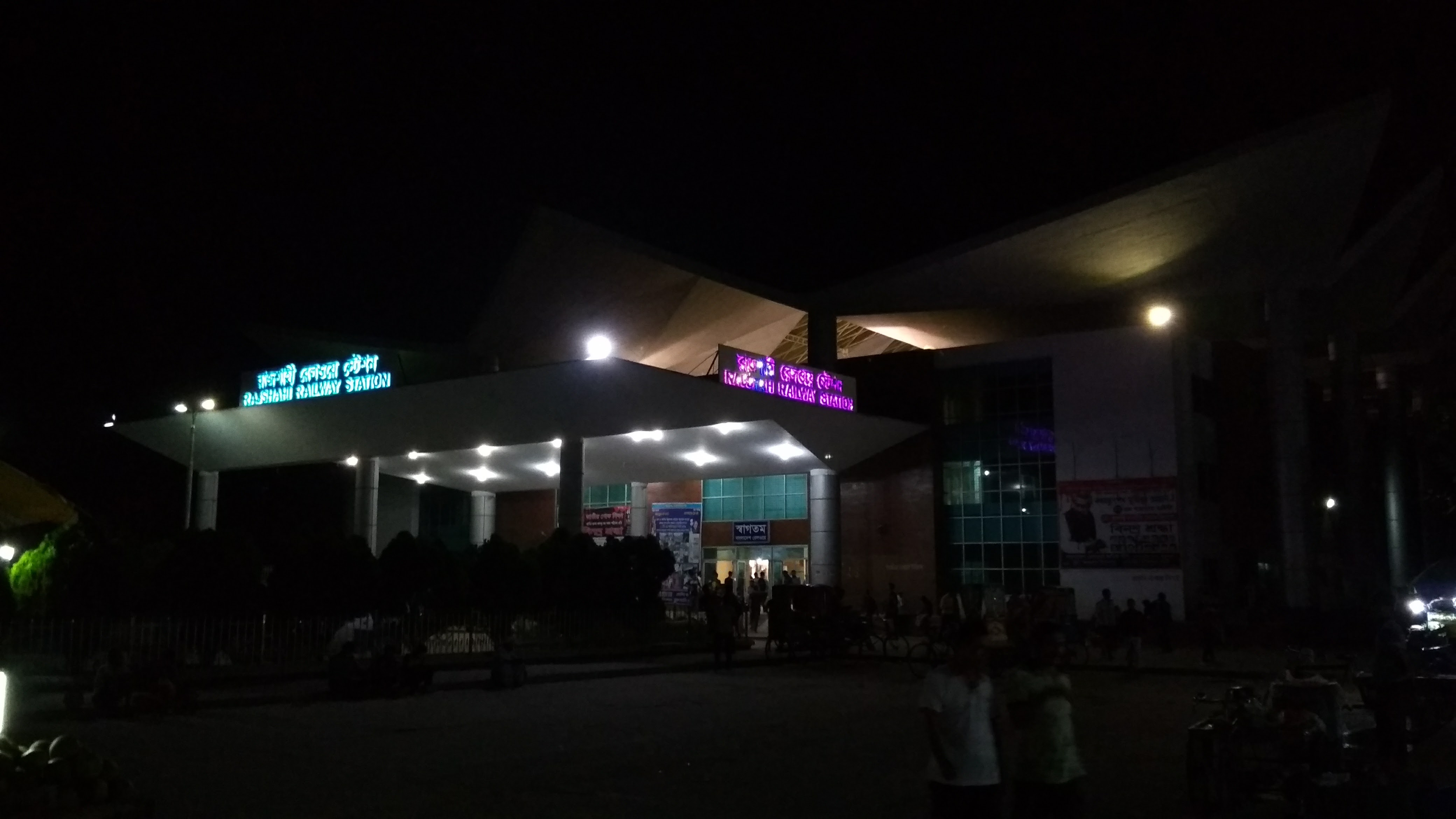
Rajshahi Railway Station at night

== See also ==
- List of railway stations in Bangladesh
