= Cross-border railway lines in India =

Indian Railways jointly operates passenger and freight services with its neighboring countries to connect the railway network in India. Railway line construction, maintenance, border check point management is also carried out with partner railway agencies and other government agencies. Some of the railway lines & services are operational while some are non-operational or in proposal or planning stages.

== India-Afghanistan ==
While India officially considers Afghanistan a "contiguous neighbor" due to its claim over Gilgit-Baltistan (bordering the 106 km Wakhan Corridor), this territory is currently under disputed Pakistani administration, presently making a direct physical link impossible for India to build or operate. There is no active or proposed railway line connecting India directly to Afghanistan through the Wakhan Corridor. Instead, India’s rail connectivity strategy for Afghanistan focuses on the following multilateral transit routes that bypass Pakistan, primarily through Iran and Central Asia.

- Chabahar–Zahedan–Zaranj line: This serves as India's primary strategic alternative to the land route through Pakistan. India initially partnered with Iran to construct a 628 km rail line from Chabahar Port to Zahedan near the Afghan border. Following geopolitical and funding delays, Iran proceeded with independent construction; as of early 2025, the project was reported to be approximately 84% complete.
- Trans-Afghan Railway: A proposed corridor connecting Termez (Uzbekistan) to Peshawar (Pakistan) via Kabul. While India is not a primary lead, Uzbekistan has invited Indian participation to facilitate trade access to Central Asian markets.
- Khaf–Herat line: This operational 225 km line connects the Iranian rail network to Herat in western Afghanistan. In February 2025, India successfully completed its first rail transit of commercial cargo to Afghanistan using this corridor via the Iranian network.

== India–Bangladesh ==
Following table lists current, historical and future routes, passenger train services and freight services:

Crossing Point (India)	Crossing Point (Bangladesh)	Status	Current train services	Historical train services	Ref
Gede, West Bengal	Darshana	Active	Maitree Express and freight trains	East Bengal Express, East Bengal Mail	
Petrapole, West Bengal	Benapole	Active	Bandhan Express and freight trains	Barisal Express	
Singhabad, West Bengal	Rohanpur	Active	Freight trains only		
Radhikapur, West Bengal	Biral	Active	Freight trains only		
Haldibari, West Bengal	Chilahati	Active	Mitali Express		
Changrabandha, West Bengal	Burimari	Inactive			
Karimganj, Assam	Kulaura	Planned			
Mahisasan, Assam	Shahabaz Pur	Being restored			
Agartala, Tripura	Akhaura	Active			
Belonia, Tripura	Feni	Under construction			

== India–Bhutan ==
Two rail routes have been planned:

Proposed Route	Details
Rangiya-Darrang-Samdrup Jongkhar	The total route length of 48 km is estimated to cost INR 9,010 million. The survey was completed in 2007-08 and the cost was updated in 2013–14
Kokrajhar-Gelephu	The total route length of 58 km is estimated to cost INR 5,540 million. The survey was completed in 2007-08 and the cost was updated in 2013–14

== India-China ==
Kunming-Kolkata line (BCIM Economic Corridor)
The most frequently discussed proposal is a high-speed link between Kunming (China) and Kolkata (India) as part of the Bangladesh, China, India and Myanmar Economic Corridor (BCIM) which is a proposed road, rail, water and air link connecting India and China through Myanmar. There is no proposal for a direct cross-border railway line between India and China due to long-standing border disputes and seurity concerns. Instead, both nations are rapidly constructing extensive "strategic" rail networks on their respective sides of the Line of Actual Control.

== India–Myanmar ==
Jiribam-Moreh-Tamu line
Moreh, Manipur, India – Tamu, Myanmar route is often considered as part of Trans-Asian rail connectivity. Currently India is building the Jiribam–Imphal–Moreh railway line.

Aizawl-Zorinpui line to connect Kaladan Multi-Modal Transit Transport Project
This line is under planning.

== India–Nepal ==
Jaynagar–Bardibas railway line is a semi-operational line between India and Nepal. DEMU passenger service is operation on this route.

Following table lists current and future routes:

Starting Point (India)	Ending Point (Nepal)	Status	Details	Ref
Jaynagar	Bardibas	Active	Currently active till Kurtha, Janakpur, planned extension till Bardibas in Nepal	
Raxaul	Kathmandu	Under Survey	Crossing point Birgunj in Nepal	
New Jalpaiguri, West Bengal	Kakarbhitta	Planned		
Jogbani	Biratnagar	Under Construction		
Nautanwa	Bhairhawa	Planned		
Nepalgunj road, Rupaidiha	Nepalgunj	Planned		

== India–Pakistan ==
Currently two rail routes exits between India and Pakistan. However the passenger train services are cancelled until further orders. Details below:

Crossing Point (India)	Crossing Point (Pakistan)	Status	Current train services
Atari Shyam Singh railway station	Wagah railway station	Inactive	Samjhauta Express
Munabao railway station	Zero Point railway station	Inactive	Thar Express

== India–Sri Lanka ==
Indo-Ceylon Boat Mail Express was an express train service which used to run between India and Sri Lanka until 1984. However, the train currently runs till Rameswaram in India.

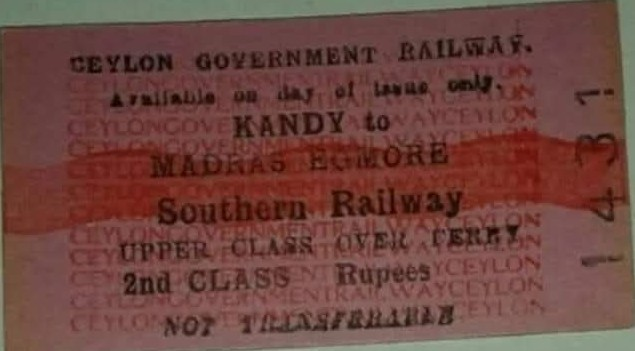
INDO-CEYLON BOATMAIL EXPRESS SINGLE JOURNEY TICKET BY CEYLON GOVERNMENT RAILWAY AND SOUTHERN RAILWAY. TICKET BOOKED BETWEEN KANDY AND MADRAS

== See also ==
- Rail transport in India
  - Future of rail transport in India
  - List of railway lines in India
  - North Eastern Railway Connectivity Project in India
- Greater India
  - Borders of India
  - Exclusive economic zone of India
  - Indianisation
