= Laksam–Noakhali line =

Laksam-Noakhali line
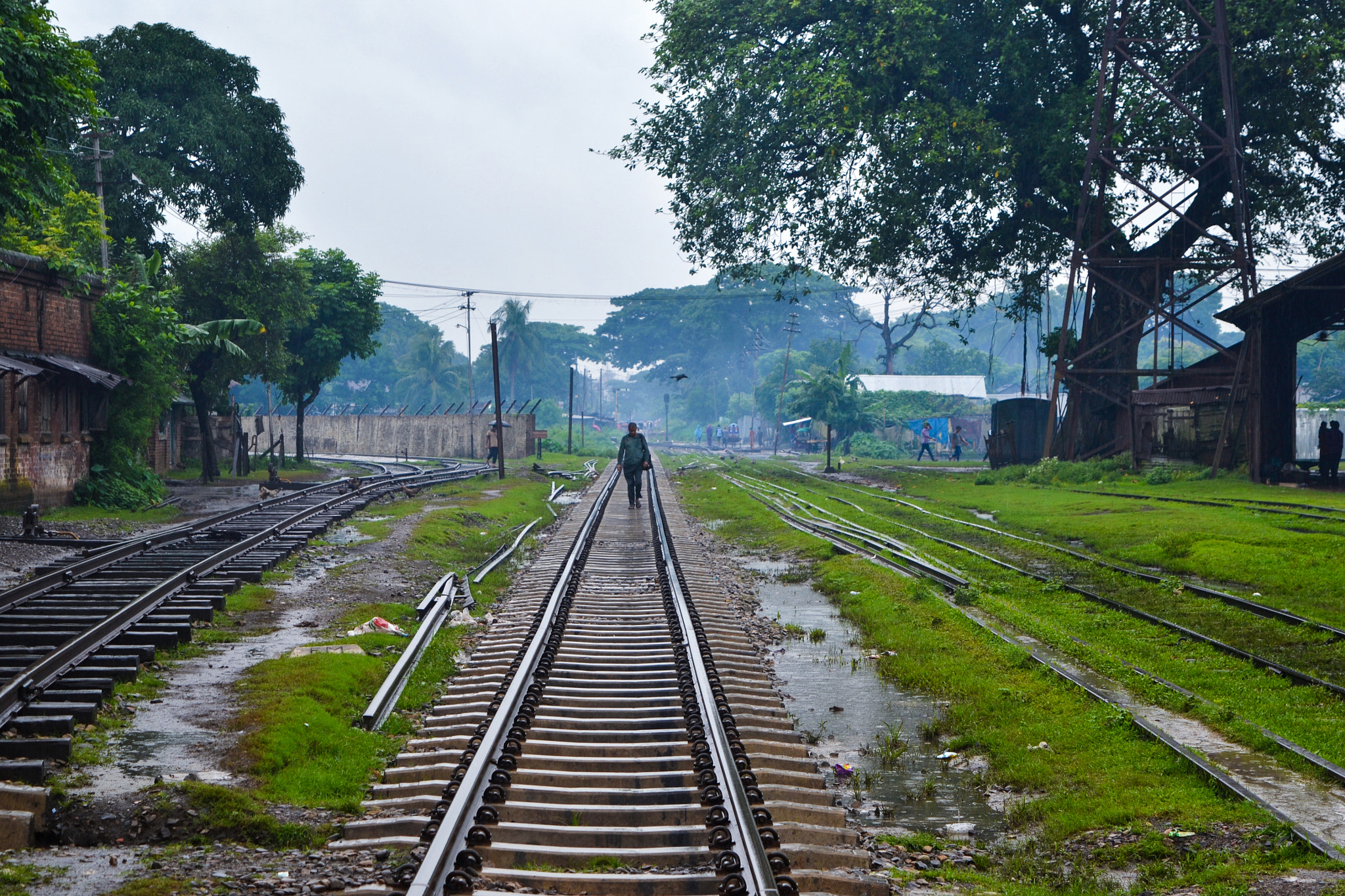

Overview
- Status: Active
- Owner: Bangladesh Railway
- Locale: Noakhali
- Termini: Laksam Junction Railway Station; Noakhali railway station
- Stations: 12

Service
- Type: Bangladesh metre gauge railway
- System: Bangladesh Railway
- Operator(s): Bangladesh Railway

Technical
- Line length: 50 km (31 mi)
- Number of tracks: 1
- Character: Open
- Track gauge: 1,000 mm (3 ft 3 3/8 in)

Laksam-Noakhali line is a meter-gauge line in Bangladesh operated by Bangladesh Railway. The line starts at Laksam Junction railway station and ends at Noakhali railway station.
