= Singhabad =

Singhabad Singabad
- Village
- Location in West Bengal, India Singhabad (India)
- Coordinates: 24.9183°N 88.2898°E
- Country: India
- State: West Bengal
- District: Malda

Population (2011)
  - Total: 1,951

Languages
  - Official: Bengali, English
- Time zone: UTC+5:30 (IST)
- PIN: 732132
- STD/ Telephone code: 03511
- Lok Sabha constituency: Maldaha Uttar
- Vidhan Sabha constituency: Habibpur
- Website: malda.nic.in

Singhabad (also spelled Singabad) is a village in Habibpur CD block in Malda Sadar subdivision of Malda district in the state of West Bengal, India. It is a railway transit point on the Bangladesh-India border.

== Geography ==
Cities, towns and locations in the northern portion of Malda district (including Chanchal subdivision and Old Malda, Habibpur, Bamangola and Gazole CD blocks)
M: municipal town, CT: census town, R: rural/ urban centre, F: Facility, H: historical centre
Owing to space constraints in the small map, the actual locations in a larger map may vary slightly

=== Location ===
Singhabad is located at 24.9183°N 88.2898°E.

=== Area overview ===
The area shown in the adjacent map covers two physiographic regions – the Barind in the east and the tal in the west. The eastern part is comparatively high (up to 40 metres above mean sea level at places) and uneven. The soils of the eastern region are "hard salty clays of a reddish hue and the ground is baked hard as iron." It lies to the east of the Mahananda River. The area lying to the west of the Mahananda River, the tal, is a flat low land and "is strewn with innumerable marshes, bils and oxbow lakes." The tal area is prone to flooding by local rivers. The total area is overwhelmingly rural. There are two important historical/ archaeological sites in the area – Pandua and Jagjivanpur.

Note: The map alongside presents some of the notable locations in the area. All places marked in the map are linked in the larger full screen map.

== Singhabad-Rohanpur transit facility ==
It is an active transit facility point. The corresponding station on the Bangladesh side is Rohanpur railway station in Nawabganj District.

As per the Memorandum of Understanding entered into by Bangladesh and India on 15 August 1978 it was agreed to facilitate overland transit traffic between Bangladesh and Nepal. An addendum was made on 6 September 2011, to add new rail routes for facilitating overland transit traffic between Bangladesh and Nepal.

Bangladesh started export of fertilizer to Nepal utilizing the Rahanpur-Singhabad transit point in November 2011. The Singhabad-Rohanpur transit point allows through transport of goods from Raxaul in Nepal to Khulna in Bangladesh, without any transhipment, but is rarely used.

== Land customs station ==
Singhabad has a land customs station for movement of goods by rail on the India-Bangladesh border.

== Demographics ==
As per the 2011 Census of India, Singabad had a total population of 1,951, of which 1.023 (52%) were males and 928 (48%) were females. Population below 6 years was 306. The total number of literates in Singhabad was 1,158 (70.40% of the population over 6 years).

== Transport ==
Singhabad railway station is on the Old Malda-Abdulpur line.
