= Kapotaksha Express =

Overview
- Service type: Intercity
- First service: 1 May 1986
- Current operator: West Zone

Route
- Termini: Khulna; Rajshahi
- Stops: 15
- Distance travelled: 263.2 km (163.5 mi)
- Average journey time: 5 hrs & 25 min
- Service frequency: 6 days a week (closed on Friday)

On-board services
- Classes: AC chair cars, non-AC chair cars
- Seating arrangements: Yes
- Catering facilities: Yes
- Entertainment facilities: Yes

Technical
- Track gauge: 1,676 mm (5 ft 6 in)

Kapotaksha Express (Bengali: কপোতাক্ষ এক্সপ্রেস) (Tr 715/716) is a Bangladeshi Intercity train service runs between the two western cities of Bangladesh Khulna and Rajshahi.

== History ==
The first inaugural run of Kapotaksha Express was on 1 May 1986. In 1988 the service was temporarily stopped. In late 1989 the service started again from Khulna to Rajshahi. Initially this train halted only in Jessore, Chuadanga and Ishwardi. Now it has 15 stoppages in between the routes.

This train was named after the Kapotaksha River.

== Schedule ==
This train departs Khulna at 6:45 am and reaches Rajshahi at 12:20 pm. The returning journey starts at 2:30 pm by departing Rajshahi and arrives at Khulna at 08:25 pm. This train reaches Jessore, Jhenaidah, Chuadanga, Kushtia, Pabna and Natore district. Its weekly off day is Friday.

== Facilities ==
The rake of Kapotaksha Express consists of 11 LHB COACHES. It has one AC chair car and eight8 non-AC chair cars with two power cars. In 2025 kopotoksha's coach was swiped with Madhumati Express (Rajshahi to Dhaka) and kapotakhsha get Indonesian Pt Inka coach of 2016. It usually gets American build emd GTL 42 ACL or class 6600 locomotives.

== Stoppages ==
- Nowapara
- Jessore Junction
- Mobarakganj
- Kotchandpur
- Safdarpur
- Darshana Halt
- Chuadanga
- Alamdanga
- Poradaha Junction
- Mirpur
- Bheramara
- Paksey
- Ishwardi Junction
- Azim Nagar
- Adbulpur Junction

== See also ==
- Sagardari Express
- Chitra Express
- Sundarban Express
