= Government Titumir College =

Public college in Dhaka, Bangladesh

Coordinates: 23°46′53″N 90°24′15″E

- সরকারি তিতুমীর কলেজ
- Crest of Government Titumir College
- Former name: Jinnah College
- Motto: জ্ঞানই শক্তি
- Motto in English: Knowledge is power
- Split from: Degree section of Jagannath College
- Type: Public College
- Established: 7 May 1968; 58 years ago
- Parent institution: Dhaka Central University
- Chancellor: President of Bangladesh
- Vice-Chancellor: Md. Lutfor Rahaman
- Principal: Sadruddin Ahmed
- Academic staff: 171
- Administrative staff: 250+
- Students: 27,884
- Undergraduates: 24,990
- Postgraduates: 2,894
- Location: Bir Uttam AK Khandakar Rd, Mohakhali, Dhaka, Bangladesh
- Campus: 4.5 hectares (11 acres); Urban
- Website: titumircollege.gov.bd

Government Titumir College (Bengali: সরকারি তিতুমীর কলেজ) (Dhaka Central University Attached: Government Titumir College, Dhaka) is a public educational institution in Bangladesh. It is located on the A.K. Khandakar Road in the Mohakhali, Dhaka. This college is named after Mir Nesar Ali Titumir, who was killed fighting against British colonial rule. It was affiliated with the University of Dhaka from February 2017 to January 2025.

== History ==
Old monogram of Government Titumir College

In 1968, to suppress the student movement in East Pakistan, the then-Governor of East Pakistan relocated the degree section of Jagannath College to Mohakhali and established it under the name 'Jinnah College'. In the turbulent days of Non Co-operation Movement on 3 March 1971, this college was named after Titumir. This was done on the eve of the meeting of Maolana Abdul Hamid Khan Bhashani and Sheikh Mujibur Rahman at Paltan Maidan. It was led by the important central member of Sarbadaliya Chhatra Sangram Parishad

The college was affiliated with the University of Dhaka from 2017 to January 2025.

=== Affiliation ===
- (7 May 1968 – 20 October 1992)- University of Dhaka
- (21 October 1992 – 15 February 2017) - National University of Bangladesh
- (16 February 2017 - 27 January 2025) - University of Dhaka

== Structure ==
As a government educational institution, it started as a degree (pass) college first. One of the important features of this college is to continue co-education in a congenial environment.

Intermediate course was introduced in this college in 1970. This college was acknowledged by the Dhaka Education Board on 19 May 1971. On 31 May 1972, honours courses were introduced in Bangla and chemistry department under the University of Dhaka. M.A. (part-1) was started in this college in English, political science, botany, zoology and maths subjects on 28 January 1995. Currently it provides honours and master's courses on Bangla, English, economics, political science, philosophy, sociology, social work, history, Islamic history & culture, Islamic studies, physics, chemistry, botany, zoology, maths, accounting, management, marketing and finance & banking. Moreover, it provides non-credit optional ICT subject for master's students.

== Faculties ==
=== Faculty of Arts & Social Science ===
- Department of Bangla
- Department of English
- Department of History
- Department of Islamic History & Culture
- Department of Philosophy
- Department of Islamic Studies
- Department of Economics
- Department of Political Science
- Department of Sociology
- Department of Social Work

=== Faculty of Science ===
- Department of Chemistry
- Department of Physics
- Department of Botany
- Department of Zoology
- Department of Statistics
- Department of Mathematics
- Department of Geography and Environmental Science
- Department of Psychology

=== Faculty of Business Studies ===
- Department of Accounting
- Department of Marketing
- Department of Management
- Department of Finance and Banking

== Notable alumni ==
- Md. Akabbar Hossain - member of parliament for the Tangail-7 constituency from 2001 to 2021
- Hasan Masood - actor
- Tipu Munshi - ex member of parliament, commerce minister of Bangladesh
- Reazul Mowla Rezu - film director
- Shatabdi Wadud - actor

== Controversies ==
On November 18, 2024, students blocked the Mohakhali railway line and surrounding roads demanding that Government Titumir College be upgraded to a university. During the blockade on 18 November 2024, students allegedly attacked the intercity train Upakul Express and Parabat Express by throwing bricks and stones, shattering windows and injuring several passengers. Many children were also injured during the attack. The incident disrupted train schedules and delayed other services, such as the Mohanganj Express and the Banalata Express, which were stuck due to the protest. The Dhaka Control Room of Bangladesh Railway reported that two more intercity trains were stranded in the Mohakhali area due to the protest. These trains were the Agnibina Express, bound for Tarakandi of Jamalpur District, and the Bonolota Express, coming from Chapainawabganj to Dhaka.
