= Biral railway station =

Railway station in Dinajpur District, Bangladesh

Biral বিরল

General information
- Location: Biral, Dinajpur; Bangladesh
- Coordinates: 25°37′56″N 88°33′05″E
- Line: Parbatipur–Panchagarh line

Construction
- Structure type: Standard (on ground station)

Other information
- Status: Functioning

History
- Opened: 1879
- Former names: Assam-Behar State Railway
Location
- Location within Bangladesh

Biral railway station (Bengali: বিরল রেলওয়ে স্টেশন) is a border railway station in Bangladesh, situated in Dinajpur District, in Rangpur Division. It is a defunct railway transit point on the Bangladesh-India border and is an India-Bangladesh land border checkpoint.

== History ==
Assam Behar State Railway extended the metre gauge railway from Parbatipur to Katihar, now in Bihar, India, in 1889.

== Biral-Radhikapur transit point ==
It was a defunct rail transit point on the Bangladesh-India border. The corresponding station on the Indian side is Radhikapur railway station in Uttar Dinajpur district, West Bengal. The transit facility in the Biral-Radhikapur sector had remained suspended since 1 April 2005. The railway track on the Indian side has been converted to 5 ft 6 in (1,676 mm) broad gauge while that on the Bangladesh side remained metre gauge.

The Radhikapur-Birol rail link was put back in operation in April 2017.

As per the Memorandum of Understanding entered into by Bangladesh and India on 15 August 1978 it was agreed to facilitate overland transit traffic between Bangladesh and Nepal. An addendum was made on 6 September 2011, to add new rail routes for facilitating overland transit traffic between Bangladesh and Nepal. The addendum read:
"1."Traffic in Transit” to/from Nepal and Bangladesh shall move through Indian territory by rail using Singhabad Railway station in India and Rohanpur Railway station in Bangladesh with their existing facilities. To ensure expeditious and smooth flow of such movement, necessary infrastructural facilities shall be provided by the two Parties within their respective territories.
"2.The existing rail route through Radhikapur Railway station in India and Birol Railway station in Bangladesh which has been suspended shall be brought into operation by converting Bangladesh portion into broad gauge. In this case, both the routes (proposed and the existing) shall be used for Nepal Transit Traffic by rail for additional operating convenience."

Bangladesh started export of fertilizer to Nepal utilizing the Rohanpur-Singhabad transit point in November 2011.

== Track conversions ==
The Parbatipur-Panchagarh and Kanchan-Biral lines are being developed as dual gauge tracks. The 9 km long track from Biral to the Bangladesh-India border is being converted to broad gauge at a cost of Tk 9.81 billion by the Western Zone of Bangladesh Railway.
