= Raxaul–Kathmandu railway line =

Railway line in India and Nepal

Raxaul–Kathmandu railway
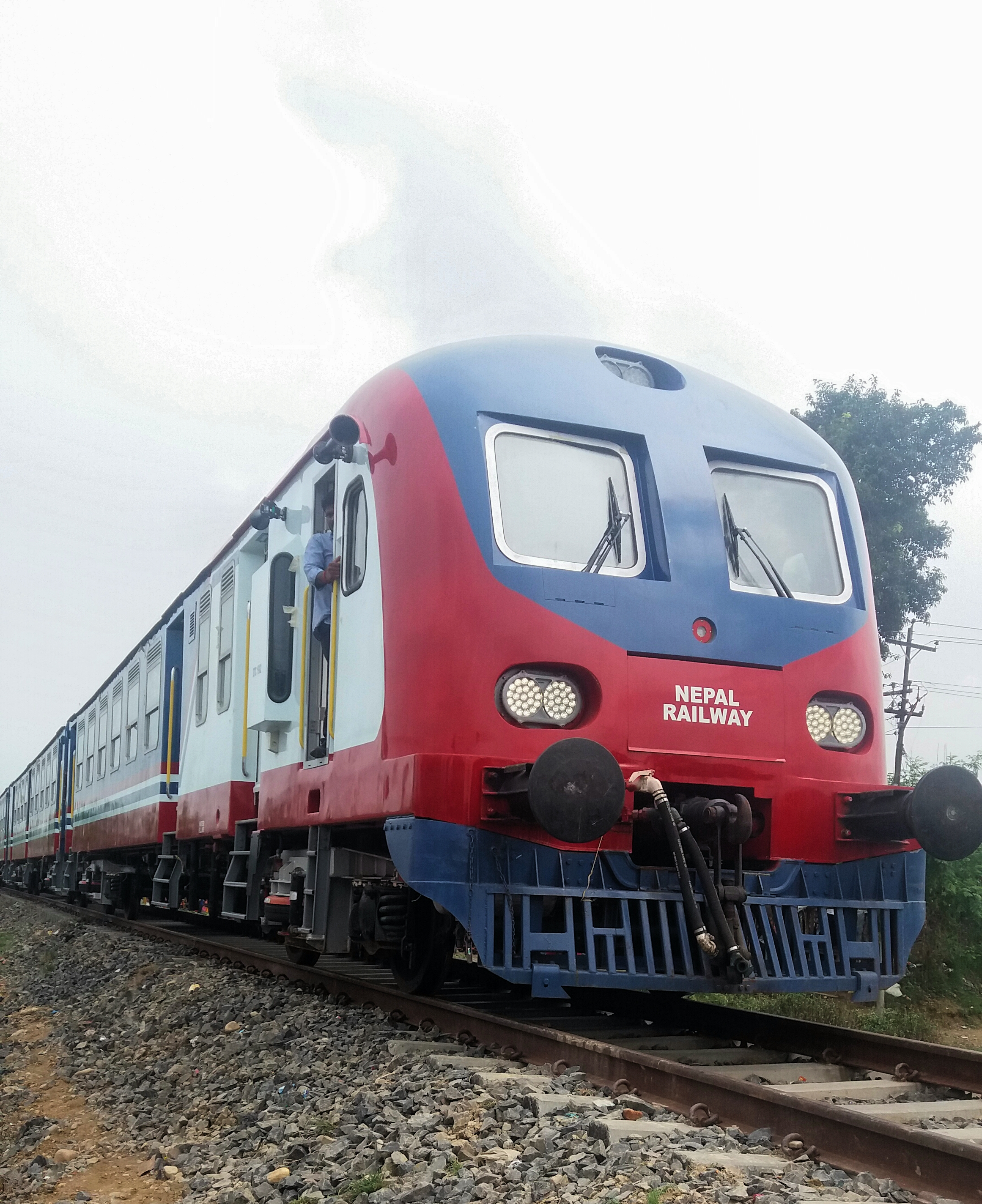
- An Engine of Nepal Railway

Overview
- Native name: भारत-नेपाल रेलवे
- Status: DPR ongoing
- Locale: India and Nepal
- Termini: Kathmandu, (Nepal); Raxaul, (India)
- Stations: Jitpur, Nijgadh, Shikharpur, Sisneri, Sathikhel, Chobhar
- Website: www.dorw.gov.np

Service
- Type: Government sector

History
- Commenced: 2018
- Opened: proposed

Technical
- Line length: 130 km (81 mi)
- Track gauge: 5 ft 6 in (1,676 mm)
- Conduction system: Electrified
- Operating speed: up to 120 km/h

The Raxaul–Kathmandu railway line is a proposed cross-border railway between India and Nepal. The governments of India and Nepal had issued a joint statement on expanding rail linkages with India's financial support, connecting the border city of Raxaul in India to Kathmandu in Nepal. Nepal signed a memorandum of understanding with India to prepare a detailed project report for a proposed railway linking the two towns, with an estimated cost around US$3 billion.

Konkan Railway Corporation conducted a preliminary engineering pre-feasibility study (cum traffic survey) of the proposed broad gauge (1,676 mm) railway project. According to the pre-feasibility study the railway line will start from Raxaul and pass through Jitpur, Nijgadh, Sikharpur, Sisneri and Sathikhel before connecting Chobhar and Kathmandu. The railway is proposed to be 113 kilometres (70 mi) long and have 41 bridges and 40 curves. Around 20 per cent of it will consist of tunnels and bridges. About 40 km section will have tunnels and 35 bridges have to be built in different places. The Detail Project Report (DPR) for the Raxaul–Kathmandu railroad is ongoing.

== Key features of the railway line ==
- Electrified railway line
- Total length 135 km
- 120 km/h speed
- Broad gauge 1676 mm (5'6")
- 41 major bridges
- 39 tunnels
- 13 stations
- Estimate cost INR 16550.446 CR(US$2.64 billion)

== See also ==
- Cross-border railway lines in India
- Railway stations in Nepal
- Nepal Railways
- Indian Railways
- Railway stations in India
