= Sagardari Express =

Bangladeshi Intercity train service

সাগরদাঁড়ী এক্সপ্রেস (transl. Sagardari Express)
Overview
- Service type: Intercity
- First service: 1 May 2007
- Current operator: West Zone

Route
- Termini: Khulna; Rajshahi
- Stops: 16
- Distance travelled: 263.2 km (163.5 mi)
- Average journey time: 5 hrs & 25 min
- Service frequency: 6 days a week (closed on Tuesday)
- Train number: 761/762

On-board services
- Classes: AC chair cars, non-AC chair cars
- Seating arrangements: Yes
- Catering facilities: Yes
- Entertainment facilities: Yes

Technical
- Track gauge: 1,676 mm (5 ft 6 in)

Sagardari Express (Bengali: সাগরদাঁড়ী এক্সপ্রেস) (Tr code 761/762) is a Bangladeshi Intercity train service runs between the two western cities of Bangladesh Khulna and Rajshahi.

== History ==
This train was inaugurated on 1 May 2007. Earlier, Kapotaksha Express started running between Rajshahi and Khulna city as a new intercity train called Sagardari Express considering the passenger pressure. It is named after Sagardari the birthplace of Michael Madhusudan Dutt.

== Stoppages ==
Sagardani Express give stoppage at the following locations:

- Nowapara Railway Station
- Jessore Junction railway station
- Mubarakganj Railway Station
- Kot Chandpur Railway Station
- Darshana Halt Railway Station
- Chuadanga Railway Station
- Alamdanga Railway Station
- Poradah Junction railway station
- Bheramara Railway Station
- Pakshi Railway Station
- Ishwardi Junction railway station
- Azimnagar Railway Station
- Abdulpur Junction railway station

This train leaves Khulna from 4:00 PM and reached Rajshahi at 10:00 PM according to the updated Sagarcdhari Express Train Schedule

== See also ==
- Kapotaksha Express
