= Dhalarchar Express =

Express train in Bangladesh

Overview
- Service type: Intercity
- Status: Active
- Locale: Rajshahi Division
- First service: July 15, 2018; 7 years ago
- Current operator: Bangladesh Railway

Route
- Termini: Dhalarchar railway station Chapainawabganj railway station
- Stops: 15
- Distance travelled: 135.13 kilometres (83.97 miles)
- Average journey time: 3 hours, 55 minutes
- Service frequency: 6 days per week (780 Wednesday off, 779 Thursday off)
- Train number: 779-780

On-board services
- Seating arrangements: Yes
- Sleeping arrangements: No
- Catering facilities: Yes
- Entertainment facilities: No
- Baggage facilities: Overhead racks

Technical
- Track gauge: Broadgauge
- Rake maintenance: Ishwardi Junction railway station
- Rake sharing: Dhalarchar Stuttle

The Dhalarchar Express (Train No. 779-780) is a train that runs from Dhalarchar to Chapainawabganj in Rajshahi Division. It is operated by Bangladesh Railway.

== History ==
After building the Majhgram-Dhalarchar line, This train starts its journey in 2018 as Pabna Express when it connect Rajshahi to Pabna.

After opening the Dhalarchar railway station the Pabna express expand its route from Pabna to Dhalarchar and Rajshahi to Chapainawabganj in 2020.
