= Chapainawabganj railway station =

Railway station in Rajshahi, Bangladesh

Chapainawabganj চাঁপাইনবাবগঞ্জ
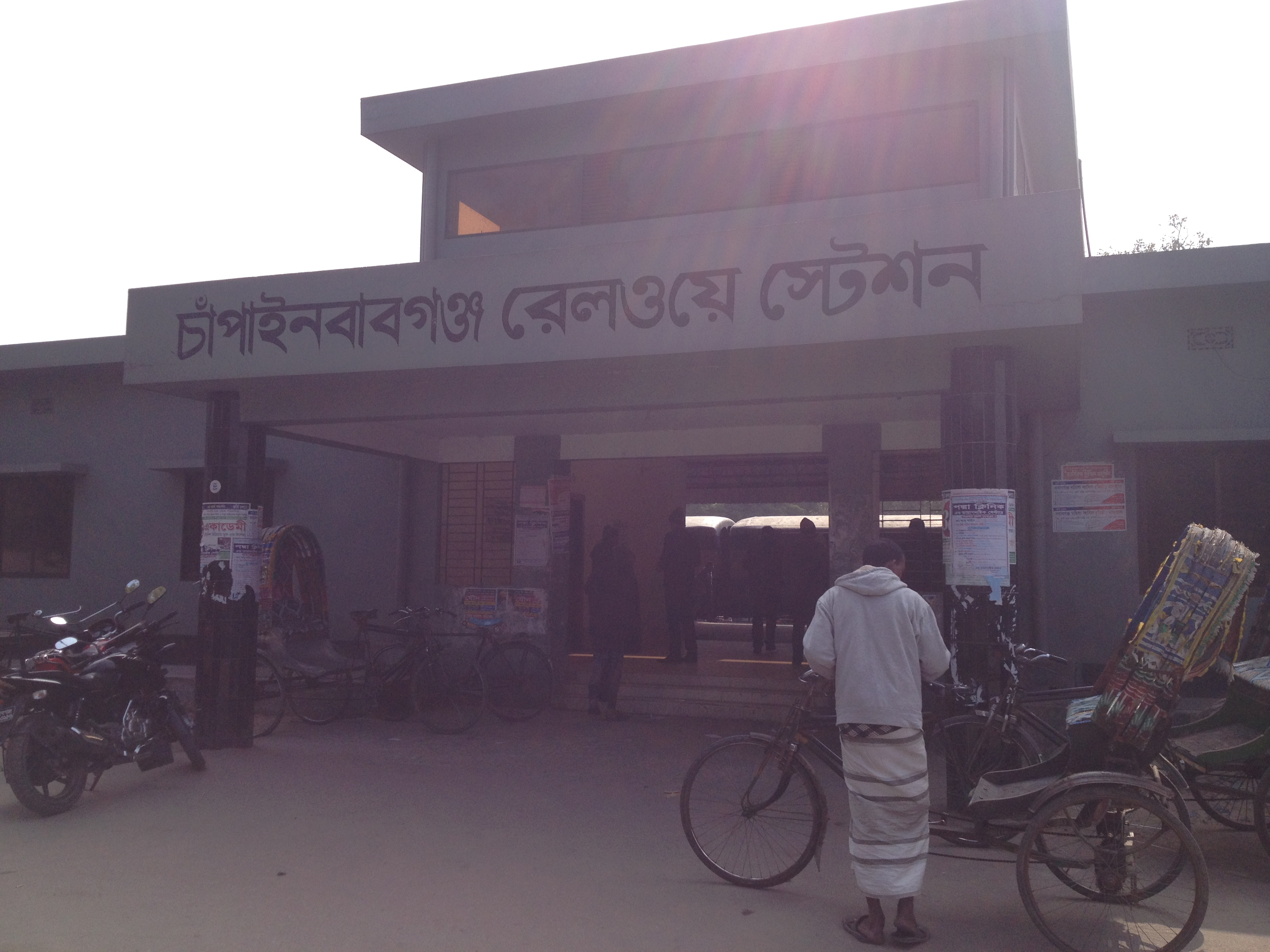
- Chapainawabganj Railway Station

General information
- Location: Chapainawabganj, Chapainawabganj District, Rajshahi Division; Bangladesh
- Coordinates: 24.59902°N 88.279992°E
- Owner: Bangladesh Railway
- Line: Old Malda–Abdulpur line
- Platforms: 2
- Tracks: 2

Construction
- Structure type: Standard (on ground station)
- Parking: Yes
- Cycle facilities: Yes
- Accessible: Yes

Other information
- Status: Opened
- Station code: NWB
- Zone(s): West Zone
- Division(s): Pakshi

History
- Opened: 1930; 96 years ago

Services
| Preceding station | Bangladesh Railway | Following station |
|---|---|---|
| Terminus | Old Malda–Abdulpur | Amnura Bypass towards Abdulpur Junction |
Location

Chapainawabganj railway station is a railway station in Chapai Nawabganj. This is a terminus station of Old Malda–Abdulpur line.
