= Upakul Express =

Intercity passenger train in Bangladesh

Overview
- Service type: Inter-city rail
- Status: Operating
- Current operator: East Zone (Bangladesh Railway)
- Daily ridership: 6 hours

Route
- Termini: Noakhali railway station Kamalapur railway station
- Stops: 14

On-board services
- Classes: Shovan Chair, Snigdha
- Seating arrangements: Yes
- Catering facilities: Yes
- Entertainment facilities: Yes

Technical
- Track gauge: Metre-gauge railway
- Operating speed: 70-80 km/h

Upakul Express (Train No. 711−712) is a passenger train running from Noakhali Railway Station to Dhaka Kamalapur Railway Station.[1] It was inaugurated on 17 January 1986. The train is currently in active service. This train connects Comilla, Brahmanbaria, Kishoreganj, Narsingdi, Gazipur and Dhaka districts along the route. It is called the second intercity metre gauge train.

== Schedule ==
Train No	Source	Departure	Destination	Entrance	Weekly holiday
711	Noakhali	06:00	Kamalapur	11:20	Wednesday
712	Kamalapur	15:10	Noakhali	20:40	Tuesday

== Stopover ==
(In some cases, the journey of a train may be changed by Bangladesh Railway. The following list is valid as of 2025.)

- Dhaka
- Biman Bandar
- Narsingdi Railway Station
- Bhairab Bazar Junction
- Ashuganj
- Brahmanbaria
- Akhaura Junction
- Quasba
- Cumilla
- Laksam Junction
- Natherpetua
- Sonaimuri
- Bajra
- Chowmuhani
- Maijdee Court
- Noakhali

== Events ==
- On February 14, 2022, the Upakul Express train service was upgraded to a white rake service to provide better facilities for passengers.
- On November 18, 2024, several people threw stones at the train, damaging twenty-nine windows across five coaches and injuring a few passengers.
- On December 7, 2024, a young man died after being run over by the Upakul Express train on its way from Dhaka to Noakhali.
