= Laksam–Chandpur line =

Laksam-Chandpur line
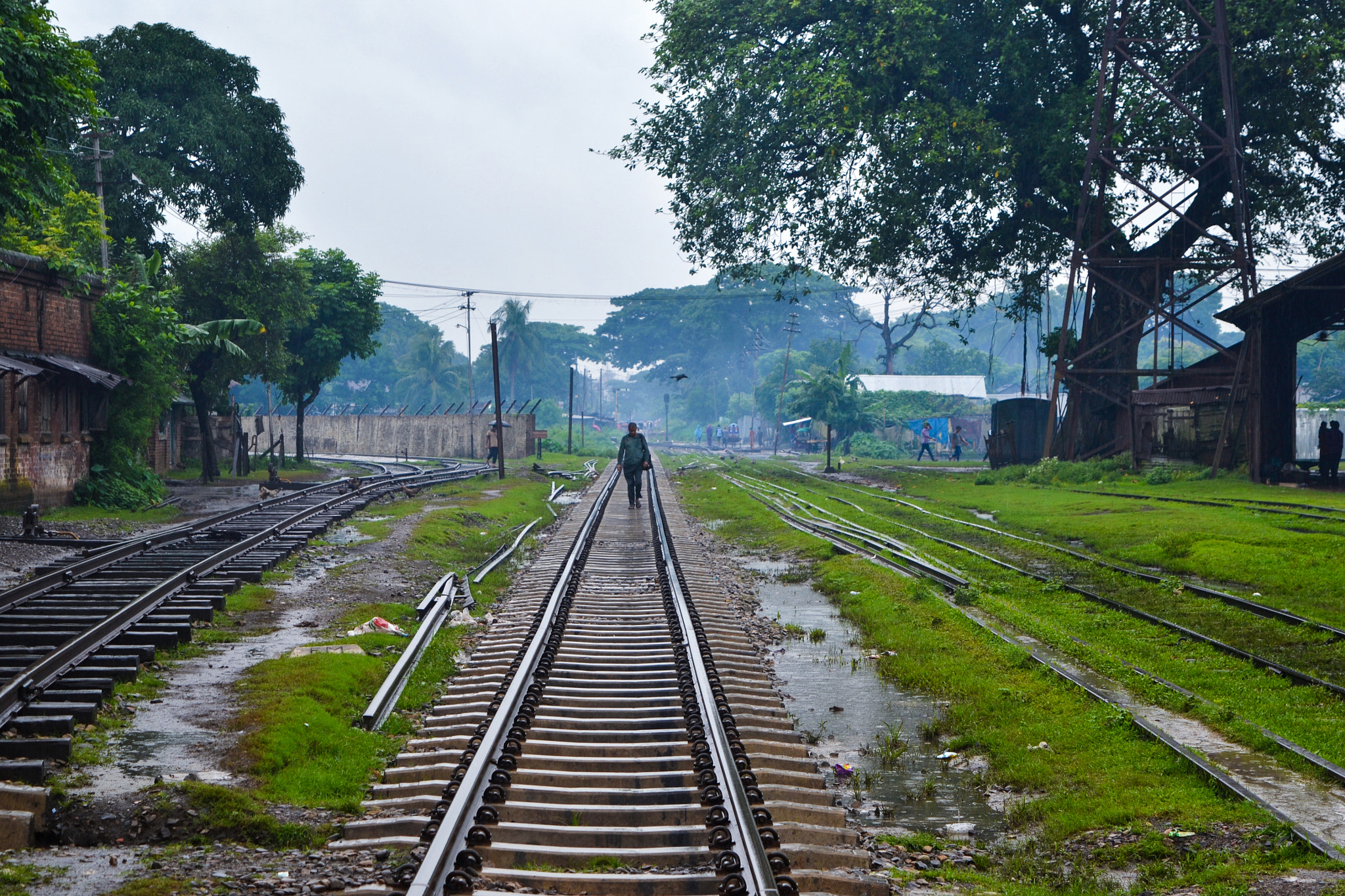

Overview
- Status: Active
- Owner: Bangladesh Railway
- Locale: Cumilla
- Termini: Laksam Junction Railway Station; Chandpur railway station
- Stations: 12

Service
- Type: Bangladesh meter gauge railway
- System: Bangladesh Railway
- Operator(s): Bangladesh Railway

Technical
- Line length: 69 km (43 mi)
- Number of tracks: 1
- Character: Open
- Track gauge: 1,000 mm (3 ft 3 3/8 in)

Laksam–Chandpur line is a meter-gauge railway in Bangladesh operated by Bangladesh Railway. It extends from Laksam Junction Railway Station in Comilla District to Chandpur Railway Station in Chandpur District. It is maintained and operated by Bangladesh Eastern Railway.

== Inauguration ==
The Assam Bengal Railway Company, formed in England in 1892, took charge of the construction of railways in the country. Under this company, 150 km railway line from Chittagong to Comilla and 69 km meter-gauge railway line from Laksam to Chandpur were inaugurated on 1 July 1895.

== List of stations ==
From east to west:

- Laksham Junction railway station
- Chitoshi Road railway station
- Shahrasti railway station
- Meher railway station
- Waruk railway station
- Haziganj railway station
- Balakhal railway station
- Madhuroad railway station
- Shahtali railway station
- Maishadi Halt railway station
- Chandpur Court railway station
- Chandpur railway station

== Rail service ==
The following passenger trains run on the Laksam-Chandpur railway line:

- Chandpur Commuter
- Meghna Express
- Sagarika Express

== Importance of double-line ==
Chandpur-1 member of parliament and former Home Minister Mohiuddin Khan Alamgir said the Chandpur-Laksam railway double line needs to be built to boost trade and commerce. This will further expand trade and commerce with the region and with India and restore the glory of business in Chandpur.
