= Barendra Express =

Express train in Bangladesh

বরেন্দ্র এক্সপ্রেস (transl. Barendra Express)
Overview
- Service type: Inter-city Train
- Current operator: Bangladesh Railway

Route
- Termini: Rajshahi Railway Station; Chilahati Railway Station
- Stops: saidpur
- Distance travelled: 526 km (327 mi)
- Average journey time: 6 hours, 30 minutes
- Service frequency: 6 Days (Sunday off day)
- Train number: 731/732

On-board services
- Class: First_Class_Seat Shovon_Seat Shovon
- Seating arrangements: Yes
- Sleeping arrangements: Yes
- Catering facilities: Yes

Technical
- Rolling stock: 12
- Track gauge: 1,676 mm (5 ft 6 in)
- Operating speed: 100 km/h (62 mph)

The Barendra Express is an inter-city train of Bangladesh Railway service. It gives service between Rajshahi and the northern Chilahati.

== Schedule and stations ==
The train departs from Chilahati at 05:00 am and arrives at Rajshahi at 11:10 pm. It departs from Rajshahi at 03:00 pm and reaches Chilahati at 09:30 pm. The Barendra Express is closed on Sundays during the week. The train stops at the following stations:-

- Rajshahi Railway Station
- Abdulpur Junction
- Natore
- Ahsanganj
- Santaher
- Accalpur
- Joypurhat
- Panchbibi
- Birampur
- Fulbari
- Parbatipur Junction
- Saidpur
- Nilphamari
- Domar
- Chilahati
