= Old Malda–Abdulpur line =

Railway line in India and Bangladesh

Overview
- Status: Functioning
- Owner: Bangladesh Railway; Indian Railways
- Locale: Bangladesh; India
- Termini: Abdulpur Junction railway station; Old Malda Junction railway station
- Stations: 26

Service
- Type: Railway line in Bangladesh and India

History
- Opened: 1930

Technical
- Track gauge: Broad-gauge, 1,676 mm (5 ft 6 in)
- Operating speed: 100 km/h

Old Malda–Abdulpur line was built in 1930 during the British Indian rule. At present, the Bangladesh part of the railway line is operated and maintained under Bangladesh Railway and the Indian part of the railway line is managed and maintained by Indian Railways.

== History ==
In 1878, the Howrah–New Jalpaiguri line was divided into two sections. The first leg was a 185 km journey on the East Bengal State Railway from Calcutta railway station (now Sealdah) to Damukdia Ghat on the south bank of the Padma River, followed by a second journey across the river by ferry. The North Bengal Railway's 336 km meter gauge line connected Saraghat on the north bank of the Padma with Siliguri. The Howrah–New Jalpaiguri main line was gradually converted to broad gauge. The Hardinge Bridge was opened in 1915, while the Saraghat–Sirajganj line was built by the Sara–Sirajganj Railway Company between 1915-16. Then in 1930, the Abdulpur–Amnura broad gauge line was opened as a branch of the Saraghat–Sirajganj line.

== Rohanpur–Singhabad transit ==
It is currently functioning as an active transit and is connected to Singhabad railway station in Malda district, India. The railway entered India for the transport of goods from Bangladesh to Nepal through an agreement signed on 15 August 1978. A new route between Bangladesh and India was provided for through a renegotiation on 6 September 2011.

Bangladesh started using this transit in 2011 by exporting fertilizers to Nepal. The Singabad–Rohanpur transit point is used from Raxaul Junction railway station near the border of Nepal to Khulna railway station in Bangladesh without any transshipment charges.

== Branch line ==
A branch of the Old Malda–Abdulpur line runs from Amnura to Chapainawabganj. The line has two stations. Namely: Amnura Bypass railway station and Chapainawabganj railway station.
