= Noakhali railway station =

Railway station in Noakhali District, Bangladesh

Noakhali Railway Station নোয়াখালী রেলওয়ে স্টেশন

General information
- Location: Noakhali, Noakhali District, Dhaka Division; Bangladesh
- Coordinates: 22.827376°N 91.101509°E
- Owner: Bangladesh Railway
- Line: Laksam–Noakhali line
- Platforms: 2
- Tracks: 3

Construction
- Structure type: Standard (on ground station)
- Parking: Yes
- Cycle facilities: Yes
- Accessible: Yes

Other information
- Status: Opened
- Station code: NKA
- Zone(s): East Zone
- Division(s): Chattogram

History
- Opened: 1903; 123 years ago

Services
Preceding station	Bangladesh Railway	Following station
Harinarayanpur	Line; Laksam–Noakhali line	Terminus
Route map
Location

Noakhali railway station is a railway station at Noakhali district in Chattogram division. It located on Laksam–Noakhali line. It a terminus station on that line.
