= Khulna railway station =

Railway station in Bangladesh

Khulna খুলনা
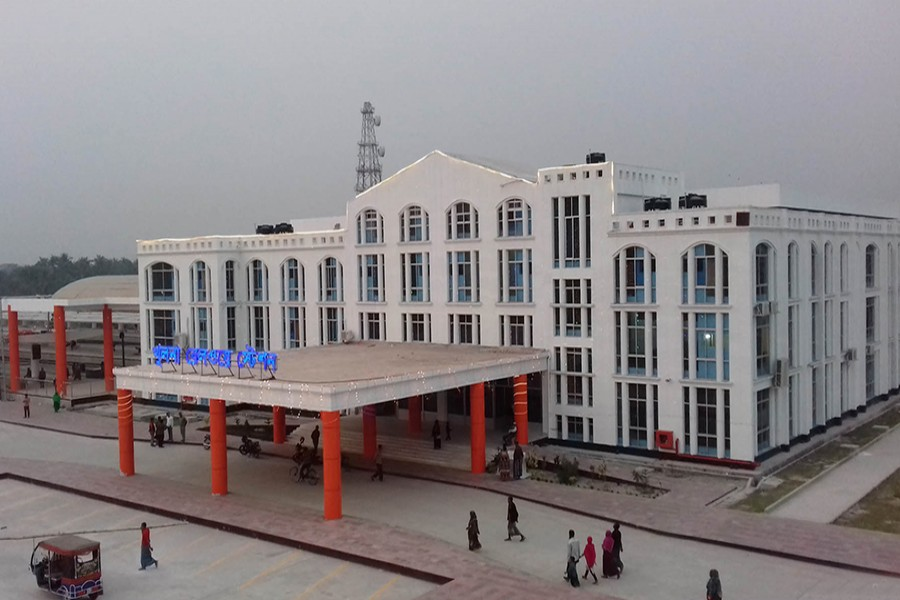
- Khulna Railway Station

General information
- Location: Power House More, Upper Jashore Road, Khulna, Khulna District, Khulna Division; Bangladesh
- Coordinates: 22.8224°N 89.5583°E
- System: Terminus
- Owner: Bangladesh Railway
- Operator: Bangladesh Railway
- Line: Darshana–Jessore–Khulna line
- Platforms: 6
- Tracks: 10
- Train operators: Bangladesh Railway

Construction
- Structure type: Standard (on ground station)
- Parking: Yes
- Cycle facilities: Yes
- Accessible: Disabled access Computerized Ticketing Counters Luggage Checking System Food Plaza Kiosks WC Taxi Stand Public Transportation
- Architectural style: Modern

Other information
- Status: Functioning
- Station code: KLN
- Classification: International/ Domestic

History
- Opened: 1884 (142 years ago)
- Rebuilt: 2018 (8 years ago)
- Former names: Eastern Bengal Railway

Services
Preceding station	Bangladesh Railway	Following station
Khulna Junction	Line; Darshana–Jessore–Khulna line	Terminus
Location

Khulna Railway Station is a railway station in Khulna, Bangladesh. The railway station is the main station of the city, and links to rest of the country via the Darshana-Jessore-Khulna Line.

== Intercity trains from Khulna ==
Train No	Name	Off Day	From	Departure	To	Arrival
825	Jahanabad Express	Monday	Khulna	06:00	Dhaka	9.45
715	Kapotaksha Express	Tuesday	Khulna	06:15	Rajshahi	12:00
727	Rupsha Express	Thursday	Khulna	07:10	Chilahati	16:40
763	Chitra Express	Monday	Khulna	09:00	Dhaka	17:55
761	Sagardari Express	Thursday	Khulna	16:00	Rajshahi	22:00
747	Simanta Express	Monday	Khulna	21:15	Chilahati	06:20
725	Sundarban Express	Tuesday	Khulna	22:15	Dhaka	07:00

== Mail trains from Khulna ==
Train No	Name	Off Day	From	Departure	To	Arrival
15	Mohananda Express	No	Khulna	11:00	Chapainawabgonj	21:40
23	Rocket Express	No	Khulna	09:30	Parbatipur	22:00
25	Nakshikantha Express	No	Khulna	23.30	Dhaka	10:10
53	Bethna Express 1	Tuesday	Khulna	06:15	Benapol	09:15
95	Bethna Express 2	Tuesday	Mohammad Nagar	13:55	Benapol	16:30

== International train from Khulna ==
The Bandhan Express connects Khulna, Bangladesh, to Kolkata railway station, India.

Route	Train Number	Day	Timing	Rake	Ref
Kolkata to Khulna	13129	Sunday & Thursday	Kolkata 07:10 am (D); Petrapole 08:55 am (A); Benapole 09:15 am (A); Jessore 11:30 am (A); Khulna 12:30 pm (A)	IR up to Petrapole from Source; BR from Benapole to Destination	
Khulna to Kolkata	13130	Sunday & Thursday	Khulna 01:30 pm (D); Jessore 02:30 pm (A); Benapole 04:00 pm (A); Petrapole 04:20 pm (A); Kolkata 06:10 pm (A)	BR from Khulna to Benapole; IR from Petrapole to Destination	

== See also ==
- Kamalapur railway station
- Rajshahi railway station
