= Rupsha Express =

Intercity train in Bangladesh

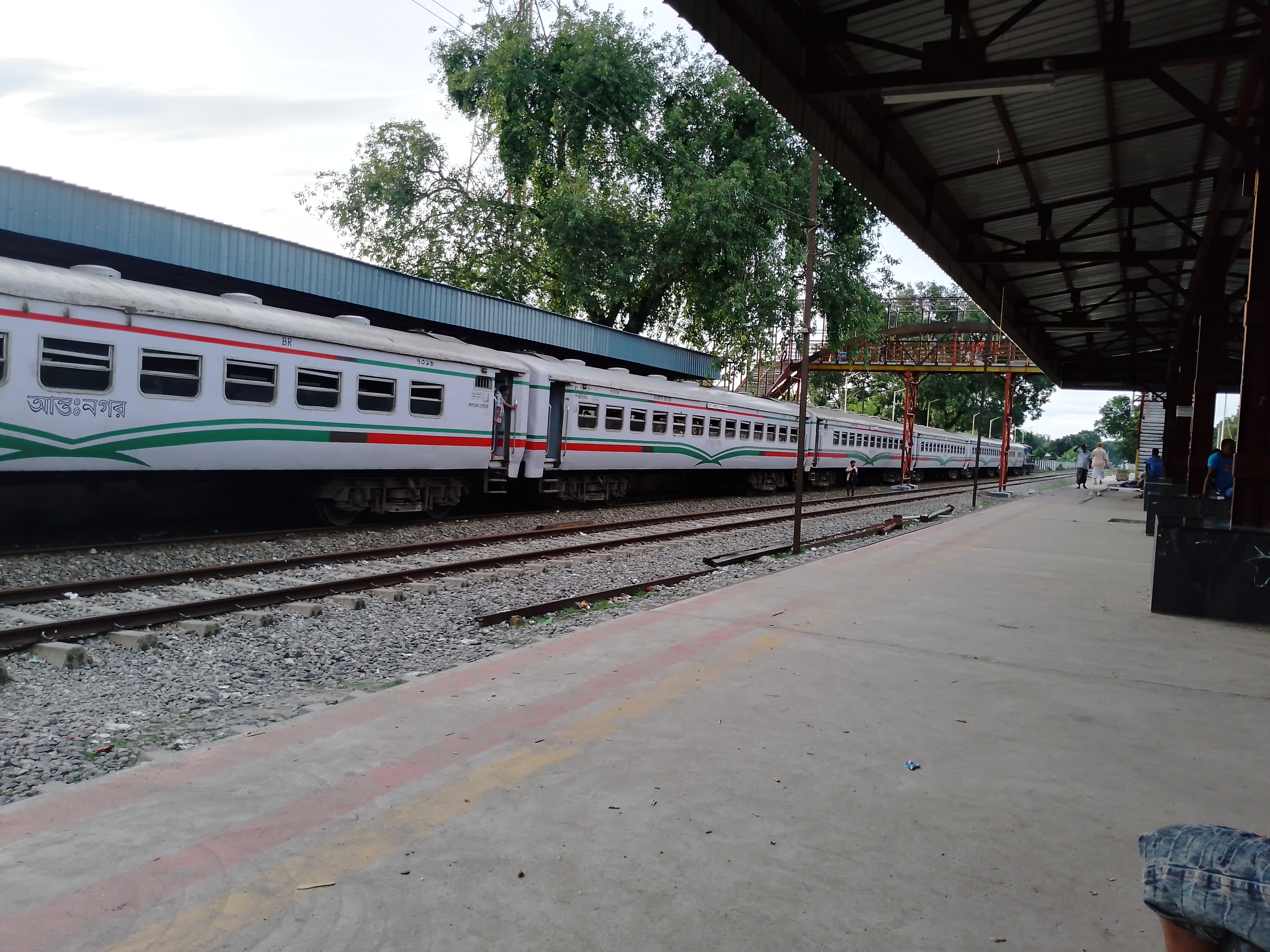
- Chilahati bound up Rupsha Express is standing at Domar railway station

Overview
- Service type: Intercity
- Status: Active
- First service: 5 May 1986
- Current operator: Bangladesh Railway

Route
- Termini: Khulna Railway Station; Chilahati Railway Station
- Stops: 20
- Distance travelled: 446 kilometres (277 miles)
- Average journey time: 10 hours
- Service frequency: 6 days per week (off Thursday)
- Train number: 727-728

On-board services
- Seating arrangements: Yes
- Sleeping arrangements: Yes
- Catering facilities: Yes
- Entertainment facilities: Yes

Technical
- Track gauge: Broadgauge

The Rupsha Express (Train No. 727/728) is a train that runs from Chilahati, in North Bengal, to Khulna, in Southwestern Bengal. It is operated by Bangladesh Railway. Another train, the Simanta Express, also travels this route.

== Routes ==
The train route from Chilahati to Khulna is the longest route in Bangladesh. It was launched on 5 May 1986.

== Timing ==
The train runs from Chilahati daily, departing at 8:00 am and reaching Khulna at 5:40 pm. It leaves Khulna at 7:25 am daily and reaches Chilahati at 5:00 pm.
