= Jahanabad Express =

Train in Bangladesh

Overview
- Service type: Intercity
- First service: 24 December 2024
- Current operator: West Zone

Route
- Termini: Khulna; Dhaka
- Stops: 8
- Distance travelled: 212 km (132 mi)
- Average journey time: 3 hours, 45 minutes
- Service frequency: 6 days each week
- Train number: 825/826
- Lines used: Dhaka -Jessore line Darshana- Jessore- Khulna line

On-board services
- Classes: AC Sleeper, AC Chair, Shovan Chair
- Seating arrangements: Yes
- Sleeping arrangements: Yes
- Catering facilities: Yes
- Entertainment facilities: Yes

Technical
- Track gauge: 1,676 mm (5 ft 6 in)

Jahanabad Express is an intercity express in Bangladesh Railway which runs between Khulna to Dhaka. This train number code is 825/826.
