= Simanta Express =

Overview
- Service type: Intercity
- Status: Active
- Current operator: Bangladesh Railway

Route
- Termini: Khulna Railway Station; Chilahati Railway Station
- Stops: 20
- Distance travelled: 446 kilometres (277 miles)
- Average journey time: 10 hours
- Service frequency: 6 days
- Train number: 747–748

On-board services
- Classes: S_chair, Snigdha, AC_S, AC_B
- Seating arrangements: Yes
- Sleeping arrangements: Yes
- Catering facilities: Yes
- Entertainment facilities: Yes
- Baggage facilities: Yes

Technical
- Track gauge: Broad gauge

Simanta Express (train No. 747/748) is an intercity train from Chilahati to Khulna. The train is conducted by Bangladesh Railway. The train serves from South-Western Bangladesh to North Bangladesh. Apart from the Simanta Express, the Rupsha Express also runs on this route.

== Routes ==
The route from Chilahati to Khulna is the longest route of Bangladesh Railway. The stations are : 1.Khulna 2.Daulatpur 3.Nowapara 4.Jessore 5.Kotchandapur 6.Darshana 7.Chuyadanga 8.Poradah 9.Bheramara 10.Ishwardi 11.Natore 12.Santahar 13.Akkelpur 14.Joypurhat 15.Birampur 16.Fulbari 17.Saidpur 18.Nilphamari 19.Domar 20Chilahati

== Timing ==
The train starts its journey from Khulna at 9:00 am and reaches the destination of Chilahati at 6:20 pm. Again it starts from Chilahati at 7:00 am and reaches at 4:30 pm to Khulna.

Simanta Express (747) — Khulna to Chilahati
| Station | Arrival | Halt | Departure |
|---|---|---|---|
| Khulna | — | 00 min | 9:15 pm |
| Daulatpur | 9:27 pm | 02 min | 9:29 pm |
| Noapara | 9:52 pm | 03 min | 9:55 pm |
| Jashore | 10:23 pm | 04 min | 10:27 pm |
| Mubarakganj | 10:54 pm | 02 min | 10:56 pm |
| Kotchandpur | 11:08 pm | 02 min | 11:10 pm |
| Darshana Halt | 11:35 pm | 03 min | 11:38 pm |
| Chuadanga | 11:57 pm | 03 min | 12:00 am |
| Alamdanga | 12:16 am | 02 min | 12:18 am |
| Poradaha | 12:34 am | 03 min | 12:37 am |
| Bheramara | 12:54 am | 03 min | 12:57 am |
| Ishwardi | 1:20 am | 10 min | 1:30 am |
| Natore | 2:07 am | 03 min | 2:10 am |
| Santahar | 3:05 am | 05 min | 3:10 am |
| Akkelpur | 3:30 am | 02 min | 3:32 am |
| Joypurhat | 3:46 am | 03 min | 3:49 am |
| Birampur | 4:17 am | 02 min | 4:19 am |
| Fulbari | 4:30 am | 02 min | 4:32 am |
| Parbatipur | 4:50 am | 10 min | 5:00 am |
| Saidpur | 5:17 am | 05 min | 5:22 am |
| Nilphamari | 5:41 am | 04 min | 5:45 am |
| Domar | 6:01 am | 22 min | 6:23 am |
| Chilahati | 6:45 am | 00 min | — |

Simanta Express (748) — Chilahati to Khulna
| Station | Arrival | Halt | Departure |
|---|---|---|---|
| Chilahati | — | 00 min | 6:30 pm |
| Domar | 6:48 pm | 03 min | 6:51 pm |
| Nilphamari | 7:07 pm | 03 min | 7:10 pm |
| Saidpur | 7:29 pm | 05 min | 7:34 pm |
| Parbatipur | 7:50 pm | 20 min | 8:10 pm |
| Fulbari | 8:28 pm | 03 min | 8:31 pm |
| Birampur | 8:42 pm | 03 min | 8:45 pm |
| Joypurhat | 9:14 pm | 03 min | 9:17 pm |
| Akkelpur | 9:31 pm | 02 min | 9:33 pm |
| Santahar | 9:55 pm | 05 min | 10:00 pm |
| Natore | 10:40 pm | 03 min | 10:43 pm |
| Ishwardi | 11:20 pm | 20 min | 11:40 pm |
| Bheramara | 12:00 am | 03 min | 12:03 am |
| Poradaha | 12:21 am | 03 min | 12:24 am |
| Alamdanga | 12:40 am | 02 min | 12:42 am |
| Chuadanga | 1:00 am | 03 min | 1:03 am |
| Darshana Halt | 1:24 am | 02 min | 1:26 am |
| Kotchandpur | 1:50 am | 02 min | 1:52 am |
| Mubarakganj | 2:04 am | 02 min | 2:06 am |
| Jashore | 2:41 am | 04 min | 2:45 am |
| Noapara | 3:13 am | 03 min | 3:16 am |
| Daulatpur | 3:41 am | 02 min | 3:43 am |
| Khulna | 4:10 am | 00 min | — |

== Halts ==
Simanta Express departs at the following stations:

- Jessore railway station
- Kot Chandpur station
- Darshan Holt railway station
- Chuadanga railway station
- Alamdanga railway station
- Poradah Junction railway station
- Bheramara railway station
- Pakshi railway station
- Ishwardi Junction railway station
- Natore railway station
- Ahsanganj railway station
- Santahar railway station
- Akkelpur railway station
- Joypurhat railway station
- Birampur railway station
- Phulbari railway station
- Parbatipur railway station
- Saidpur railway station
- Nilphamari railway station
- Domar railway station
