= Rohanpur railway station =

Railway station in Rohanpur, Bangladesh

Rohanpur রহনপুর
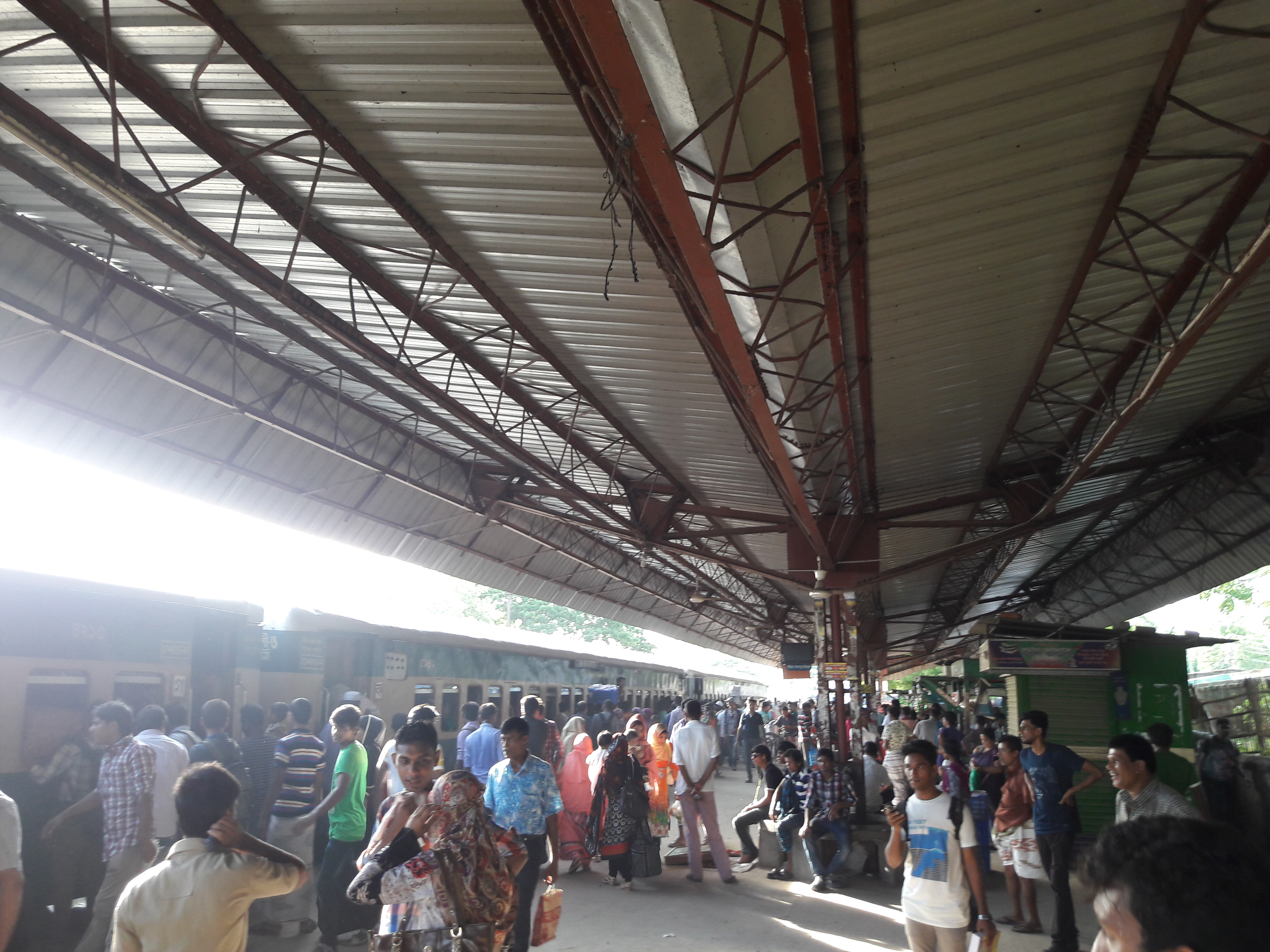
- Train waiting at Rohanpur railway station

General information
- Location: Rohanpur, Chapai Nawabganj District, Rajshahi Division; Bangladesh
- Coordinates: 24°49′00″N 88°20′00″E
- Elevation: 20 metres (66 ft)
- System: Bangladesh Railway Station
- Line: Old Malda-Abdulpur line
- Platforms: 2
- Tracks: 5

Construction
- Structure type: Standard (on ground station)
- Parking: Yes
- Cycle facilities: Yes
- Accessible: Yes

Other information
- Status: Functioning

History
- Opened: 1930; 96 years ago

Services
Preceding station	Bangladesh Railway	Following station
Terminus	Old Malda–Abdulpur	Golabari towards Abdulpur Junction
Location
- Location within Bangladesh

Rohanpur railway station (also spelled Rahanpur) is a railway station in Bangladesh, situated in Rohanpur, Chapai Nawabganj District, in Rajshahi Division. It is a functioning railway transit point on the Bangladesh-India border.

== Rohanpur-Singhabad transit facility ==
It is an active rail transit facility point. The corresponding station on the Indian side is Singhabad railway station in Malda District.

As per the Memorandum of Understanding entered into by Bangladesh and India on 15 August 1978 it was agreed to facilitate overland transit traffic between Bangladesh and Nepal. An addendum was made on 6 September 2011, to add new rail routes for facilitating overland transit traffic between Bangladesh and Nepal. The addendum read:
"1."Traffic in Transit” to/from Nepal and Bangladesh shall move through Indian territory by rail using Singhabad Railway station in India and Rohanpur Railway station in Bangladesh with their existing facilities. To ensure expeditious and smooth flow of such movement, necessary infrastructural facilities shall be provided by the two Parties within their respective territories.
"2.The existing rail route through Radhikapur Railway station in India and Birol Railway station in Bangladesh which has been suspended shall be brought into operation by converting Bangladesh portion into broad gauge. In this case, both the routes (proposed and the existing) shall be used for Nepal Transit Traffic by rail for additional operating convenience."

In the Joint Statement issued on the occasion of the visit of the Prime Minister of India to Bangladesh, on 7 September 2011, it was stated: "Bangladesh Prime Minister expressed her appreciation to the Indian Prime Minister for amendment of the MoU between the Bangladesh and Indian Railways allowing Rohanpur-Singabad as an additional route for both bulk and container cargo for Nepalese rail transit traffic. Bangladesh side also appreciated the assistance from India for the movement of fertilizers from Bangladesh to Nepal by rail route. They also agreed to re-establish rail connections between Chilahati-Haldibari and Kulaura-Mahishashan in the spirit of encouraging revival of old linkages and transport routes between the two countries".

Bangladesh started export of fertilizer to Nepal utilizing the Rahanpur-Singhabad transit point in November 2011.

The Singhabad-Rohanpur transit point allows through transport of goods from Raxaul in Nepal to Khulna in Bangladesh, without any transshipment, but is rarely used.
