= Laksam Junction railway station =

Railway station in Laksam Upazila, Bangladesh

Laksam Junction লাকসাম জংশন
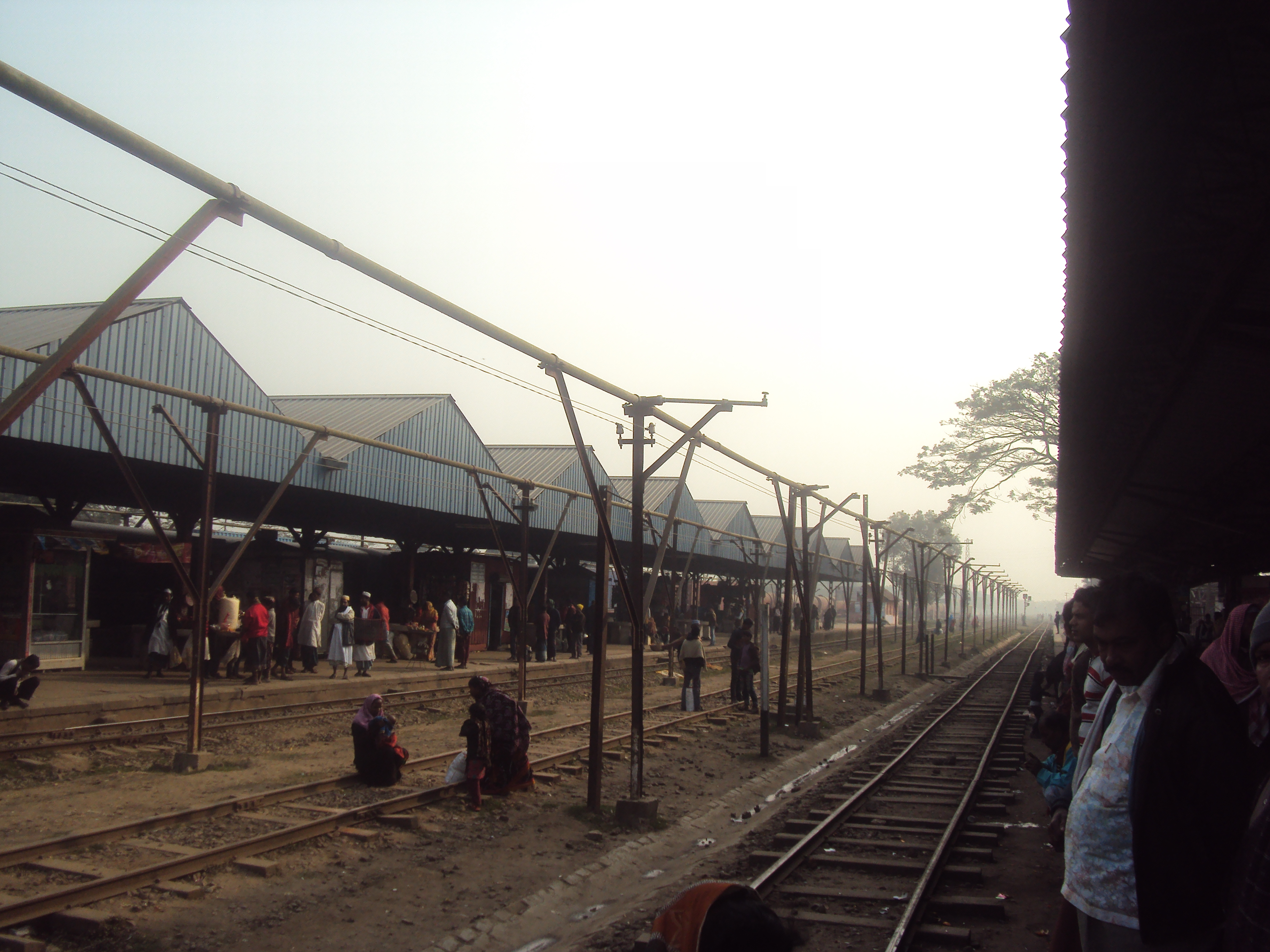
- Laksam Junction railway station

General information
- Location: Laksam Upazila, Comilla District; Bangladesh
- Coordinates: 23°14.8′N 91°7.7′E
- System: Bangladesh Railway Station
- Lines: Akhaura-Laksam-Chittagong Line, Laksam-Noakhali Line, Laksam-Chandpur Line
- Platforms: 5
- Tracks: 10
- Connections: Bus stand

Construction
- Structure type: At-grade
- Parking: Yes
- Cycle facilities: Yes
- Accessible: Yes

Other information
- Status: Operational
- Station code: LKM
- Fare zone: East Zone
Location

Laksam Junction Railway Station is one of the five biggest junctions of Bangladesh. A junction, in the context of rail transport, is a place at which two or more rail routes converge or diverge. Rail transport operations refer to stations that lie on or near a railway junction as a junction station. Laksam is a junction station.
