= Banalata Express =

Non-stop Intercity Express train service

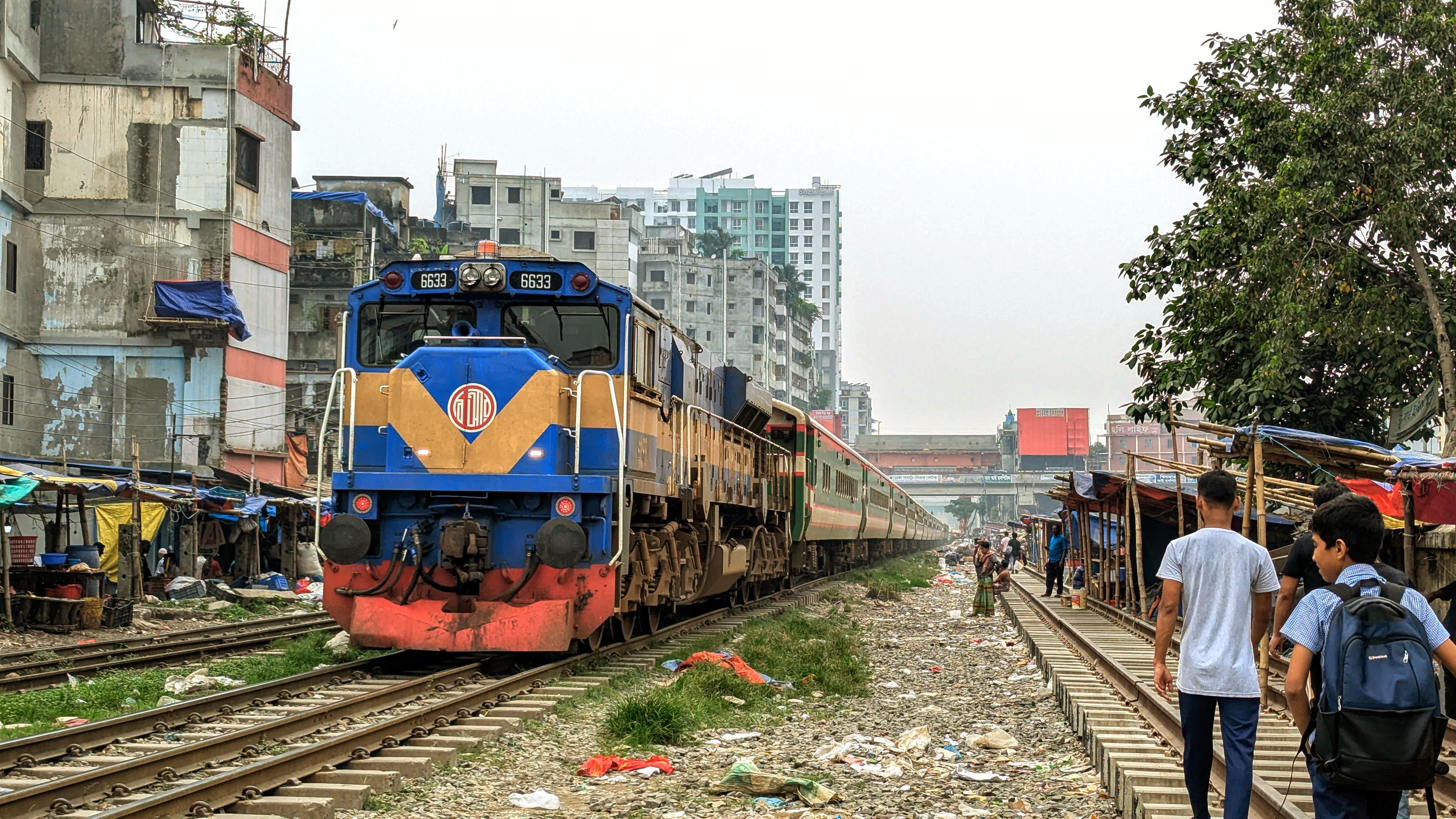
- Banalata Express

Overview
- Service type: Inter-city Train
- Status: Operating
- First service: 25 April 2019; 7 years ago
- Current operator: Bangladesh Railway

Route
- Termini: Chapai Nawabganj; Dhaka
- Stops: 4 (Including Termini)
- Distance travelled: 316 km (196 mi)
- Average journey time: 5 hours 45 minutes (From Dhaka to Rajshahi) 5 hours 35 minutes (From Rajshahi to Dhaka)
- Service frequency: Six days each week (Friday off)
- Train number: 791/792

On-board services
- Class: AC_Seat Snigdha Shovon_Chair
- Seating arrangements: Yes
- Sleeping arrangements: Day time Service.
- Auto-rack arrangements: Yes
- Catering facilities: Yes
- Observation facilities: Small Windows
- Entertainment facilities: Music
- Baggage facilities: Yes
- Other facilities: Wi-fi

Technical
- Rolling stock: Two Bangladesh Railway Class 6600 locomotives * One Baggage carriage * Two Guard Break carriage with pantry and Non-AC Chair * One genarator carrige with prayer room and Non-AC Chair * Five fully Non-AC Chair carriage, * Four AC Chair carriage * Two AC Sleeper Carriage
- Track gauge: 1,676 mm (5 ft 6 in)
- Electrification: N/A
- Operating speed: Max 110 KMPH
- Average length: 14/28
- Rake sharing: Dhumketu Express * Silkcity Express * Padma Express

The Banalata Express is a Bangladeshi Intercity train (Train no. 791/792) which runs between Chapainawabganj and Dhaka under Bangladesh Railway. It is only non-stop train to run between Dhaka and Rajshahi.

== History ==
A new passenger train with modern facilities had started serving people to connect the Bangladeshi capital Dhaka with its northern city of Rajshahi on 25 April 2019. After few days this train route extended up to Chapainawabganj. Now its running Chapainawabganj-Rajashahi to Dhaka.

The train features modern amenities such as bio-toilets, recliner seats, Wi-Fi, and LED displays. It also saves at least 1.5 hours compared to the three existing express trains between Dhaka and Rajshahi.

The train leaves from Chapainawabganj at 6:00 am and arrives Kamalapur Railway Station in Dhaka at 11:35 am. It leaves Dhaka at 1:30 pm and reaches Chapainawabganj at 7:15 pm.

=== Naming ===
Prime Minister Sheikh Hasina inaugurated the ‘Bonolota Express,’ named after the famous Bengali poem Bonolota Sen by renowned poet Jibanananda Das.

== Route ==
Banalata Express is a non-stop train from Chapainawabganj to Dhaka. It stops at two stations in route. Those are:

- Airport railway station, Dhaka
- Rajshahi Railway Station

== Train schedule ==
Train	City	Departure	Arrival
Banalata Express	Chapainawabganj	06:00 am	11:30 am
Banalata Express	Dhaka	01:30 pm	07:30 pm

== Coach composition ==
The 928-seat high-speed train with 14 coaches includes six air-conditioned cars and eight non-air conditioned cars and one luggage van are running on the route without any stoppage between Dhaka and Rajshahi. It has one engines, imported from USA in 2024, and 14 coaches, imported from China in the late 2024s. It was taken to Rajshahi from Ishwardi junction on April 23, 2019. Bangladesh Railways procured 100 high-speed and modern coaches from Chinese for new trains on different routes, including the Rajshahi–Dhaka route.

== Popular culture ==
Bonolota Express is a 2026 Bangladeshi film adopted from Humayun Ahmed's novel Kichukkhon, directed by Tanim Noor, starring Mosharraf Karim and Chanchal Chowdhury.

== See also ==
- Maitree Express
- Samjhauta Express
- Lalmoni Express
