= Chitra Express =

Bangladeshi Intercity train

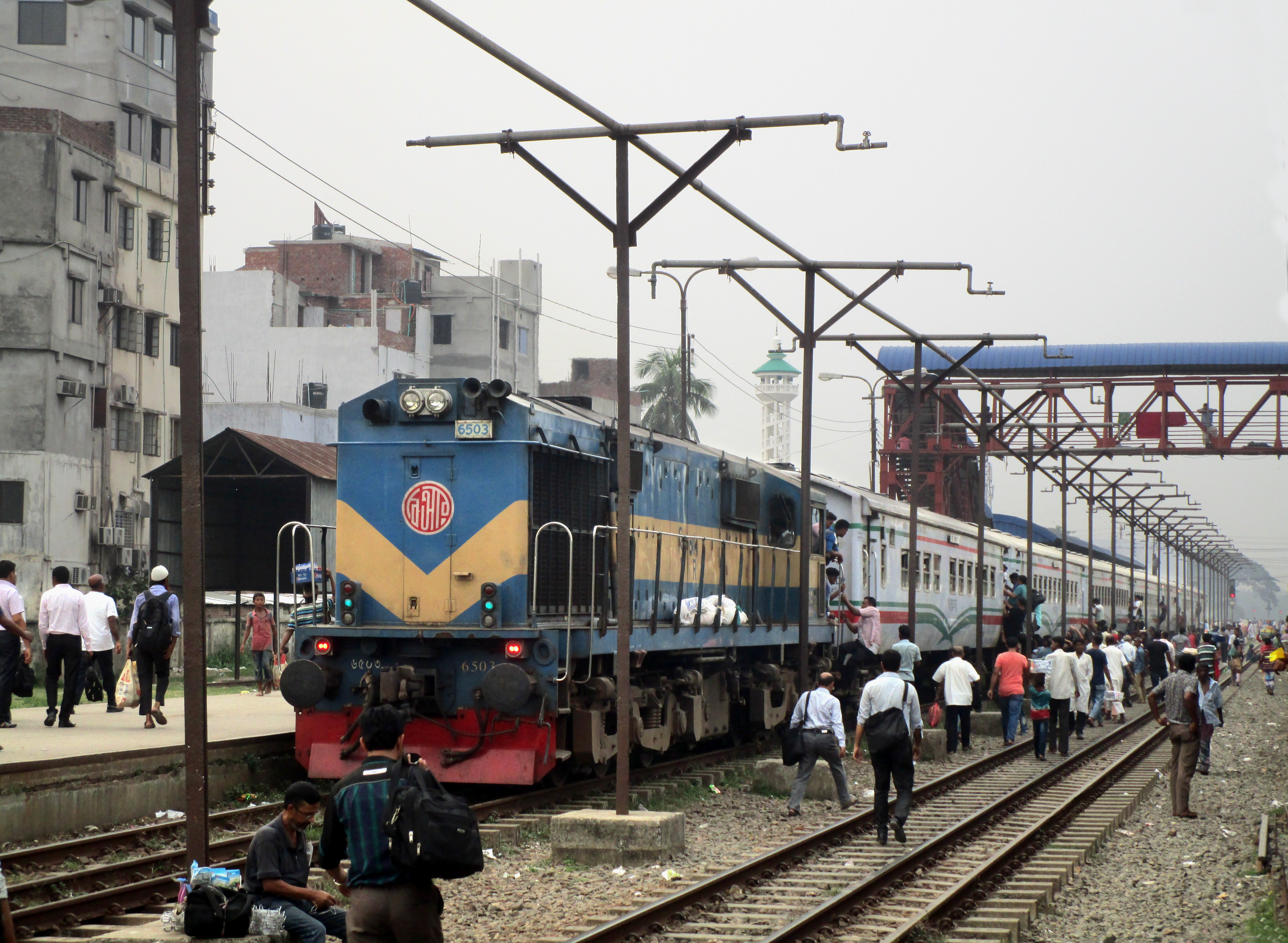
- Chitra Express waiting at Joydevpur Station

Overview
- Service type: Intercity
- First service: 7 October 2007
- Current operator: West Zone

Route
- Termini: Dhaka; Khulna
- Distance travelled: 412.4 km (256.3 mi)
- Service frequency: 6 days in a week

On-board services
- Classes: AC Sleeper, AC Chair, Non AC Chair
- Seating arrangements: Yes
- Sleeping arrangements: Yes
- Catering facilities: Yes
- Entertainment facilities: Yes

Technical
- Track gauge: 1,676 mm (5 ft 6 in)

Chitra Express is a Bangladeshi Intercity train which runs between the capital city Dhaka and the south western city Khulna through Jamuna Railway Bridge .

== Name ==
This train is named after the river Chitra of Narail. It's code no. 763/764.

== Schedule ==
Chitra Express 763 starts its journey from Khulna at 09:00 am and arrives Dhaka at 06:05 pm. Then it departs 764 Chitra Dhaka at 07:30 pm and arrives Khulna at 04:40 am. During its run, Chitra Express crosses Jamuna Bridge and Hardinge Bridge. it's the only train of Khulna division rightnow cross Jamuna route.

== Stopover ==
Sometimes, the stops of a train may be changed by Bangladesh Railway. The following list was valid till 2025.

- Dhaka
- Biman Bandar
- Joydebpur Junction
- Tangail
- Ibrahimabad
- SM M Monsur Ali
- Ullapara
- Boral Bridge
- Chatmohar
- Ishwardi Junction
- Bheramara
- Mirpur (Only 763)
- Poradaha Junction
- Alamdanga
- Chuadanga
- Darshana Halt (Only 763)
- Kotchandpur
- Mubarakganj
- Jashore Junction
- Noapara
- Khulna
