= Sundarban Express =

Intercity train of Bangladesh running between khulna and Dhaka

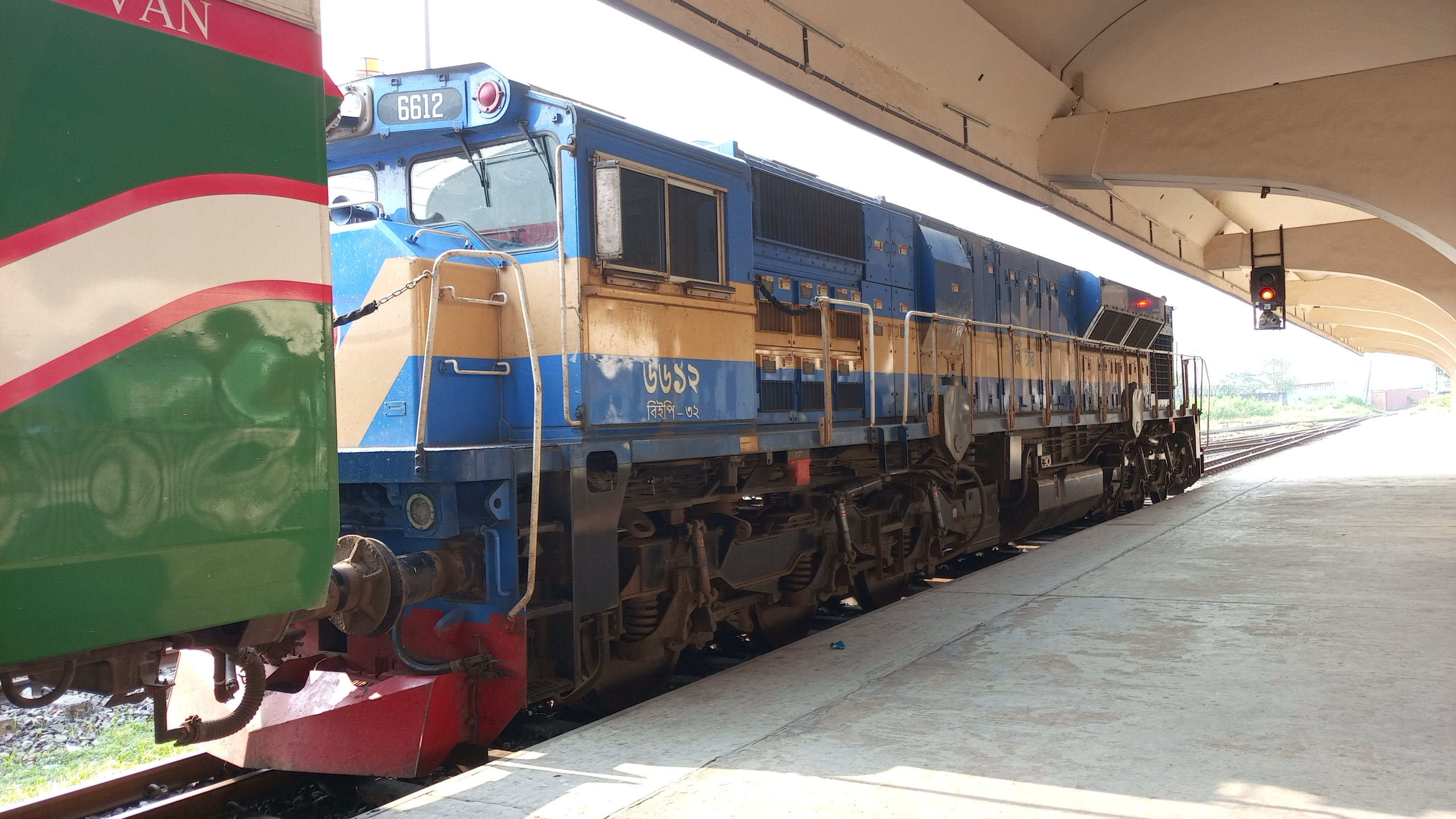
- Intercity Sundarban Express with BR 6601

Overview
- Service type: Intercity
- Status: Operating
- First service: 17 August 2003
- Current operator: West Zone

Route
- Termini: Dhaka; Khulna
- Distance travelled: 383 km (238 mi)
- Average journey time: 7 hours 30 min (approx)
- Service frequency: 6 days each week
- Train number: 725/726

On-board services
- Classes: S_Chair, Snigdha, AC_S, AC_B
- Seating arrangements: Yes
- Sleeping arrangements: Yes
- Catering facilities: Yes
- Entertainment facilities: Yes

Technical
- Track gauge: 1,676 mm (5 ft 6 in) Broad Gauge
Route map
- Dhaka-Padma Bridge-Kushtia-Poradah jun-Chuadanga-Jashore-Khulna

Sundarban Express is an intercity express train in Bangladesh Railway which runs between the capital city Dhaka and the southwestern city Khulna through Padma Bridge. It has started its operation on 17 August 2003.
