= Singhabad railway station =

Railway station in West Bengal

Singhabad

General information
- Location: Vill: Singhabad, PS: Habibpur, Distt: Malda, West Bengal, PIN 732122; India
- Coordinates: 24.9043°N 88.2898°E
- Elevation: 29 metres (95 ft)
- System: Indian Railways station
- Owner: Indian Railways
- Operator: N. F. Railway
- Line: Old Malda–Abdulpur line
- Platforms: 1 (at ground level)

Construction
- Structure type: Standard on ground
- Parking: Not required

Other information
- Station code: SQB
- Division(s): Katihar
Location
- Location within West Bengal Location within India

Singhabad railway station serves Singhabad in Habibpur community development block in Malda Sadar subdivision of Malda district in the Indian state of West Bengal. It is a railway transit point on the Bangladesh–India border.

== Train ==
There is only one train, 55709/ 55710 Singhabad–Old Malda Passenger on the route. It covers a distance of 24 km with two stops in about 45 minutes each way.
