= Abdulpur Junction railway station =

Railway station in Natore District, Bangladesh

Abdulpur Junction আব্দুলপুর জংশন
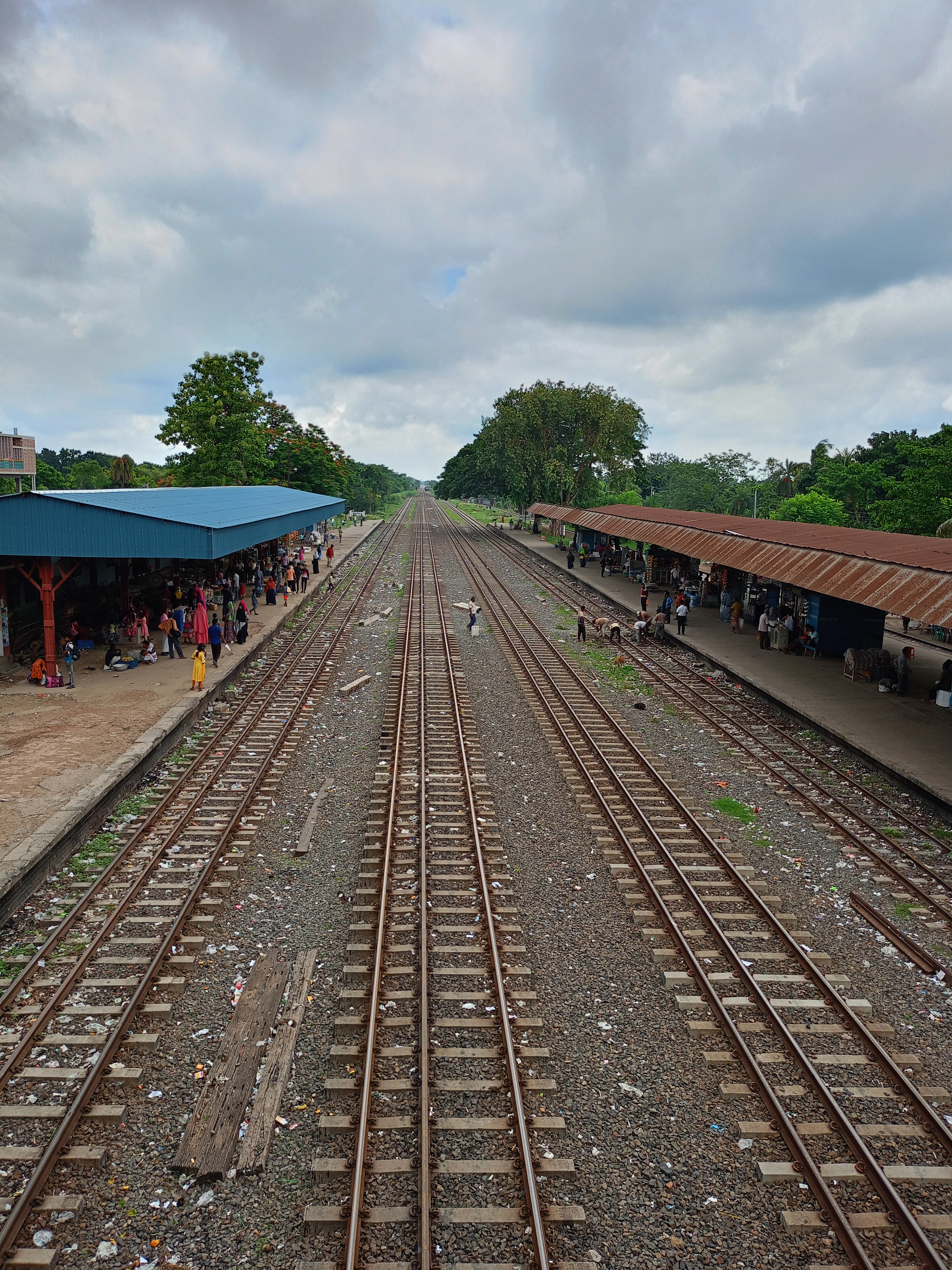

General information
- Location: Abdulpur, Dist. Natore; Bangladesh
- Coordinates: 24°15′40″N 88°58′19″E
- Owner: Bangladesh Railway
- Lines: Chilahati–Parbatipur–Santahar–Darshana line; Old Malda–Abdulpur line

History
- Opened: 1878
Location
- Location within Bangladesh

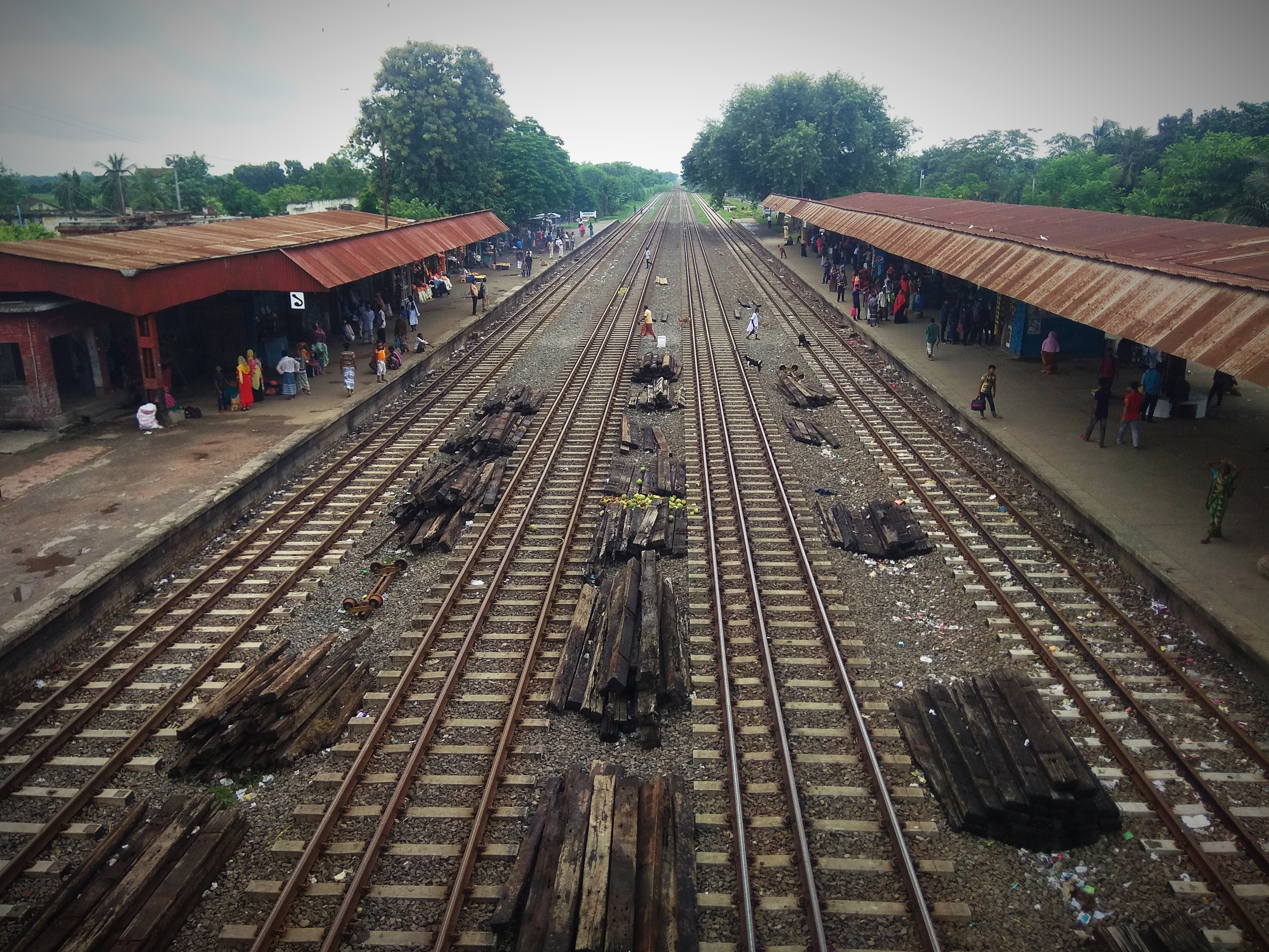
Abdulpur Railway Station

Abdulpur Junction (Bengali: আব্দুলপুর জংশন) is a railway junction in Natore District of Rajshahi Division in Bangladesh.

== History ==
From 1878, the railway route from Kolkata, then called Calcutta, to Siliguri was in two laps. The first lap was a 185 km journey along the Eastern Bengal State Railway from Calcutta Station (later renamed Sealdah) to Damookdeah Ghat on the southern bank of the Padma River, then across the river in a ferry and the second lap of the journey. A 336 km metre gauge line of the North Bengal Railway linked Saraghat on the northern bank of the Padma to Siliguri. It was during this period that Abdulpur came up as a railway station.

The Kolkata-Siliguri main line was converted to broad gauge in stages. The Shakole-Santahar section was converted in 1910–1914, when Hardinge Bridge was under construction. The Hardinge Bridge was opened in 1915. One of the biggest railway station at Natore district.
