= Locomotives of Bangladesh =

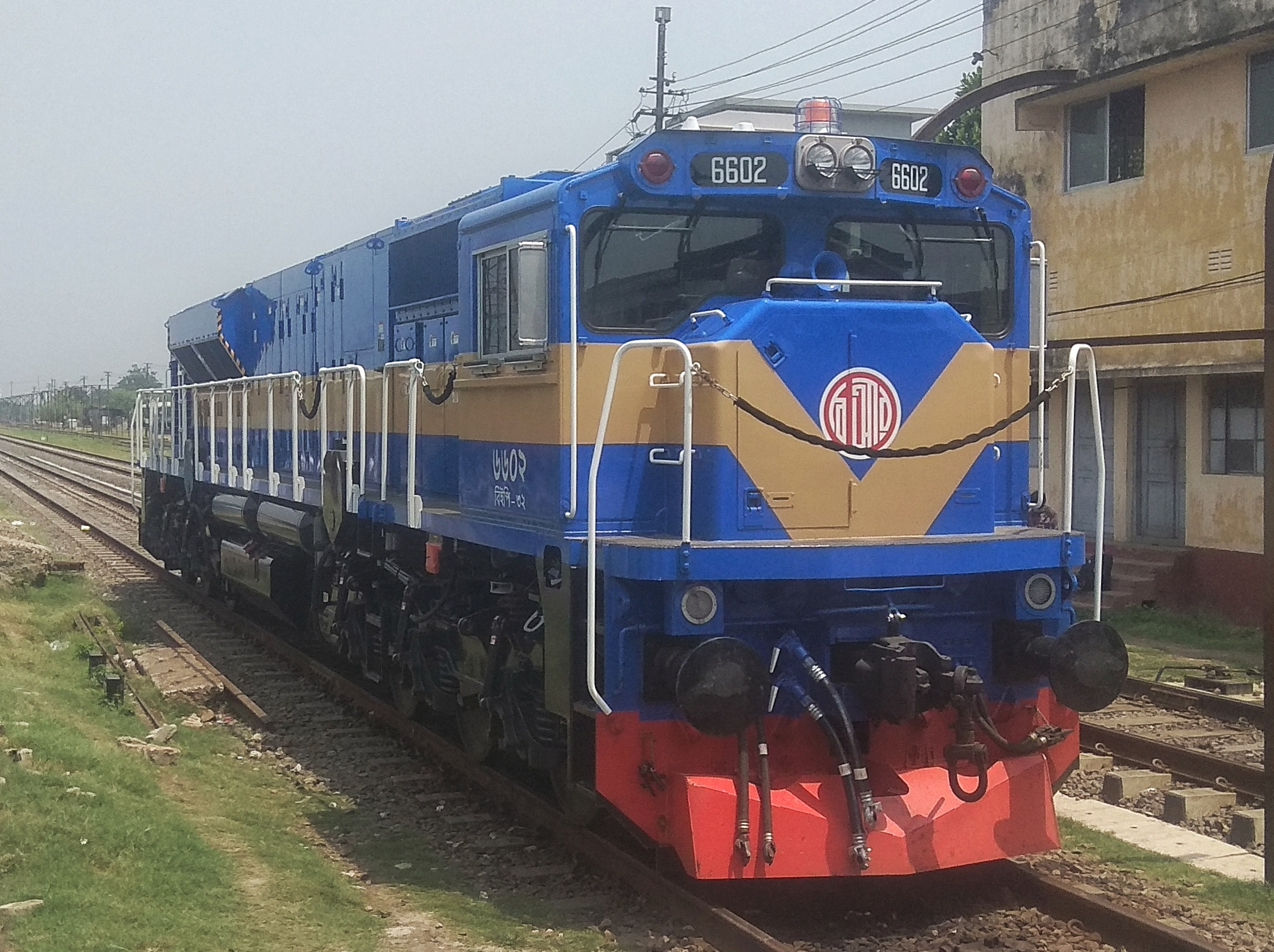
Bangladesh Railway Class 6600 is the latest class of broad-gauge locomotive of the Bangladesh Railway

In the rail transport system of Bangladesh, diesel locomotives are used by Bangladesh Railway (BR). Among diesel locos, there are diesel-electric and diesel-hydraulic locos. Besides diesel locos, steam locos were used in the past, but now they are no longer used. By gauge, there are narrow-gauge (762 mm), meter-gauge (1,000 mm) and broad-gauge (1,676 mm) locos in Bangladesh. Among them, as no narrow-gauge railroads are active, so the narrow-gauge locos are not used anymore.

In 2013, the government allocated ৳600 crore (US$49 million) to import 20 units of diesel-electric multiple unit (DEMU) trains from China's CRRC Tangshan, intending to enhance short-distance train travel. However, these controversial trains quickly became inoperative due to inadequate maintenance stemming from insufficient facilities and expertise. While BR managed to repair one using local technologies, all 20 imported sets of DEMU trains have since been abandoned in various workshops due to waning interest among railway officials.

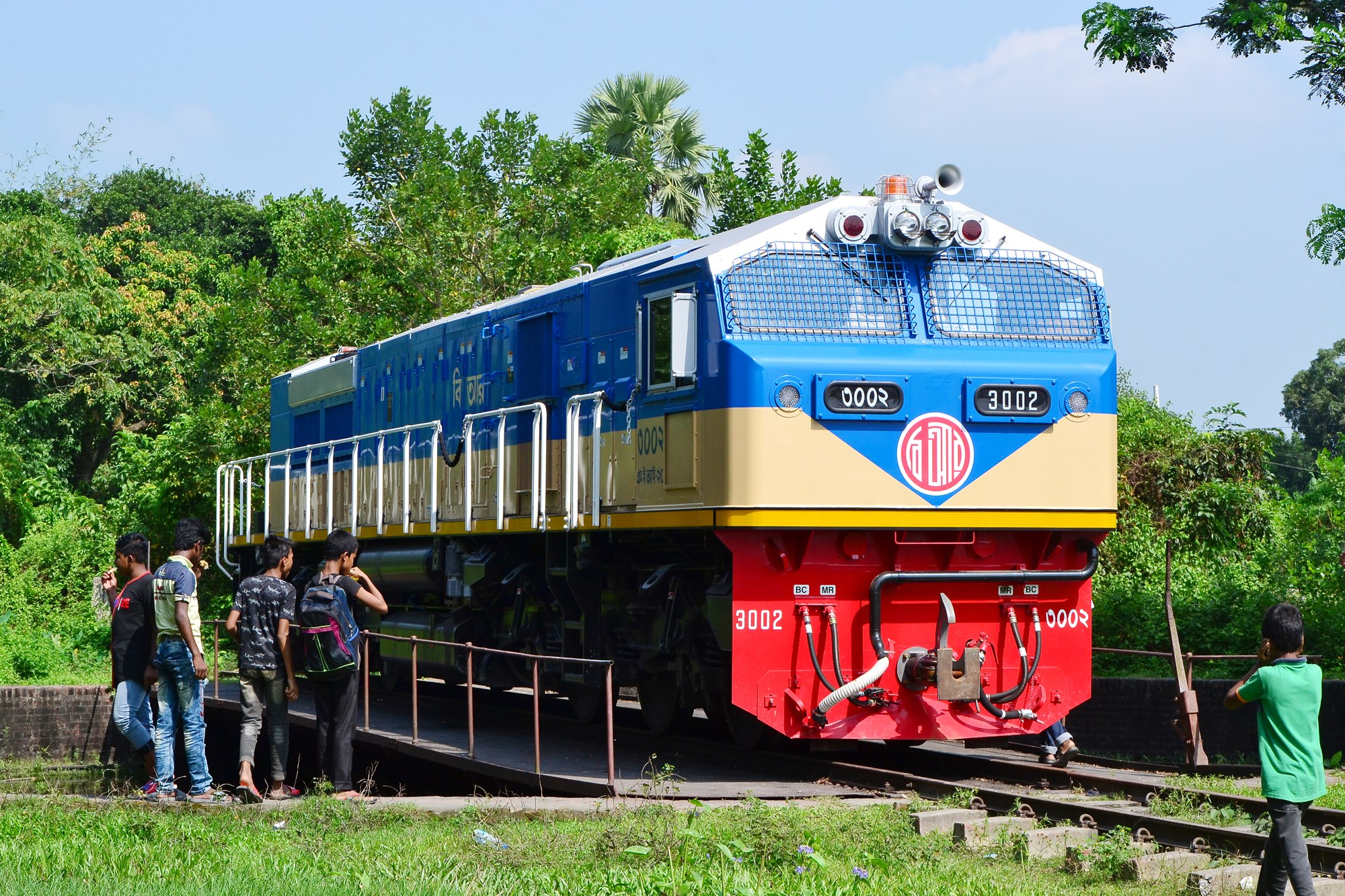
Bangladesh Railway Class 3000 is the latest class of meter-gauge locomotive of the Bangladesh Railway

As of 2020, total 476 meter-gauge and broad-gauge diesel locos (including the old 11 class 3000 locos) have been imported in Bangladesh. Most of them are diesel-electric, but 80 locos are diesel-hydraulic. Among the 476 locos, 349 are meter-gauge and 127 are broad-gauge. All diesel-hydraulic locos were produced by Ganz-MÁVAG of Hungary. Various companies produced the diesel-electric locos, notable among them are Progress Rail, Hyundai Rotem, DLW, GMD, ALCO and MLW.

== Diesel locomotives ==
=== Meter-gauge diesel locomotives ===
Class series	Class name	Builder	Model	Nos.	Number	First introduced	Power (hp)	Speed (km/h)	Base	Image
2000	MEG-11	GMD	B12	40	2000–2039	1953	1125	100	CGPY	
2100	GEU-14	GE	UM13C	10	2101–2110	1964	1,370	103	?	
2200	MEG-9	GMD	GL8	41	2201–2241	1961	875	124	CGPY; Kamalapur; Pahartali; Parbatipur	
2300	MEM-14	MLW	DL535A/RSD-30	24	2301–2324	1969	1400	96	Kamalapur; Parbatipur	
2400	MEM-14	MLW	DL535A/RSD-30	12	2401–2412	1978	1400	96	Kamalapur; Parbatipur	
2500	MEH-14	Hitachi	HFA13A	18	2501–2518	1982	1400	96	Kamalapur	
2600	MEG-15	GMD	GT18LA-2	16	2601–2616	1988	1500	107	Pahartali	
2700	MEL-15	Henschel; Adtranz	JT18U6	21	2701–2721	1994	1500	107	Pahartali	
2800	MED-14	BLW	DL535A/ RSD-30 (YDM 4BR)	10	2801–2810	1996	1400	96	?	
2900	MEI-15	Hyundai; Hyundai Rotem	GT18LA-2	39	2901–2939	1999	1500	107	Kamalapur; Pahartali; Parbatipur	
3000
3000	MEI-20	Hyundai Rotem	GT38ACL	30	3001–3030	2020	2200	140	Kamalapur; Pahartali	
3100	MEE-5	English Electric	EEU-6	26	3101–3126	1973	550	56	Pahartali	
3200	MHZ-5	Ganz-MÁVAG	DHM 10	22	3201–3222	1980	590	60	Dewanganj	
3300	MHZ-8	Ganz-MÁVAG	DHM 12	38	3301–3338	1983	800	72	Bonarpara	

=== Meter-gauge diesel multiple units ===
Class series	Class name	Builder	Model	Nos.	Number	First introduced	Power (hp)	Speed (km/h)	Base	Image
		CRRC Tangshan	DMU	20		2012	67	80		

=== Broad-gauge diesel locomotives ===
Class series	Class name	Builder	Model	Nos.	Numbering	First introduced	Power (hp)	Speed (km/h)	Base	Image
6000	BEA-20	Alco	DL543/RSD-34	18	6000–6017	1965	2000	106	Ishwardi	
6100	BEM-20	MLW	DL543/RSD-34	16	6101–6116	1969	2000	106	Ishwardi	
6200	BEH-24	Hitachi	HFA26A	12	6201–6212	1980	2450	?	Ishwardi	
6300	BEB-22	Bombardier	MX 624	12	6301–6312	1980	2200	105	Ishwardi	
6400	BED-26	BLW	DL560C (WDM 2B)	10	6401–6410	2001	2600	120	Ishwardi	
6400	BED-26	BLW	DL560C (WDM 2CA)	3	6411–6413	2004	2600	120	Ishwardi	
6500	BED-30	BLW	DL560C (WDM 3A)	26	6501–6526	2012	3100	120	Ishwardi	
6500	BED-33	BLW	DL560C (WDM 3D)	30	6527–6556	2020	3300	160	Ishwardi	
6600	BEP-32	Progress Rail	GT42AC-IAC	40	6601–6640	2021	3250	140	Ishwardi	
7000	BHZ-5	Ganz-MÁVAG	DHM 9	20	7001–7020	1980	500	60		

=== List of preserved Diesel locomotives ===
Class	Loco no.	Location	Builder	Build no.	Transmission	Engine type	Gauge
MEG-11	2000	Diesel Workshop, Pahartali, Chittagong	General Motors Diesel	A443	Diesel-electric	Two-stroke	Metre gauge 1,000 mm (3 ft 3 3/8 in)
MHZ-8	3309	Central Locomotive Workshop, Parbatipur, Dinajpur	Ganz Mavag, Budapest, Hungary		Diesel-hydraulic		Metre gauge 1,000 mm (3 ft 3 3/8 in)
MHZ-8	3332	Saidpur Works, Nilphamari	Ganz Mavag, Budapest, Hungary		Diesel-hydraulic		Metre gauge 1,000 mm (3 ft 3 3/8 in)

== Steam locomotives ==
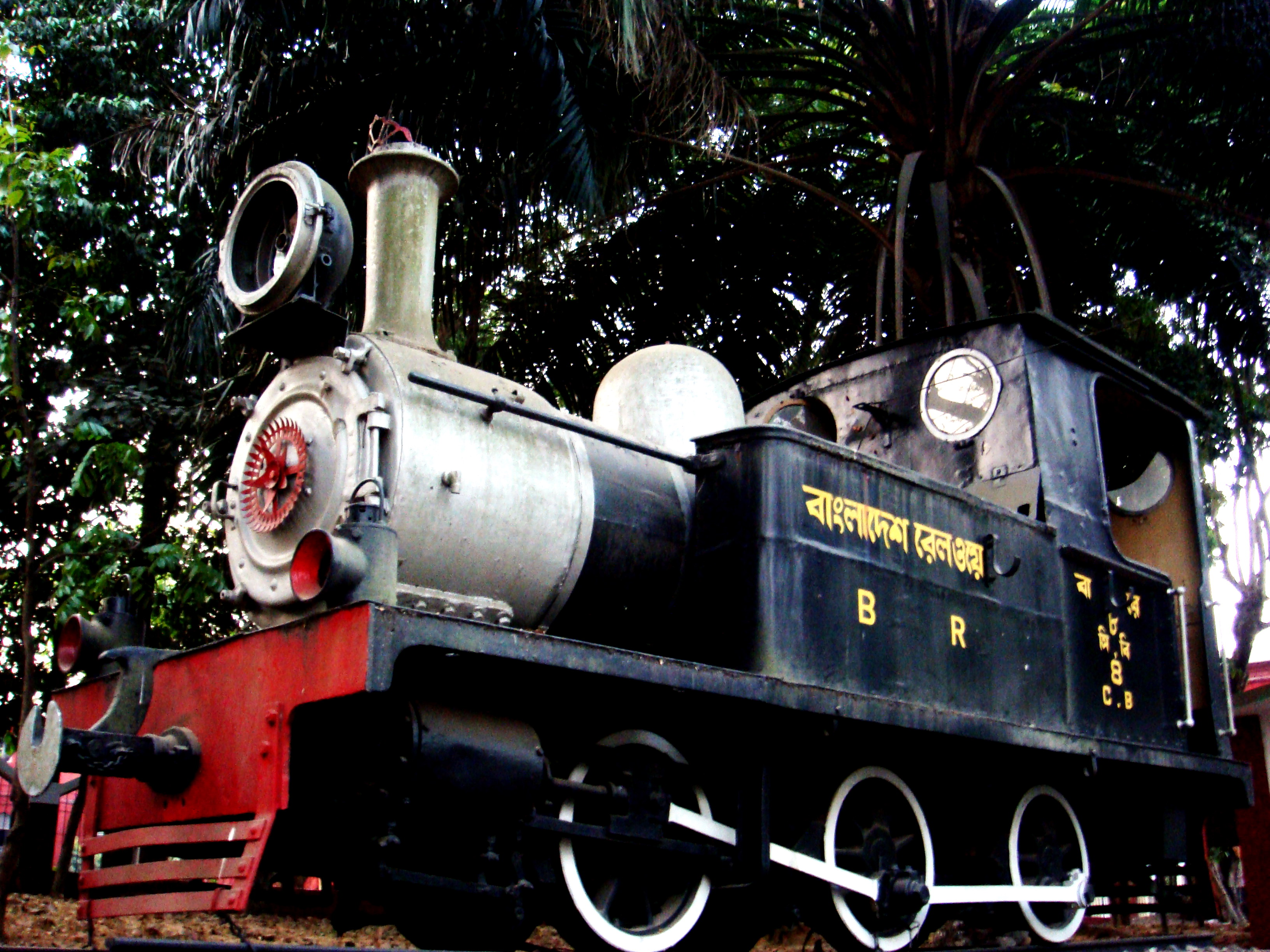
First ever steam locomotive of Bangladesh

A small number of steam locomotives are preserved in Bangladesh.

Location	Class	Builder	Wheel arrangement	Gauge	Image
Dhaka Railway HQ	YD 718	Nippon Sharyo, Japan	2-8-2	Metre gauge 1,000 mm (3 ft 3 3/8 in)	
Saidpur Works	CS 15	W. G. Bagnall, England	2-4-0T	Narrow Gauge 2 ft 6 in (762 mm)	
Saidpur Works	SGC-2 240	Vulcan Foundry, England	0-6-0	Broad Gauge 5 ft 6 in (1,676 mm)	
Paksay Railway HQ	CB 8	Vulcan Foundry, England	2-4-0T	Narrow Gauge 2 ft 6 in (762 mm)	
Pahartoli Works	CB 7	Vulcan Foundry, England	2-4-0T	Narrow Gauge 2 ft 6 in (762 mm)	
Rajshahi Railway HQ	HPS 30	Vulcan Foundry, England	4-6-0	Broad Gauge 5 ft 6 in (1,676 mm)	
National Scout Training Center, Mouchak, Gazipur	RC 233	Kawasaki, Japan	4-6-0	Metre gauge 1,000 mm (3 ft 3 3/8 in)	

The 2 ft 6 in (762 mm) gauge locomotives are from the Rupsa-Bagerhat railway which was the only 2 ft 6 in gauge line in East Pakistan when colonial India was partitioned in 1947. It was re-gauged to 5 ft 6 in (1,676 mm) gauge in 1970.
