= 6400 =

6400 or variation, may refer to:

== In general ==
- A.D. 6400, a year in the 7th millennium CE
- 6400 BCE, a year in the 7th millennium BC
- 6400, a number in the 6000 (number) range

== Electronics and computing ==
- Texas Instruments 6400 series ICs, a variant of the 7400-series integrated circuits
- IBM 6400 Accounting Machine
- IBM 6400, a family of printers
- CDC 6400. a mainframe computer
- Power Macintosh 6400 personal computer

== Rail ==
- Bangladesh Railway Class 6400, a diesel locomotive train class
- GWR 6400 Class, a pannier tank steam locomotive train class
- NS Class 6400, a class of diesel-electric locomotive train

== Other uses ==
- 6400 Georgealexander, an asteroid in the Asteroid Belt, the 6400th asteroid registered; see List_of_minor_planets:_6001–7000
- 6400 (District of Përmet), one of the postal codes in Albania
