= Bangladesh Railway Class 6400 =

BED-26
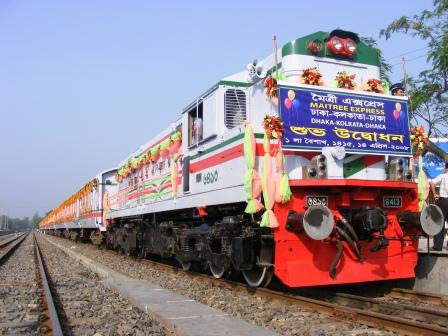
- Locomotive 6413 with Maitree Express
Type and origin
- Power type: Diesel-electric
- Builder: Banaras Locomotive Works, India
- Model: WDM-2B, WDM-2CA
- Build date: 6401 - 6410 (WDM-2B): 2001; 6411 - 6413 (WDM-2CA): 2004
- Total produced: 13
Specifications
- Configuration
  - UIC: Co-Co
- Gauge: 1,676 mm
- Fuel type: Diesel
- Prime mover: ALCo 16-251C
- Engine type: Four-stroke diesel engine
Performance figures
- Maximum speed: 120 km/h
- Power output: 2,600 hp
Career
- Operators: Bangladesh Railway
- Class: BED-26
- Numbers: 6401 - 6413
- Locale: Bangladesh Railway West Zone
- Disposition: Active

Bangladesh Railway Locomotive Class 6400 (BED-26) is a class of broad-gauge diesel-electric locomotives owned by Bangladesh Railway. Total 13 locomotives have been manufactured by Banaras Locomotive Works (BLW), India, 10 in 2001 as WDM-2B and 3 in 2004 as WDM-2CA. The class name stands for broad gauge (B), Diesel-electric (E), manufactured by DLW (D), engine with 26 * 100 hp (26) and numbered as 6401 - 6413. Currently all are active in service.

== Liveries ==
Initially BED-26 locomotives had the deep blue-yellow and white-red liveries. But currently they all have the traditional green-yellow liveries.

== Usage ==
Class 6400 locomotives when introduced, were used prominently on high-end passenger trains like Padma Express, Silk City Express and Maitree Express. Now they are mostly used on freight trains as Class 6500 and Class 6600 locomotives are used to haul most high-end passenger trains. Intercity trains like Kapotaksha Express, Titumir Express, Sagordari Express are also hauled by these locomotives.

== See also ==
- Indian locomotive class WDM-2
- Indian locomotive class WDM-3A
