= 2800 class =

2800 class or Class 2800 may refer to:

- Bangladesh Railway Class 2800, diesel-electric locomotives
- GWR 2800 Class, 2-8-0 steam locomotives
- IÉ 2800 Class, diesel multiple units
- Queensland Railways 2800 class, diesel-electric locomotives
