= Indian locomotive class WDM-3D =

Indian Railway class diesel locomotive

WDM-3D
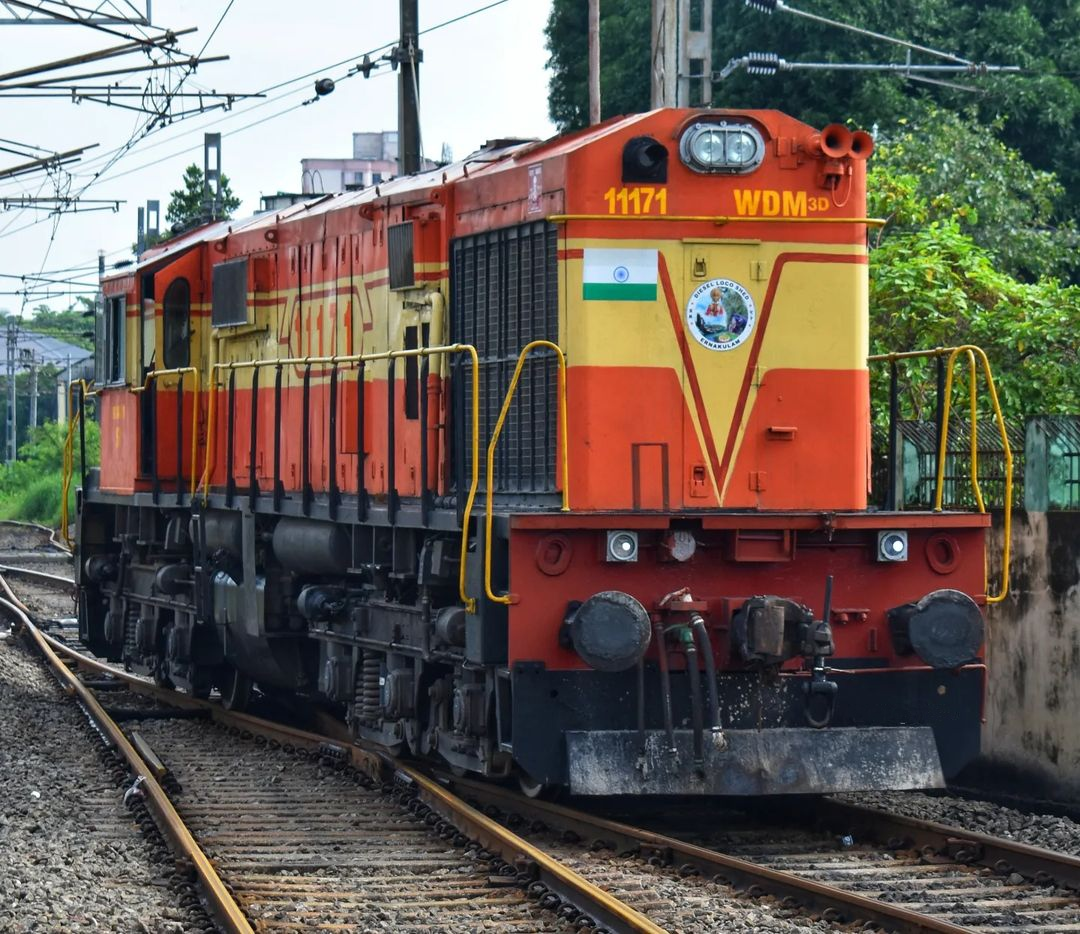
- Ernakulam based WDM-3D roaming light near Ernakulam Junction.
Type and origin
- Power type: Diesel–electric
- Designer: BLW, RDSO
- Builder: BLW, PLW, Parel Locomotive Workshop
- Model: DL560C
- Build date: 2003–2016
- Total produced: 490+20 Rebuilt from WDM-3B
Specifications
- Configuration
  - UIC: Co′Co′
  - Commonwealth: Co-Co
- Gauge: 1,676 mm (5 ft 6 in)
- Bogies: HAHS Bogie (with OR without equaliser)
- Wheel diameter: 1,092 mm (3 ft 7 in)
- Wheelbase: 1,900 mm (6 ft 3 in)
- Pivot centres: 11,450 mm (37 ft 7 in)
- Length
  - Over couplers: 18,632 mm (61 ft 2 in)
  - Over beams: 17,350 mm (56 ft 11 in)
- Width: 2,950 mm (9 ft 8 in)
- Height: 4,340 mm (14 ft 3 in)
- Axle load: 19.5 t (19,500 kg)
- Loco weight: 117 t (117,000 kg)
- Fuel type: Diesel
- Fuel capacity: 6,000 L (1,300 imp gal; 1,600 US gal)
- Lubricant cap.: 1,270 L (280 imp gal; 340 US gal)
- Coolant cap.: 1,210 L (270 imp gal; 320 US gal)
- Sandbox cap.: 160 L (35 imp gal; 42 US gal)
- Prime mover: ALCO 251-B (BLW Uprated)
- RPM range: 350/400–1050 rpm
- Engine type: V16 Four-stroke diesel engine
- Aspiration: GE 7S1716 Turbo-Supercharged
- Displacement: 175.14 L (38.53 imp gal; 46.27 US gal)
- Alternator: BHEL TA10102EV
- Generator: BHEL AG3101AY-1
- Traction motors: BHEL TM5002BY
  - Rating 1 hour: 950 amps
  - Continuous: 925 amps
- Cylinders: 16
- Cylinder size: 228.6 mm × 266.7 mm (9.00 in × 10.50 in) bore x stroke
- Transmission: Diesel–electric Microprocessor based AC-DC transmission
- Gear ratio: 18:65
- MU working: 2
- Loco brake: Air Brake, Dynamic Brake, Hand Brake
- Train brakes: Air Brake
- Compressor: 2,266 L/min (@ 400 rpm), 5,665 L/min (@ 1000 rpm)
Performance figures
- Maximum speed: 120 km/h (75 mph); 145 km/h (90 mph) (Tested Speed)
- Power output: Max:3,300 hp (2,500 kW); Site rated:3,152 hp (2,350 kW)
- Tractive effort: 38.61 tf (378.6 kN) @ 33% adhesion
- Factor of adh.: 3.23
- Dynamic brake peak effort: 17.94 tf (175.9 kN)
Career
- Operators: Indian Railways; Bangladesh Railway; Sri Lanka Railways
- Numbers: 11101 - 11590
- Disposition: active

The Indian locomotive class WDM-3D is a class of diesel–electric locomotive that was developed in 2003 by Banaras Locomotive Works (BLW), Varanasi for the Indian Railways. The model name stands for broad gauge (W), Diesel (D), Mixed traffic (M) engine with 3300 horsepower (3D). The engine is classified WDM-3D though it outputs only 3300 hp and not 3400 hp as the name should suggest. They entered service in 2003. A total of 490+ WDM-3D were built at Banaras Locomotive Works (BLW), Varanasi between 2003 and 2016.

The WDM-3D is one of the most successful locomotives of Indian Railways serving both passenger and freight trains. A few WDM-3D units were exported or gifted to neighboring countries like Sri Lanka and Bangladesh. A significant number of these locomotives are still in use, both on mainline and departmental duties. As of September 2026, 369 locomotives retain "operational status" on the mainline as WDM-3D, with further examples having been converted from WDM-3B.

== History ==
WDM 3D locomotive at Nashik Road Railway station with a goods train seen in November 2026

WDM-3D was developed in by Banaras Locomotive Works and Research Design and Standards Organisation in 2003. The locomotive is equipped with BHEL TA10102EV traction alternator with BHEL mounted rectifier AR 3700A. The first one was built in July 2003, numbered #11101. The first few units (five) were all homed at krishnarajapuram but were later transferred to Erode. Serial production started in late 2005 with locos being allotted to almost all major BG diesel sheds. Earlier WDM-3Ds had issues with their electronics which probably led to the development of the WDM-3B in 2005, the same WDM-3D without microprocessor control. The class is considered successful with over 590 units being built. The production has now ceased as DLW has moved to manufacturing more Advanced locos. One unit #11121 has a modified short hood, similar to WDP-4 and is homed at Erode. This locomotive has been condemned in November 2024 and scrapped in January 2025.

== Specification ==
It is the higher-powered version of the Indian locomotive class WDM-3A. These locos have a 3300 hp power pack, with maximum available traction power of 2925 hp. The engine is an enhanced version of the 16-cylinder Alco 251C model with a max. speed of 160 km/h. The bogies are Improved Fabricated (welded) Alco High-Adhesion Co-Co bogies with stem type vertical and lateral dampers in place of 'eye' type which helps reduce wheel slip and maintenance.

The loco features left hand drive, WDG-3A style High Adhesion bogies, air cylinder under foot-board, WDP-4 style fuel tanks, engine doors like WDP-4, marker lights outside cabin doors, electronic horn, High capacity buffers. Components and auxiliaries have been improved with the aim of making the duty schedule longer between maintenance visits to the shed.

== Sub Classes ==
=== WDM-3B ===
The WDM3B diesel locomotive class was developed in 2005 after the WDM3C and WDM3D. It actually is a variant of the WDM3D, though it shares its power rating with the WDM3A. Only 23 numbers were built (road numbers #14144 to #14167), making them very rare. It has the same engine as the WDM3D, despite having a power deficit of 200 hp. It also looks the same, shares the same body shell, control cabin, undercarriage and the high-adhesion bolsterless bogies of the WDM3D. The difference is that unlike the WDM3D, the WDM3B is not microprocessor controlled but uses something called "E-Type Excitation" for locomotive control. The WDM3B seems to be the result of the Railways trying to cut the WDM3D down to size by eliminating its troublesome features like microprocessor control. But now 3Bs are being converted into 3Ds. WDM3Bs are housed at UP sheds like Lucknow, Gonda, Jhansi, Samastipur, Patratu etc. and many are (were) famously named "Gajraj". The WDM3B does not adhere to the hp-based naming convention as WDM3A already represented 3100 hp. IR just assigned the vacant WDM3B class to this type.

=== WDM-3E ===
This was an experimental class developed out of the WDM3D by IR on the ever-lookout for more power, all equipped with High Adhesion bogies and roof-mounted DBRs. However, they never entered serial production. Some suggest that the WDM3E is actually called "WDM3D without Equalizer" or WDM3Ds with 3500 hp power. The known road numbers in service for this class are #11306 to #11311 and #11263. All are marked WDM3D and all are used to haul only freights with speed restricted to 85 km/h. They look exactly like the WDM3D and share all its features.

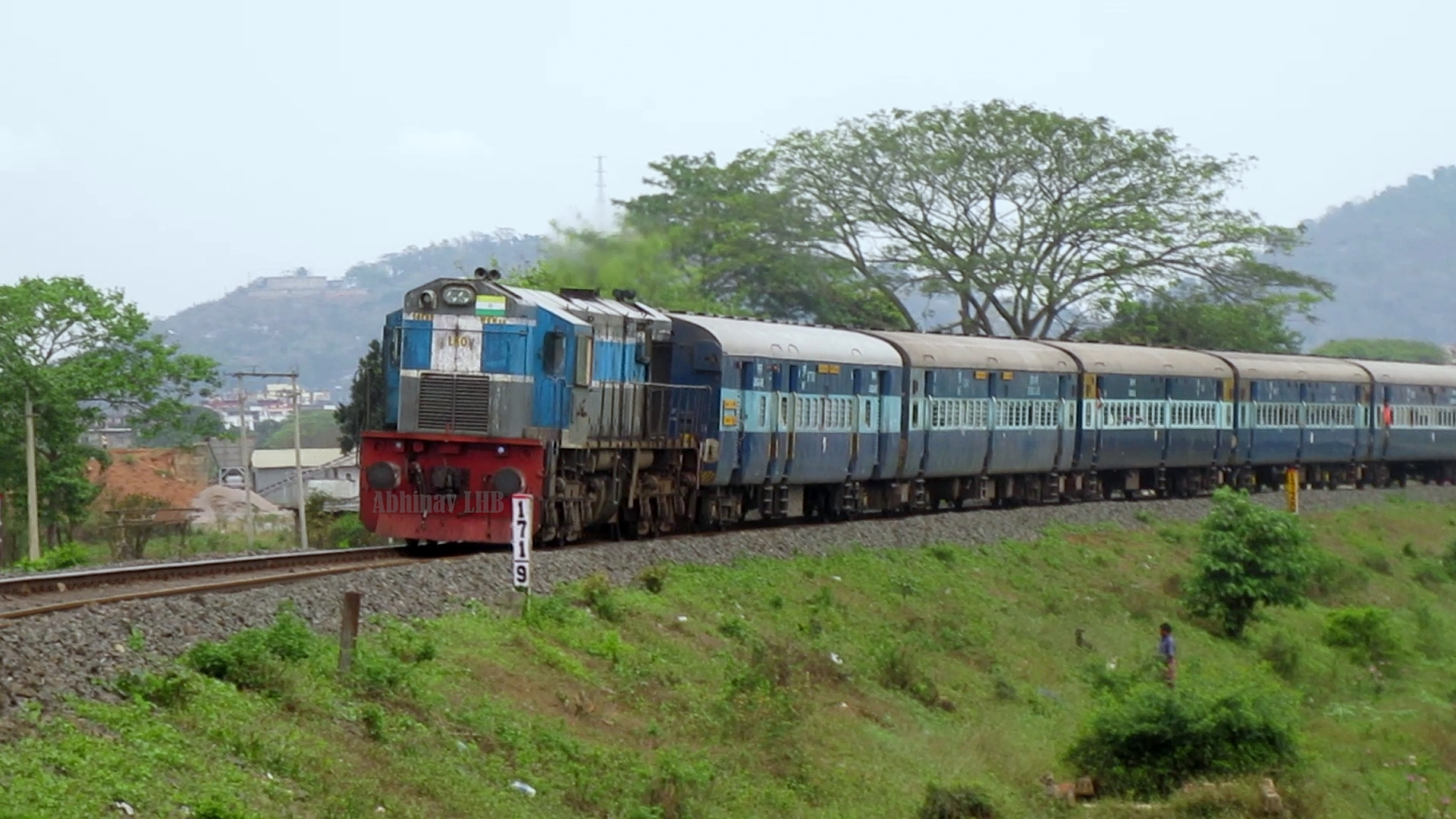
A WDM-3B with KYQ - GIMB Express

=== WDM-3F ===
The very extremely rare WDM3F was the result of the last and final experiment in IR's drive for more powerful ALCOs. This one is rated 3600 hp and only four were produced (#11287, #11321, #11325, #11342). #11287 has a unique aerodynamic design where the ends taper upwards (picture above). All WDM3Fs are based at Gooty (GY) and share all the features of the WDM3D including roof mounted DBRs except the #11287. Though high powered, this class apparently didn't work out well because after the WDM3F, IR realized that it is futile to try and crank more power of the ALCOs as they were too old and outdated and shifted attention to the EMD. This also marked the beginning of the end of the ALCO domination on Indian Railways.

== Export versions ==
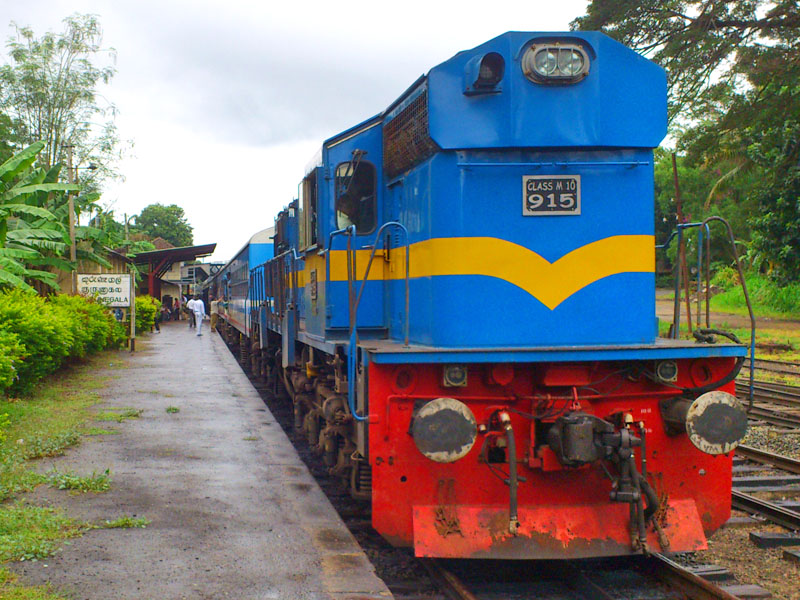
Class M10

=== Sri Lanka ===
Nine WDM-3D locomotives were purchased by Sri Lanka Railways in 2012. They were the longest and most powerful locomotives owned by Sri Lanka Railways at that time. They were allocated the M10 class. However some specifications are somewhat different for SLR. This class was used for the construction work of Talaimannar and Kankasanthurei railway lines. After extending the northern line to Jaffna and beyond, M10s were used for passenger services including Yal Devi on the northern line. As of August 2020, all units of this class are still in service.

=== Bangladesh ===
On 27 July 2020, due to over-aging of existing Bangladesh Railways locomotives, IR gave 10 WDM-3D units for free under its "grant assistance" plan. The Railways has modified the locos to suit the maximum height restrictions in BR and the donated locomotives (6-8 year old) have 28 years of serviceable life left. India formally handed over the locomotives in a virtual ceremony on 27 July. The vehicles cost an estimated ₹600m ($US 8m) to manufacture. On 24 May 2023, 20 more WDM-3D locomotives were gifted under the same "grant assistance" plan.

== Locomotive sheds ==
Zone	Name	Shed Code	Quantity
Central Railway	Pune	PADX	14
Central Railway	Kalyan	KYDX	17
Central Railway	Kurla	CLAD	21
Eastern Railway	Howrah	HWHD	16
East Central Railway	Samastipur	SPJD	37
Northern Railway	Lucknow	AMVD	69
North Central Railway	Jhansi	JHSD	27
North Eastern Railway	Izzatnagar	IZND	15
Northeast Frontier Railway	Malda Town	MLDD	11
Northeast Frontier Railway	New Guwahati	NGCD	15
North Western Railway	Abu Road	ABRD	13
Southern Railway	Golden Rock	GOCD	14
Southern Railway	Ernakulam	ERSX	3
South Central Railway	Moula Ali	MLYD	9
South Coast Railway	Gooty	GYD	18
South Eastern Railway	Bondamunda	BNDX	9
Western Railway	Ratlam	RTMD	11
Western Railway	Sabarmati	SBTD	20
West Central Railway	Itarsi	ETD	30
Total Locomotives Active as of November 2026			369

== See also ==
- Sri Lanka Railways M10
- Indian locomotive class WDM-2
- List of diesel locomotives of India
- Indian Railways
