= IBM 6400 =

The IBM 6400 family of line matrix printers were modern highspeed business computer printers introduced by IBM in 1995. These printers were designed for use on a variety IBM systems including mainframes, servers, and PCs.

== Configuration ==
The 6400 was available in a choice of three configurations:

- Open pedestal (to minimize floor size requirements)
- Enclosed cabinet (for quiet operation).
- Enclosed cabinet with power paper stacker

It offered a variety of interfaces including:

- RS-232 Serial
- RS-422 Serial
- PC Parallel
- Dataproducts Parallel
- Ethernet (10Base-T or 10Base-2)
- IEEE 1284

It also offered two Coax/Twinax features:

- IBM Coax/Twinax
- Coax/Twinax Multi-Platform Interface

When configured with the appropriate graphics option, it could print mailing bar codes "certified by the U.S. Postal Service. A wide variety of configurations were sold by IBM.

== Models ==
A variety of models were offered:

The 6400 Series Printer Family
Model Number	Print Speed	Enclosure	Hammer Bank	Data Controller Clock
6400-004	475 lpm	Cabinet	28 Hammers	25 MHz
6400-04P	475 lpm	Pedestal	28 Hammers	25 MHz
6400-005	500 lpm	Cabinet	28 Hammers	25 MHz
6400-05P	500 lpm	Pedestal	28 Hammers	25 MHz
6400-050	500 lpm	Cabinet	28 Hammers	40 MHz
6400-P50	500 lpm	Pedestal	28 Hammers	40 MHz
6400-008	800 lpm	Cabinet	49 Hammers	25 MHz
6400-08P	800 lpm	Pedestal	49 Hammers	25 MHz
6400-009	900 lpm	Cabinet	49 Hammers	25 MHz
6400-09P	900 lpm	Pedestal	49 Hammers	25 MHz
6400-010	1000 lpm	Cabinet	60 Hammers	40 MHz
6400-P10	1000 lpm	Pedestal	60 Hammers	40 MHz
6400-012	1200 lpm	Cabinet	91 Hammers	25 MHz
6400-014	1400 lpm	Cabinet	91 Hammers	40 MHz
6400-015	1500 lpm	Cabinet	102 Hammers	40 MHz
6400-C05	585 lpm	Cabinet	91 Hammers	40 MHz
6400-C5P	585 lpm	Pedestal	91 Hammers	40 MHz

On 22 October 2002 IBM announced models i5P, i05, i1P, i10, i15 and i20 which offered amongst other things, wireless ethernet attachment.

== Rebadged ==
These printers were manufactured by Printronix Corp and rebranded for IBM. Many internal parts had the Printronix Logo and/or artwork.

The IBM Printing Systems Division was sold to Ricoh in 2007.
