= Bangladesh Railway Class 6500 =

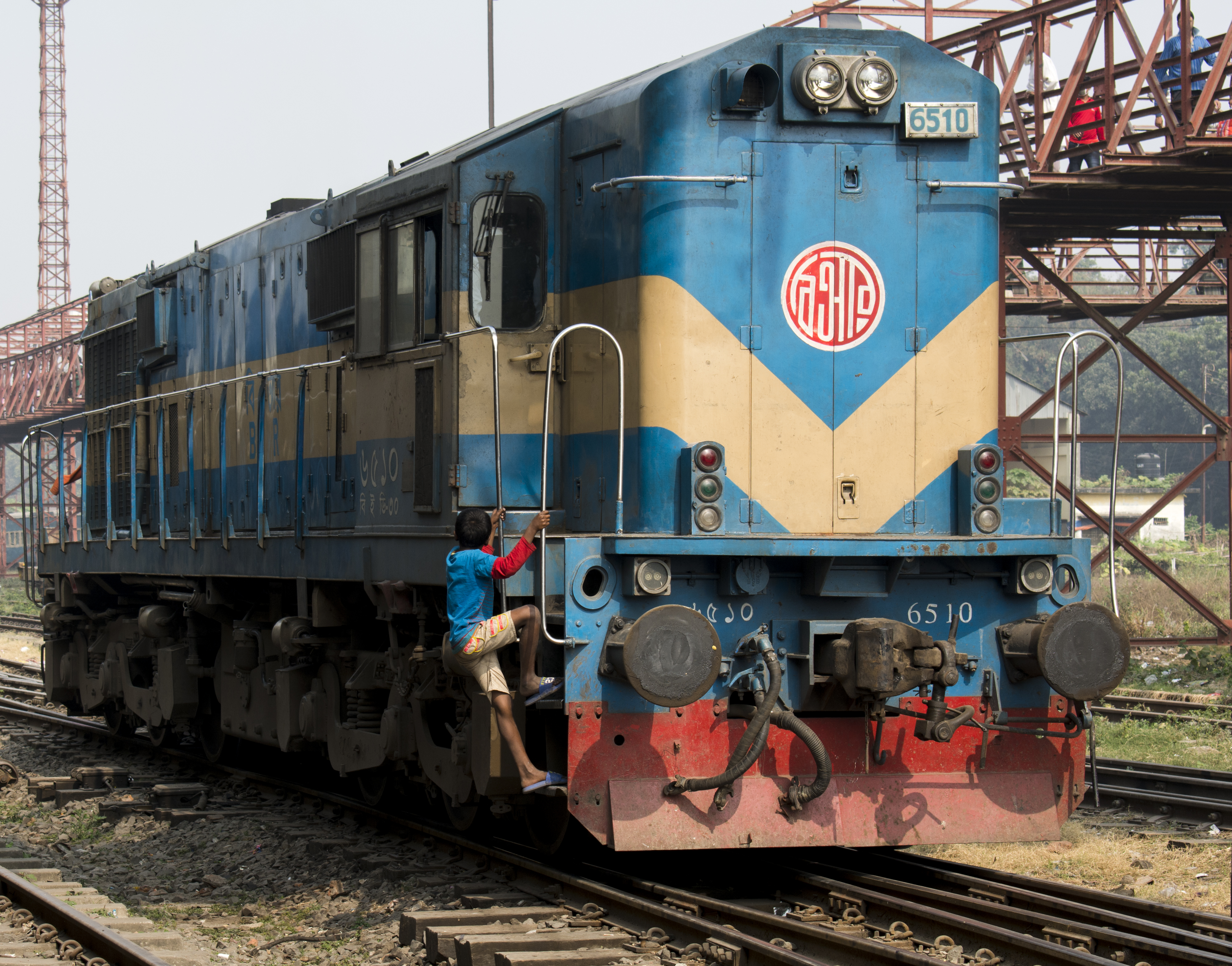
- Locomotive 6510 at Kamalapur railway station
Type and origin
- Power type: Diesel
- Builder: Banaras Locomotive Works
- Model: ALCO DL560C
- Build date: 2012 - 2014
- Total produced: 56; 26 BED-30 and 30 BED-33
Specifications
- Configuration
  - UIC: Co-Co
- Gauge: 1,676 mm (5 ft 6 in)
- Bogies: AlCo Asymmetric Cast Frame Trimount Bogie (BED-30); HAHS Bogie (BED-33)
- Fuel type: Diesel
- Fuel capacity: 5,000 L (1,100 imp gal; 1,300 US gal) (BED-30); 6,000 L (1,300 imp gal; 1,600 US gal) (BED-33)
- Prime mover: ALCO 251-B (BLW Uprated)
- RPM range: 390rpm-400rpm idling, 1050rpm at 8th notch
- Engine type: V16 Four-stroke diesel engine
- Aspiration: Turbo-supercharged
- Displacement: 175.14 L
- Cylinders: 16
- Cylinder size: 228.6 mm × 266.7 mm (9.00 in × 10.50 in) bore x stroke
- Transmission: Diesel-electric Microprocessor based AC-DC Transmission
- Gear ratio: 65:18
- MU working: 2
- Loco brake: Air Brake
- Train brakes: Air Brake
- Couplers: AAR Janney coupler, Buffers and chain coupler
Performance figures
- Maximum speed: 120 km/h (75 mph)(BED-30)
- Power output: 3,000 hp (2,200 kW) (BED-30); 3,300 hp (2,500 kW) (BED-33)
- Tractive effort: 30.45 tf (298.6 kN) (BED-30); 38.61 tf (378.6 kN) (BED-33)
Career
- Operators: Bangladesh Railway
- Class: BED-30; BED-33
- Numbers: 6501 - 6526 (BED-30); 6527 - 6556 (BED-33)
- Disposition: Active

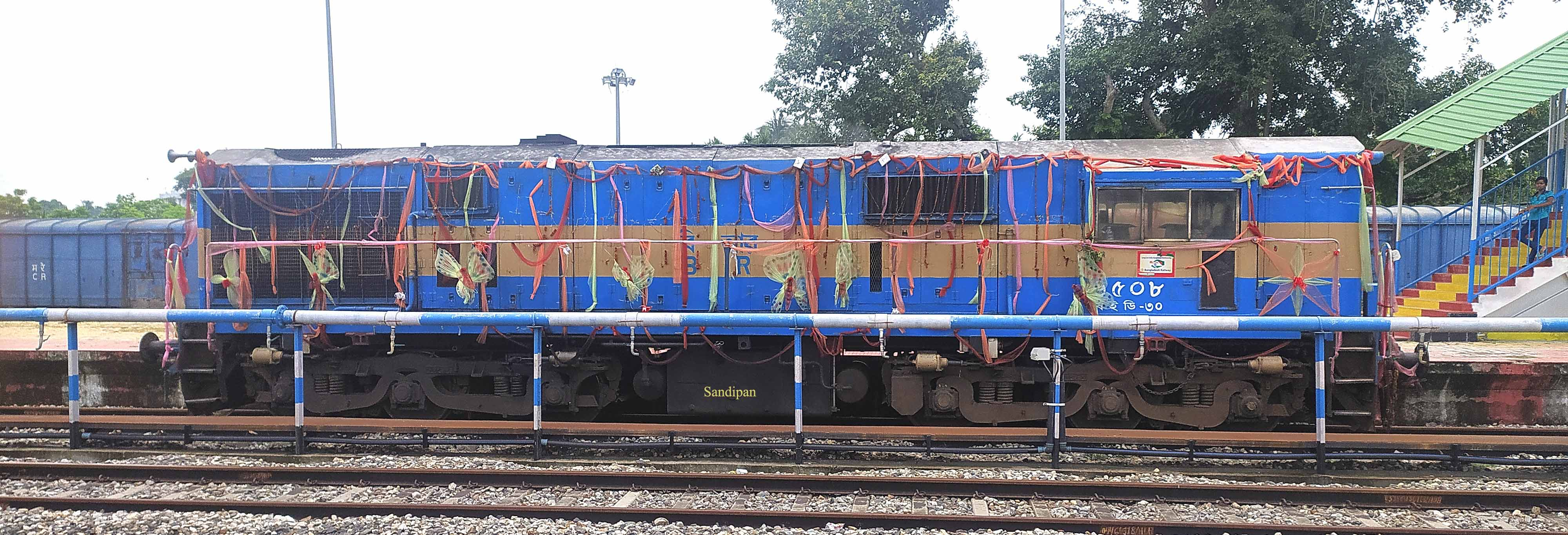
BED30 6508 in Haldibari India to Bring 13132 Mitalee Express (Sandipan)

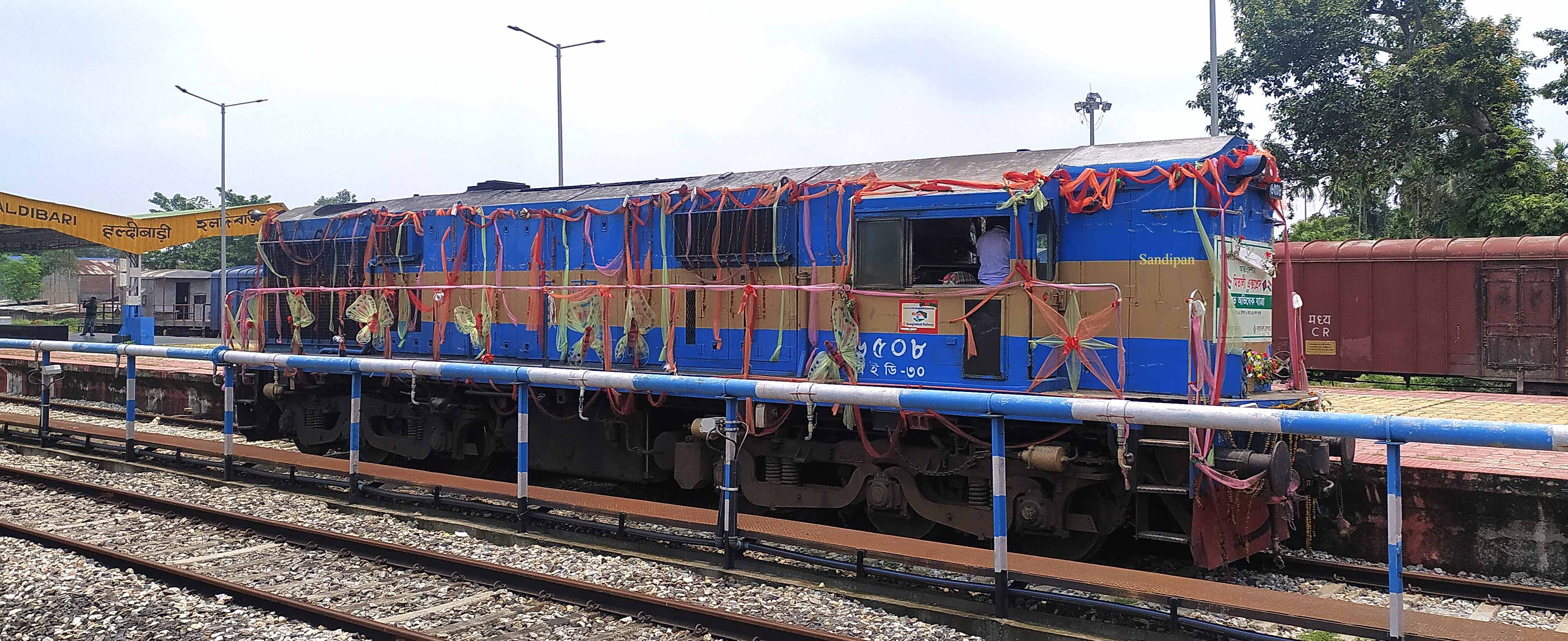
BED30 6508 in Haldibari India to Bring 13132 Mitalee Express (Sandipan)

Bangladesh Railway Class 6500 is a class of 1,676 mm gauge diesel-electric locomotives owned by Bangladesh Railway. There are 56 locomotives of this class, all manufactured by the Banaras Locomotive Works of India. All locomotives of this class are in service.

== Details ==
In 2012, Bangladesh Railway ordered broad-gauge diesel-electric locomotives from India, modeled as WDM-3A. These 26 locomotives were imported to Bangladesh in 2012, 2013 and 2014. These locomotives have a power of 3100 hp. They are fitted with AAR coupling and have a gear ratio of 65:18. These locomotives are marked as BED-30, which stands for broad gauge diesel-electric manufactured by DLW, engine with 30 * 100 hp (30), and numbered as 6501 - 6526.

On 27 July 2020, 10 WDM-3D units were imported from India under a "grant assistance" plan and marked as BED-33 The class name stands for broad gauge diesel-electric manufactured by DLW, engine with 33 * 100 hp (33) and numbered as 6527 - 6536. In the year of 2023 more 20 WDM-3D locomotives (6537 - 6556) has arrived to Bangladesh as gift from Indian government. These locos have a 3300 hp power pack, with maximum available traction power of 2925 hp.

== Liveries ==
Class 6500 locomotives have the deep blue-yellow and sky blue-yellow livery. BED-30s have the deep blue-yellow livery, and BED-33s have sky blue-yellow livery.

== Usage ==
Among all the class 6500 locomotives, BED-30 is basically used on both freight and passenger trains. Most high-end broad-gauge passenger trains like Padma Express, Drutajaan Express, Neelshagar Express, Rupsa Express, Shimanta Express, Ekota Express, Chitra Express Banalata Express, and Maitree Express are hauled by these locomotives. They are also used on some mail-express and commuter trains. After the arrival of the 66** series locomotives, 65** WDM-3A locomotives are hardly used on Dhaka-based broadgauge Intercity trais. On the other hand, BED-33 is usually only used on freight trains. Recently some Intercity trains are howling by 65** WDM-3D Locomotives like Rupsa Express, Simanata Express, Kopotaksha Express, Shagardari Express and Banglabandha Express.

== Gallery ==
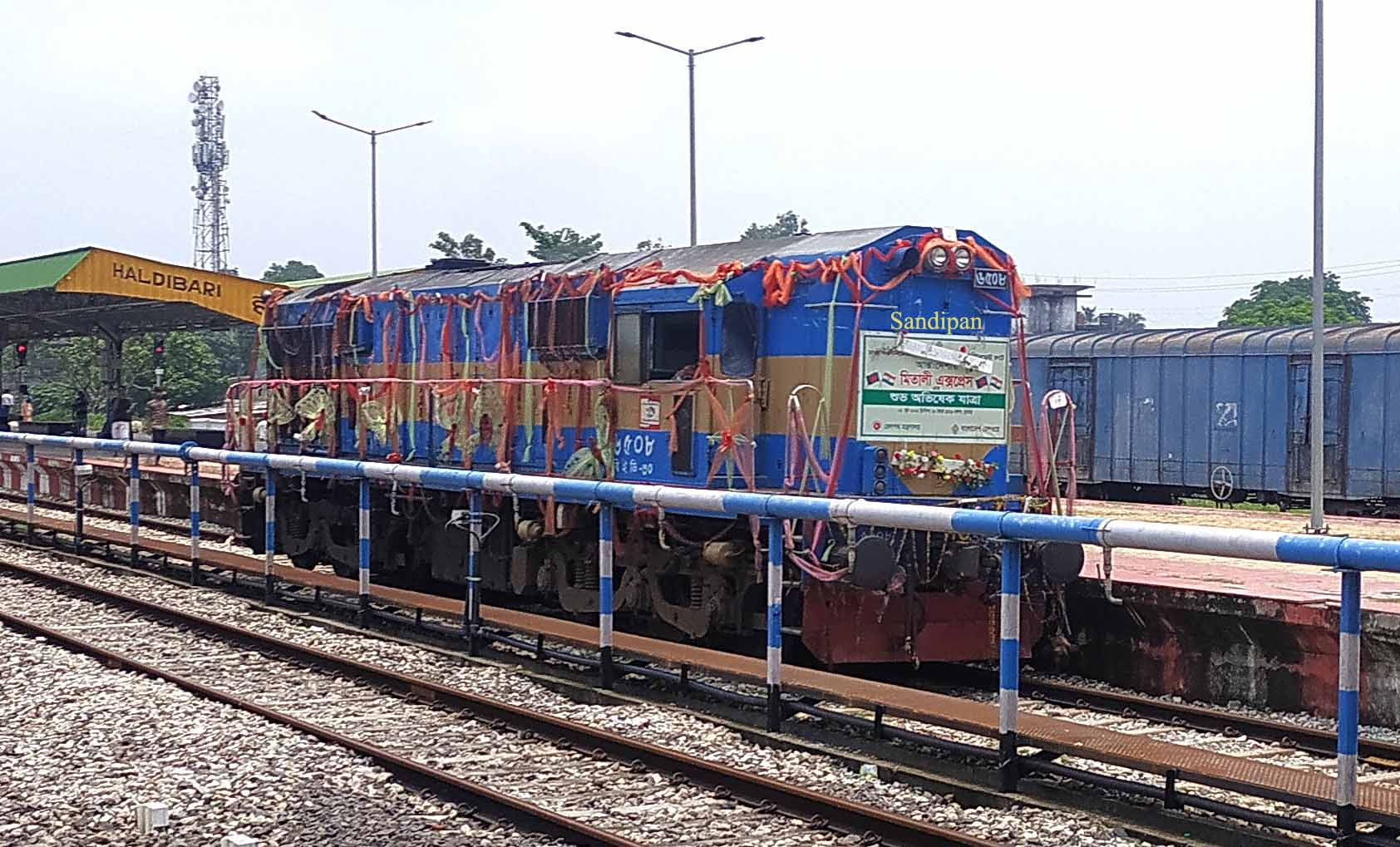
BED30 6508 in Haldibari India to Bring 13132 Mitalee Express (Sandipan)

=== BED-30 ===
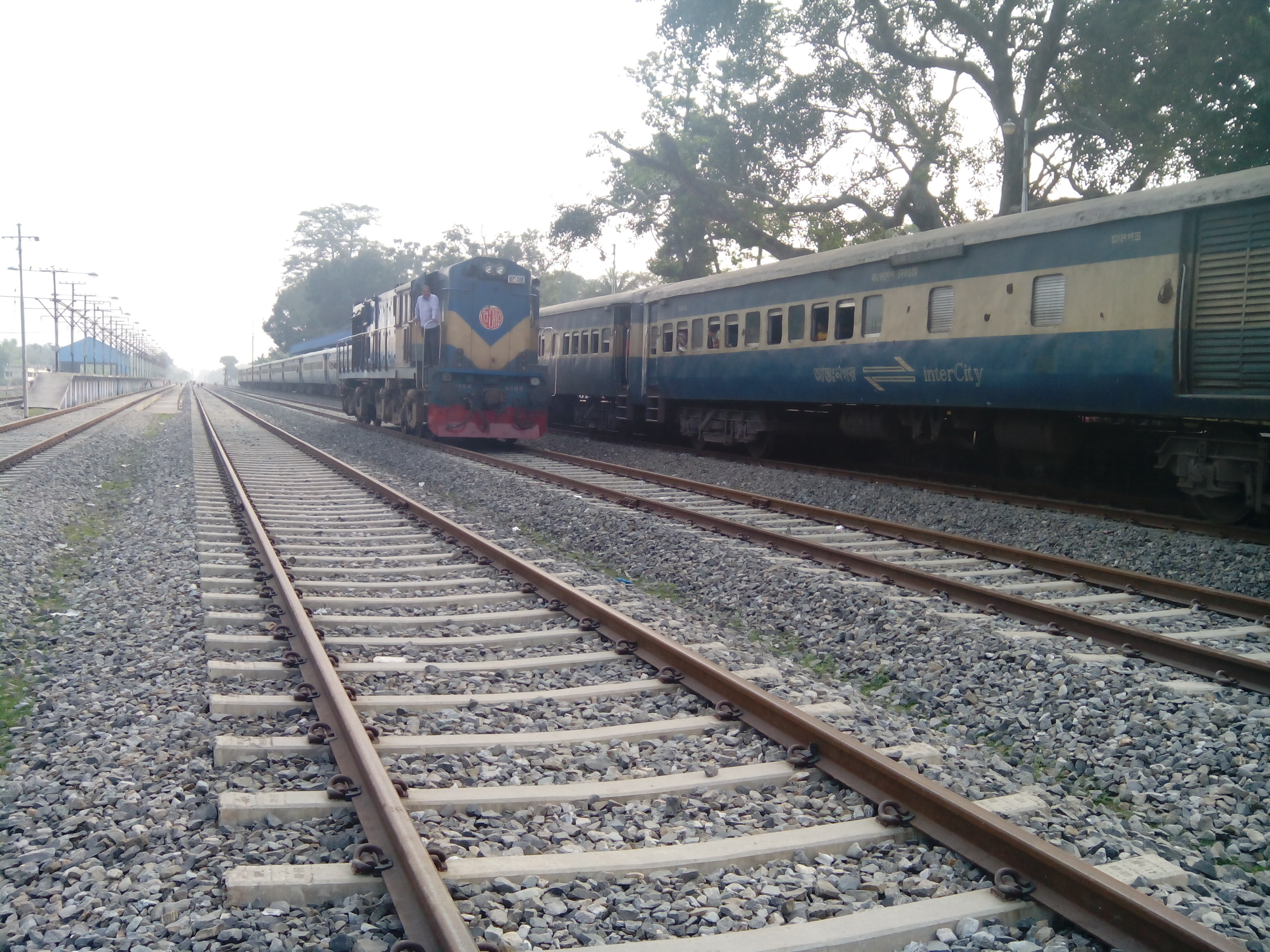
6509

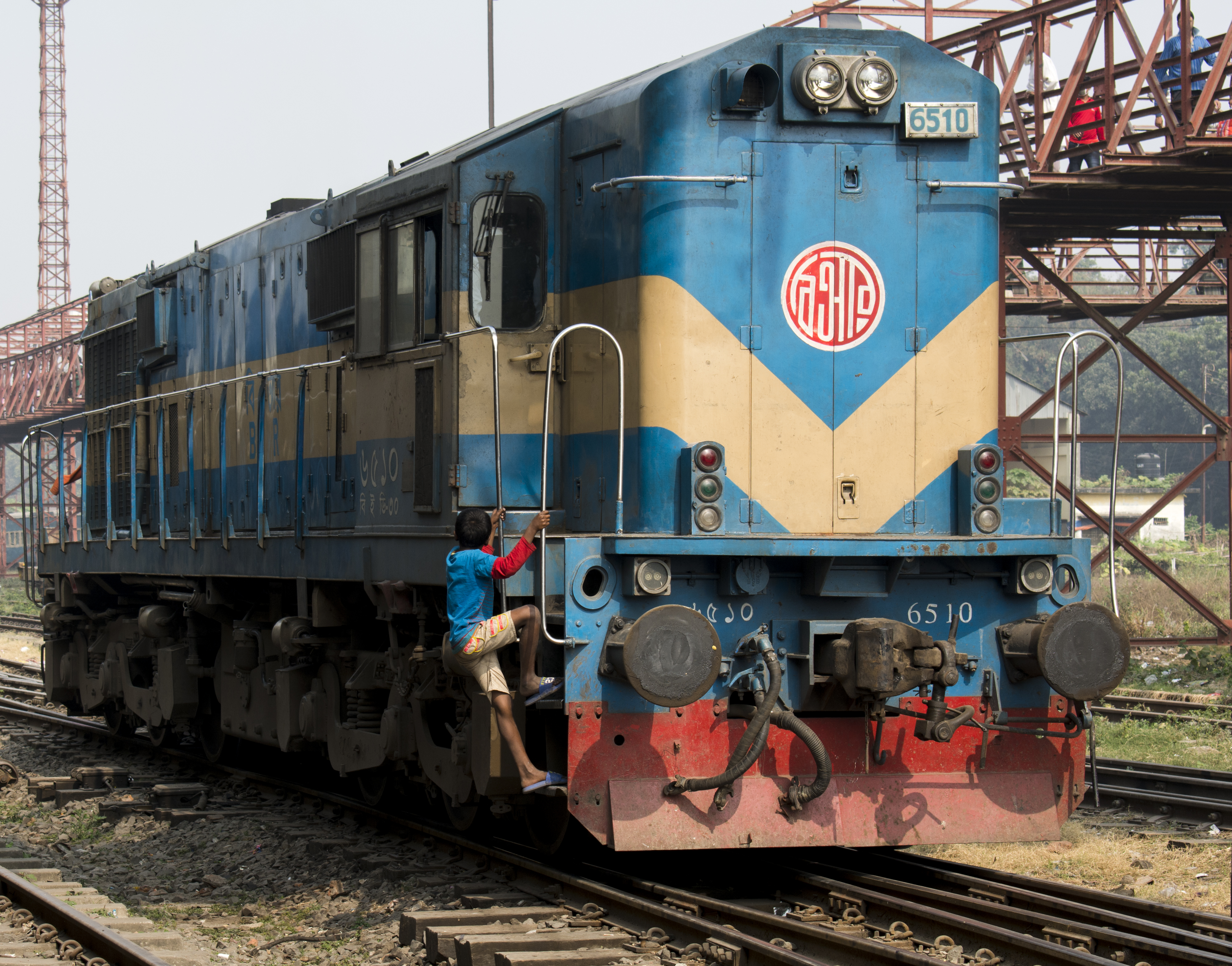
6510

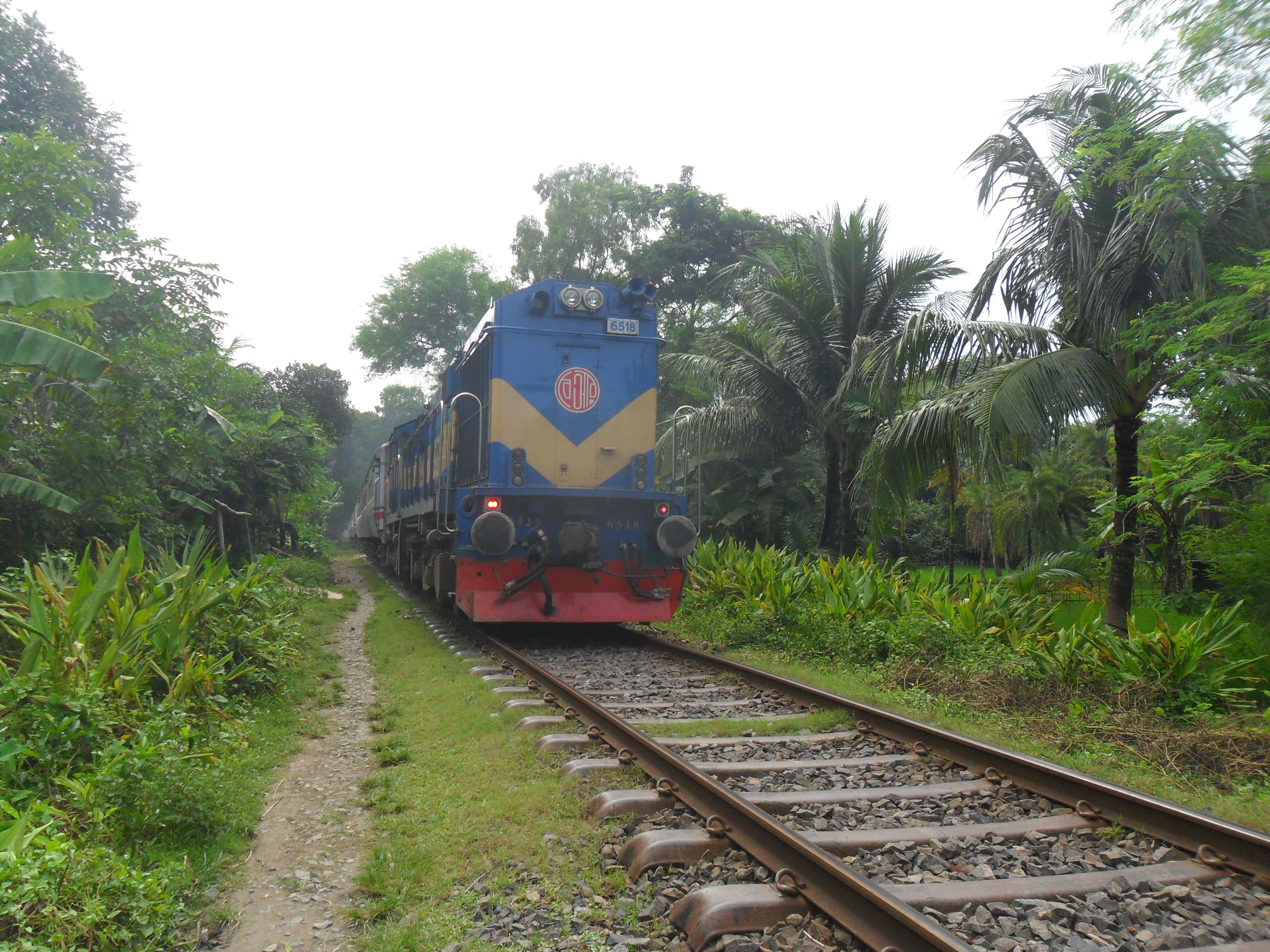
6518

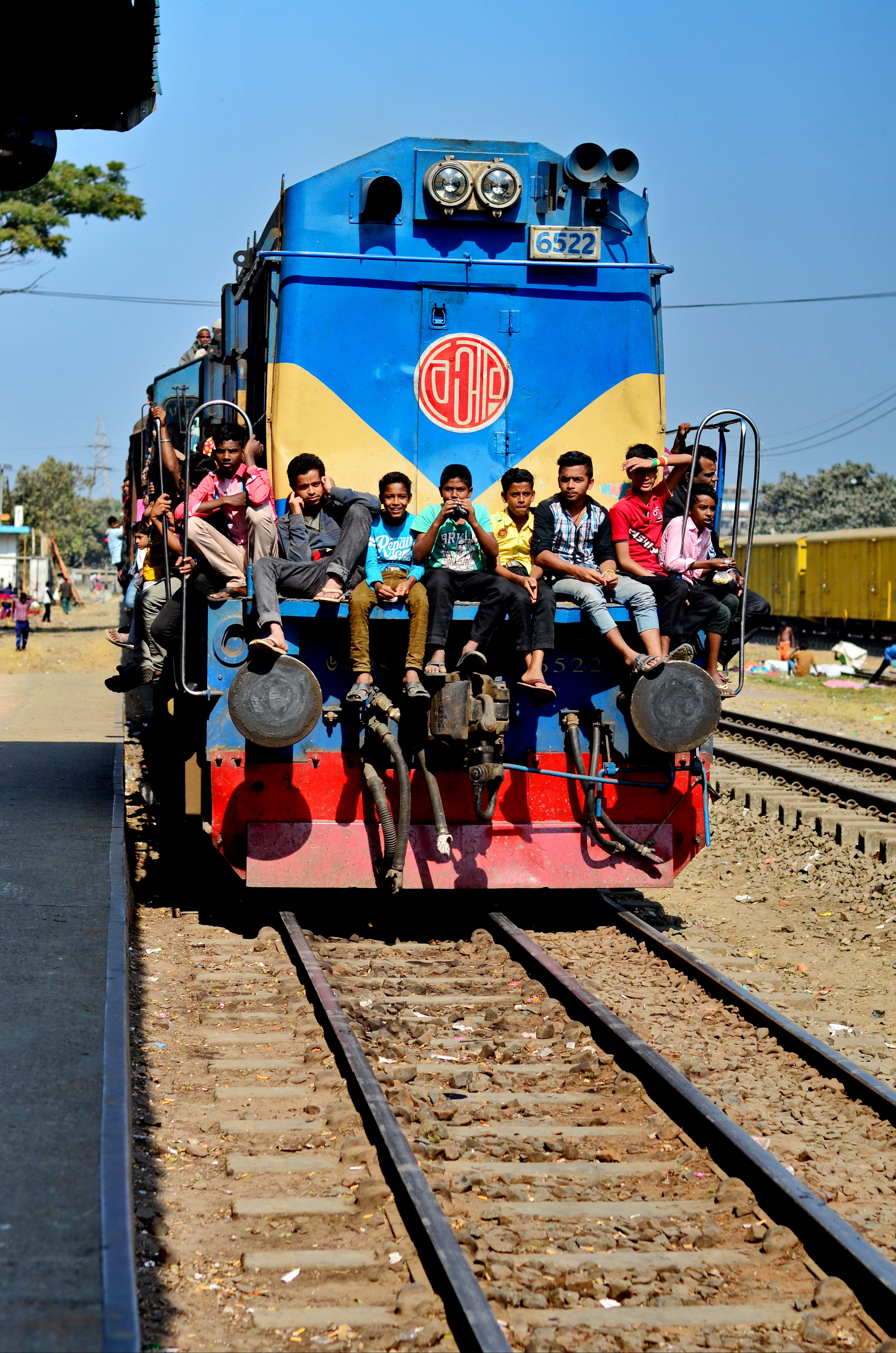
6522
