= Bangladesh Railway Class 2500 =

Class of diesel-electric locomotives

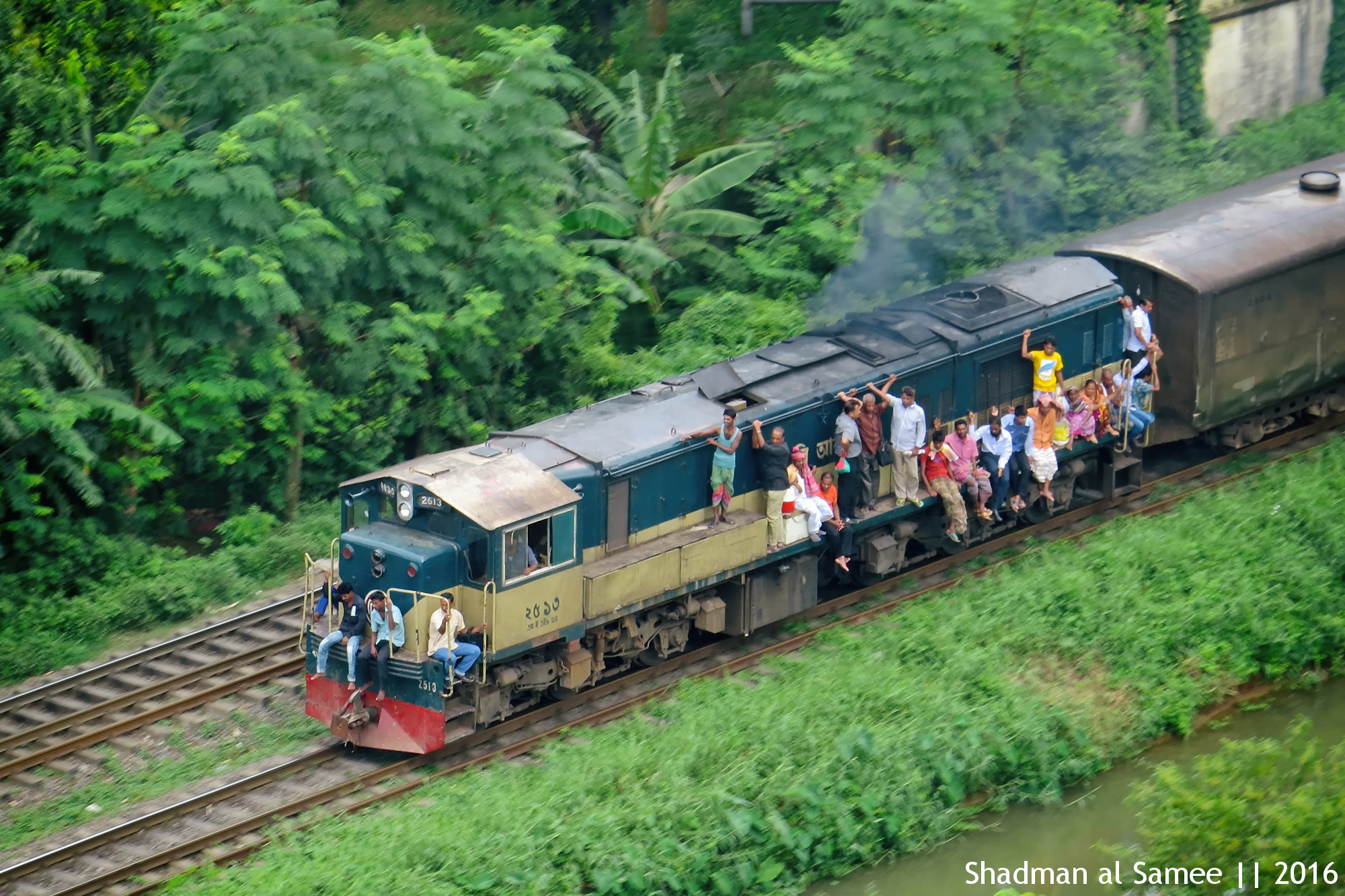
- Class 2500 locomotive no. 2513
Type and origin
- Power type: Diesel-electric
- Builder: Hitachi
- Model: HFA13A
- Build date: 1982
- Total produced: 18
Specifications
- Configuration
  - AAR: Co-Co
- Gauge: 1,000 mm (3 ft 3 3/8 in)
- Bogies: ALCO trimount
- Wheel diameter: 965 mm (38.0 in)
- Axle load: 12 t (26,000 lb)
- Loco weight: 72 t (71 long tons; 79 short tons)
- Fuel type: Diesel
- Fuel capacity: 3,000 L (660 imp gal; 790 US gal)
- Prime mover: ALCO 251B-6
- RPM range: 400–1,100 rpm
- Engine type: Four-stroke diesel engine
- Aspiration: Turbocharged
- Cylinders: 6
- Cylinder size: 228 mm × 267 mm (9.0 in × 10.5 in)
- Transmission: Diesel-electric
- Loco brake: Vacuum
Performance figures
- Maximum speed: 96 km/h (60 mph)
- Power output: 1,400 hp (1,000 kW)
Career
- Operators: Bangladesh Railway
- Class: MEH-14
- Numbers: 2501–2518
- Current owner: Bangladesh Railway

Bangladesh Railway Class 2500 is a class of metre-gauge diesel-electric locomotives operated by Bangladesh Railway. Built by Hitachi of Japan in 1982, a total of 18 units were produced. Classified as MEH-14, the locomotives are powered by an ALCO 251B-6 engine producing 1,400 hp (1,000 kW). The class is used in both passenger and freight services across Bangladesh's metre-gauge railway network.

== Specifications ==
The Class 2500 locomotives are rated at 1,400 hp (1,000 kW) and use the Hitachi model designation HFA13A. They have a Co-Co wheel arrangement and are fitted with an ALCO 251B-6 inline six-cylinder, four-stroke diesel engine with turbocharging. The engine operates within a speed range of 400 to 1,100 rpm and has a compression ratio of 12.5:1.

The locomotives are mounted on ALCO trimount bogies and have a total weight of 72 t (71 long tons; 79 short tons), with an axle load of 12 t (26,000 lb). The fuel tank capacity is 3,000 L (660 imp gal; 790 US gal).

The design and specifications are broadly similar to those of the Bangladesh Railway Class 2300, Bangladesh Railway Class 2400 and Bangladesh Railway Class 2800 locomotive classes.

== History ==
The Class 2500 locomotives were introduced in 1982 as part of Bangladesh Railway's expansion of its metre-gauge diesel locomotive fleet. During this period, Bangladesh Railway relied extensively on diesel-electric locomotives based on ALCO-derived designs for both passenger and freight operations.

Like other locomotive classes in Bangladesh, the Class 2500 forms part of an aging rolling stock fleet that has required ongoing maintenance and modernization efforts in recent decades.

== Classification and numbering ==
The class designation MEH-14 follows Bangladesh Railway's locomotive classification system, where:

- M indicates metre gauge
- E indicates diesel-electric transmission
- H indicates the manufacturer, Hitachi
- 14 denotes a power rating of 1,400 horsepower

The locomotives are numbered sequentially from 2501 to 2518.

== Service ==
Class 2500 locomotives are employed in both passenger and freight operations on the metre-gauge network of Bangladesh Railway. They are typically allocated to services requiring moderate power and are used on a variety of routes across the network. These locomotives operate within a railway system that has faced challenges related to aging diesel fleets and maintenance capacity.

The primary depot for the class is Kamalapur in Dhaka, although locomotives may be transferred between depots depending on operational requirements.

== Maintenance ==
Maintenance of the Class 2500 locomotives is carried out at the following facilities:

- Central Locomotive Workshop (CLW), Parbatipur, Dinajpur District
- Diesel Workshop, Pahartali, Chattogram
