= Bangladesh Railway Class 2200 =

Bangladeshi train

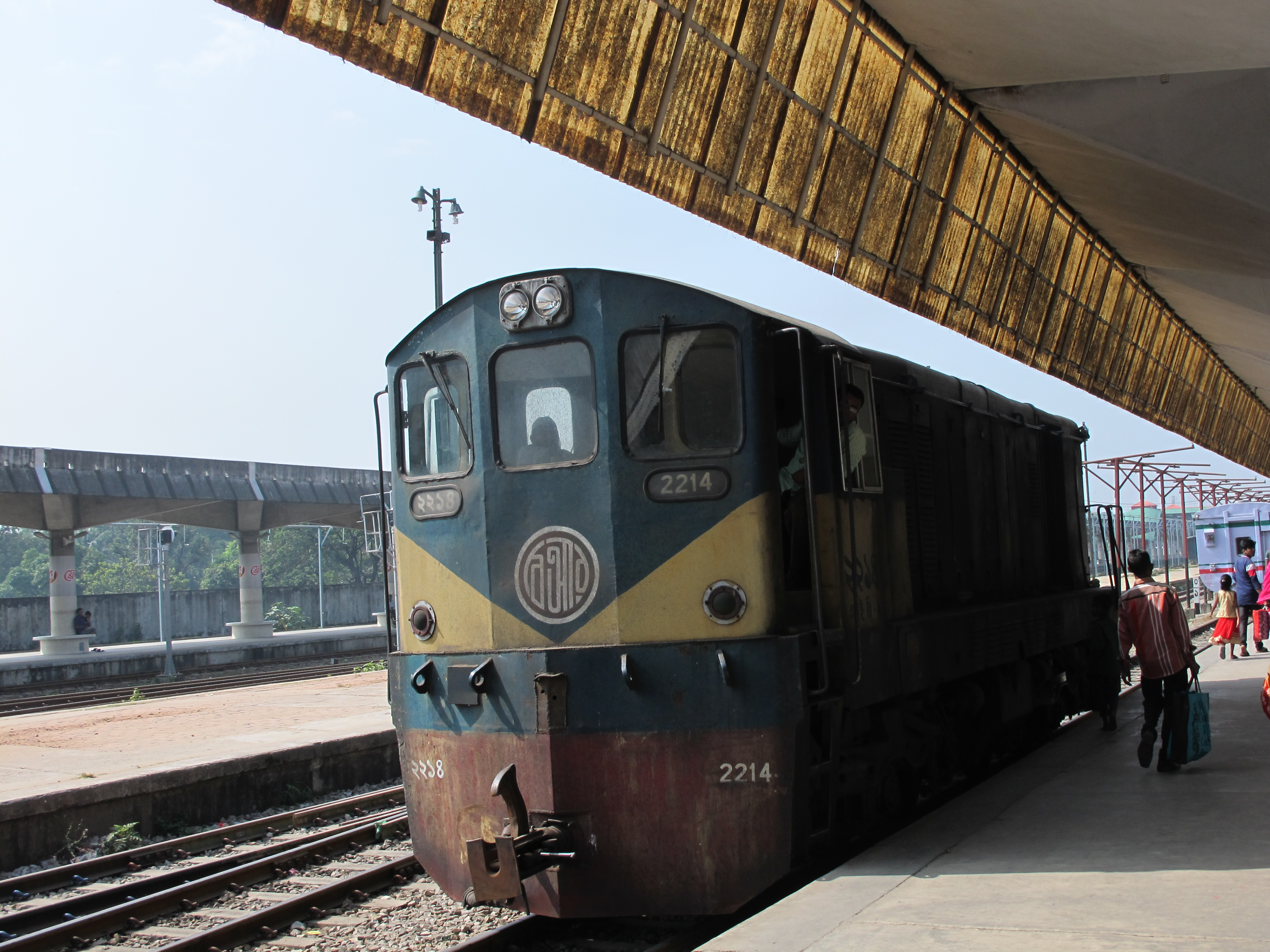
- Locomotive 2214 in 2017
Type and origin
- Power type: Diesel-electric
- Designer: Electro-Motive Division
- Builder: General Motors Diesel
- Order number: 702646–702666 (1961); 700523–700542 (1963)
- Serial number: 26189–26209 (1961); 27803–27822 (1963)
- Model: EMD GL8
- Build date: 1961, 1963
- Total produced: 41
Specifications
- Configuration
  - AAR: A1A-A1A
- Gauge: 1,000 mm (3 ft 3 3/8 in)
- Wheel diameter: 40 in (1,000 mm)
- Length: 36 ft (11 m)
- Loco weight: 64 tonnes
- Prime mover: EMD 8-567B
- Engine type: Two-stroke
- Aspiration: Roots-type supercharger
- Generator: EMD D25 (DC)
- Traction motors: EMD D47 (DC)
- Transmission: Diesel-electric
Performance figures
- Maximum speed: 124 km/h (77 mph)
- Power output: 875 hp (652 kW)
Career
- Operators: Bangladesh Railway
- Class: MEG-9
- Numbers: 2201–2241
- First run: 1961
- Disposition: 22 active (as of 2020)

Bangladesh Railway Class 2200 is a class of metre-gauge diesel-electric locomotives operated by Bangladesh Railway. A total of 41 locomotives of this class entered the fleet of the then Eastern Bengal Railway in 1961 and 1963.

Upon introduction, these locomotives were used in almost all types of passenger trains. Due to their old age, they are no longer used in passenger service and are now only used in shunting.

== Builders details ==
Class 2200 locomotives were manufactured by General Motors Diesel (GMD) in London, Ontario, Canada. Their model is the EMD GL8. The 41 locomotives came to the then East Pakistan in two phases:

- 1961: 2201–2221 (serial numbers 26189–26209, order #702646–702666)
- 1963: 2222–2241 (serial numbers 27803–27822, order #700523–700542)

Besides East Pakistan, 108 more EMD GL8 locomotives were also produced for Taiwan, Brazil, Ireland, and Tunisia. They share many similarities and some differences with the Class 2200 locomotives.

== Technical details ==
Class 2200 locomotives use the EMD 8-567B as prime mover. Their power output is 875 horsepower (652 kW) and they can achieve a maximum speed of 124 kilometres per hour (77 mph). The wheel arrangement is A1A-A1A. These locomotives are considered one of the most successful locomotive classes of Bangladesh Railway. As of 2020, 22 locomotives of this class remain active, some 57–59 years after their introduction.

== Classification and numbering ==
The number series of these locomotives is 2200, numbered from 2201 to 2241. Their class name/specification is MEG-9, where:

- M = Metre-gauge
- E = Diesel-electric
- G = GMD (General Motors Diesel)
- 9 = 9 × 100 = 900 hp (nominal; actual output is 875 hp)

== Liveries ==
The Class 2200 has carried the following liveries during its service life:

1. Green and yellow (Eastern Bengal Railway livery) — no longer used
2. Red with white stripes — no longer used
3. Blue
4. Green and yellow (reintroduced)
5. Green

== Maintenance ==
The Class 2200 fleet is maintained at the following workshops:

1. Chittagong (CGPY)
2. Pahartoli
3. Dhaka
4. Parbatipur

== Operators ==
Operator	Period
Eastern Bengal Railway	1961
Pakistan Eastern Railway	1961–1971
Bangladesh Railway	1971–present
