= Bangladesh Railway Class 2800 =

Class of diesel-electric locomotives

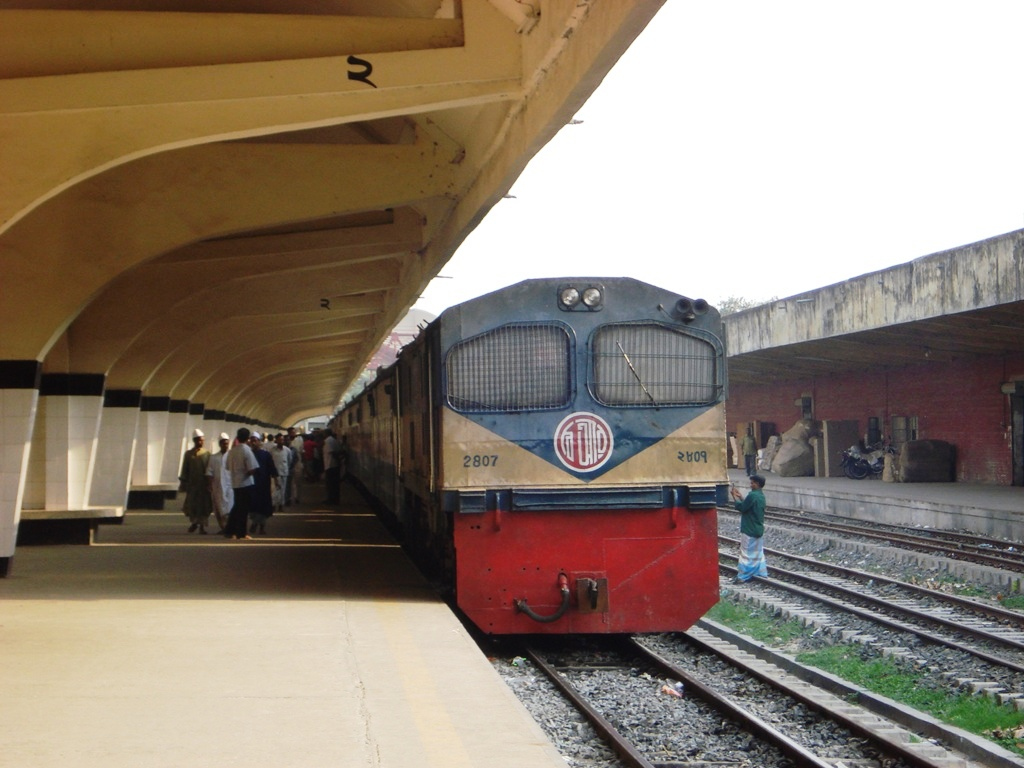
- Locomotive 2807 at Kamalapur railway station with the Jamuna Express
Type and origin
- Power type: Diesel-Electric
- Designer: ALCO, BLW
- Builder: Banaras Locomotive Works
- Model: DL535A/RSD-30 (YDM-4BR)
- Build date: 1996
- Total produced: 10 Units
Specifications
- Configuration
  - AAR: Co'Co'
- Gauge: 1,000 mm (3 ft 3 3/8 in)
- Bogies: ALCO Asymmetric cast frame trimount
- Wheel diameter: 965 mm (37.99 in)
- Length: 15.60 m (51.18 ft)
- Width: 2,730 mm (8 ft 11½ in)
- Height: 3.635 m (11.9 ft)
- Axle load: 12,000 kg (26,000 lb)
- Fuel type: Diesel
- Fuel capacity: 3,000 litres (660 imp gal; 790 US gal)
- Prime mover: Alco 251B-6
- RPM range: 400–1,100 rpm
- Engine type: 4-Stroke Diesel Engine
- Aspiration: Turbo-supercharged
- Cylinders: 6
- Cylinder size: 228 mm × 267 mm bore × stroke
- Transmission: Diesel-Electric
- Loco brake: Vacuum
- Couplers: Norwegian
Performance figures
- Maximum speed: 96 km/h (60 mph)
- Power output: 1,400 hp (1,000 kW)
Career
- Operators: Bangladesh Railway
- Class: MED-14
- Numbers: 2801–2810
- Current owner: Bangladesh Railway
- Disposition: 5 Active; 5 Out of Service

Bangladesh Railway Class 2800 is a class of metre-gauge diesel-electric locomotive operated by Bangladesh Railway. A total of 10 locomotives of this class were manufactured by Banaras Locomotive Works (BLW), India. They entered the fleet of Bangladesh Railway in 1996 and are used exclusively in passenger trains. As of 2020, after 24 years of service — four years beyond the recognised economic life of 20 years for a locomotive — only 5 of the 10 locomotives remain active.

== Details ==
The Class 2800 is derived from the Indian Railway YDM-4 class, the most widely used metre-gauge diesel locomotive on Indian Railways, first introduced by ALCO in 1961 and subsequently manufactured domestically by Banaras Locomotive Works (BLW), Varanasi, from 1968 onwards. In 1996, 10 YDM-4 class locomotives of Indian Railways were converted from their original hood unit configuration to a dual-cab arrangement and exported to Bangladesh, where they were classified as the 2800 series. This conversion was achieved without altering the overall length of the locomotive. Bangladesh Railway designated this variant the YDM-4BR. The dual-cab modification later caused significant cooling problems in service.

These are 1,400 hp locomotives with the model designation DL535A/RSD-30. The wheel arrangement is Co'Co' and the prime mover is a 6-cylinder ALCO 251B-6 engine. They have specifications closely similar to Bangladesh Railway Class 2300, Bangladesh Railway Class 2400 and Bangladesh Railway Class 2500 locomotives.

== Classification and numbering ==
The class-name/specification of the Class 2800 locomotives is MED-14. Here, M = Metre-gauge, E = Diesel-Electric, D = DLW (Banaras Locomotive Works) and 14 = 14 × 100 hp = 1,400 hp. The locomotives are numbered from 2801 to 2810.

== Service and operations ==
Class 2800 locomotives are used exclusively in passenger trains, and have never been used in freight workings. Within passenger service, they are used for local, commuter, and mail/express trains. Previously, they were also deployed on inter-city services such as the Jamuna Express and the Egaroshindhur Provati/Godhuli Express, but are no longer assigned to any inter-city workings.

According to Bangladesh Railway authorities, the economic life of a locomotive is 20 years. As the Class 2800 entered service in 1996, the fleet's economic lifespan expired in 2016. As of 2018, Bangladesh Railway reported that 195 of its 273 locomotives had exceeded their service life, with the metre-gauge fleet of 179 locomotives being particularly affected.

== Livery ==
Class 2800 locomotives have been operated in two colour schemes:

- Blue and yellow
- Green and yellow

== Maintenance ==
Class 2800 locomotives are maintained at the following workshops:

- Central Locomotive Workshop (CLW), Parbatipur, Dinajpur
- Diesel Workshop, Pahartali, Chattogram
- Diesel Workshop, Dhaka
