= Bangladesh Railway Class 6600 =

Bangladesh Class 6600
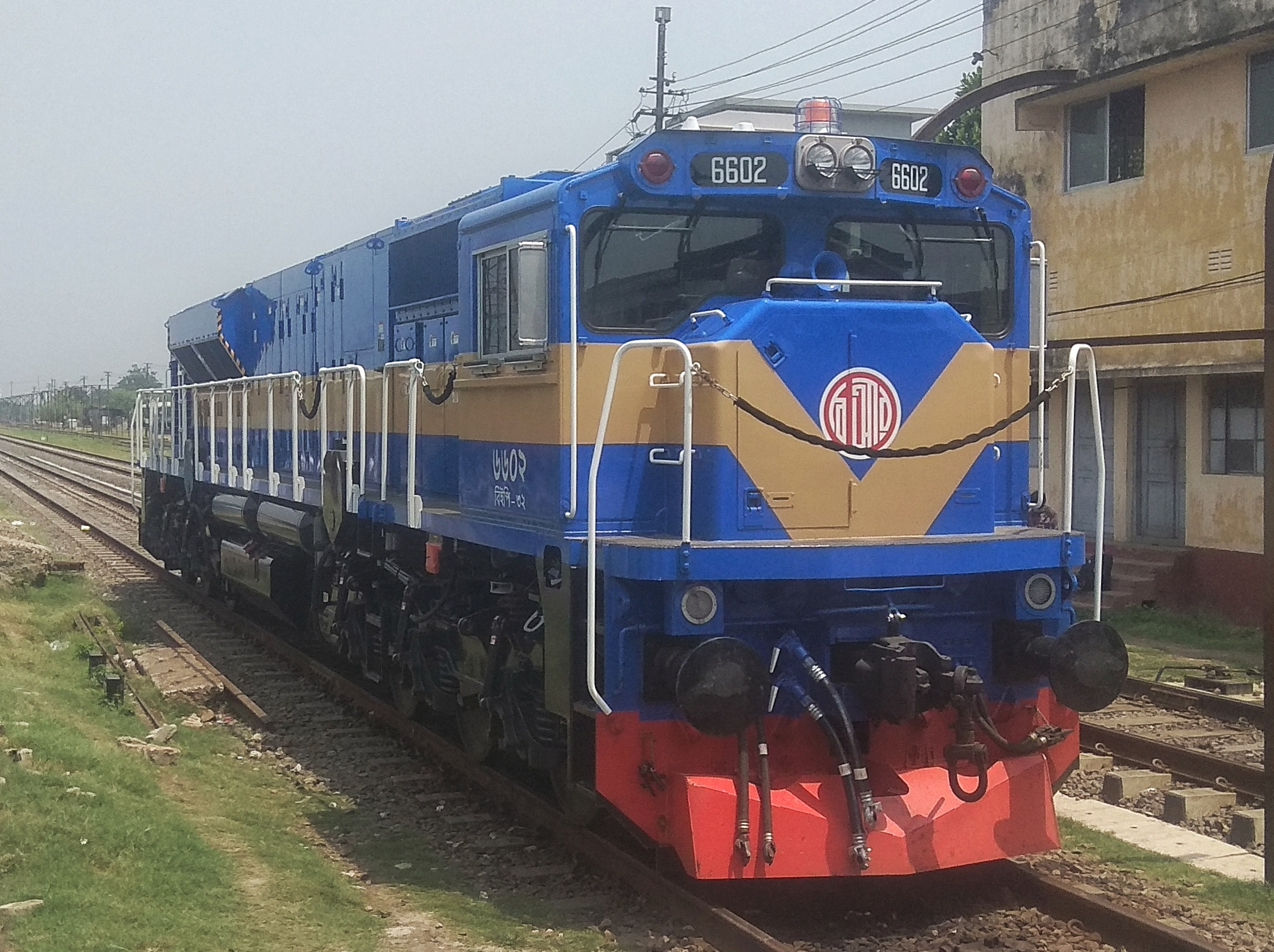
- Locomotive 6602
Type and origin
- Power type: Diesel
- Builder: Electro-Motive Diesel
- Model: EMD GT42ACL
- Build date: 2019 - present
- Total produced: 40
Specifications
- Configuration
  - UIC: Co-Co
- Gauge: 1,676 mm (5 ft 6 in)
- Fuel type: Diesel
- Prime mover: 12N-710G3B-EES
- Transmission: Diesel-electric Microprocessor based AC-AC Transmission
Performance figures
- Maximum speed: 100Km/h (Locked) & 140km/h (Unlocked)
- Power output: 3,250 hp (2,420 kW)
Career
- Operators: Bangladesh Railway
- Numbers: 6601 - 6640
- Disposition: Active

The Bangladesh Railway Class 6600 is a class of 1,676 mm gauge diesel-electric locomotives owned by Bangladesh Railway. There are 40 locomotives of this class, all designed and manufactured by American company Progress Rail's Electro-Motive Diesel subsidiary. Class 6600 locomotives are used on both freight and passenger trains. Those are the strongest and most advanced broad-gauge locomotives in the Bangladesh Railway.

== History ==
In 2019, the Bangladesh Railway ordered broad-gauge diesel-electric locomotives from American manufacturer Electro-Motive Diesel for ৳ 1,123.5 crore. The model of Class 6600 locomotives is EMD GT42ACL. These are equipped with the EM2000 microprocessor control and AC traction motors. The prime mover is 12N-710G3B-EES and wheel arrangement Co-Co. The power is 3,250 hp. The EM2000 microprocessor control has excitation and load control, adhesion control, engine control, diagnostic system and archived unit history data.
