= Indian locomotive class WDM-3A =

Indian Railway class diesel locomotive

WDM-3A
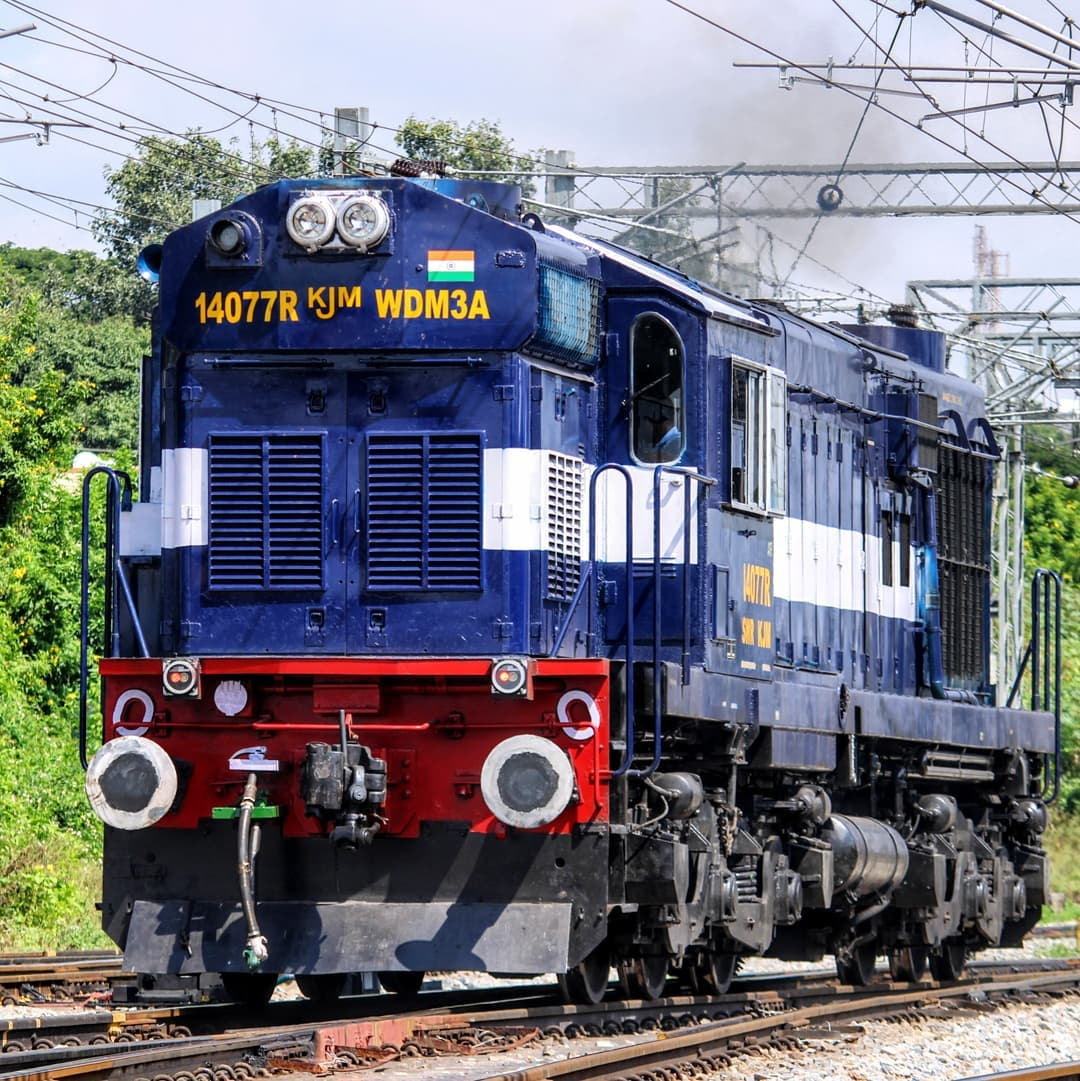
- Krishnarajapuram based WDM-3A at Yeshwantpur.
Type and origin
- Power type: Diesel–electric
- Designer: BLW, RDSO
- Builder: BLW, PLW
- Model: Alco DL560C
- Build date: 1994–2015
- Total produced: WDM-3A: 1402
- Rebuilder: PLW, Parel workshop
Specifications
- Configuration
  - UIC: Co′Co′
  - Commonwealth: Co-Co
- Gauge: 1,676 mm (5 ft 6 in)
- Bogies: AlCo Asymmetric Cast Steel Trimount Bogie (Old), Advance Trimount High Speed (ATHS) fabricated bogie (New)
- Wheel diameter: 1,092 mm (3 ft 7.0 in)
- Wheelbase
  - Axle spacing (Asymmetrical): 1,702 mm (5 ft 7 in); 2,108 mm (6 ft 11 in)
- Pivot centres: 10,516 mm (34 ft 6 in)
- Length
  - Over couplers: 17,132 mm (56 ft 2 1/2 in)
  - Over beams: 15,862 mm (52 ft 1/2 in)
- Width: 2,900 mm (9 ft 6 1/8 in)
- Height: 4,185 mm (13 ft 8 3/4 in)
- Axle load: 18.8 t (18.5 long tons; 20.7 short tons)
- Loco weight: 112.8 t (111.0 long tons; 124.3 short tons)
- Fuel type: Diesel
- Fuel capacity: 5,000 L (1,100 imp gal; 1,300 US gal)
- Lubricant cap.: 1,270 L (280 imp gal; 340 US gal)
- Coolant cap.: 1,210 L (270 imp gal; 320 US gal)
- Sandbox cap.: 160 L (35 imp gal; 42 US gal)
- Prime mover: Alco 251-B (BLW Uprated)
- RPM range: 400–1050 rpm
- Engine type: V16 Four-stroke diesel engine
- Aspiration: ABB VTC304-VG15 OR Napier NA-295IR OR GE 7S1716 Turbo-supercharged
- Displacement: 175.14 L (38.53 imp gal; 46.27 US gal)
- Alternator: BHEL TA10102CW
- Generator: BHEL AG2702AZ (Old), BHEL AG3101AY-1 (New)
- Traction motors: BHEL TM4906AZ or BHEL TM4907BZ
  - Rating 1 hour: 1060 amps
  - Continuous: 1000 amps
- Cylinders: 16
- Cylinder size: 228.6 mm × 266.7 mm (9.00 in × 10.50 in) bore x stroke
- Transmission: Diesel–electric AC-DC Transmission
- Gear ratio: 18:65
- MU working: 2
- Loco brake: Air Brake, Dynamic Brake, Hand Brake
- Train brakes: Air Brake
- Compressor: 2,266 L/min (@ 400 rpm), 5,665 L/min (@ 1000 rpm)
Performance figures
- Maximum speed: 120 km/h (75 mph)
- Power output: Max: 3100 HP/ 3300 HP (Rebuilt); Site rated: 2900 HP/ 3007 HP
- Tractive effort: 30.45 tf (298.6 kN) @ 27% adhesion
- Factor of adh.: 2.6
- Brakeforce: 22 tf (220 kN)
Career
- Operators: Indian Railways Bangladesh Railway
- Numbers: 13xxx, 14001-14057, 14058-14143, 16000-, few in 18xxx series and 17xxx series
- Nicknames: Cheetah, Prabal, Velociti, Awadh, Firex, Sher Punjab, Veer
- Preserved: 1
- Disposition: active

The Indian locomotive class WDM-3A is a class of diesel–electric locomotive that was developed in 1993 by Banaras Locomotive Works (BLW), Varanasi for the Indian Railways. The model name stands for broad gauge (W), Diesel (D), Mixed traffic (M) engine, with 3300 horsepower (3A). The WDM-3A is a later classification of earlier WDM-2C. They entered service in 1994. A total of 143+ were built at ALCO and Banaras Locomotive Works between 1994 and 2003 with rest of the 1246 units being rebuilt from WDM-2 which made them the most numerous class of mainline diesel locomotive until the WDG-4.

The WDM-3A is one of the most successful locomotives of Indian Railways serving both passenger and freight trains for over 26 years. A few WDM-3A units were exported to neighboring countries like Sri Lanka and Bangladesh. Due to the introduction of more modern types of locomotives like WDG-4 and WDG-4G and electrification, a very small number of units are still in use, both in mainline and departmental duties. As of September 2026, 116 locomotives retain "operational status" on the mainline as WDM-3A. The loco was widely used across India for long-distance passenger trains due to its ruggedness, high tractive loads and acceleration. Now due to ageing fleet, it is gradually being withdrawn from service, condemned and scrapped.

== History ==
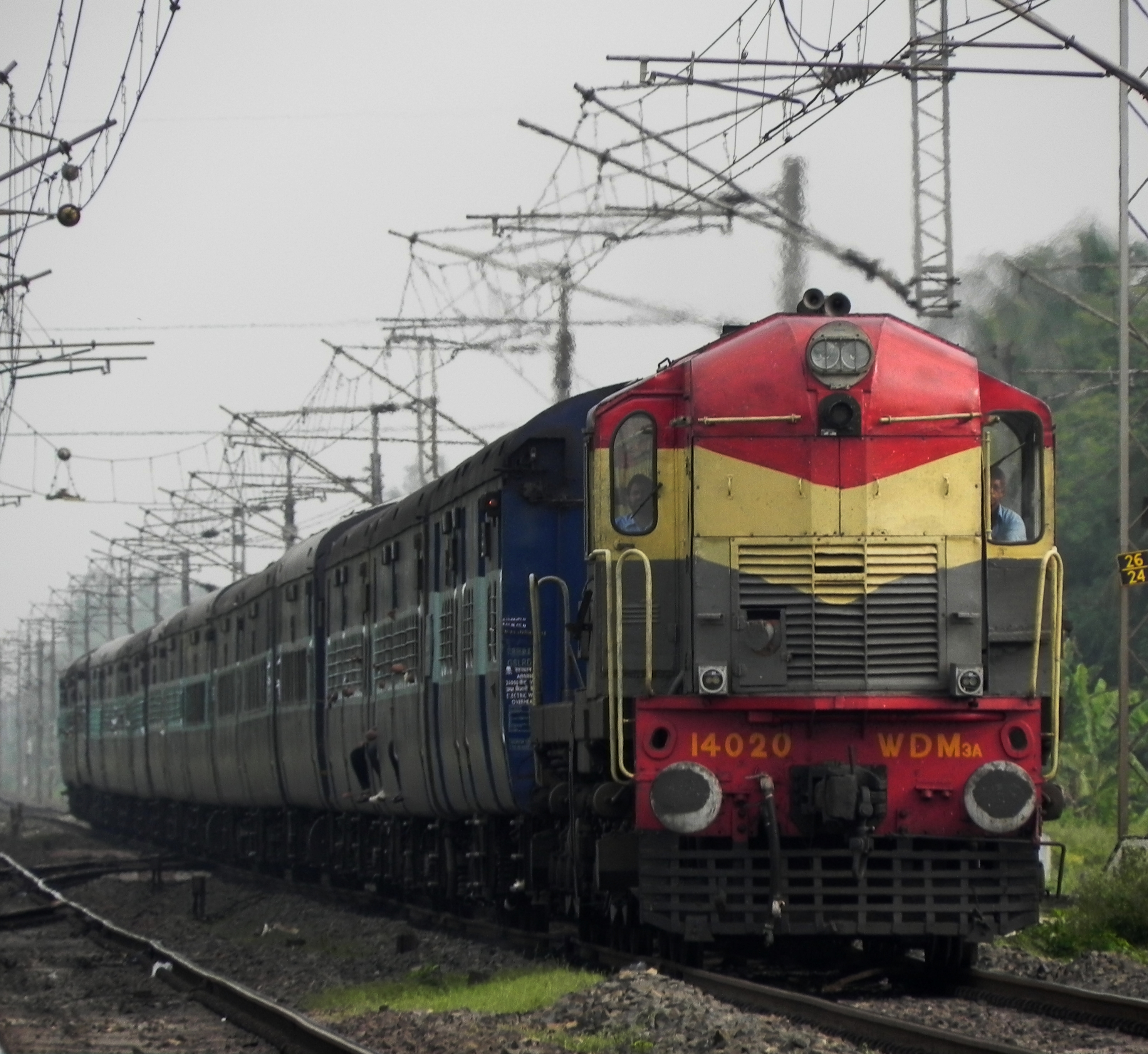
WDM-3A with Padatik Express

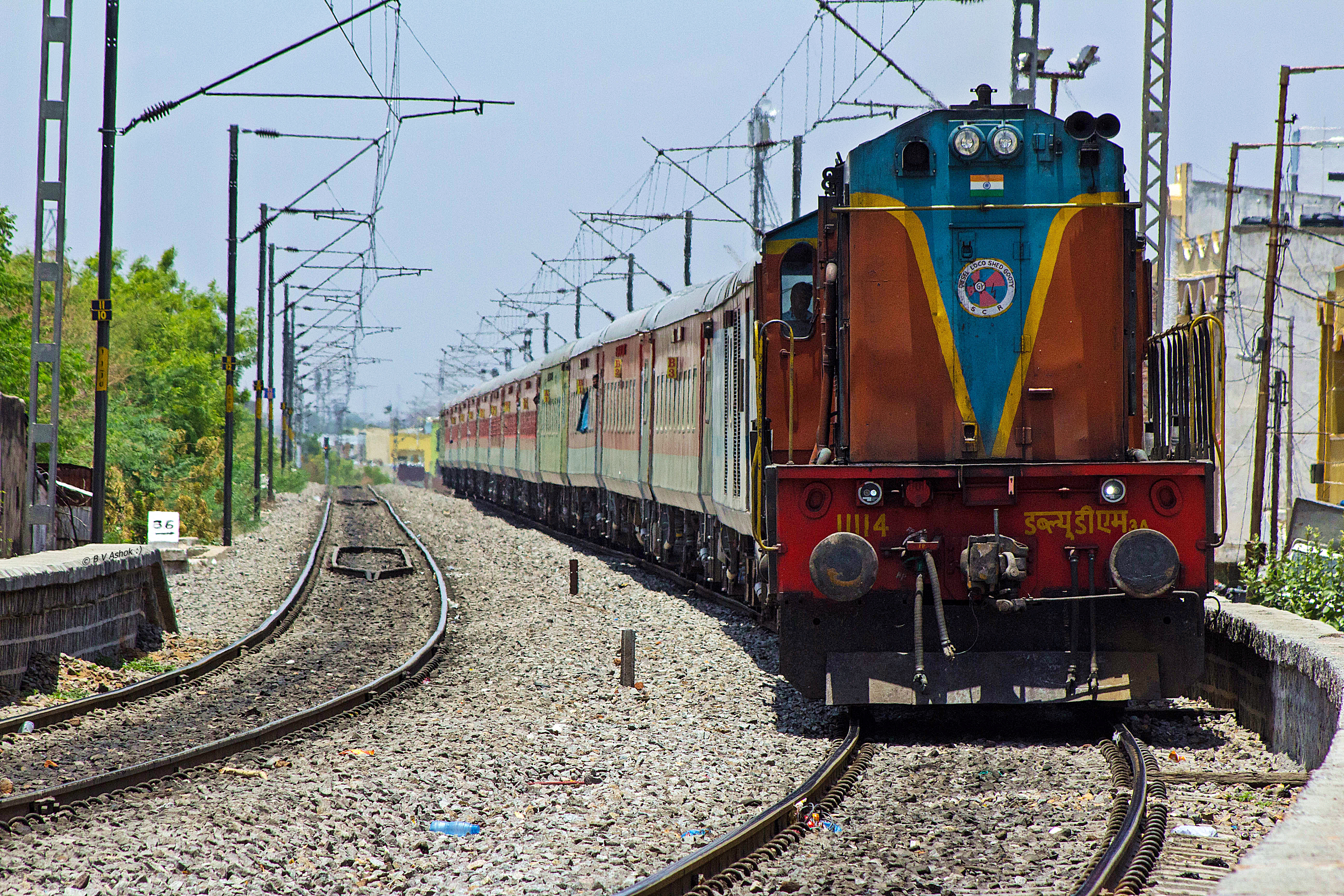
A WDM-3A loco from Gooty Loco Shed hauling an Express train

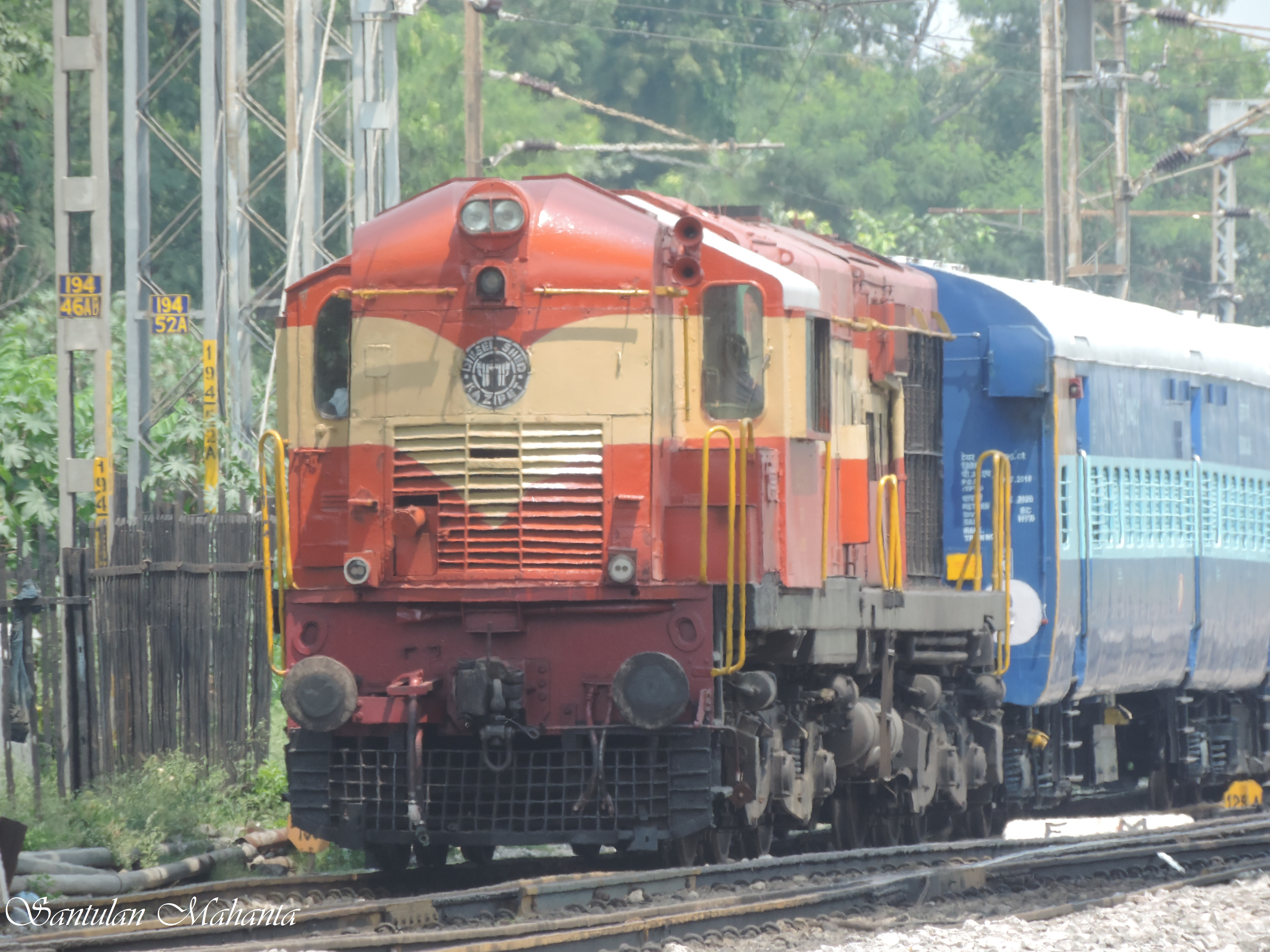
Baldie

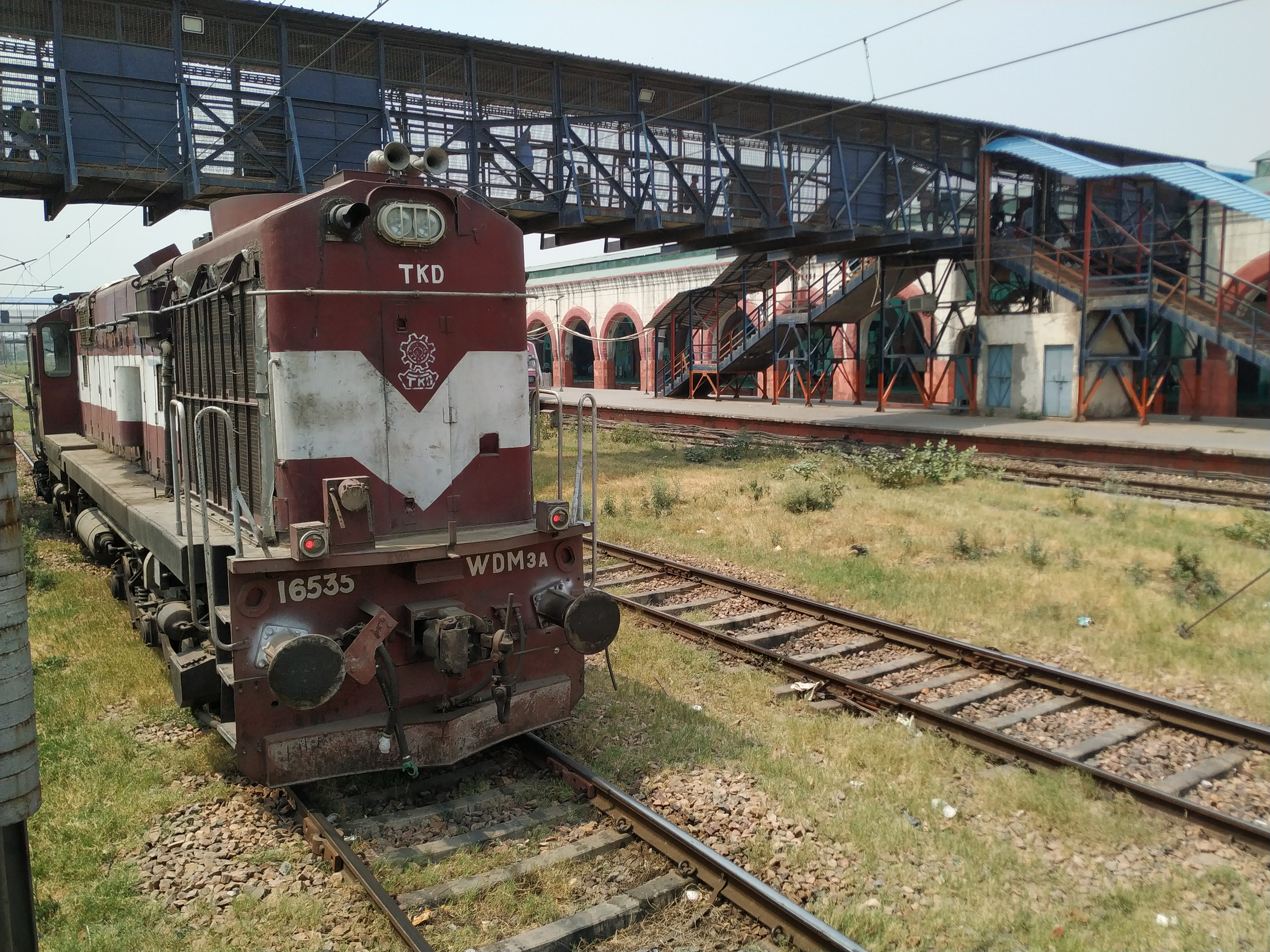
WDM-3A in Ghaziabad Junction.

The first one was delivered on August 22, 1994, it was then WDM-2C. First 57 units produced till March 1996 (Indian Railway road number 14001–14057) had rounded front hood profile similar to contemporary newer classes of locos built by DLW (WDG-3A and WDP-1).

After that there was a gap of long four years in the WDM-3A production line in BLW. These units have been retro-fitted with dual brakes, in addition to the air and vacuum brakes. The WDM-3A locos have a maximum speed of 120 km/h (75 mph). The gear ratio is 65:18. These new locomotives had their control stand shifted to the left side of the cabin. Meanwhile, Diesel Loco Modernization Works (erstwhile Diesel Modification Works which again was known as Diesel Component Works) in Patiala started rebuilding the existing WDM-2 locomotives, which had reached midlife, with upgraded power-packs. DLMW Patiala re-calibrates the power-pack and upgrades the output power rating to 3100HP. DLW again started building WDM-3A from the year 2000 and continued till the end of 2002 with locomotive road numbers in the range 14058–14143. All the locomotives rebuilt by DLMW and later batch from DLW had regular WDM-2 type square short hood profile and control stand position. DLW again built WDM-3A variant locomotives, during 2005–2006, in the road number range 14144-14167 which were classified as WDM-3B due to their difference in bogie design from classic ALCo asymmetrical trimount to HAHS design which was employed in WDG2 and later WDM-3D classes too. Most of the WDM-B were later converted to WDM-3D.

In 2011, DLMW rebuilt locomotive number 16502 as WDM-3A and equipped it with an Electronic Fuel Injection (EFI) system jointly developed by Engine Research Laboratory of IIT Kanpur, Engine Development Directorate of RDSO, and DLMW Patiala. DLMW continues to rebuild WDM-2 as WDM-3A and recently they have started rebuilding the DLW built WDM-3A too when they reach their midlife. Recent rebuilt locomotives are rated at 3300 HP, and from 2009 onward they are equipped with Daulat Ram DBR, and since 2014 they are also equipped with an Auxiliary Power Unit (APU) in the short hood. Some rebuilt locomotives have Co-Co-fabricated ATHS (Advanced Trimount High Speed) bogies instead of ALCo cast-iron type. All the rebuilt WDM-3A bear the "-R" suffix to their road numbers.

In 2012 Bangladesh Railway ordered 26 WDM-3A from DLW. They are classified as Class 6500 there. These units, however, lack the dynamic braking which happens to be an essential component in their Indian counterparts.

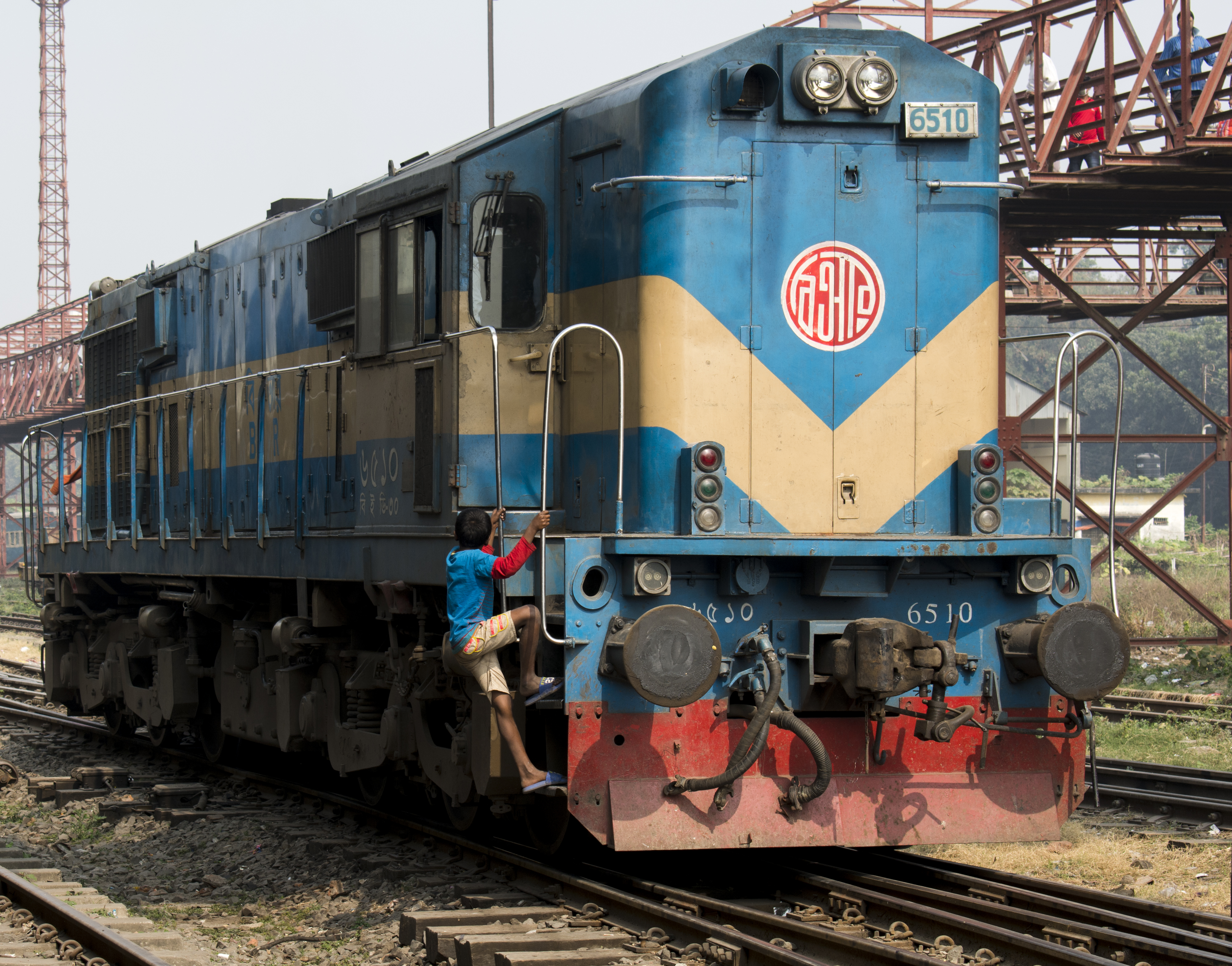
Bangladeshi Counterpart of WDM-3A

== Sub-classes ==
=== WDM-3C ===
The WDM-3C were just upgraded and more powerful WDM-3As with the ALCO engine gain rebuilt to output 3300 hp. It was the first follow-up experiment after the WDM-3A to squeeze more power out of the ALCO engine, an intermediary that would later lead to the development of the WDM-3D. Not many were produced, all of which were rebuilds of the WDM-2 or WDM-3A and were identical to the previous variants in every aspect. They can no longer be found over the railway network as all of them have been rebuilt into the WDM-3A or WDM-2 type.

== Locomotive sheds ==
Zone	Name	Shed code	Quantity
Central Railway	Pune	PADX	1
Eastern Railway	Howrah	HWHD	15
Northern Railway	Tughlakabad	TKDD	16
Northern Railway	Ludhiana	LDHD	29
Northern Railway	Lucknow	AMVD	10
North Eastern Railway	Izzatnagar	IZND	7
Southern Railway	Ernakulam	ERSX	5
Southern Railway	Tondiarpet	TNPD	14
South Western Railway	Krishnarajapuram	KJMD	7
West Central Railway	Itarsi	ETD	11
Total locomotives active as of September 2026			116

== Technical specifications ==
Technical details are as follows:

Manufacturers	DLW, DLMW (DMW/DCW)
Engine	Alco 251-C, 16 cylinder, 3,300 hp (2,500 kW), earlier 3,100 hp (2,300 kW) (3,007 hp or 2,242 kW site rating, earlier 2,900 hp (2,200 kW)) with Napier NA2951R/ ABB VTC-304-VG15/ GE 7s 1716 turbo supercharged engine. 1,050 rpm max, 400 rpm idle; 228.6 mm × 266.7 mm (9.00 in × 10.50 in) bore x stroke; compression ratio 12.5:1. Direct fuel injection, centrifugal pump cooling system (2,457 L/min (540 imp gal/min; 649 US gal/min) at 1,050 rpm), fan driven by eddy current clutch (90 hp or 67 kW at 1,050 rpm)
Governor	EDC / Woodward 8574-650
Transmission	Electric, with BHEL TA 10102 CW alternator (1,050 rpm, 1100 V, 4,400 amperes) (Earlier used BHEL TG 10931 AZ alternator)
Traction motors	BHEL TM 4906 AZ/ 4907 BZ (435 hp or 324 kW) (with roller bearings)
Axle load	18.8 tonnes (18.5 long tons; 20.7 short tons), total weight 112.8 t (111.0 long tons; 124.3 short tons)
Bogies	Alco design cast frame asymmetric trimount (Co-Co) bogies
Starting TE	30.45 t (29.97 long tons; 33.57 short tons) at adhesion 27%, continuous 28.05 t (27.61 long tons; 30.92 short tons)
Length over buffer beams	15,862 mm (52 ft 1/2 in)
Distance between bogies	10,516 mm (34 ft 6 in)

== See also ==
- Indian locomotive class WDM-2
- Indian Railways
- List of diesel locomotives of India
- Rail transport in India
