= Naogaon University =

Public university in Bangladesh

- নওগাঁ বিশ্ববিদ্যালয়
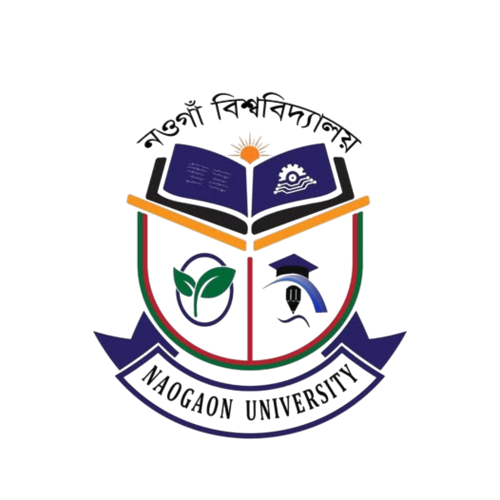
- Monogram of Naogaon University
- Other name: NaU
- Type: Public
- Established: 2023 (3 years ago)
- Affiliations: University Grants Commission (UGC)
- Chancellor: President Mirza Fakhrul Islam Alamgir
- Vice-Chancellor: Dr Md Hasanath Ali
- Location: Naogaon District, Rajshahi, Bangladesh
- Campus: 100 acres (40 ha); Urban
- Language: English, Bengali
- Website: nau.ac.bd

Naogaon University is a public university of Bangladesh, established in 2023 as the country’s 54th public university, located in Naogaon—one of the major districts of northern Bangladesh. With the aim of fulfilling the long-standing aspirations of the conscious people of Naogaon, the university was founded to keep pace with and attain parity with the rapidly advancing global higher education landscape, and to create and expand opportunities for higher education and research at the national level, particularly in the practice of modern knowledge across diverse fields.

In 2023, the Government Gazette was published under the title “Bangabandhu Sheikh Mujibur Rahman University, Naogaon Act–2023”, which was later amended and republished as the “Naogaon University, Naogaon Act–2023”. Based on this legal framework, Naogaon University was formally established. The inception of the university has opened a new horizon for higher education in the region and fulfilled the long-cherished dream of a vast population of education-seeking people.

== History ==
Naogaon district is an inseparable part of the ancient Barind (Varendra) region, with roots in education and culture deeply embedded in millennia-old traditions. In this historic land, Paharpur Mahavihara (Somapura Mahavihara)—established in the 8th century by the Pala king Dharmapala—was one of the world’s most renowned centers of learning. Scholars and students from distant regions such as Tibet, China, and Southeast Asia traveled there in pursuit of knowledge.

Following the decline of that golden era, Naogaon remained without a full-fledged institution of higher education or a university for more than twelve centuries. After the destruction of the Mahavihara, the region experienced a prolonged institutional vacuum in higher education. Although institutions such as Naogaon K.D. Government High School and Naogaon Government College have maintained excellence at the secondary and higher secondary levels in modern times, the absence of an autonomous institution at the undergraduate and postgraduate levels compelled many talented students to migrate to Rajshahi or the capital city, Dhaka.

However, a state commitment made in 2018 to establish a public university in the region marked the beginning of the end of this twelve-hundred-year gap and ushered in a new chapter in the modern educational map of Naogaon.

Four years later, in 2022, official processes for establishing Naogaon University gained momentum. In February 2022, the Cabinet approved the draft of a university act in the name of Bangabandhu for Naogaon, paving the way to resolve administrative complexities. In 2023, a bill titled “Bangabandhu Sheikh Mujibur Rahman University, Naogaon Act–2023” was presented in the National Parliament. Following thorough scrutiny by the Parliamentary Standing Committee on the Ministry of Education, the bill was unanimously passed and was promulgated as law through a government gazette on 13 February 2023, officially designated as “Act No. 9 of 2023”.

In July 2024, the fall of the authoritarian Sheikh Hasina government through a mass uprising of students and citizens brought about profound changes in Bangladesh’s national, political, and socio-economic landscape. As a result, under the supervision of the Interim Government of Bangladesh in 2025, the “Bangabandhu Sheikh Mujibur Rahman University, Naogaon Act–2023” was amended and transformed into the “Naogaon University Act–2023.” In response to the demands of anti-discrimination student movements, the Interim Government removed Bangabandhu’s name from the university, officially renaming it “Naogaon University”.

Following the completion of legal formalities, on 8 June 2023, Professor Dr. Abul Kalam Azad of the Department of Applied Chemistry and Chemical Engineering, University of Rajshahi, was appointed as the first Vice-Chancellor for a four-year term. Under his leadership, administrative operations commenced with a preliminary team of 12 officers and staff in a rented building located in the Baludanga area of Naogaon town.

Subsequently, on 6 October 2024, Professor Dr. Md. Hasanat Ali of the Institute of Business Administration (IBA), University of Rajshahi, was appointed as the new Vice-Chancellor of Naogaon University for a four-year tenure, a position he currently holds.

Most recently, the University Grants Commission (UGC) of Bangladesh has granted approval for the commencement of formal academic activities from the 2025–26 academic session. This approval marks a significant milestone in the university’s journey and opens a new horizon of education, development, and potential. The UGC has approved the opening of two departments under two faculties: the Department of Law under the Faculty of Law, and the Department of Accounting under the Faculty of Business Studies. With these two departments, Naogaon University officially began its academic journey in the 2025–26 academic year.

== Campus ==
As Naogaon University currently lacks a permanent campus, all administrative and official activities are being conducted on a temporary basis from a rented building located in the Model Town residential area adjacent to Baludanga Bus Stand in Naogaon town. The academic activities commencing from the 2025–26 academic session—initially admitting students into the Law and Accounting (ACC) departments—will also be conducted at this temporary campus.

Notable progress has, however, been made toward establishing a permanent campus. Land selection has advanced significantly, with a decision taken to establish the permanent campus in the Shaluka, Chakrampur, and Pathuria mouzas of Naogaon Sadar Upazila. The proposed site is located close to Naogaon Municipality, and administrative approval has been granted for the acquisition of approximately 97 acres of land. Upon completion of the land acquisition process and allocation of the necessary budget, construction of permanent infrastructure and buildings will commence expeditiously.

=== Infrastructure ===
Naogaon University is fully prepared to commence its academic activities in the 2025–26 academic year. The university administration is working tirelessly to ensure a modern education system and a research-oriented academic environment. Despite operating from a temporary campus, adequate modern facilities have been ensured for students at the current stage.

At the primary level, the facilities include:

- Smart Classrooms: Modern, student-friendly classrooms equipped with multimedia projectors.
- Well-Resourced Library: A library containing up-to-date academic textbooks, reference materials, and digital resources.
- Computer Laboratory: A state-of-the-art lab equipped with 40 modern computers and high-speed internet to support technological education.

Additionally, with the objective of ensuring quality higher education, future plans include the establishment of science and technology research centers, smart laboratories, and opportunities for collaboration with international partners.

== Faculties and Departments ==
=== Faculty of Business Studies ===
- Department of Accounting (ACC)

=== Faculty of Law ===
- Department of Law (LAW)

== Vice-Chancellors ==
List of Vice-Chancellors of Naogaon University:
| Sequence | Name | Took over | Transferred the duty |
|---|---|---|---|
| 1 | Professor Dr Abul Kalam Azad | 8-6-2023 | 6-10-2024 |
| 2 | Professor Dr Md Hasanath Ali | 6-10-2024 | Present |

== Gallery ==
Naogaon University

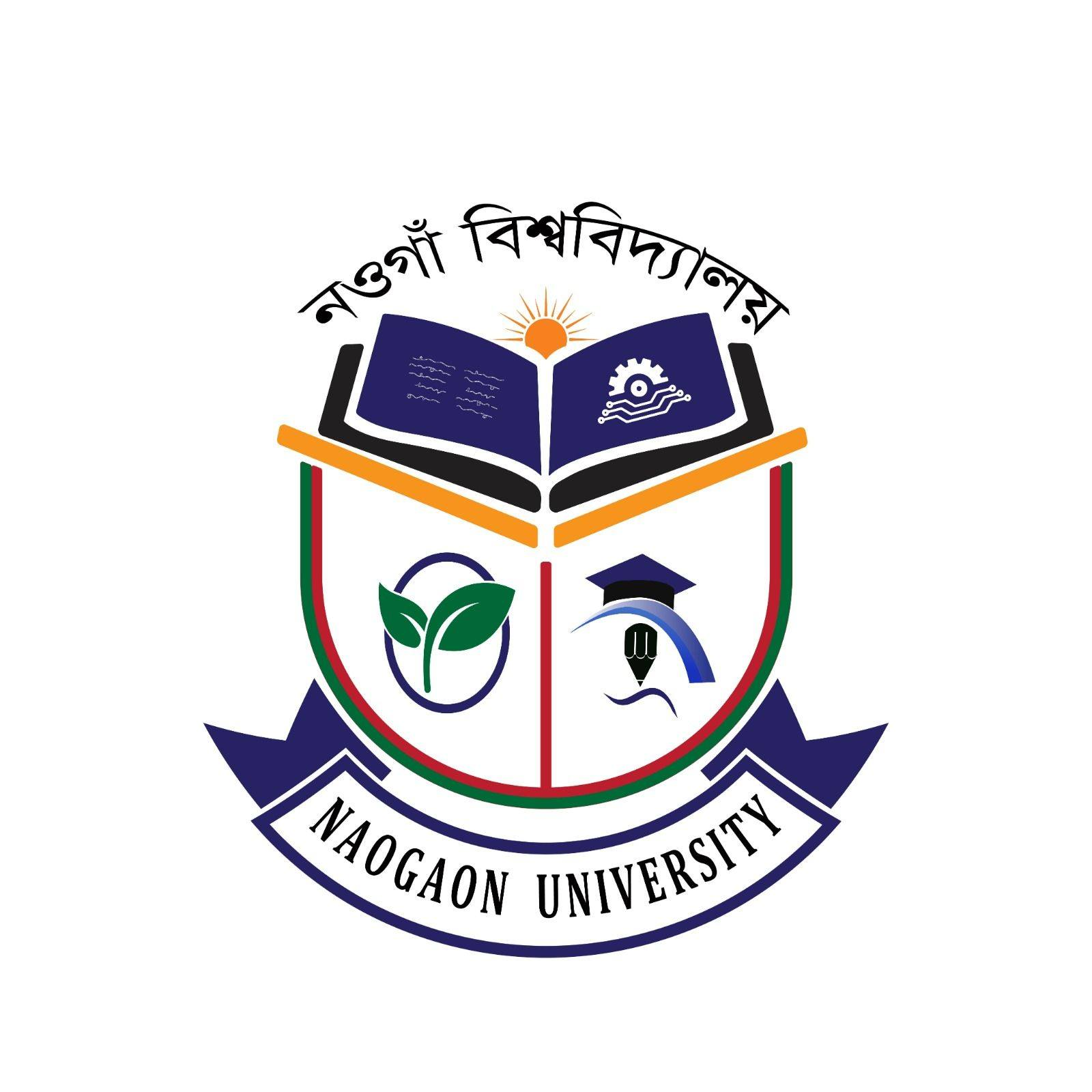
Official Monogram
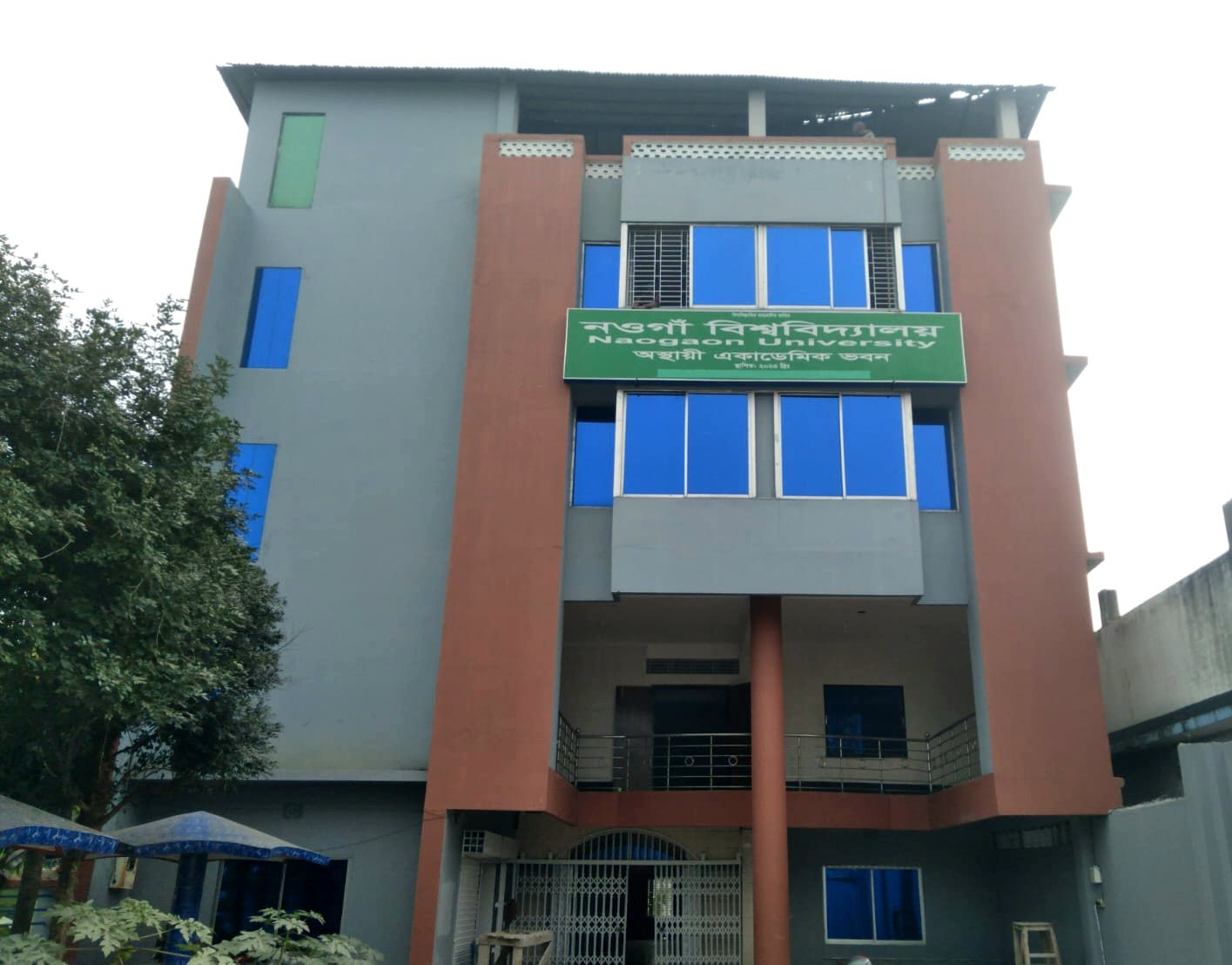
Academic Building (impermanent)
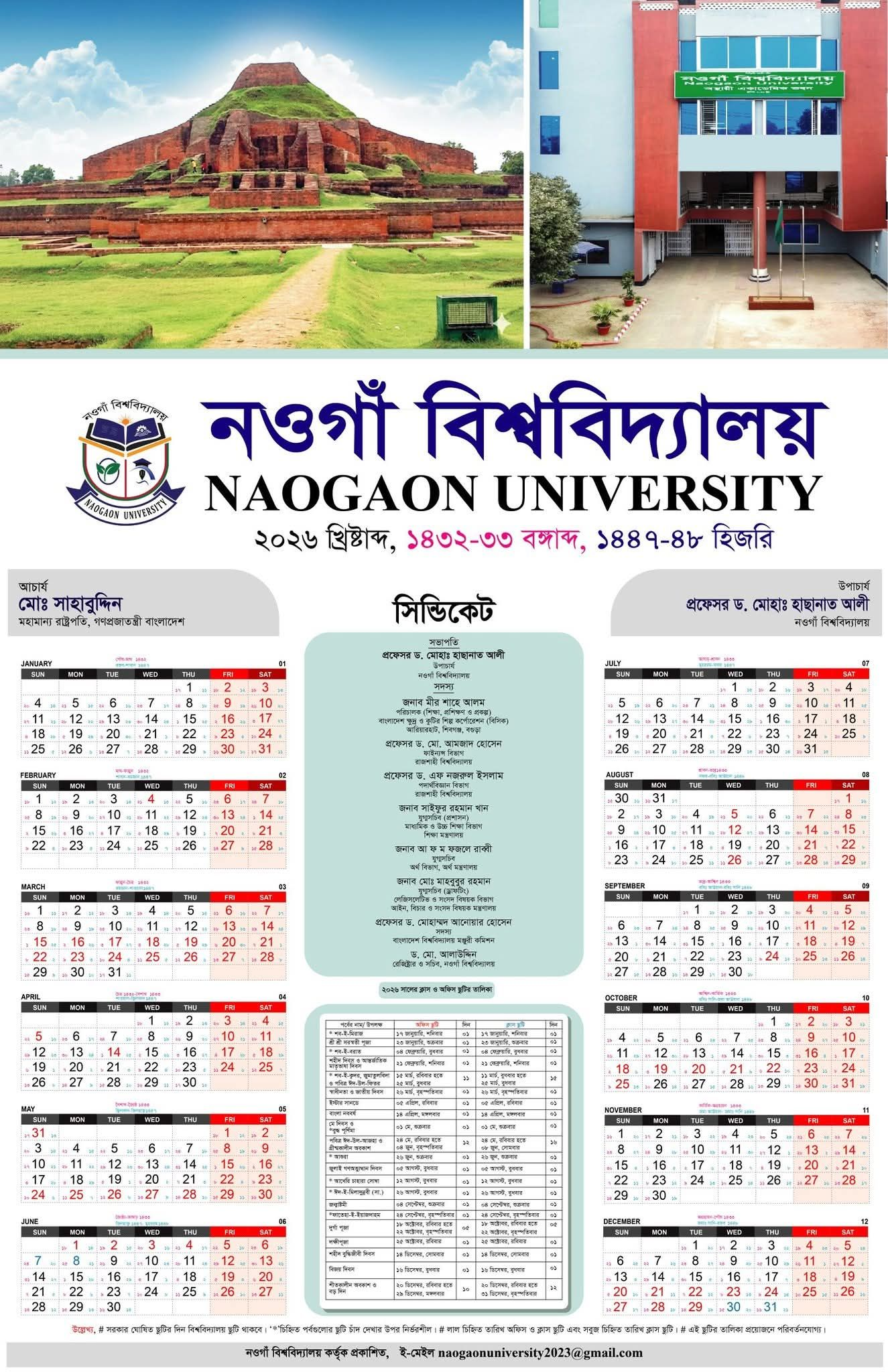
Calendar - 2026

== See also ==
- Universities in Bangladesh
- List of universities in Bangladesh
