= Tilna Multilateral High School =

Tilna ML High School
- তিলনা বহুমুখী উচ্চ বিদ্যালয়

Location
- Main Road, Tilna, Sapahar, Naogaon District; 6530; Bangladesh
- Coordinates: 25.0413°N 88.5980°E

Information
- Type: Private secondary school
- Established: 1943
- School board: Rajshahi Education Board
- Headmaster: Md. Nazrul Islam
- Grades: 1–12
- Gender: Combined
- Enrollment: 350
- Campus: Rural
- Colors: White and Grey
- Sports: Cricket, football, volleyball

Tilna ML High School (Bengali: তিলনা বহুমুখী উচ্চ বিদ্যালয়), established in 1943, is situated in Tilna, Sapahar Upazila, Naogaon District, Bangladesh.

== See also ==
- Sapahar Government College
- Sapahar Pilot High School, Naogaon
