= Shekerpur Union, Naogaon Sadar =

Shikarpur শিকারপুর
- Union
- Location in Bangladesh
- Coordinates: 24°48.3′N 88°57′E
- Country: Bangladesh
- Division: Rajshahi Division
- District: Naogaon District
- Time zone: UTC+6 (BST)
- Website: Shekerpur Union

Shikarpur Union is a union in the Naogaon Sadar upazila of Naogaon district in the Rajshahi division of Bangladesh.
