= Sapahar Government College =

Sapahar Govt. College
- সাপাহার সরকারি কলেজ
- Motto in English: Knowledge is power
- Type: Public
- Established: 1973
- Affiliations: National University, Bangladesh
- Chancellor: Abdul Hamid
- Principal: Professor Md. Nazir uddin
- Academic staff: 28
- Administrative staff: 34
- Students: 4,000
- Location: Sapahar, Naogaon, Rajshahi, Bangladesh; 25.13062°N 88.55295°E
- Campus: Urban
- Colors: White and Black (Male); White and Ash grey (Female)
- Website: www.sapgc.gov.bd

Sapahar Government College (Bengali: সাপাহার সরকারি কলেজ) is a public educational institution based in Sapahar Upazila, Naogaon District, Bangladesh. It was established in 1973 with 15 students and currently serves about 4,000. It is situated in the northeastern part of Sapahar and authorized by the National University. It's the second largest institution in Naogaon District. Sapahar Government College was nationalized in 1984.

== See also ==
- Al-Helal Islami Academy & College, Sapahar, Naogaon
- Sapahar Pilot High School, Naogaon
