= Agradigun Union =

Agradigun আগ্রাদ্বিগুন
- Union
- Location in Bangladesh
- Country: Bangladesh
- Division: Rajshahi Division
- District: Naogaon District
- Upazila: Dhamoirhat Upazila

Area
  - Total: 24.35 km^{2} (9.40 sq mi)

Population
  - Total: 21,145 Male−11,172; Female−9,973 (Census−2,001)
- Time zone: UTC+6 (BST)
- Postal code: 6540

Agradigun (Bengali: আগ্রাদ্বিগুন) is a union parishad of Dhamoirhat Upazila in the District of Naogaon, Bangladesh. It is situated in the north-western part of the district town Naogaon next to the Indian border. It is around 18 km northern direction from Dhamoirhat Upazila. It has a small bazaar that provides every commodities to its surrounding people. Agradigun Union consists of 34 villages, which are subdivided into 23 mouzas and 5631 khanas. Although it is located in the distant part of the country, Literacy rate of Agradigun Union is more than 65%.

== See also ==
- Shihara Union
- Dhamoirhat Upazila
- Naogaon District
