= Monzur Hossain =

Bangladeshi physician

- Born: 1928
- Died: 1968 (aged 39–40)
- Education: Dhaka Medical College
- Awards: Ekushey Padak (2002)

Monzur Hossain (1928–1968) was a Bangladeshi language activist and physician. He was conferred with Ekushey Padak posthumously in 2002 for his contribution to the Language Movement.

== Biography ==
Hossain was born on 1928 in Naogaon to Mobarok Ali and Nurun Nahar. He completed matriculation from Naogaon K.D. Government High School in 1943. Then, he completed higher secondary studies from Kolkata in 1945. Later, he got admitted into Dhaka Medical College. He received MBBS degree from there.

Hossain took part in the Language Movement. On 4 February 1952 Shorbodolio Kendrio Rashtrobhasha Kormi Porishod called for an all out protest as a part of Language Movement on 21 February. Section 144 was imposed on 20 February 1952 for one month to control the circumstance. Hossain was in favour of breaking section 144. He delivered a speech on rejecting section 144 too.

Hossain was an organizer of the protest rallies on 21 February 1952. He took part in the protest too. He was arrested for this. He also contributed in building the first Shaheed Minar.

After receiving MBBS degree Hossain went to Naogaon and started practicing medicine there. He gave free treatment to the poor. He gave them free medicine too. He also sent patients to Dhaka for better treatment at his cost.

Hossain was involved in journalism too. He became the editor of Weekly Desh Bani in 1960. He was involved in left-wing politics during his student life. He was the president of the Rajshahi district unit of National Awami Party.

Hossain died in 1968. After his death he was conferred with Ekushey Padak posthumously in 2002 for his contribution to the Language Movement.
