= Shihara Union =

Shihara শিহাড়া
- Union
- Location in Bangladesh
- Coordinates: 25°9′N 88°40.8′E
- Country: Bangladesh
- Division: Rajshahi Division
- District: Naogaon District
- Upazila: Patnitala Upazila

Government
  - Chairman: Md. Tofazzul Hossain

Area
  - Total: 37.05 km^{2} (14.31 sq mi)

Population (2011)
  - Total: 24,260
  - Density: 654.8/km^{2} (1,696/sq mi)
- Time zone: UTC+6 (BST)
- Postal code: 6561
- Website: 11noshiharaup.naogaon.gov.bd

Shihara (Bengali: শিহাড়া) is a Union Parishad of Patnitala Upazila in Naogaon District in the Division of Rajshahi, Bangladesh.

== Administration ==
The Administrative Council of the Union consists of three women Members of the reserved women's seat and nine General Members under one chairman.

== Economy ==
Most of the people of this union depend on agriculture. Previously paddy was the main crop of this area. But the farmers faced financial loss in paddy cultivation so they started cultivating mango. Mango is currently the main crop in the region. Many types of mango like Amrapali, Bari-4, Langra, Fazli, Ashwina, Khirsapati etc. are cultivated in about 80% of the land. Farmers are now benefited by cultivating mango.

== See also ==
- Patnitala Upazila
- Naogaon District
- Agradigun Union
- Unions of Bangladesh
