= Patari (disambiguation) =

Patari is a scheduled tribe in Uttar Pradesh, India.

Patari may also refer to:

- Patari (service), music streaming service in Pakistan
- Patari Union, a union council of Bangladesh

== See also ==
- Pataria Jain temples, Jain temples in Vidisha, India
