= Tetulia B. M. C. College =

Location
- Tetulia, Barshail, Naogaon; Bangladesh
- Coordinates: 24.9079°N 88.8854°E

Information
- Type: Private higher secondary school
- Motto: Knowledge is Power
- Established: 2000
- School board: Board of Intermediate and Secondary Education, Rajshahi
- Principal: Mr Siddiquir Rahman (2000–Present)
- Faculty: 15
- Grades: 11 to 12
- Gender: Boys and girls
- Age range: 16–20
- Enrollment: 350
- Language: Bengali
- Campus size: 2 acres (0.8 ha)

Tetulia B. M. C. College is a private higher secondary school in Tetulia, Naogaon Sadar Upazila, Bangladesh. It is affiliated with Rajshahi Education Board.
