= Ganja Society =

Co-operative Society of British Bengal established for the development of Cannabis

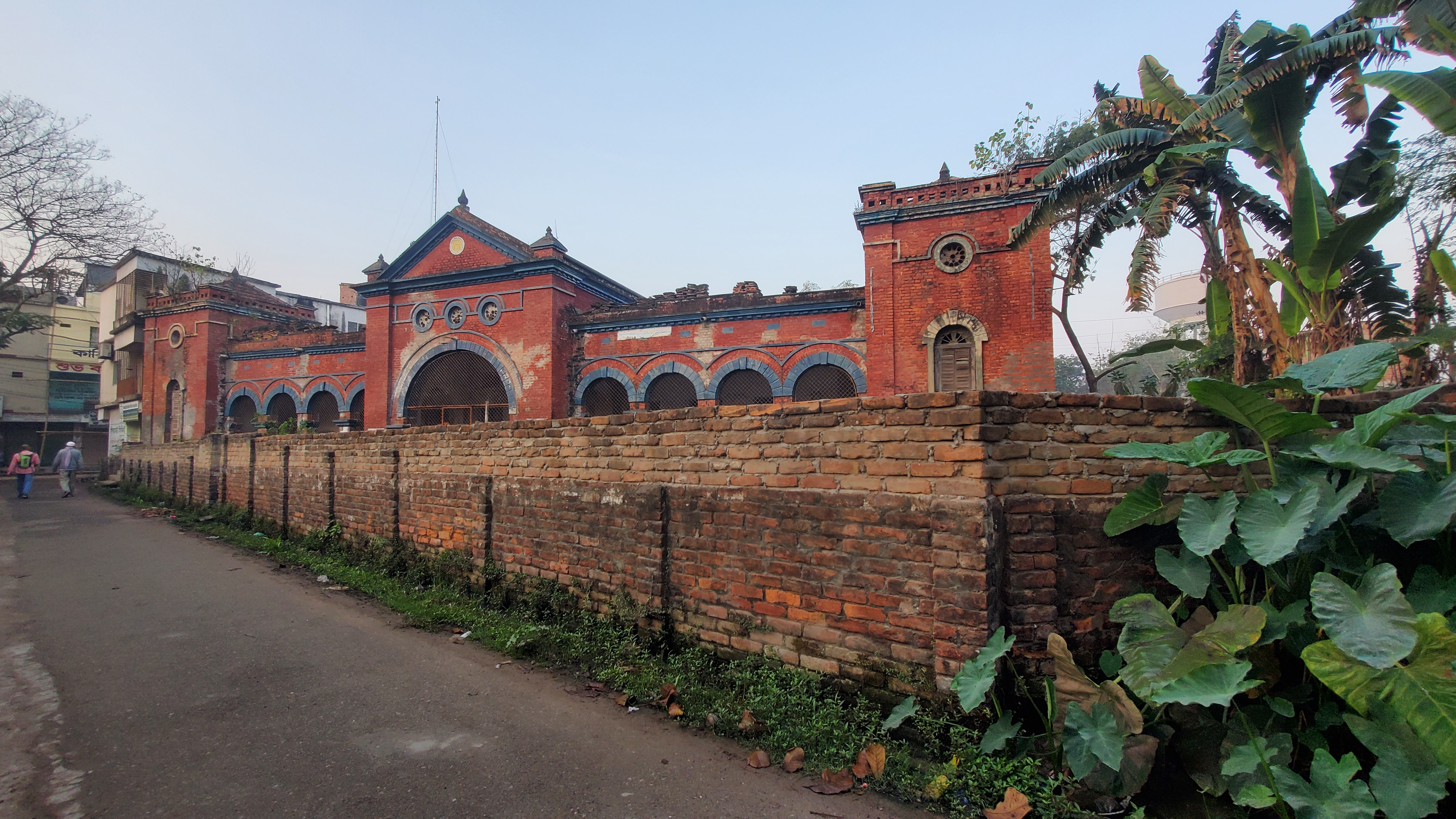
- Headquarters of Ganja Society
- Company type: Co-operative
- Industry: Agriculture
- Founded: 1917
- Founder: British Raj
- Headquarters: Naogaon, Bangladesh
- Area served: Bengal (now Bangladesh and West Bengal)
- Key people: Milton Chandra Roy (president of ad-hoc committee)
- Products: Cannabis
- Total assets: est. ৳100 crores

Naogaon Ganja Cultivators' Co-operative Society Limited (Bengali: নওগাঁ গাঁজা চাষি সমবায় সমিতি লিমিটেড) or commonly Ganja Society (Bengali: গাঁজা সোসাইটি) is a co-operative society that was established by the British Raj in 1917. This cooperative society was established for the development of cannabis cultivation and the well-being of growers in Naogaon, British-ruled Bengal.

== History ==
According to legend, seeds of cannabis were brought to Naogaon District for cultivation from Jessore District before 1857 and were first planted. However, according to history, after the establishment of a cannabis hub in Naogaon, Bengal Presidency in 1906, the government of the British Raj started the first commercial cultivation of cannabis in the region Bengal. The government then appointed a registrar to collect revenue from the hub. In 1917, a cooperative society named the Ganja Society was established for the welfare of the 7,000 cannabis growers of Naogaon. The shares of the co-operative society were then sold to the farmers at the rate of ten rupees each, whereby the farmers became its partners. A warehouse was built there to store the produced cannabis. It was inaugurated in 1921 by Syed Nawab Ali Chowdhury, one of the provincial ministers of Bengal. In 1974, the government of Bangladesh signed the Geneva Conventions, which forced the government to withdraw from cannabis production. In 1975, the Ganja Society set up a 1,000 metric ton capacity cold storage facility with three chambers. According to the agreement, the activities of the Ganja Society came to a standstill in 1987 when the cultivation of cannabis was banned. After the ban was announced, the government locked up the Ganja Society's warehouses with manufactured cannabis.

== Assets ==
According to 2013 accounts, Ganja Society had 40 acres of immovable property. It has properties in various places in Naogaon. In the past it had properties in different parts of Bengal. It still has an account with Bengal Cooperative Bank. Four warehouses under it are currently owned by the Department of Narcotics Control. After the prohibition of cannabis production, its cold storage was leased, which was used to store potatoes. However, due to the COVID-19 pandemic, it could not be leased out again. According to Banglanews24.com, the Ganja Society still has properties worth at least ৳100 crore in Naogaon.

== Issues ==
The Ganja Society used to form committees on the basis of elections in whose management allowances were paid to its members by the Society. Besides this means several hospitals and schools were run by its fund. But after a member filed a court writ against the 2006 elections, the Ganja Society's responsibilities came under an interim committee, and these activities stopped. Also, after the government appointed the cooperative officer of Naogaon Sadar Upazila as the executive officer of the Ganja Society, there were allegations of misappropriation of its funds. According to a section of its partners, the employees of Ganja Society, political figures and unscrupulous groups have illegally grabbed and sold its properties.
