= Nazrul Academy =

Research institute in Bangladesh

- নজরুল একাডেমি
- Formation: 24 May 1968; 58 years ago
- Founder: Talim Hossain
- Type: Non-governmental organization
- Headquarters: Nazrul Bhaban
- Location: Maghbazar, Dhaka, Bangladesh
- Coordinates: 23.7475°N 90.4028°E
- General secretary: Mintu Rahman
- Website: nazrulacademybd.org

Nazrul Academy is an academic research institution devoted to the study of the national poet of Bangladesh, Kazi Nazrul Islam, and his works including Nazrul Geeti. The academy is located in Maghbazar, Dhaka, Bangladesh.

== History ==
Nazrul Academy was established by the poet Talim Hossain on 24 May 1968 in Dhaka in the then East Pakistan. Justice Abu Sayeed Chowdhury, the future president of Bangladesh, was the first chairman of the academy.

== Functions and activities ==
=== Nazrul Academy Award ===
- Sohrab Hossain (1982)
- Abdul Alim (1996)
- Begum Uma Kazi and Nilufar Yasmin (2003)
- Shahabuddin Ahmed and Mintu Rahman (2005)
- Rafiqul Islam and Abdul Mannan Syed (2006)
- Khalid Hossain and Asadul Haq (2007)
- A H Saidur Rahman and Askar Ibne Shaikh (2008)
- Mohammad Abdul Qayyum and Rawshan Ara Mustafiz (2009)
- Mustafa Zaman Abbasi (2012)
- M.A. Mannan (2014)
- Syed Abdul Hadi (2016)
- Begum Jamila Alim (2019)

== Notable alumni ==
- Dilshad Nahar Kona
- Rafiqul Islam
