= Mahe Nao =

Pakistani literary magazine

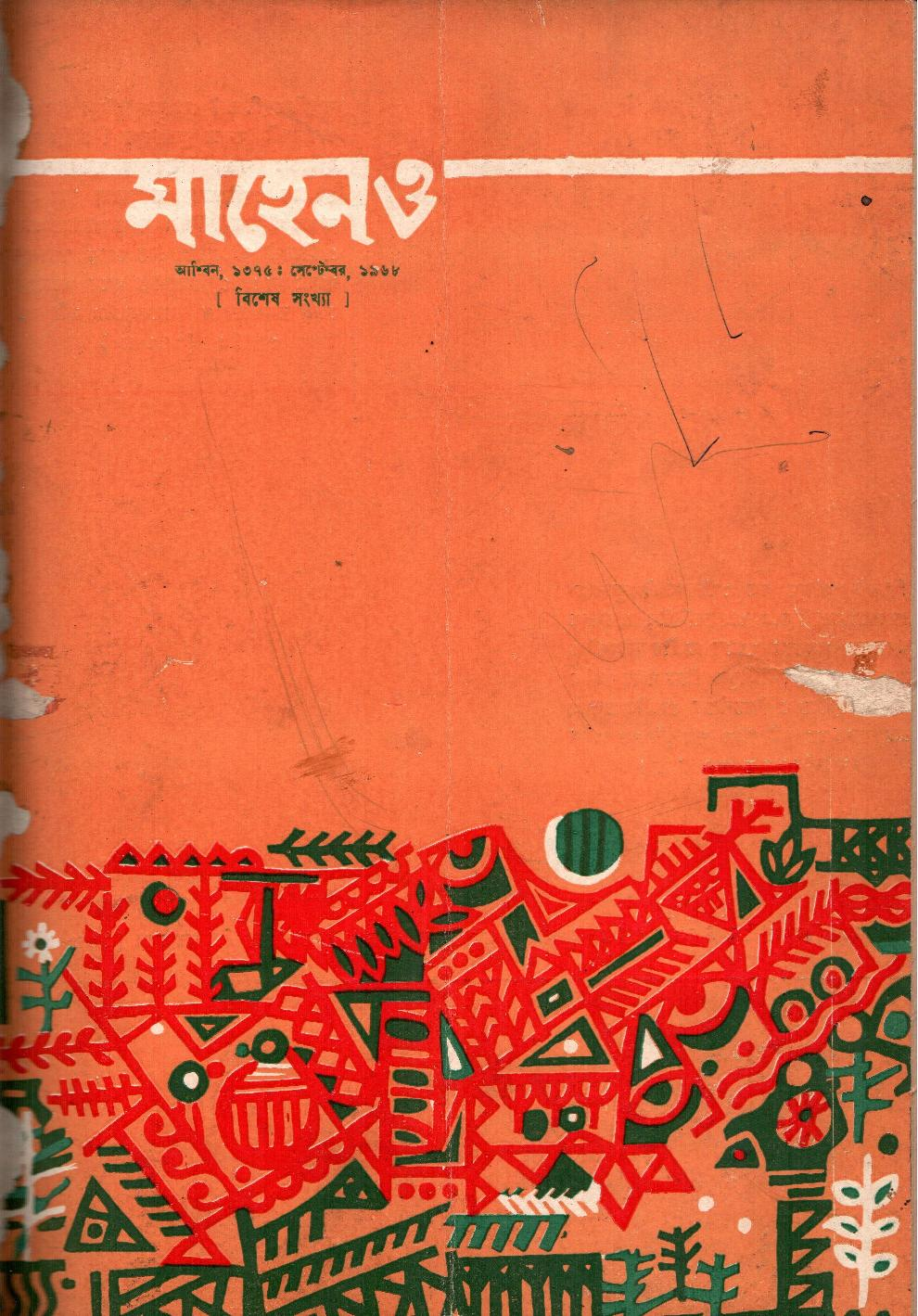
- Cover of Mahe Nao
- Editor: Abdur Rashid (first editor)
- Frequency: Monthly
- Founder: Department of Publications of the Government of Pakistan
- Founded: April 1949
- Final issue: November 1971
- Country: Pakistan
- Based in: Karachi, Dhaka
- Language: Bengali

Mahe Nao was a monthly literary magazine published by the Department of Publications of the Government of Pakistan.

== History ==
The magazine was founded in April 1949 by the Department of Publications of the Government of Pakistan. The first five issues were published in Karachi but starting from the sixth they were published in Dhaka. The magazine was pro-Pakistan with a nationalistic editorial stand that called for united between East and West Pakistan. The magazine was published in Bengali language but it used loan words from Arabic, Persian, Turkish, and Urdu languages that was different from Standard Bengali. The founding editor was Abdur Rashid. After him the magazine was subsequently edited by Abdul Quadir, Mizanur Rahman, Muhammad Mansuruddin, and Talim Hossain. The magazine published the writings of notable Bengali writers in East Pakistan. It stopped publication in November 1971 during the Bangladesh Liberation war and did not resume after the independence of Bangladesh.
