= Patari Union =

Local government unit in Bangladesh

Coordinates: 25°11′N 88°27′E

Patari (Bengali: পাতাড়ী) is a union parishad under Sapahar Upazila, Naogaon District, Bangladesh. It is bound by West Bengal of India on the north and west, Goala Union on the south, and Aihai Union on the east. The main river is Punarbhaba River.

== Demographics ==
According to the 2011 Bangladesh census, Patari Union had 5,240 households and a population of 25,328. The literacy rate (age 7 and over) was 30.8%, compared to the national average of 51.8%.

== Economy ==
Most of the people of the Patari Union depend on agriculture. The employment breakdown is agriculture 48.15%, agricultural labourer 23.58%, wage labourer 3.07%, commerce 8.14%, service 5.49%, others 9.57%. The main crops are paddy, wheat, mustard seed, mango, jack fruit, banana etc.

Single crop 49%, double crop 39% and treble crop land 12%. Among peasants, 24% are landless, 25% smallholders, 30% medium and 21% are rich.

== Education ==
Kalmudanga High School And Kalmudanga Girls High School is the secondary school in the union. According to Banglapedia, Pathari Fazil Madrasa, founded in 1961, is a notable fazil madrasa.
