= Mithapur B. L. High School =

Coordinates: 24°59′26″N 88°59′07″E

Information
- Established: 1941; 84 years ago

Mithapur B. L. High School is a secondary school located in Mithapur, Badalgachhi Upazila, Naogaon, Bangladesh. It was founded in 1941.
