= Naogaon K.D. Government High School =

- নওগাঁ কে.ডি. সরকারি উচ্চ বিদ্যালয়

Location
- Kachari Road, Naogaon; Bangladesh; 24°48′47″N 88°56′38″E

Information
- Type: Public school
- Motto: শিক্ষার জন্য এসো, সেবার জন্য বেরিয়ে যাও (Come for education, go out to serve)
- Established: 1884
- Founder: Babu Krishnadhan
- School board: Rajshahi Education Board
- Principal: Md. Abu Taher
- Faculty: 50
- Grades: 3–10
- Gender: Boys
- Enrollment: 2000
- Language: Bengali
- Campus size: 4.94 acres (2.00 ha)
- Campus type: Urban
- Colors: White and Navy Blue
- Website: www.nkdghs.edu.bd

Naogaon K.D. Government High School (Bengali: নওগাঁ কে.ডি. সরকারি উচ্চ বিদ্যালয়) is a public secondary school in Naogaon, Bangladesh. It was established in 1884.

== History ==
Krishnadhan High School was established in 1884 by Babu Krishnadhan, the deputy collector of Naogaon and supervisor of the Ganja Society. The school was housed at first in a hay barn south of the present school building. Later, as a higher English school, it was known as Naogaon K. D. H. E. High School.

Funds raised in connection with the coronation of Emperor George V in 1911 helped construct a single-storey "H"-shaped brick school building.

The police took over the school's two-storied hostel in 1956, creating a severe shortage of student accommodation. In 1969, the school's managing committee donated the hostel, still occupied by the police, to a proposed girls' college. Meanwhile, the auditorium was built in 1961 with a government grant.

The school was provincialised in March 1970, becoming Naogaon K. D. Government High School. On 24 February 1984, the school had celebrated 100th anniversary. There is a memorial stone to commemorate this memory.

== Notable people ==
- Mafizuddin Ahmed, elected to the Provincial Assembly of East Pakistan in 1954 and 1962, was secretary of Naogaon K. D. H. E. School.

=== Alumni ===
- Monzur Hossain, recipient of the Ekushey Padak, matriculated in 1943.
- AKM Nurul Islam, botanist, matriculated in 1945.
- Abdul Jalil, government minister, matriculated in 1957.
- Humayun Kabir, Indian educationist and politician, matriculated in 1922.
- Sadhan Chandra Majumder, food minister from 2019 to 2024, completed his Secondary School Certificate.

== Gallery ==
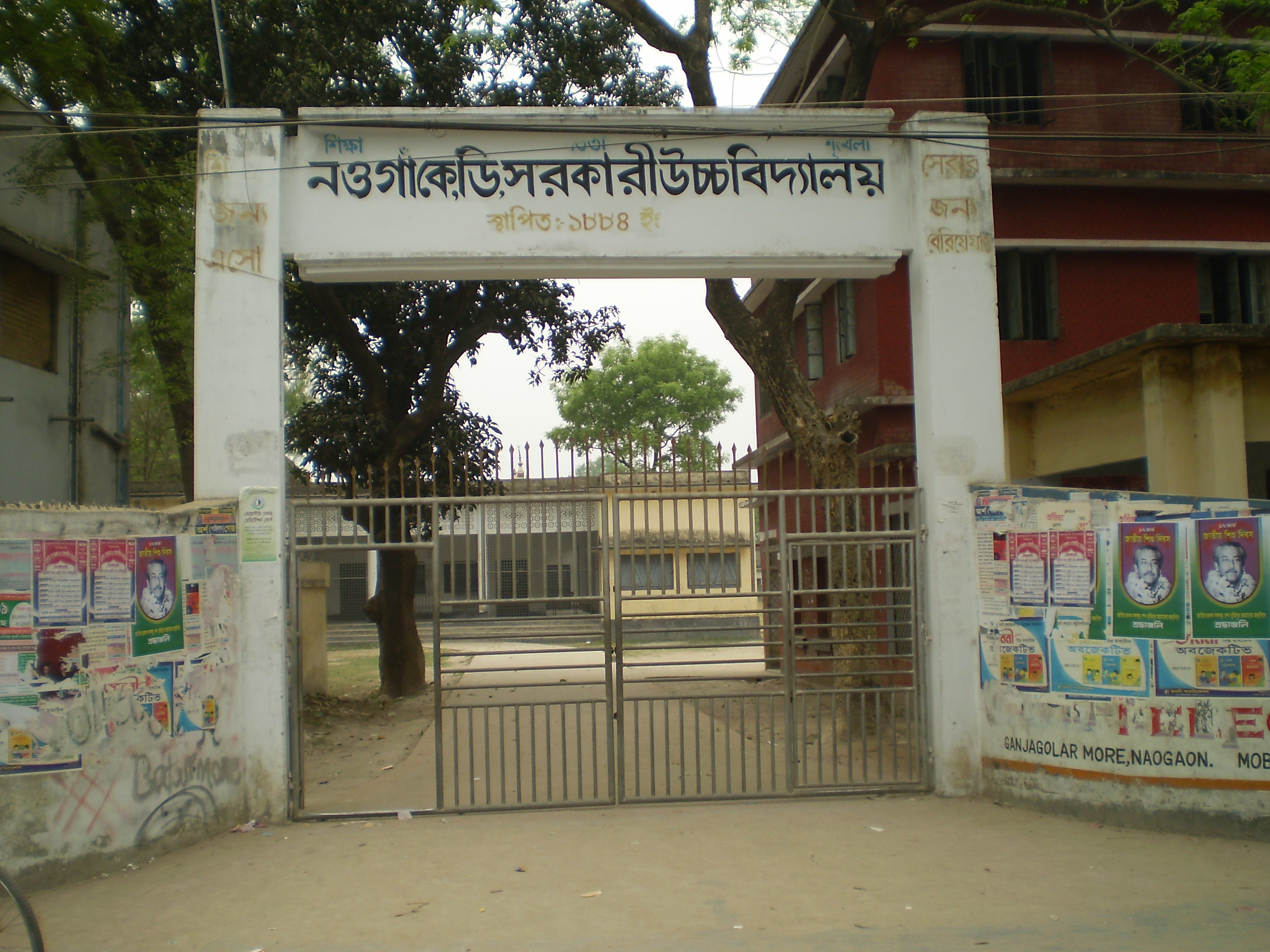
Main gate of Naogaon K.D. Government High School.

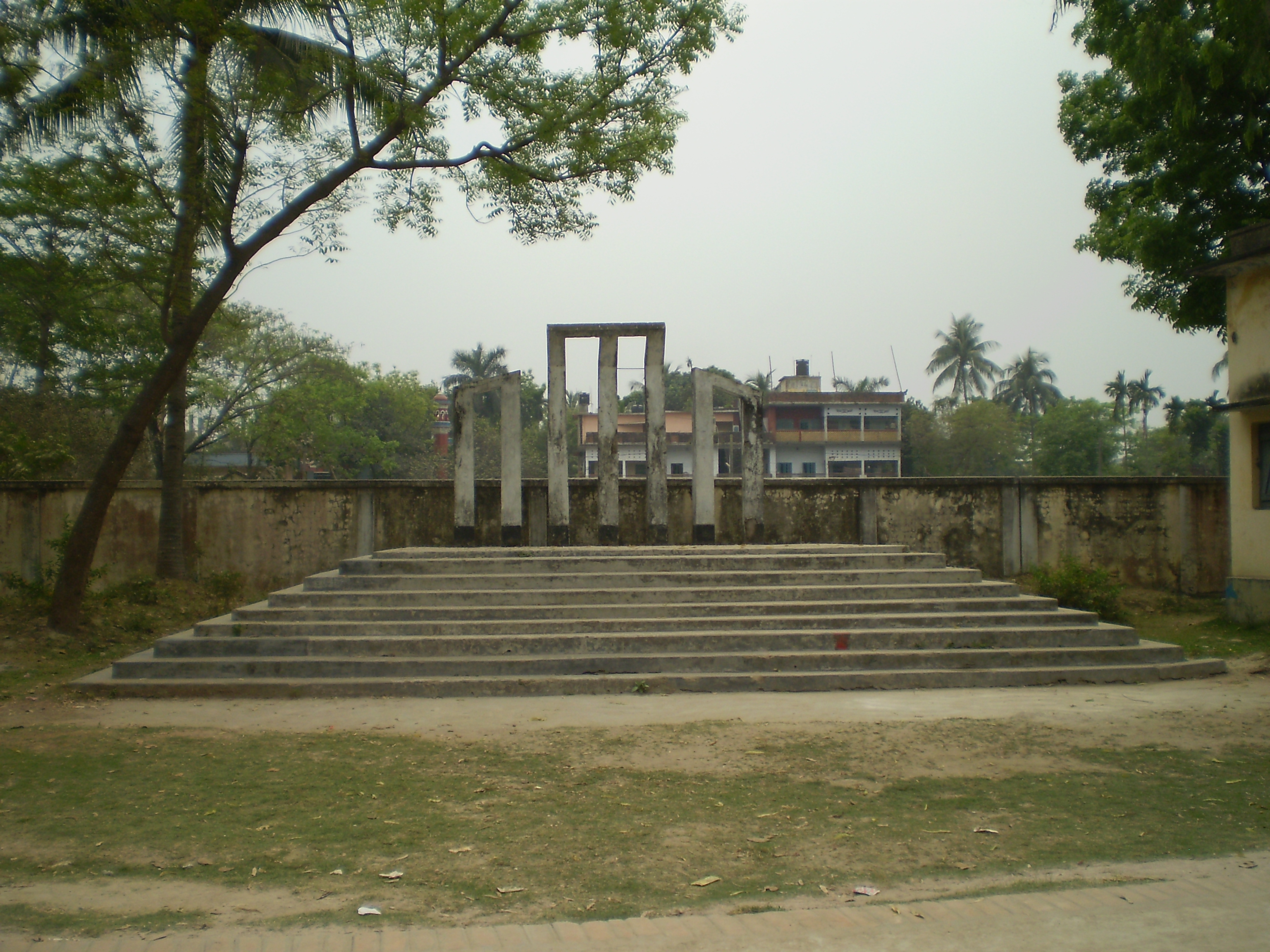
Shaheed Minar at the school campus.

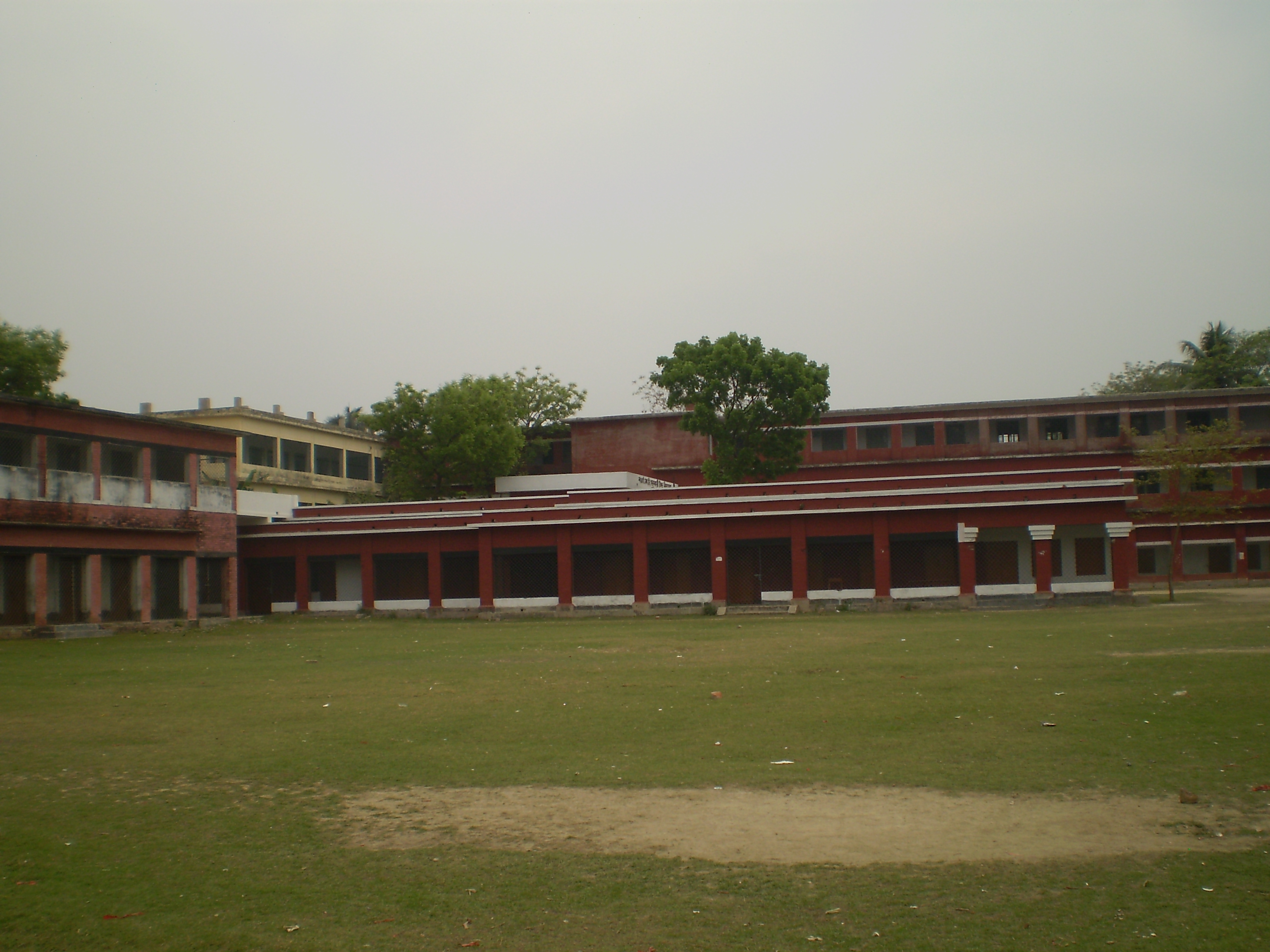
Academic building of the school and the school field.

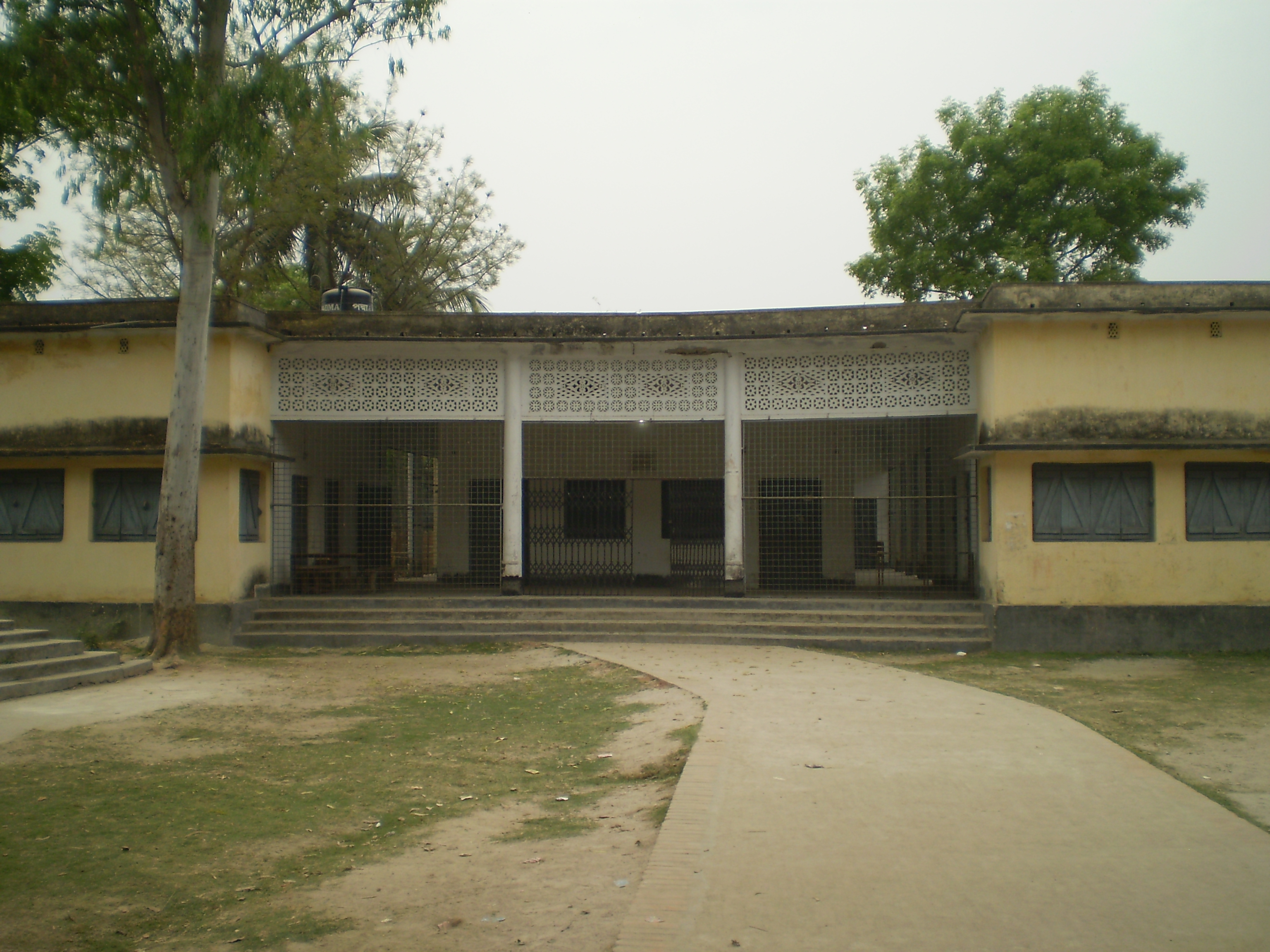
School auditorium.

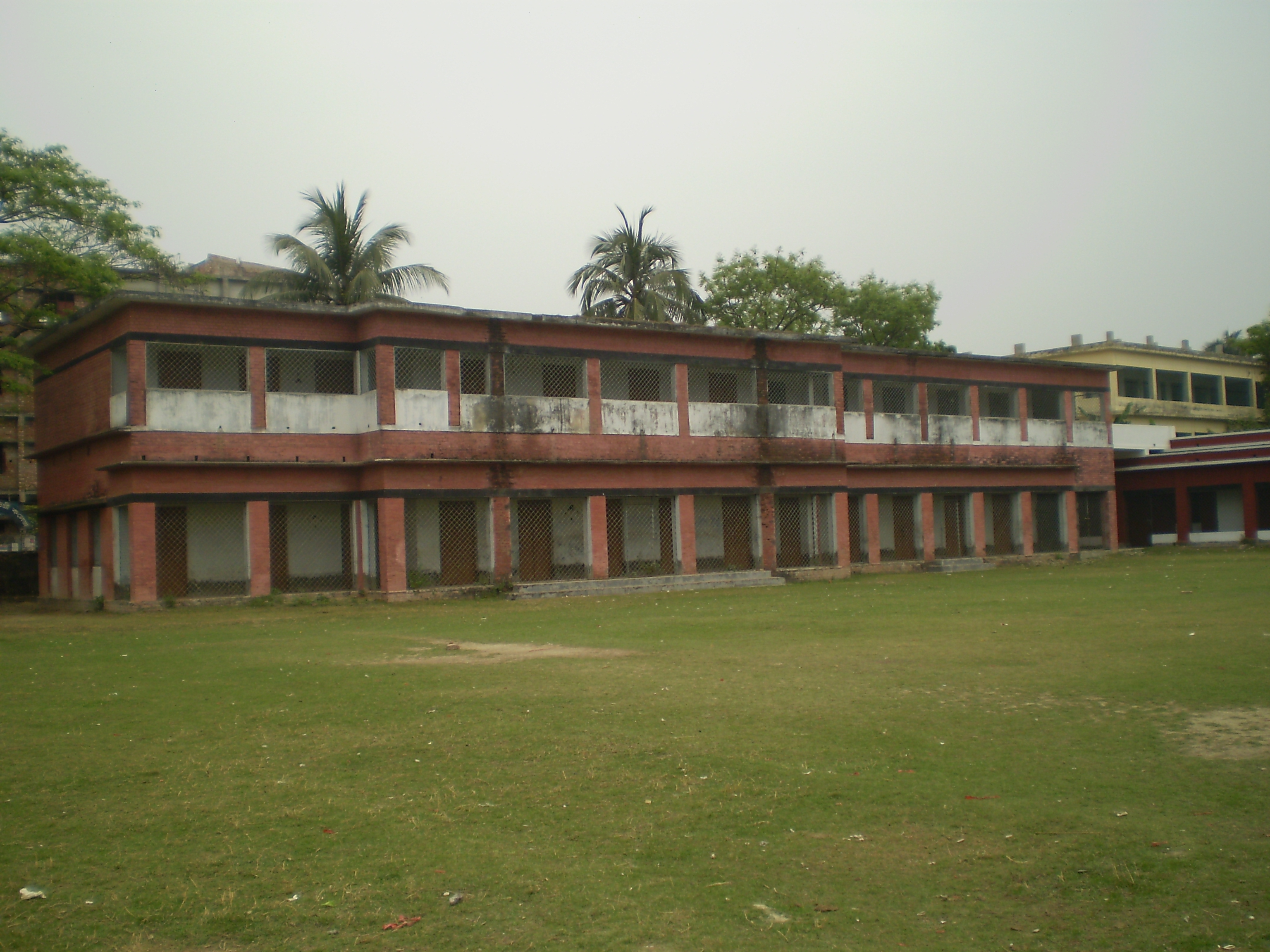
Laboratory building of the school.

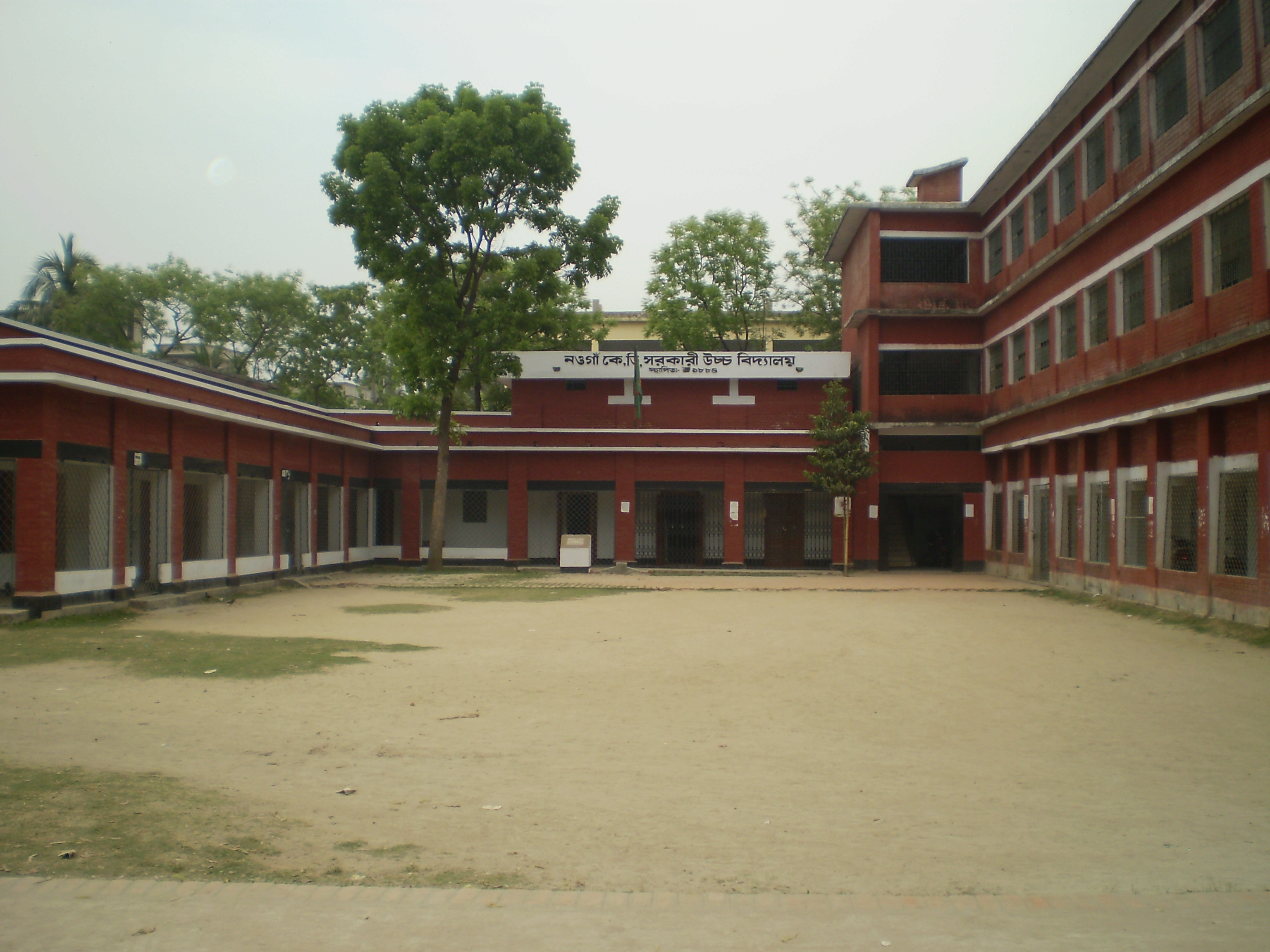
Main building of the school.
