= Shabnam Mustari =

Bangladeshi Nazrul Geeti singer

- শবনম মুশতারি
- Born: Naogaon
- Occupation: Singer
- Father: Talim Hossain
- Relatives: Yasmin Mustari; Parveen Mustari

Shabnam Mustari is a Bangladeshi Nazrul Geeti singer. She was awarded Ekushey Padak in 1997 and Nazrul Award in 2014 by the Government of Bangladesh. Her notable songs include Laili Tomar Esheche Phiria, Amai Nohe Go Bhalobasho Mor Gaan, Piya Piya Piya, and Tumi Shuniye Cheyona.

== Background ==
Mustari was born in Naogaon District to poet Talim Hossain and journalist Begum Mafruha Chowdhury. Her sisters Yasmin Mustari and Parveen Mustari are also Nazrul Geeti singers.

Mustari music career started in the 1960s. She taught young artists under "Poet Talim Hossain Trust".

Mustari was diagnosed with dementia in 2019.
