= Khirshin S. K. High School =

Coordinates: 25.015°N 88.803°E

Information
- Established: 1943; 82 years ago

Khirshin S.K. High School is a high school located at Ghoshnagar Union, Patnitala Upazila, Naogaon District in Bangladesh. It was established in 1943. It has only two groups, science and arts. S means Shamsuddin Chowdhury and K means Kolimuddin Chowdhury. They were two brothers who established the school. Around 600 students have studied at this school. Now the managing committee is trying to make it school and college. The school has some lands. It is not a fully government-operated school.
