= Khalid Hossain =

Bangladeshi Nazrul Geeti singer (1935–2019)

- খালিদ হোসেন
- Born: 4 December 1935; Krishnanagar, Nadia, Bengal Presidency, British India
- Died: 22 May 2019 (aged 83); Dhaka, Bangladesh
- Occupation: Singer
- Awards: Ekushey Padak (2000)

Khalid Hossain (4 December 1935 – 22 May 2019) was a Bangladeshi Nazrul Geeti singer. In recognition of his contribution in music, the government of Bangladesh awarded him the country's second highest civilian award Ekushey Padak in 2000.

== Early life ==
Khalid Hossain was born on 4 December 1935 at Krishnanagar, Nadia in the then British India now West Bengal. After the partition of India in 1947, he migrated to the Court Par neighborhood of Kushtia city with his family. In 1964, he permanently moved to Dhaka.

== Career ==
Khalid Hossain served as the president of Bangladesh Nazrul Sangeet Sangstha.

== Awards ==
- Nazrul Academy Award (2007)
- Bangladesh Shilpakala Academy Award
- Ekushey Padak (2000)
