= Sohrab Hossain =

Bangladeshi singer

- Born: 9 April 1922; Nadia, Bengal Presidency, British India
- Died: 27 December 2012 (aged 90); Dhaka, Bangladesh
- Occupation: Singer
- Known for: Nazrul Sangeet exponent

Sohrab Hossain (9 April 1922 – 27 December 2012) was a Bangladeshi singer and an exponent of Nazrul Sangeet. From his childhood, he was interested in music and started learning music. He met singer Abbas Uddin in a function in Ranaghat. Then he went to Kolkata. In Kolkata with the help of Abbas Uddin he started working on a music album but could not finish it.

After the partition of India, he came back to Dhaka where he got a Government job. With the musical troupe of Abbas Uddin he performed all over Bangladesh. He worked as a playback singer in several movies. He was also a teacher of few musical institutions.

Hossain received the Independence Day Award in 1980.

== Early life ==
Hossain was born on 9 April 1922 in Ayeshtala village near Ranaghat in Nadia, Bengal. He was interested in music since his very childhood. At the age of nine, he heard Nazrul Sangeet in Ranaghat. His first music teacher was Jainul Abedin. When he was a student in grade five, one day he was going to Ranaghat by boat and met Khirod Pal, a zamindar. Being impressed by talent of the young boy, the rich zamindar appoints Kiran Dey Chowdhury as his music teacher. But his family did not appreciate his fondness of music and stopped paying his school fees.

== Musical career ==
In a local function of Ranaghat Abbas Uddin, Mohammed Hossain Koshru, Jasim Uddin and Tabla player Bajlul Karim came to perform. In this function young Sohrab Hossain got an opportunity to perform. Then he went to Kolkata. There he started working at Shrirangam Theatre.

In Kolkata he met Abbas Uddin. Abbas Uddin gives him a job at the '"Songs and Publicity Department" where he joins at 6 June 1946. Then with help of Abbas Uddin, he makes agreement with Megaphonre Records, a music record company to record a music album. But, because of the communal riots of pre and post independence they could not work on this music album. Hossain also passed in HMV's music audition.

=== After partition of India ===
After the partition of India he went to Dhaka, Bangladesh (then East Pakistan). In Dhaka he got a Government job at the information department. Now he started to perform in different programs and radio programs and joined few music institutions like Bulbul Lolitokola Academy, Chhayanot, Shilpokola Academy, and Nazrul Academy etc. as a music teacher. With the musical troupe of Abbas Uddin he performed in different cities and places of Bangladesh. He also worked as a playback singer in few Bengali movies. He also acted in a Bengali drama Chhnera Tar directed by Tulshi Lahiri.

== Death ==
Hossain died on 27 December 2012 in a hospital in Dhaka. At the time of death Hossain was suffering from diabetes, respiratory problems, and various infectious diseases. After the death of Hossain, Bangladeshi cultural activist Kamal Lohani said "Sohrab Hossain was a humble and humorous person. He could perform all the diverse subgenres of Nazrul Sangeet—be it Kirtan or satirical songs. He would follow proper notations both in singing and in teaching. If we follow the right path showed by the artiste, we can then properly pay tribute to him"

== Filmography ==
- E Desh Tomar Amar
- Godhulir Prem
- Je Nodi Morupothe
- Matir Pahar
- Shit Bikel

== Awards ==
- Independence Day Award (1980)
- Nazrul Academy Award
- Channel I award
- Nazrul University honours (2009)
