= Talim Hossain =

Bangladeshi poet

- তালিম হোসেইন
- Born: 29 October 1918; Badalgachhi, Naogaon, Bengal Presidency, British India
- Died: 21 February 1999 (aged 80)
- Occupation: Poet
- Known for: Founder of Kabi Nazrul Institute
- Children: Shabnam Mustari

Talim Hossain (29 October 1918 – 21 February 1999) was a Bangladeshi poet. He was the founder of Kabi Nazrul Institute in Dhaka. He was the editor of the literary magazine Mahe Nao in the 1960s. He was awarded Ekushey Padak in 1982 by the Government of Bangladesh for his contribution to Bengali literature.

== Career ==
Hossain was a Nazrul exponent. Along with musician Sudhin Das, he took the initiative to formulate Swaralipi of Nazrul Sangeet for the first time. He wrote books including "Dishari", "Shahin" and "Nuher Jahaj". A 500-page complete works of Hossain, "Kavita Samagra", was released in 1999.

A foundation by Hossain, "Poet Talim Hossain Trust", awards researchers and practitioners on Nazrul annually since 1998.

== Personal life ==
Hossain was born in Badalgachhi Upazila of Naogaon District. He was married to writer Mafruha Chowdhury. They had three daughters, Shabnam Mustari, Parvin Mustari and Yasmin Mustari. They are all Nazrul Sangeet singers.
