= Sapahar Pilot High School =

Sapahar Pilot High School, Naogaon
- সাপাহার পাইলট উচ্চ বিদ্যালয়, নওগাঁ।
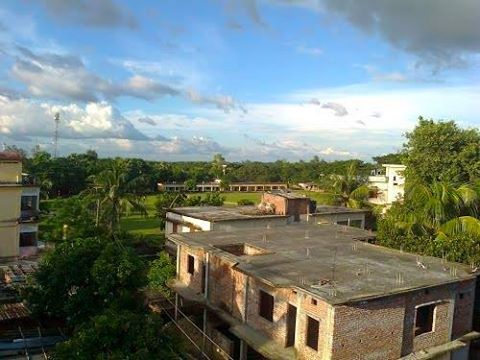
- Sapahar Pilot High School, Naogaon

Location
- Professor Para, College Road, Sapahar; Bangladesh
- Coordinates: 25.1234°N 88.5923°E

Information
- Type: Non Govt.
- Established: 1962
- School board: Rajshahi Education Board
- Headmaster: Md. Sajedul Alam
- Grades: 6–10
- Gender: Combined
- Enrollment: 950
- Campus type: Town
- Colors: White and Navy Blue
- Website: http://www.sphs1962.edu.bd/

Sapahar Pilot High School (Bengali: সাপাহার পাইলট উচ্চ বিদ্যালয়) is a secondary school at Sapahar in Sapahar Upazila, Naogaon District, Bangladesh, established in 1962. It is one of the best high school in Sapahar Upazila. In 2012, the school celebrated its fiftieth anniversary. The unique Educational Institute Identification Number (EIIN) of this institution is 123750.
