= Naogaon Government College =

Bangladeshi college in Naogaon, Ragshahi

Coordinates: 24.8259°N 88.9379°E

- নওগাঁ সরকারি কলেজ
- Motto: জ্ঞানই শক্তি
- Motto in English: Knowledge is power
- Type: Public
- Established: 1961
- Principal: Shah Alam
- Academic staff: 83
- Administrative staff: 54
- Students: 16,000
- Location: Naogaon, Rajshahi, Bangladesh
- Website: www.naogc.edu.bd

Naogaon Government College (Bengali: নওগাঁ সরকারি কলেজ) is a public educational institution in Naogaon District, Bangladesh. It was established in 1961 with 300 students, and currently serves about 16,000. It is situated in the north-east part of Naogaon and is authorized by the National University.

Its 11-acre (45,000 m^{2}) campus has two three-story buildings, one of which is used for administrative and academic purpose and also includes a library more than 25,000 books. The second building is for the science faculty.

Naogaon Government College was nationalized in 1980.

== History ==
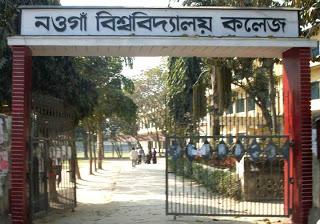
Gate of Naogaon Govt. College

The foundation stone of Naogaon Degree College was laid in 1959 by subdistrict administrator Abdul Baten at the north-east edge of Naogaon. Subdistrict administrator Abdur Rob Chawdhory carried on the plan and established the college in 1962. It offered intermediate and 3-year (pass level) undergraduate degrees. In 1980, the college was amalgamated with BMC College and nationalized. Now it is Naogaon Government College. In 1996, the college had started honors in 10 subjects and masters in 9 subjects. Its area is almost 11 acres.

== Academic departments ==
The college has 16 departments:

- Department of Bangla
- Department of English
- Department of Economics
- Department of Political Science
- Department of Arabic & Islamic Studies
- Department of Islamic History and Culture
- Department of Geography & Environment
- Department of Physics
- Department of Zoology
- Department of Botany
- Department of Chemistry
- Department of Mathematics
- Department of History
- Department of Marketing
- Department of Psychology
- Department of Philosophy
- Department of Statistics

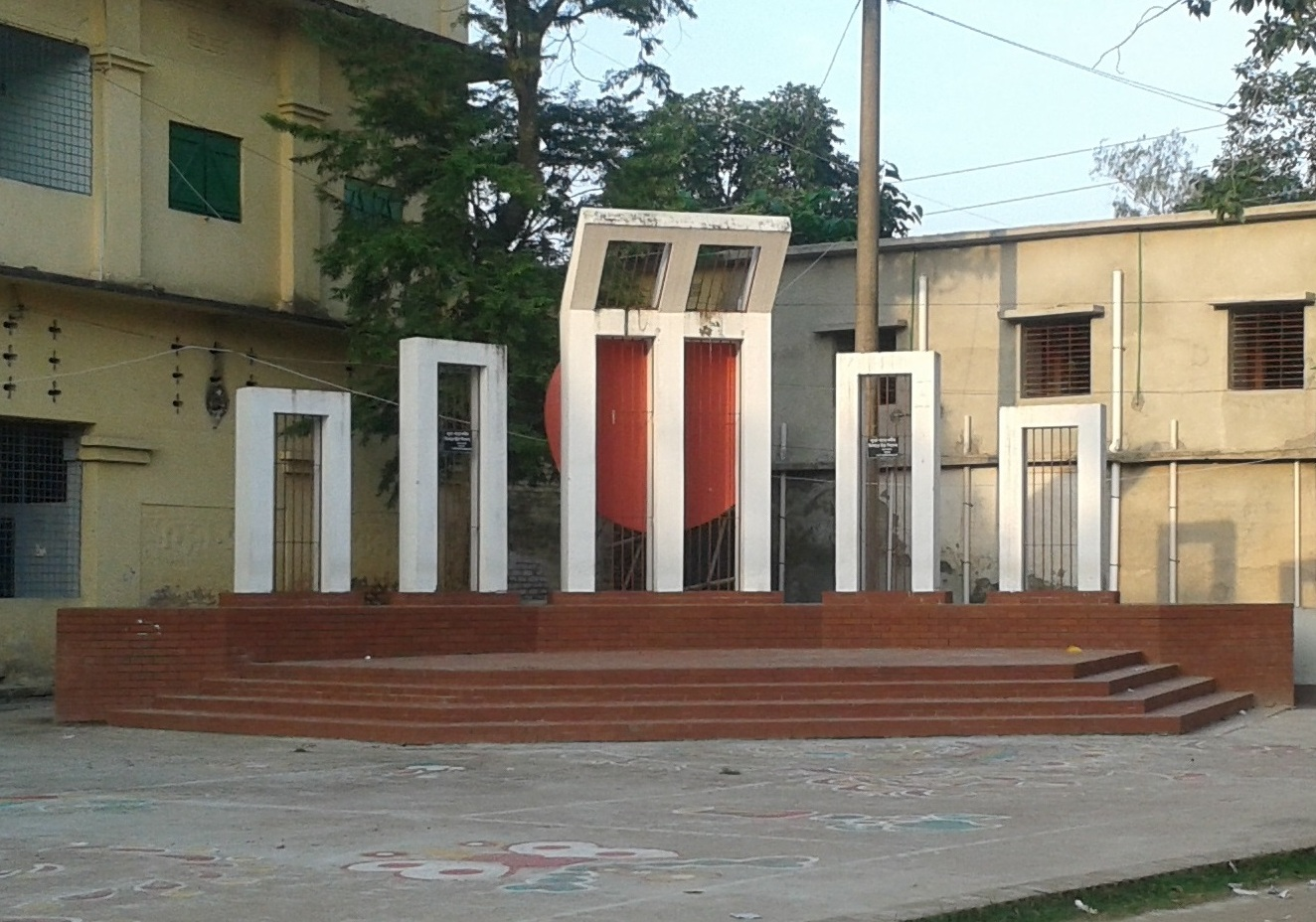
Shaheed Minar

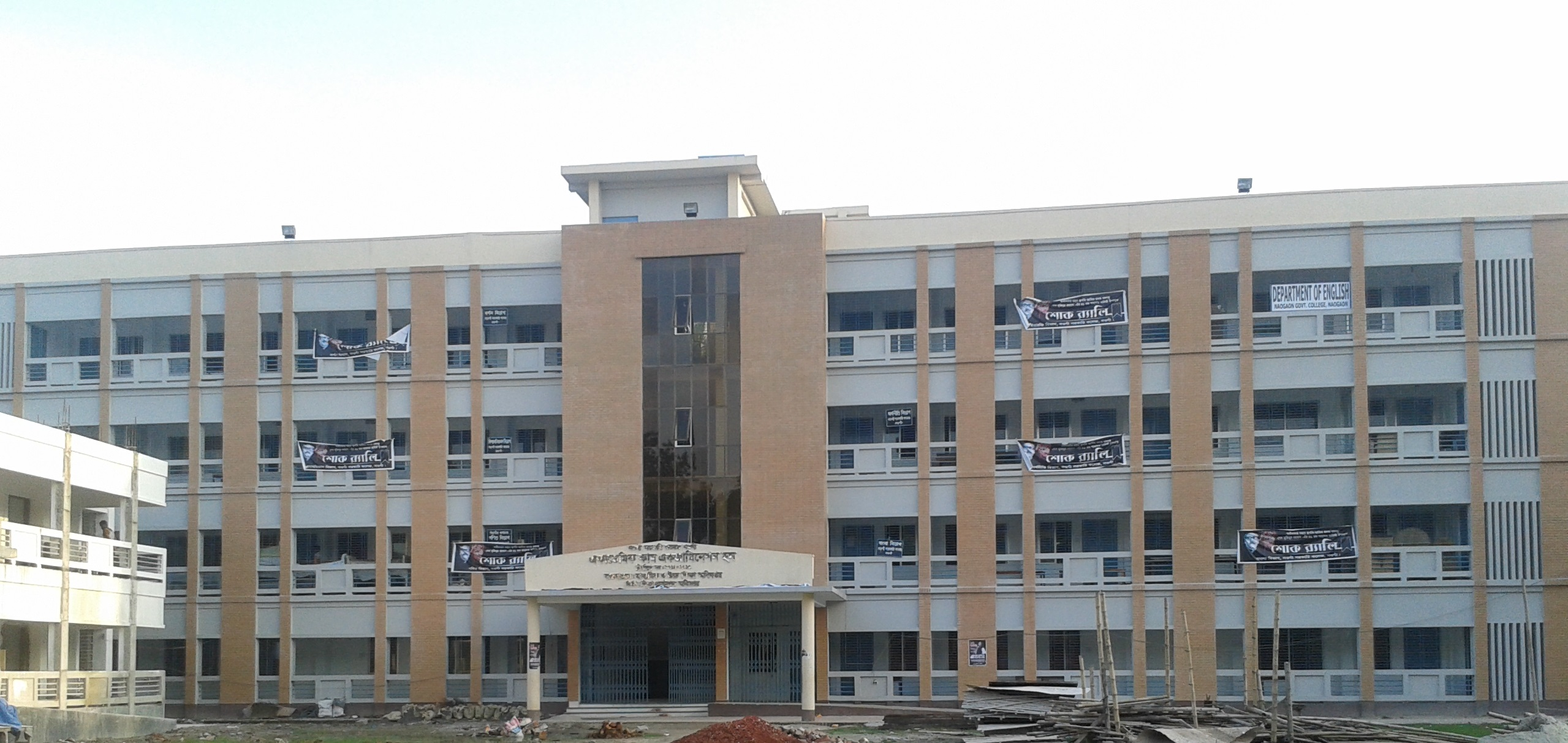
Academic and Examination Hall

== Facilities ==
=== Residential student halls ===
There are 2 residential Hall for male students And 2 for female students.

== Notable alumni ==
- Sadhan Chandra Majumder, minister of food (2019–2024)

== See also ==
- Chalkmuli High School
- Chalkmomin Government Primary School
- Naogaon Zilla School
- Nazipur Government College
