= Sapahar Upazila =

Sapahar Upazila সাপাহার উপজেলা
- Upazila of Bangladesh
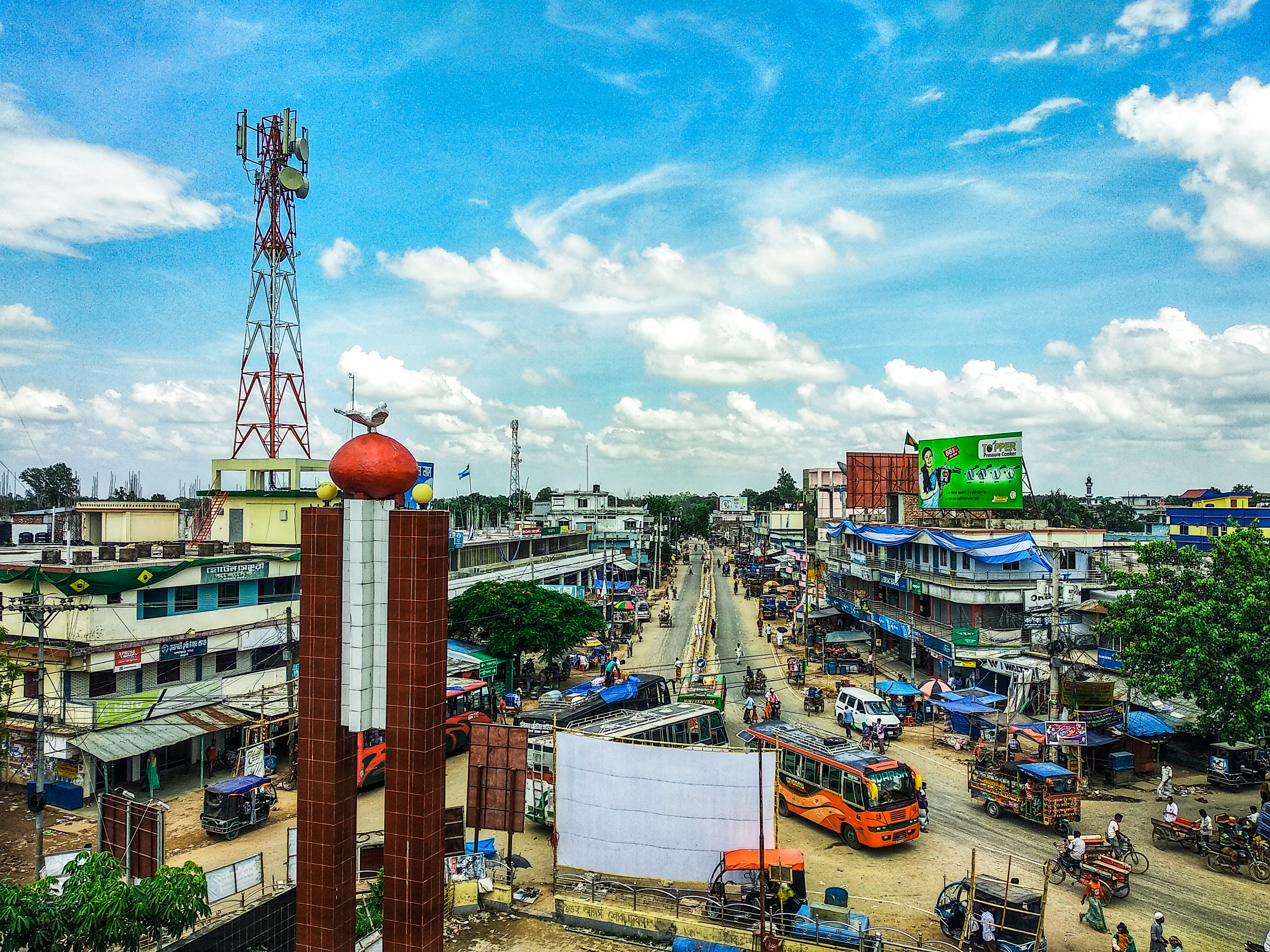
- View of Sapahar town

- Coordinates: 25°7.5′N 88°34.9′E
- Country: Bangladesh
- Division: Rajshahi
- District: Naogaon

Government
  - Chairman: Shahjahan Mandal

Area
  - Upazila of Bangladesh: 244.48 km^{2} (94.39 sq mi)
  - Metro: 8.3 km^{2} (3.2 sq mi)

Population (2022)
  - Upazila of Bangladesh: 184,817
  - Density: 755.96/km^{2} (1,957.9/sq mi)
- Time zone: UTC+6 (BST)
- Postal code: 6560
- Website: Official Map of Sapahar

Sapahar Upazila mauza geocode map

Sapahar Upazila (Bengali: সাপাহার উপজেলা) is an upazila of Naogaon District in the Division of Rajshahi, Bangladesh.

== Geography ==
Map of Naogaon District

Sapahar is located at 25.1250°N 88.5819°E. It has 36,232 households and total area 244.48 km^{2}.

Sapahar Upazila is bounded by Tapan CD Block in Dakshin Dinajpur district, West Bengal, India, on the north, Patnitala Upazila on the east, Porsha Upazila on the south, and Bamangola CD Block, in Malda district, West Bengal, on the west. Main river Punarbhaba at Patari village and Jabai Beel are notable.

== Demographics ==
Religions in Sapahar Upazila (2022)
Religion	Percent
Islam	93.53%
Hinduism	5.35%
Christianity	0.80%
Other or not stated	0.31%

According to the 2022 Bangladeshi census, Sapahar Upazila had 47,718 households and a population of 184,817. 9.70% of the population were under 5 years of age. Sapahar had a literacy rate (age 7 and over) of 73.11%: 73.76% for males and 72.46% for females, and a sex ratio of 100.12 males for every 100 females. 18,480 (10.00%) lived in urban areas. Ethnic population is 4,909 (2.66%), of which Oraon are 2,058 and Santal are 1320.

Population of upazila by ethnicity (2022)
1. Bengali (97.3%)
2. Oraon (1.11%)
3. Others (1.55%)

According to the 2011 Census of Bangladesh, Sapahar Upazila had 36,232 households and a population of 161,792. 34,245 (21.17%) were under 10 years of age. Sapahar had a literacy rate (age 7 and over) of 42.19%, compared to the national average of 51.8%, and a sex ratio of 990 females per 1000 males. 12,696 (7.85%) lived in urban areas. Ethnic population was 5,520 (3.41%), of which Santal were 1,851, Oraon 1,568 and Barman 796.

== Economy ==
Most of the people of the Sapahar Upazila depends on agriculture for a living. The main corps are mango, paddy, wheat, mustard, and vegetables.

== Points of interest ==
- Jobay Beel

== Administration ==
Sapahar Thana was formed in 1979. It was turned into an upazila in 1985.

The Upazila is divided into six union parishads: Aihai, Goala, Pathari, Sapahar, Shiranti, and Tilna. The union parishads are subdivided into 151 mauzas and 232 villages.

=== Town profile ===
Sapahar Sadar Town covers an area of 8.4 square kilometres (3.2 sq mi). The town area consists of ward no. 1, 2, 4 and partially 3. According to the census of 2011, It has a population of 12696. About 2924 households are situated here.

== Education ==
Tertiary educational institutions in Sapahar include:

- Sapahar Government College
- Chowdhury Chan Mohammad Women College
- Bhioil Degree College
- Tilna Degree College
- Dighirhat Degree College
- Sapahar Technical And Business Management College

=== High schools ===
- Al-Helal Islami Academy & College, Sapahar, Naogaon
- Sapahar Pilot High School, Naogaon
- Sapahar Govt. Girls High School
- Zaman Nagor Girls High School
- Dangapara High School
- Shironty Moinakuri High School
- Tilna ML High School
- Tilna Girls High School
- Jobay High School
- Aihai High School
- Tiloni-Patari High School
- Mirapara High School
- Bhioil High School
- Kalmudanga High School
- Goala High School
- Nischinta Pur High School
- Khottapara High School
- Koch Kurulia High School
- Teghoria B.L High School
- Tatoir Bakharpur High School
- Asharanda High School
- Chalkgopal High School
- Sapahar Computer Training Center
- Sapahar Technical Institute

== Gallery ==
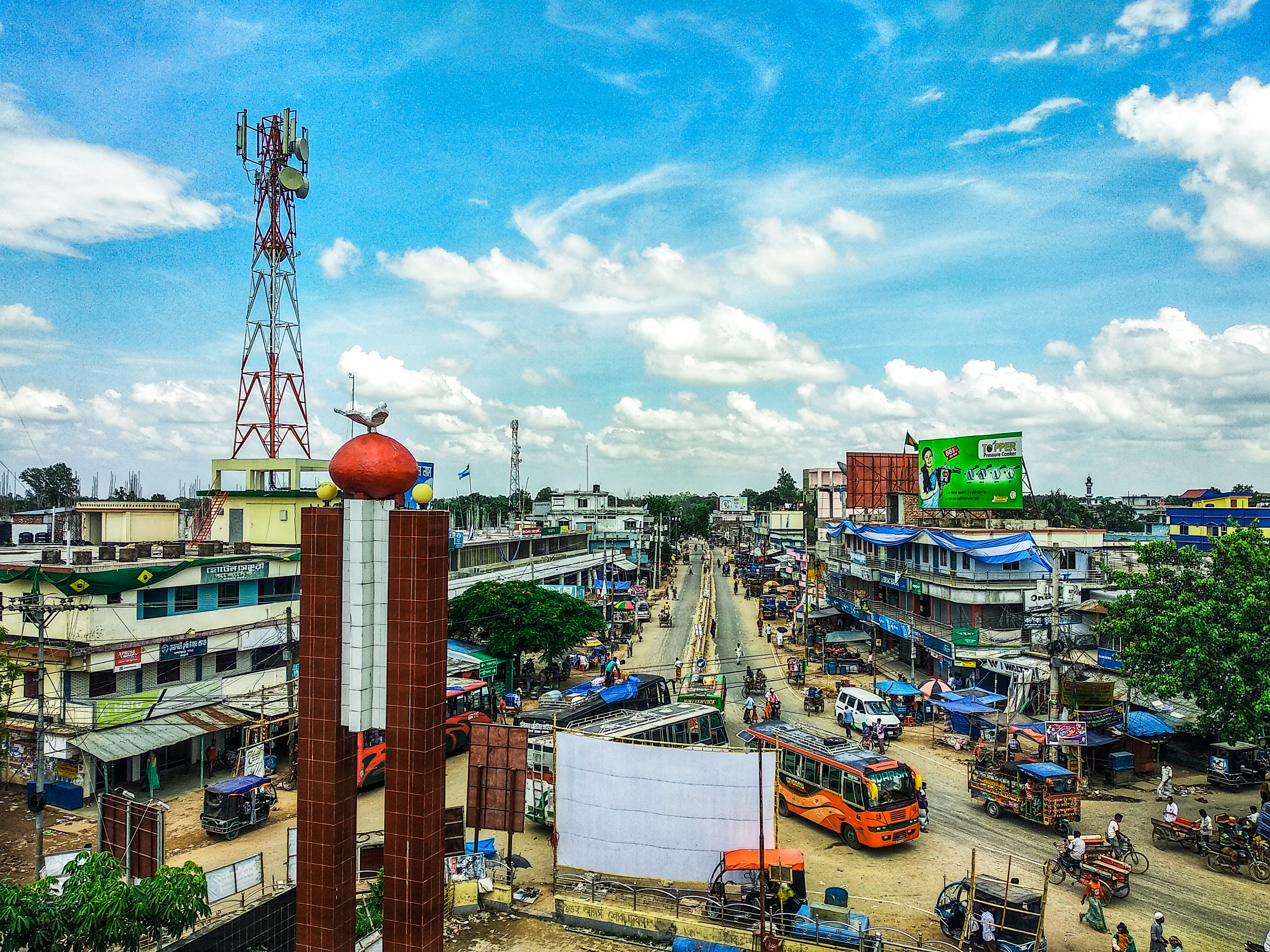
জিরো পয়েন্ট

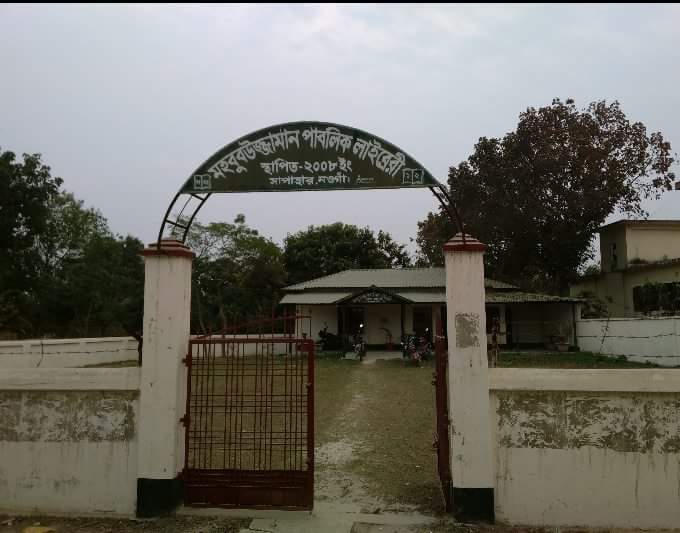
Public Library

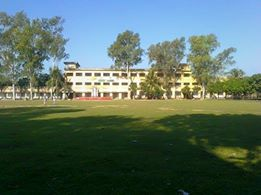
Academic Building

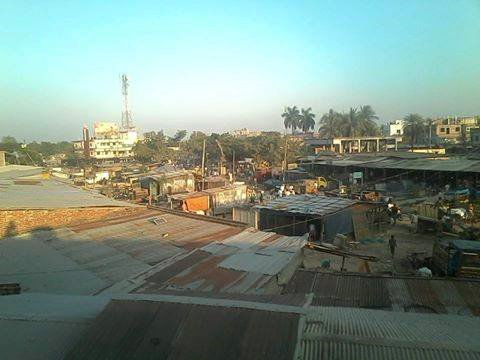
Town area

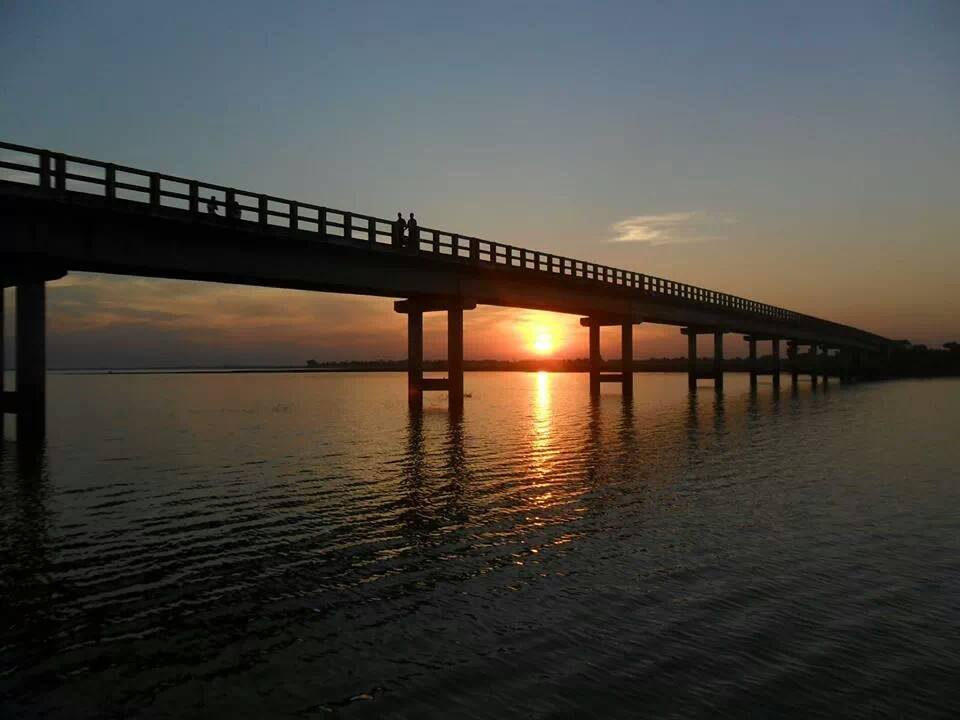
Jobay Bridge

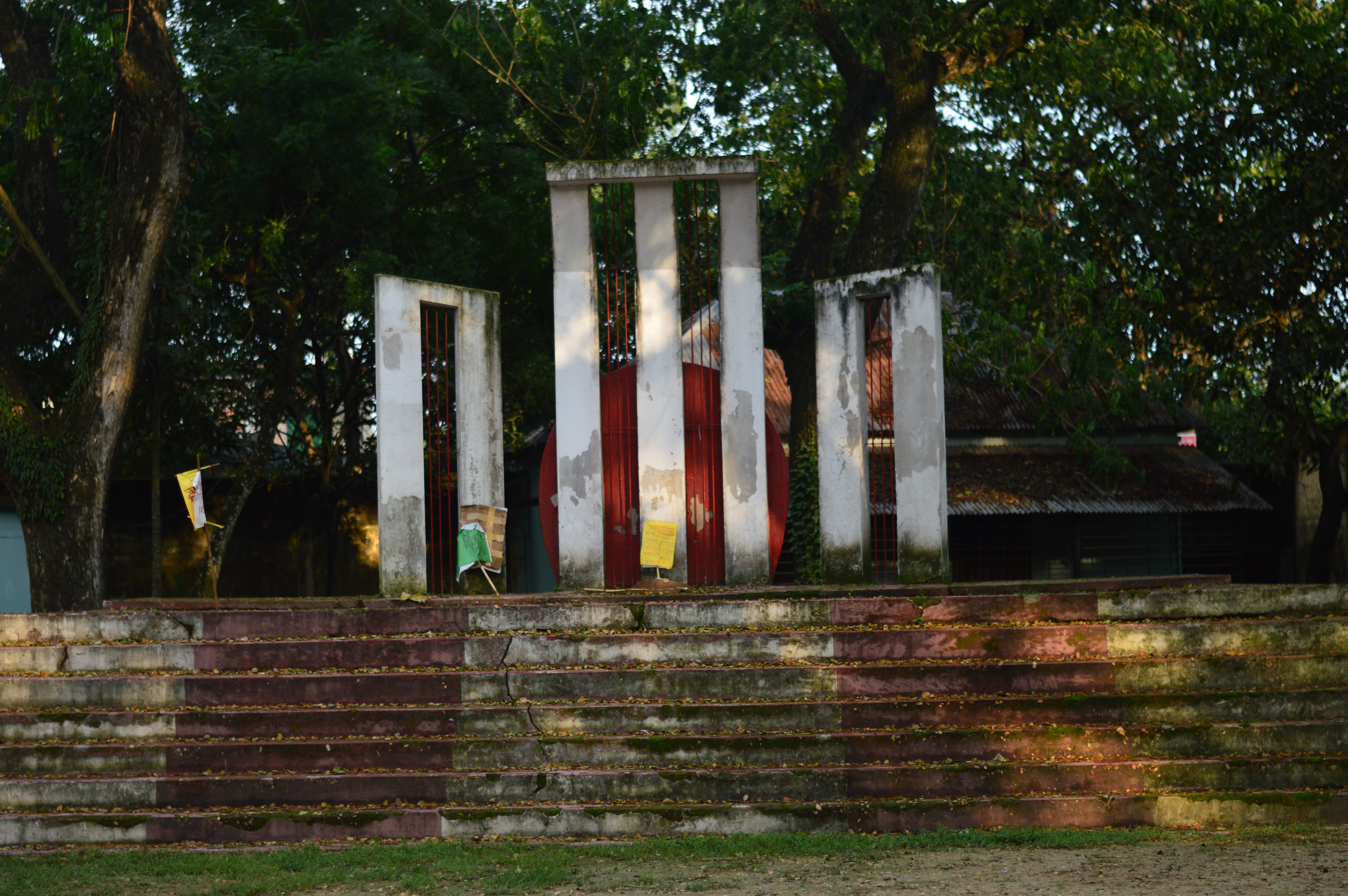
Upazila Chattar Shaheed Minar

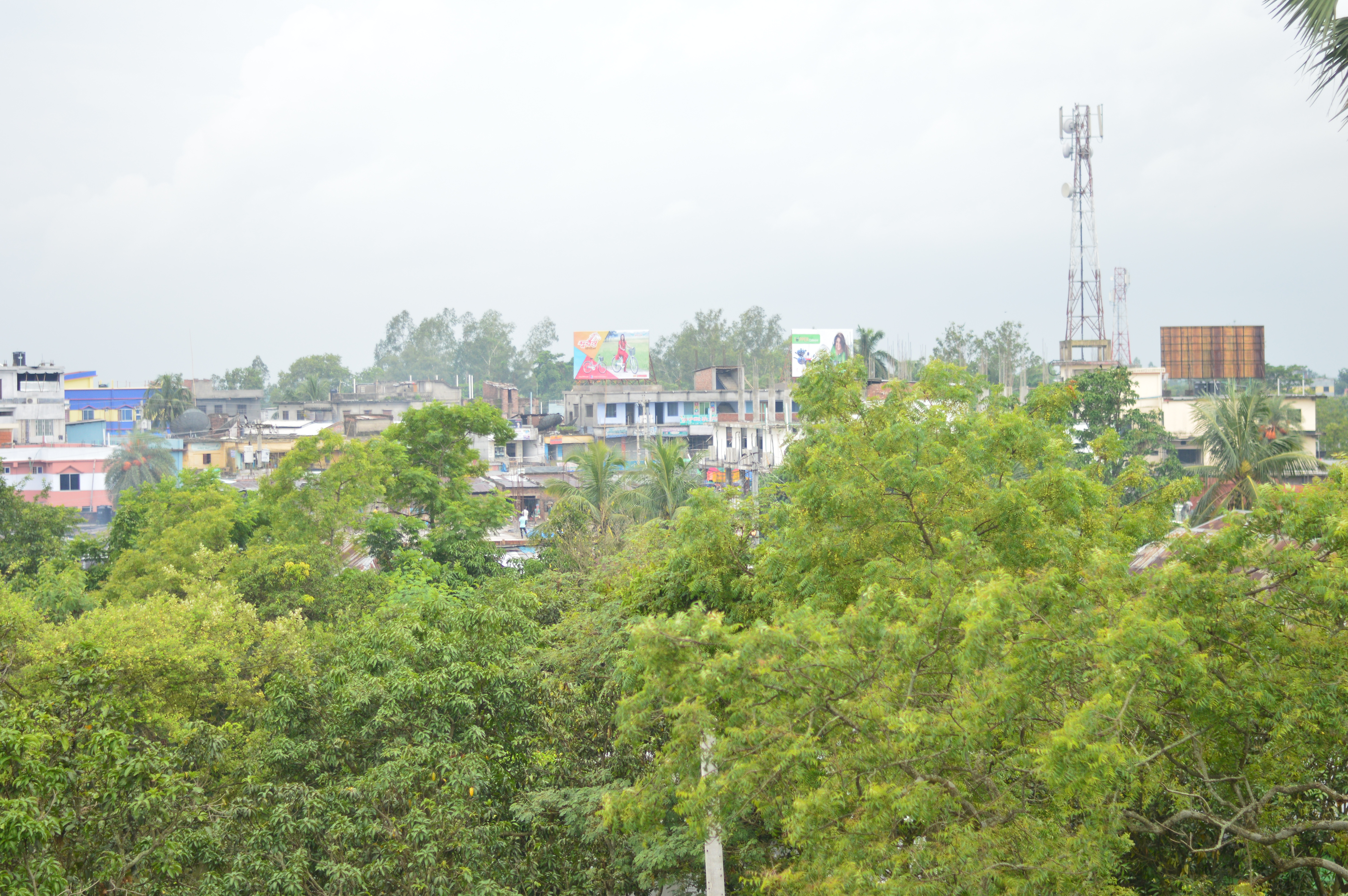
Sapahar Town

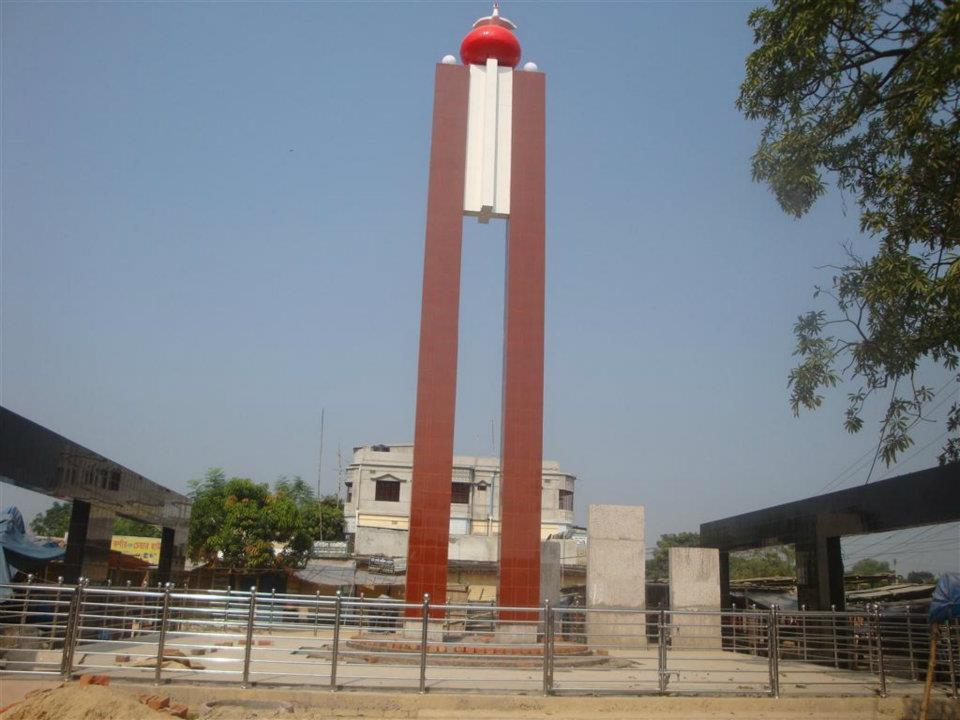
Central Liberation War Monument
