= Naogaon District =

District on Bangladesh in Rajshahi Division

Naogaon District নওগাঁ জেলা
- District of Bangladesh
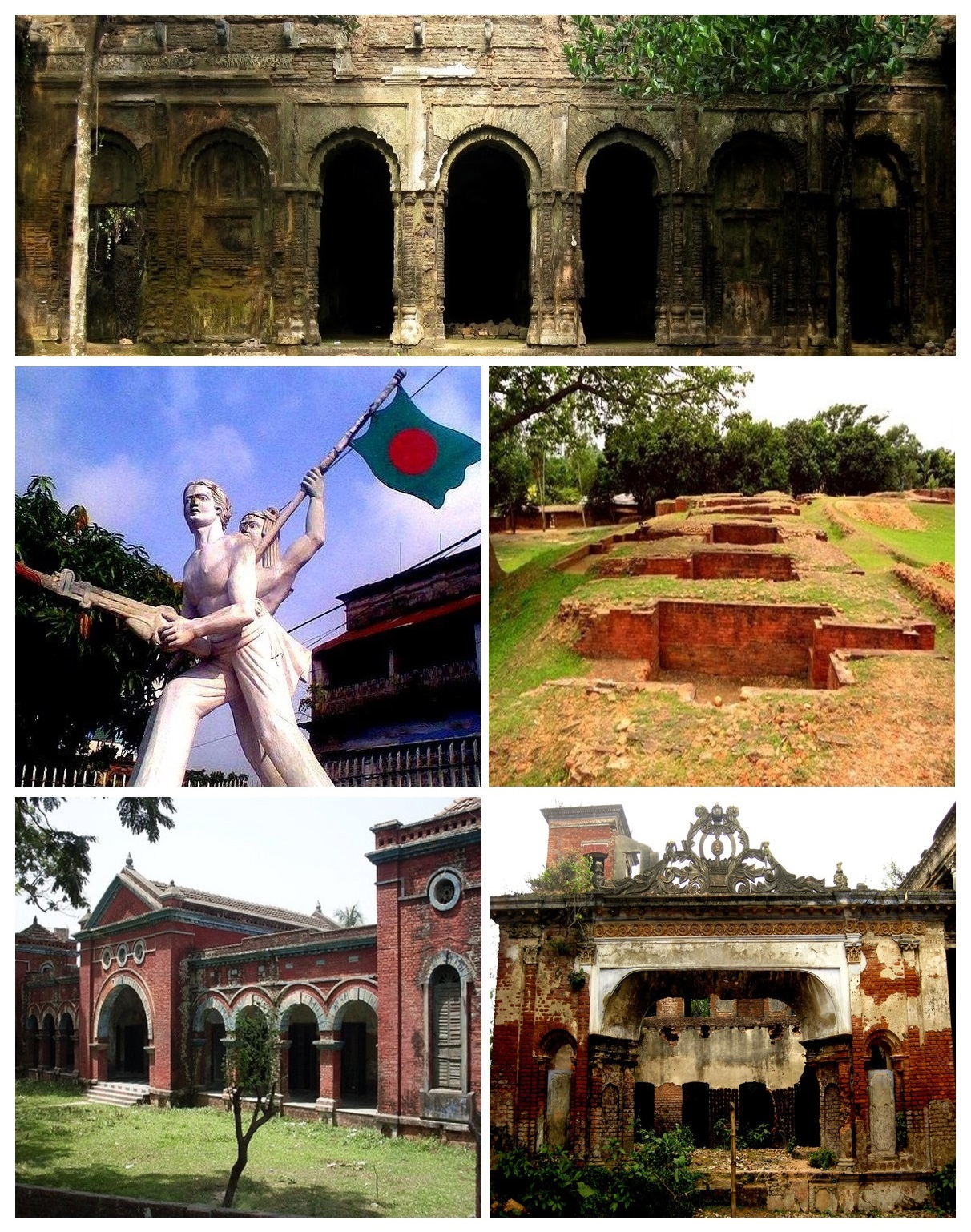
- Clockwise from top: Balihar Rajbari, Jogoddol Bihar, Dubalhati Rajbari, Office of Ganja Society, Shadhinota Monument

- Location of Naogaon District in Bangladesh
- Expandable map of Naogaon District
- Coordinates: 24.90°N 88.75°E
- Country: Bangladesh
- Division: Rajshahi Division
- Headquarters: Naogaon

Government
  - Deputy Commissioner: Md Golam Maola

Area
  - Total: 3,435.67 km^{2} (1,326.52 sq mi)

Population (2022)
  - Total: 2,784,599
  - Density: 810.497/km^{2} (2,099.18/sq mi)
- Time zone: UTC+06:00 (BST)
- Postal code: 6500
- Area code: 0741
- ISO 3166 code: BD-48
- HDI (2023): 0.701 medium · 6th of 2023
- Website: www.dcnaogaon.gov.bd

Naogaon District (Bengali: নওগাঁ জেলা) is a district in northern Bangladesh, and part of Rajshahi Division. It is named after its headquarters, the city of Naogaon in Naogaon Sadar Upazila.

== Demographics ==
Historical population
| Year | Pop. | ±% p.a. |
|---|---|---|
| 1974 | 1,424,082 | — |
| 1981 | 1,730,078 | +2.82% |
| 1991 | 2,148,053 | +2.19% |
| 2001 | 2,391,555 | +1.08% |
| 2011 | 2,600,157 | +0.84% |
| 2022 | 2,784,599 | +0.62% |

According to the 2022 Census of Bangladesh, Naogaon District has 765,457 households and a population of 2,784,599 with an average 3.59 people per household. Among the population, 436,445 (15.67%) inhabitants are under 10 years of age. The population density is 810 people per km^{2}. Naogaon District has a literacy rate (age 7 and over) of 72.24%, compared to the national average of 74.80%, and a sex ratio of 97.58 males per 100 females. Approximately, 14.97% (416,809) of the population live in urban areas.

Religions in Naogaon District (2022)
| Religion | Percent |
| Muslims | 86.88% |
| Hindus | 11.54% |
| Christians | 0.77% |
| Other or not stated | 0.81% |

Religion in present-day Naogaon District
| Religion | 1941 (Note: Naogaon subdivision of Rajshahi district and Porsha, Patnitala and Dhamoirhat thanas of Dinajpur district) | | 1981 | | 1991 | | 2001 | | 2011 | | 2022 | |
| Religion | Pop. | % | Pop. | % | Pop. | % | Pop. | % | Pop. | % | Pop. | % |
|---|---|---|---|---|---|---|---|---|---|---|---|---|
| Islam | 572,627 | 69.81% | 1,438,480 | 83.14% | 1,815,313 | 84.51% | 2,062,616 | 86.25% | 2,250,427 | 86.55% | 2,419,236 | 86.88% |
| Hinduism | 192,158 | 23.43% | 243,034 | 14.05% | 268,548 | 12.50% | 256,596 | 10.73% | 287,919 | 11.08% | 321,341 | 11.54% |
| Tribal religion | 55,239 | 6.73% | —N/a | —N/a | —N/a | —N/a | —N/a | —N/a | —N/a | —N/a | —N/a | —N/a |
| Christianity | 228 | 0.03% | 6,408 | 0.37% | 11,054 | 0.51% | 14,313 | 0.60% | 18,590 | 0.71% | 21,386 | 0.77% |
| Others (Note: Including Jainism, Buddhism, Zoroastrianism, Judaism, Ad-Dharmis, or not stated) | 38 | 0.00% | 42,156 | 2.44% | 53,138 | 2.48% | 57,830 | 2.42% | 43,221 | 1.66% | 22,636 | 0.81% |
| Total Population | 820,290 | 100% | 1,730,078 | 100% | 2,148,053 | 100% | 2,391,555 | 100% | 2,600,157 | 100% | 2,784,599 | 100% |

Muslims make up 86.88% of the population, while Hindus are 11.54% and Christians 0.77% of the population respectively. Other religions are 0.81% of the population.

Population of Naogaon district by ethnicity (2022)
1. Bengali (96.2%)
2. Oraon (1.19%)
3. Munda (0.90%)
4. Santal (0.68%)
5. Barman (0.43%)
6. Others (0.65%)

As of 2022, ethnic minorities are 107,312 (3.85%). This was the largest ethnic minority population in Bangladesh outside the Chittagong Hill Tracts. Of these 33,198 are Oraon, 25,194 Munda, 18,903 Santal and 11,918 Barman.

== Economy ==
Today Naogaon District is considered the bread basket of Bangladesh. It is in the central part of the historical Varendra region of Bengal, with an area of about 3,435.67 square kilometres (1,326.52 sq mi), about 80% of which is under cultivation. The soil of the area is a fertile inorganic clay called loam.

The total population of the area is about 28 lac, and most of the people of the district are farmers. The literacy rate is 72.14%. Crops grown in the district include paddy, mango, jute, wheat, maize, sugar cane, potatoes, pulses, oil seeds, brinjal, onions, and garlic. The total production of paddy and wheat in 2009-2010 was 13,58,432 metric tons (about 39% in growth economy), including a surplus of 8,26,835 metric tons. Today it is the top listed district in the side of rice production and has the highest number of rice processing mills of any district.

Naogaon is now the country's prime hub for mango harvest. Statistics from Bangladesh's Department of Agricultural Extension show that Naogaon alone produced over 3.33 lakh tonnes mango in fiscal 2017–18, far more than Chapainawabganj's production of 2.74 lakh tonnes and Rajshahi's 2.13 lakh tonnes.

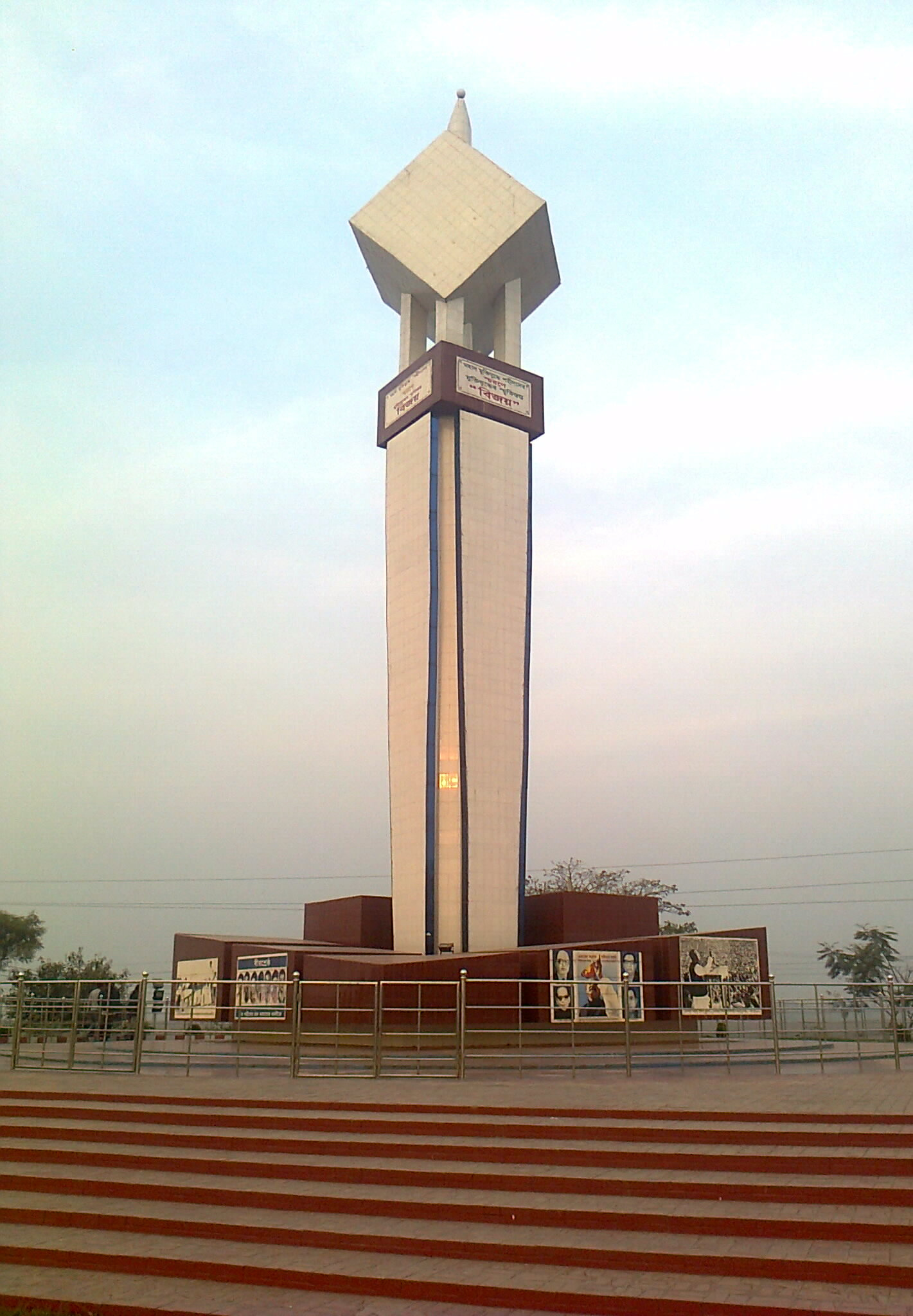
Bijoy Independence War Monument

== Points of interest ==
=== Paharpur ===
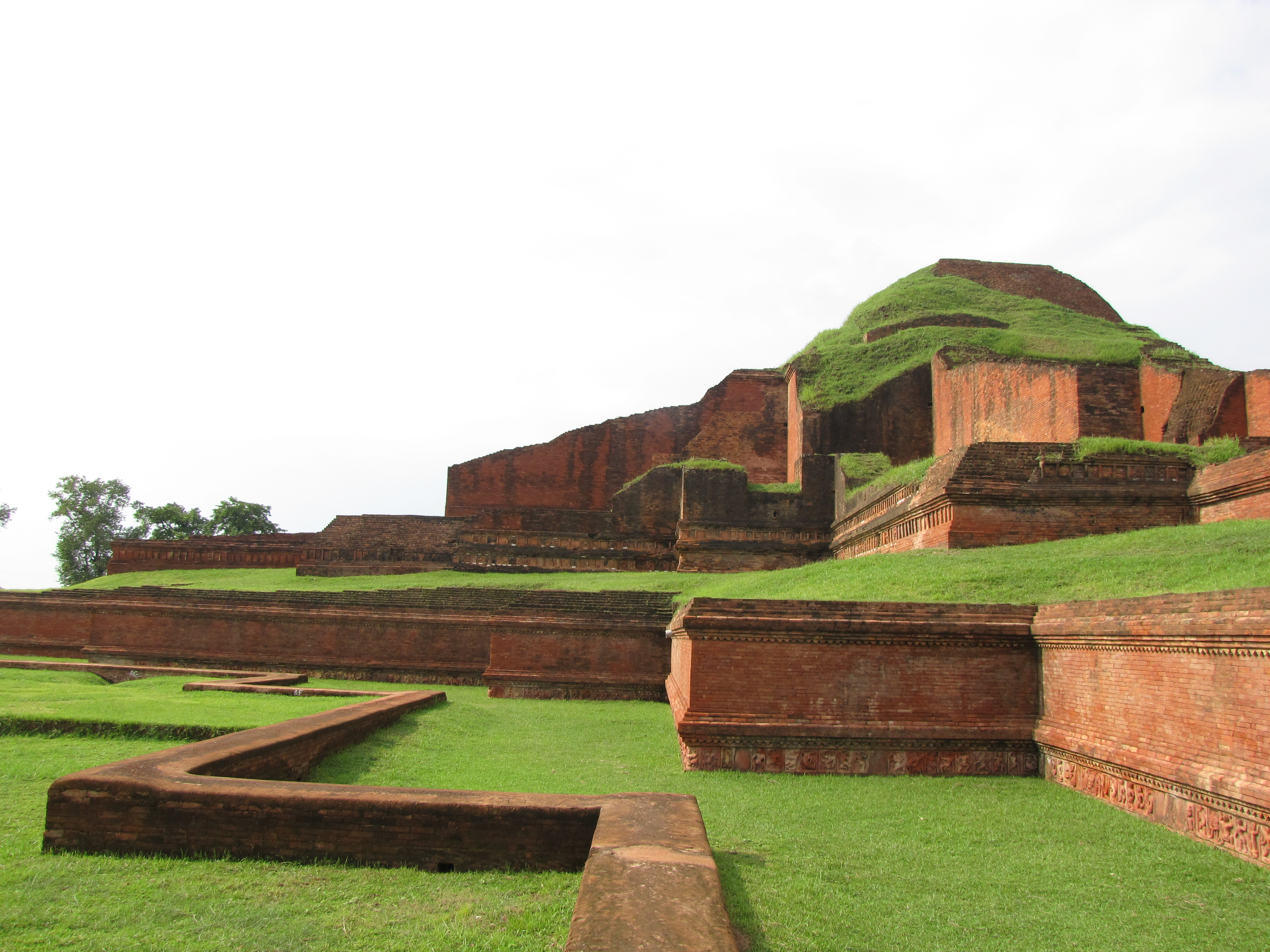
Somapura Mahavihara

Paharpur is a small village 5 km west of Jamalganj in the Naogaon district where the remains of the Somapura Mahavihara monastery have been excavated. This 7th-century archaeological find covers an area of approximately 27 acres (110,000 m^{2}) of land. The entire establishment, occupying a quadrangular court, measures more than 900 ft (270 m) and is from 12 to 15 ft (3.7 to 4.6 m) in height. With an elaborate gateway complex on the north, there are 45 cells on the north and 44 on each of the other three sides, for a total number of 177 rooms. The architecture of the pyramidal cruciform temple is influenced by those of South-East Asia, especially Myanmar and Java. It takes its name from a high mound, which looked like a pahar, or hillock.

A site museum built recently houses the representative collection of objects recovered from the area. The excavated findings have also been preserved at the Varendra Research Museum at Rajshahi. The antiquities of the museum include terracotta plaques, images of different gods and goddesses, pottery, coin inscriptions, ornamental bricks, and other minor clay objects.

Nine miles west-southwest of Somapura Mahavihara is the archaeological site of Halud Vihara, which has been tentatively listed as a UNESCO World Heritage Site.

=== Kusumba Mosque ===
Kusumba Mosque is on the west bank of the Atrai River in Manda Upazila. It was built in 1558-59 during the period of Afgan rule in Bengal by a high-ranking official named Sulaiman. It was constructed in a Bengal style.

=== Jagaddala Mahavihara ===
Jagaddala Mahavihara (fl. late 11th century-mid-12th century) was a Buddhist monastery and seat of learning in Varendra, a geographical unit in present north Bengal in Bangladesh. It was founded by the later kings of the Pāla dynasty, probably Ramapala (c. 1077–1120), likely at a site near the present village of Jagddal in Dhamoirhat Upazila in northwest Bangladesh on the border with India. It is tentatively listed as UNESCO World Heritage Site.

=== Patisar ===
Patisar village is associated with Rabindranath Tagore. It is situated on the banks of the river Nagor, 12 kilometers south-east of the Atrai railway station and 26 kilometers from the district town. The headquarters of the Tagore family's zamindari in Kaligram Pargana was located at Patisar. Dwarkanath Tagore, the grandfather of Rabindranath Tagore, purchased this zamindari in 1830. Rabindranath Tagore first came to Patisar in January 1891.

The architectural design of the two-storied Kuthibari of Patisar is similar to that of Shilaidaha-Shahjadpur. The buildings, adjacent to the main mansion, are now reduced to ruins. A pond, named Rabindrasarobar, is now a silted-up marsh. During his stay at Patisar, Tagore composed various poems, stories, novels, essays, and the verse-play Biday Abhishap. He also established many primary schools, a school named Rathindranath High School, charitable dispensaries, and Patisar Krishi Bank (1905). He introduced tractors in Patisar and formed cooperative societies for the development of agriculture, handloom, and pottery.

In 1921, when the zamindari was divided, Patisar was included in Tagore's share. When the poet was awarded the Nobel Prize, the tenants of Patisar gave him an address of honor (1913). On the request of his tenants, Tagore visited Patisar in 1937 for the last time on the occasion of Punya. Every year many devotees of Tagore come from home and abroad to visit Patisar. On the occasions of Tagore's birth and death anniversaries, the Government arranges and gives all facilities to make discussion meetings and cultural functions that are held at Patisar.

=== Dubalhati ===
Dubalhati is an ancient site in the southwestern part of the district. The road to Dubalhati passes through the wide body of water known as “Dighli beel” (a beel is a large shallow lake or marsh). There is a large well in the center of the road for providing travelers with water.

A feature of Dubalhati is the "Raja's Mansion" (Jomidar Bari or Rajbari). The house has two parts; the main part, Darbar Hall, is residential and used for holding seminars, while the other part, Natto Shalla, is for prayers. The rajbari is a three-story building standing on wide and long masonry slender spiral columns. There are four large dighi (small lakes) around the site.

The rajbari was first built by Raja Horandro Ray Choudhory during the Pala Dynasty (781–1124). About 53 rajas have held the title, beginning with Jogotram, and ending with Haranath Ray Bahadur II in the 1940s. Raja Horonath Ray Bahadur I was notable for his construction of schools in the Rajshahi and Naogaon districts, including Natto Shala, Baganbari, Dubalhati High school, Naogaon K.D. School. He contributed sums of money to the Rajshahi Government College. He founded Dubalhati Raja Horonuth High School, only the second high school in the Rajshahi Division, in 1864. He had many wells and dhighis (small lakes) dug for providing drinking and irrigation water and provided food to the populace during the famine of 1874. This raj bari was destroyed during the Hindu Muslim riots in 1946. The members of this family include Krinkari Ray Choudhary (son of Horonath Ray Bahadur who died in 1949). The Roy Choudhary family still prevails in Kolkata and is now well settled.

=== Dibar Dighi ===
One of the ancient and historic places of Naogaon District is Dibar Dighi. It is situated on the side of village Dibar, in Dibar Union of Patnitala Upazila.

=== Altadighi National Park ===
Altadighi National Park is situated at Dhamoirhat Upazila of this district, near the Indian border.The park was officially declared as a national park by the government of Bangladesh on 14 December 2011.It covers an area of 264.12 hectares including the largest reservoir in the Naogaon district that spans 55.46 acres.

=== Bhabanipur Zamindar Bari ===
The zamindar palace is situated in Choudhury Bhabanipur village of Shahagola Union under Atrai Upazila in Naogaon District. It is located approximately 24 kilometers south of Naogaon Sadar Upazila. The estate sits adjacent to the Bhabanipur Bazar on the banks of the Atrai River and the Chhoti Jamuna River. The Bhabanipur zamindar lineage was founded by Zamindar Girijashankar Chowdhury.

== Administration ==
Map of Naogaon District

Secretary of District Council: Vacant

Chairman of District Council:

Deputy Commissioner (DC): Mohammad Abdul Awal

=== Upazilas ===
Naogaon District upazila geocode map

The district is divided into 11 upazilas:

- Atrai Upazila
- Badalgachhi Upazila
- Dhamoirhat Upazila
- Manda Upazila
- Mohadevpur Upazila
- Naogaon Sadar Upazila
- Niamatpur Upazila
- Patnitala Upazila
- Porsha Upazila
- Raninagar Upazila
- Sapahar Upazila

== Schools ==
- Naogaon Medical College
- Jahangirpur Government College
- Naogaon Government College
- Nazipur Government College
- Sapahar Government College
- Tetulia B. M. C. College
- Agradigun ML High School
- Al-Helal Islami Academy & College
- Chak Atitha High School
- Chakuli High School
- Chandipur High School
- Fatehpur First High School
- Hapania High School And College
- Khirshin S.K. High School
- Mithapur B. L. High School
- Mohadevpur Sarba Mongala (Pilot) High School
- Naogaon K.D. Government High School
- Naogaon Zilla School
- Naogaon Government Girls’ High School
- Sapahar Pilot High School
- Saraswatipur High School
- Tilna Multilateral High School
- Nazipur Govt. Model High School
- Bhanderpur B. L High School
- Isabpur High School
- Goyeshpur high School

== Notable residents ==
- Mohammad Baitullah, deputy speaker of the Bangladesh Parliament (1972–1975)
- Gahanananda, 14th President of the Ramakrishna Order
- Talim Hossain, poet; recipient of Ekushey Padak and Bangla Academy Literary Award; founder of Nazrul Academy in Dhaka
- James, renowned singer-songwriter, guitarist, composer, and playback singer.
- Abdul Jalil, politician, Awami League activist, former Minister of Commerce (1999–2001), former Secretary of Bangladesh Awami League and founding chairman of Mercantile Bank Limited, Bangladesh
- Sadhan Chandra Majumder, politician, Minister of Food (since 2019)
- Akhtar Hameed Siddiqui, politician, former Deputy Speaker of Jatiya Sangsad (2001–2006)
- Muzaffar Rahman Chowdhury, politician, Member of East Pakistan Provincial Assembly (1946), Member of National Assembly of Pakistan (1962–1965)
- Motin Rahman, film director; recipient of National Film Award
- Emaz Uddin Pramanik, politician, former Minister of Textiles and Jute (2014–2019)
- Alamgir Kabir, politician, former State Minister of Women and Children Affairs (2006)
- Kala Pahar, Muslim general of Bengal Sultanate
- Shabnam Mustari, singer; recipient of Ekushey Padak; daughter of Talim Hossain.
- Shiran Khalji, second Muslim ruler of Bengal.
- Shibli Sadik, renowned film director; recipient of National Film Awards.

== See also ==
- Gaganpur
- Districts of Bangladesh
- Divisions of Bangladesh
- Upazilas of Bangladesh
- Administrative geography of Bangladesh
