= Board of Intermediate and Secondary Education, Rajshahi =

Coordinates: 24.373715°N 88.583136°E

- Rajshahi; Bangladesh

Information
- Established: 1961; 65 years ago
- Chairman: PROFESSOR A.N.M. MOFAKKHARUL ISLAM
- Website: rajshahiboard.gov.bd

The Board of Intermediate and Secondary Education, Rajshahi is an autonomous organization, mainly responsible for holding two public examinations (SSC & HSC) and also JSC. The Board started its operation in the year 1961.

== Background ==
Board of Intermediate and Secondary Education, Rajshahi was founded in the year 1961, which led to creation of a separate education zone in the northern Bangladesh (erstwhile East Pakistan) from administrative and educational control of the Dhaka Education Board at the Secondary and Intermediate level of education. The Governor (of East Pakistan) promulgated the ordinance of 1961 vide no. XXXIII-1961 (and its amendments No. XVI of 1962 and No. XVII of 1977), called the Intermediate and Secondary Education Ordinance 1961. The board's jurisdiction is Rajshahi Division.

== Purpose ==
The board is responsible for organization, regulation, supervision, control and development of intermediate and secondary education, holding public examinations, both Secondary School Certificate and Higher Secondary School Certificate. As an important agency of the government, board's purpose is multiple and widespread in rationalizing the vision of the govt.'s educational policy and ensuring its implementation within its assigned jurisdiction.

== District under Rajshahi Education Board ==
- Bogra District
- Chapai Nawabganj District
- Joypurhat District
- Naogaon District
- Natore District
- Pabna District
- Rajshahi District
- Sirajganj District

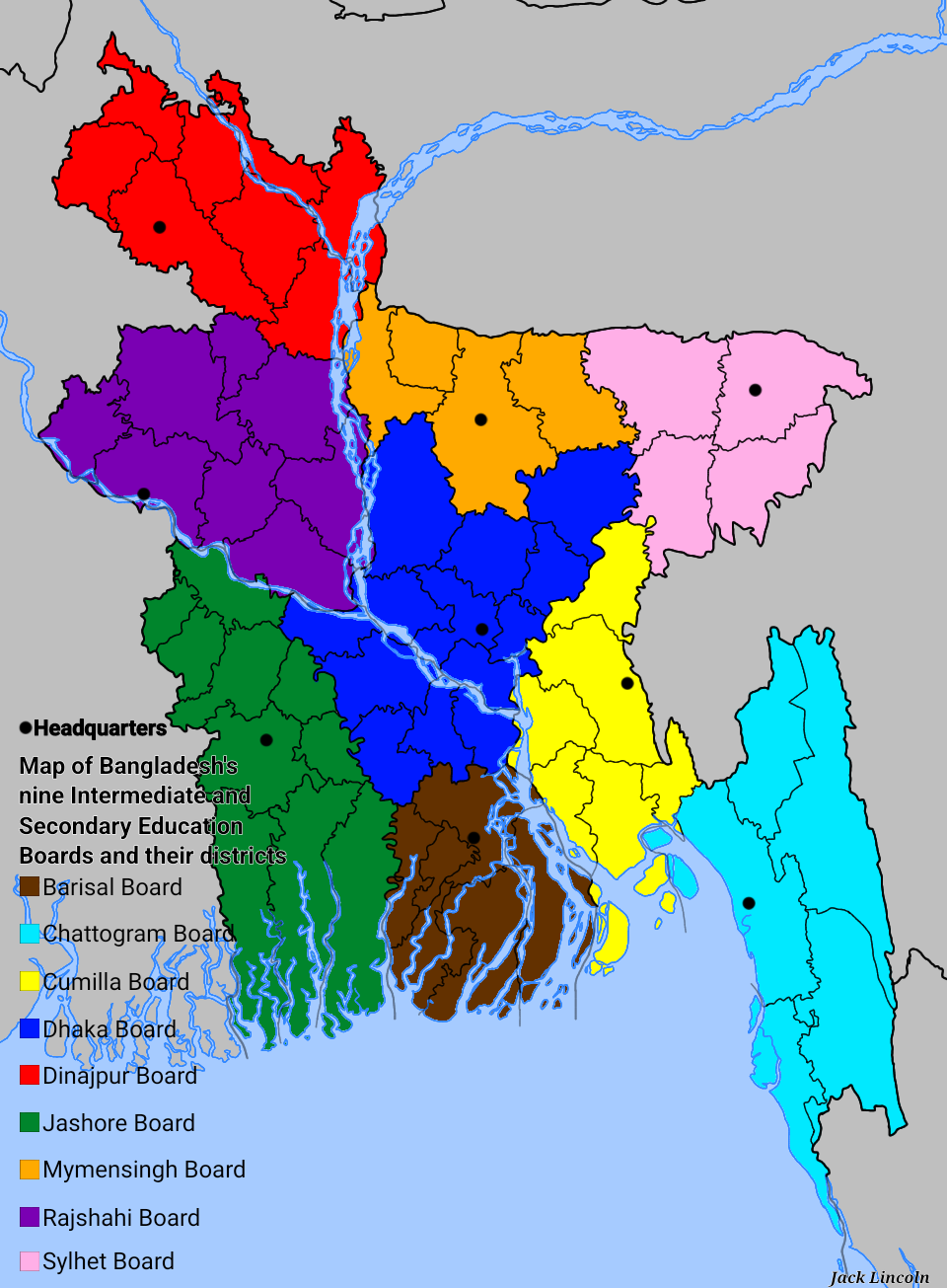
Map of Bangladesh's nine Intermediate and Secondary Education Boards and their districts

== See also ==
- List of Intermediate and Secondary Education Boards in Bangladesh
