= Naogaon Sadar Upazila =

Naogaon Sadar Upazila নওগাঁ সদর উপজেলা
- Upazila of Bangladesh
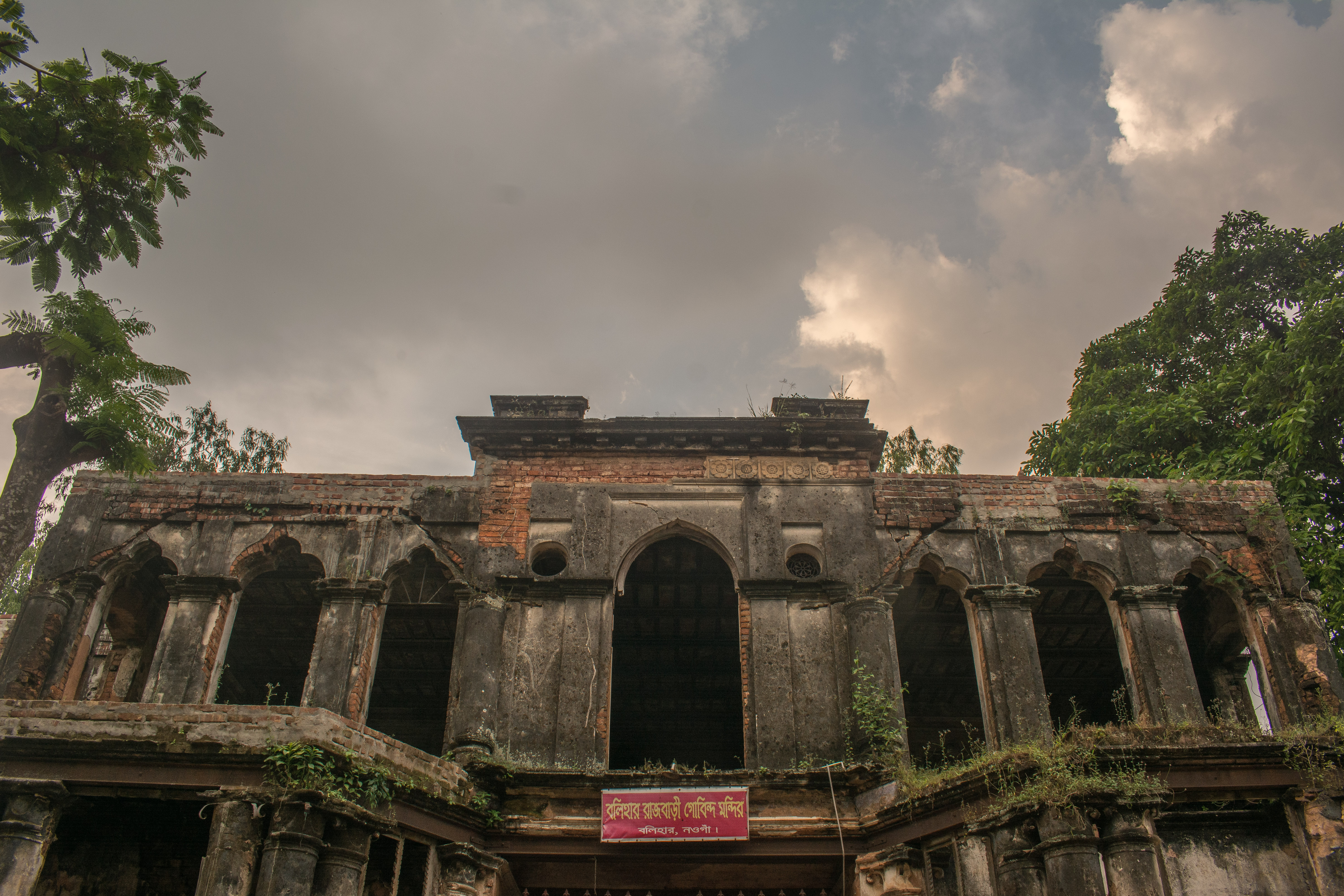
- Balihar Rajbari

- Coordinates: 24°48.3′N 88°57′E
- Country: Bangladesh
- Division: Rajshahi
- District: Naogaon
- Headquarters: Naogaon

Government
  - Type: Upazila Parishad
  - Chairman: Rafiqul Islam

Area
  - Total: 275.72 km^{2} (106.46 sq mi)

Population (2022)
  - Total: 447,903
  - Density: 1,624.5/km^{2} (4,207.4/sq mi)
- Time zone: UTC+6 (BST)
- Postal code: 6500
- Area code: 0741
- Website: Official Map of Naogaon Sadar

Naogaon Sadar Upazila mauza geocode map

Naogaon Sadar Upazila (Bengali: নওগাঁ সদর উপজেলা) is an upazila of Naogaon District in Rajshahi Division, Bangladesh.

== History ==
In British India, sub-districts were called as "Thana", which were mainly exercised by the police. When development activities became widespread, it was known as a Development Circle. In 1949, Naogaon Sadar was declared as a Thana, in 1960 as a development circle and in 1984 as a sub-district.

== Geography ==
Map of Naogaon District

Naogaon Sadar is located at 24.8042°N 88.9500°E. It has a total area of about 275.72 km^{2}. It is bounded by Badalgachhi and Mahadebpur upazilas on the north, Raninagar and Manda upazilas on the south, Adamdighi and Akkelpur upazilas on the east, Mahadebpur and Manda upazilas on the west.

== Demographics ==
Religions in Naogaon Sadar Upazila (2022)
Religion	Percent
Islam	92.42%
Hinduism	7.52%
Other or not stated	0.06%

According to the 2022 Bangladeshi census, Naogaon Sadar Upazila had 119,013 households and a population of 447,903. 7.67% of the population were under 5 years of age. Naogaon Sadar had a literacy rate (age 7 and over) of 75.36%: 77.99% for males and 72.81% for females, and a sex ratio of 97.97 males for every 100 females. 191,806 (42.82%) lived in urban areas.

According to the 2011 Census of Bangladesh, Naogaon Sadar Upazila had 100,867 households and a population of 405,148. 76,019 (18.76%) were under 10 years of age. Naogaon Sadar had a literacy rate (age 7 and over) of 53.49%, compared to the national average of 51.8%, and a sex ratio of 981 females per 1000 males. 150,549 (37.16%) lived in urban areas. Ethnic population was 1,303 (0.32%)

== Administration ==
Naogaon Sadar Upazila is divided into Naogaon Municipality and 12 union parishads: Baktiarpur, Balihar, Barshail, Boalia, Chandipur, Dubalhati, Hapania, Hashaighari, Kirtipur, Sailgachhi, Shikarpur, and Tilakpur. The union parishads are subdivided into 237 mouzas and 211 villages.

- Upazila Parishad Chairman: Rafiqul Islam
- MP of Naogaon-5 Constituencies: Barrister Nizam Uddin Jalil John
- Mayor of Naogaon Municipality: Nazmul Haque Sony

== Education ==
According to Banglapedia, Chak Atitha High School, founded in 1914, and Kirtipur Multilateral High School, founded in 1921, are notable secondary schools in the upazila. Other educational institutions include Hapania High School And College, which was established in 1965.

== See also ==
- Upazilas of Bangladesh
- Districts of Bangladesh
- Divisions of Bangladesh
- Administrative geography of Bangladesh
