= Naogaon =

Municipality and town in Rajshahi Division

Naogaon নওগাঁ
- City
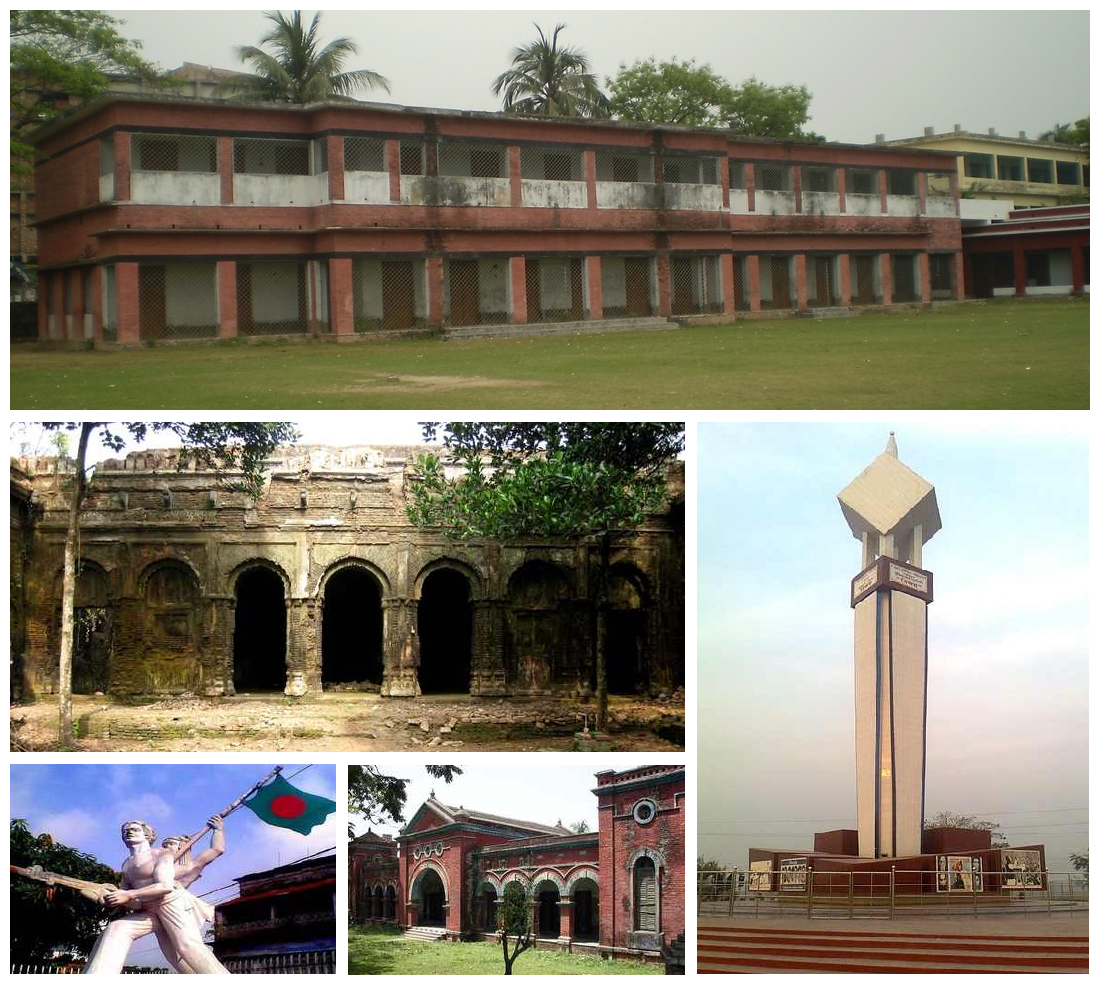
- Clockwise from top: Naogaon K.D. Government High School, Bijoy Monument, Gaza Society office, Shadhinota Monument and Balihar Royal Palace.

- Location in Bangladesh Naogaon (Bangladesh)
- Coordinates: 24°49′N 88°56′E
- Country: Bangladesh
- Division: Rajshahi
- District: Naogaon
- Upazila: Naogaon Sadar
- Granted municipality status: 1963

Government
  - Type: Municipal government
  - Mayor: Nazmul Haque Sony

Area
  - City: 38.36 km^{2} (14.81 sq mi)
  - Metro: 275.72 km^{2} (106.46 sq mi)
- Elevation: 19 m (62 ft)

Population (2022)
  - City: 178,635
  - Density: 4,657/km^{2} (12,060/sq mi)
- Time zone: UTC+6 (Bangladesh Time)
- Postal code: 6500
- Website: naogaonpoura.com

Naogaon (Bengali: নওগাঁ) is a city on the banks of the little Jamuna river in the Rajshahi Division. It is the headquarters of the Naogaon District and the Naogaon Sadar Upazila. According to the 2022 Bangladeshi census the population of Naogaon City is 178,635, which makes it the 29th largest city in Bangladesh.

== History ==
In 1961, the urban population was 20,276. Naogaon was made a municipality in 1963. By 1974, the population had grown to 34,395.

== Education ==
Naogaon Government College, established in 1962, is situated in the north-eastern part of the town.

== Demographics ==
Religions in Naogaon Paurashava (2022)
Religion	Percent
Islam	89.33%
Hinduism	10.55%
Other or not stated	0.12%

According to the 2022 Bangladesh census, Naogaon city had 46,797 households and a population of 178,649. Naogaon had a literacy rate of 83.18%: 85.28% for males and 81.07% for females, and a sex ratio of 100.58 males per 100 females. 7.29% of the population was under 5 years of age.

According to the 2011 Bangladesh census, Naogaon city had 35,923 households and a population of 150,549. 26,164 (17.38%) were under 10 years of age. Naogaon had a literacy rate (age 7 and over) of 65.12%, compared to the national average of 51.8%, and a sex ratio of 947 females per 1000 males.
