= North Bengal =

Northern part of Bengal covering India and Bangladesh

Coordinates: 25.55°N 88.83°E

North Bengal (Bengali: উত্তর বাংলা or, উত্তর বঙ্গ; Uttor Bangla, Uttor Bongo) is a cross-border cultural–geographic region consisting of the north-western regions of Bangladesh as well as the northern portion of the West Bengal state of India. Bounded to the east by the Jamuna and in the south by the Padma, it roughly consists of the Rajshahi and Rangpur Divisions of Bangladesh, as well as the Jalpaiguri and most of the Malda Division of the Indian state of West Bengal (often excluding Murshidabad). Under a broader sense it can also include adjacent areas considered culturally or geographically part of Bengal, such as Mahananda River basin. Within the context of Bangladesh, this region is also referred to as Uttoranchal (the northern region) or Uttor Bangladesh (Northern Bangladesh).

It is roughly coterminous with the historical region of Barind (Varendra), which gives its name to the Barind Tract, located within this region.

== Administrative regions ==
=== In Bangladesh ===
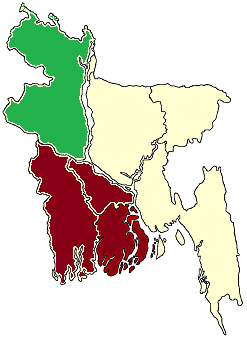
Map of Bangladesh showing North Bengal in green and South Bengal in red.

Rajshahi Division	Rangpur Division
Bogra District; Chapainawabganj District; Joypurhat District; Naogaon District; Natore District; Pabna District; Rajshahi District; Sirajganj District	Dinajpur District; Gaibandha District; Kurigram District; Lalmonirhat District; Nilphamari District; Panchagarh District; Rangpur District; Thakurgaon District

=== In West Bengal, India ===
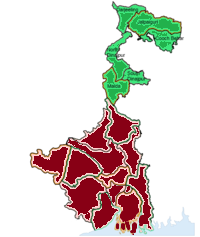
Map of West Bengal showing North Bengal in green and South Bengal in red.

Jalpaiguri Division	Malda Division
Darjeeling district; Kalimpong district; Jalpaiguri district; Alipurduar district; Cooch Behar district	Malda district; Uttar Dinajpur district; Dakshin Dinajpur district; Murshidabad district (usually excluded)

== Demographics ==
=== Religion ===
Combined religious makeup of North Bengal, based on the Indian and Bangladeshi census of 2011 and 2022, respectively:
1. Islam (71.7%)
2. Hinduism (26.6%)
3. Others (1.70%)

==== In Bangladesh ====
Religion in North Bengal, Bangladesh (2022)
Muslim	90.3%
Hindu	9.1%
Others	0.6%

The population of the region is 37,962,820 (3.79 crore) as per the 2022 census. The majority of the population follows Islam, with Hinduism being the largest minority.

==== In West Bengal, India ====
Religion in North Bengal, India (2011)
Hindu	65.32%
Muslim	30.39%
Christianity	2.25%
Buddhism	1.52%
Others	0.52%

The population of the region is 18,702,060 (1.87 crore) as per the 2011 census. The majority of the population follows Hinduism, with Muslims being the largest minority. A small but significant population follow Christianity and Buddhism.

=== Language ===
Bengali is the predominant language spoken by 75% of the population in North Bengal, followed by Kamtapuri (Rajbanshi), Nepali, Hindi, Sadri, Kurukh and other languages.

== In sports ==
The North Zone cricket team in Bangladesh is a first-class cricket team that represents northern Bangladesh (Rajshahi and Rangpur) in the Bangladesh Cricket League.

== Cities and towns ==
=== Bangladesh ===
- Rajshahi, is a metropolitan city and the district headquarters of Rajshahi district and the divisional capital of Rajshahi division. Rajshahi is the biggest city in all of North Bengal. The city has an excellent railway transport system.
- Rangpur, is a metropolitan city located in the Rangpur District. It is the headquarters of Rangpur Division. It is one of the oldest and yet modern cities in Bangladesh.
- Bogra, is a major city located in the Bogra district, Rajshahi Division, Bangladesh. Bogra is considered the oldest city of Bengal, dating to the reign of the Great Emperor Ashoka, who ruled India from 268 to 232 BCE.
- Sirajganj, is an important city situated on the bank of Jamuna River. Sirajganj District is known as the gateway to North Bengal.
- Pabna, is the district headquarters of Pabna district. It is an important city situated on the bank of Padma River.
- Ishwardi, is a city in Pabna District. An important junction of the western zone of Bangladesh Railway. The only Nuclear Power Plant of Bangladesh is situated here.
- Joypurhat Sadar, is the capital of Joypurhat District. Joypurhat Sugar Mill's Limited is the largest autonomous sugar mill in Bangladesh which is in this city. Pagla Dewan Boddhovumi is one of Bangladesh's most important monuments.
- Natore, is the North Bengal capital and headquarter of Natore District. Uttara Ganabhaban is located near Natore town in North Bengal. On 24 July 1967, it was designated as a gubernatorial residence by Abdul Monem Khan the governor of East Pakistan. After the independence of Bangladesh prime minister Sheikh Mujibur Rahman declared the place as his official residence in Northern Bangladesh on 9 February 1972.
- Tetulia, is a town in Tetulia Upazila. It is the northernmost town in Bangladesh. Banglabandha, a major inland port in northern Bangladesh established to provide a trade link with India, Nepal and Bhutan, being the northernmost point of Bangladesh, is situated here.
- Panchagarh, is the northernmost city of Bangladesh. It has beautiful tea gardens.
- Chapainawabganj Sadar, is the district headquarters of Chapainawabganj District, the westernmost town in Bangladesh. It is called the capital of the mango in Bangladesh because it is this summer fruit that is the main product that sustains the economy of Chapainawabganj District. Most of the land of this district is full of mango orchards where various kinds of mango are produced. The economy is surrounded by the production of the mango.
- Naogaon, is the district headquarters of Naogaon District. It is in the central part of the historical Varendra region of Bengal. Naogaon District is the top listed district in the side of rice production and has the highest number of rice processing mills of any district in Bangladesh. Naogaon District is considered the bread basket of Bangladesh.
- Dinajpur, is a city in Dinajpur District. Kantajew Temple, a late-medieval Hindu temple is one of the most beautiful Hindu temples in northern Bengal in this city. The percentage of literacy in the city is 85.05% which is quite high compared with that of other cities in Bangladesh.
- Gaibandha, is the district headquarters of Gaibandha District.
- Kurigram, is the district headquarters of Kurigram district.
- Lalmonirhat, is the district headquarters of Lalmonirhat district.
- Nilphamari, is the district headquarters of Nilphamari district.
- Thakurgaon, is a city and the district headquarters of Thakurgaon district.
- Boda, is a municipal town in Panchagarh District. It is one of the northernmost towns in Bangladesh. It is named Boda because a notable temple, known as Bordeshwari Temple is located there.
- Adamdighi
- Birganj
- Sherpur
- Dhunat
- Dhupchanchia
- Gabtali
- Kahaloo
- Nandigram
- Shajahanpur
- Sariakandi
- Shibganj, Bogra
- Sonatala
- Bholahat
- Gomastapur
- Nachole
- Shibganj, Chapainawabganj
- Akkelpur
- Kalai
- Khetlal
- Panchbibi
- Atrai
- Badalgachhi
- Dhamoirhat
- Manda
- Mohadevpur
- Niamatpur
- Porsha
- Patnitala
- Raninagar
- Sapahar
- Bagatipara
- Baraigram
- Gurudaspur
- Lalpur
- Naldanga
- Singra
- Atgharia
- Bera
- Bhangura
- Chatmohar
- Faridpur, Pabna (Formerly Banwari Nagar)
- Santhia
- Sujanagar
- Bagha
- Bagmara
- Charghat
- Durgapur, Rajshahi
- Godagari
- Mohanpur
- Paba
- Pirganj
- Puthia
- Tanore

=== West Bengal, India ===
- Siliguri, is the largest city of North Bengal and its commercial and transport hub. University of North Bengal is situated at Raja Rammohanpur and North Bengal Medical College and Hospital are situated at Sushrutanagar in this town. Lying, about 35 kilometres (22 mi) from one another, Siliguri and Jalpaiguri both merge up to be the largest metropolis of the region.
- Algarah
- Alipurduar, is the main commercial town of the Eastern Dooars region. Now Alipurduar is a new district.
- Bagdogra
- Balurghat, is the headquarters of Dakshin Dinajpur district of West Bengal.
- Banarhat
- Buniadpur, is a newly planned municipal city, a census town & a sub-divisionisnal's headquarter in Dakshin Dinajpur district in North Bengal in the state of West Bengal, India.
- Chalsa
- Cooch Behar, was once home to the famous Cooch Behar kingdom. The North Bengal State Transport Corporation operates its services from all over the region. It has its headquarters here. It also features the North Bengal State Library.
- Dalkhola, is a commercial town, business hub, and 4th largest railway station in North Bengal.
- Darjeeling, is the largest hill town in the region. It was once the summer capital of Bengal.
- Dhupguri, is one of the most flourishing cities of the region, due to its significant location.
- Dinhata
- Falakata
- Farakka
- Gangarampur
- Gorubathan
- Haldibari
- Hasimara
- Islampur
- Itahar
- Jaldhaka
- Jalpaiguri, once the most important town and the home to the tea industry and the headquarters of the Jalpaiguri division of West Bengal. The city is home to the Circuit Bench of the Kolkata High Court and features the newly built-up Jalpaiguri Medical College. Lying, about 35 kilometres (22 mi) from one another, Siliguri and Jalpaiguri both merge up to be the largest metropolis of the region.
- Kalimpong, is a hill station of the region. It is the 21st district of West Bengal.
- Kurseong, is another hill station of the region.
- Kaliaganj, is a municipality and census town in Uttar Dinajpur district, North Bengal in the state of West Bengal, India.
- Labha
- Madarihat
- Maharaja Hat
- Maynaguri, is also one of the most important towns in North Bengal, which is situated at the junction of several cities and connects Jalpaiguri, Malbazar, Dhupguri, Mathabhanga, Changrabandha, etc. with one other. It is also one of the most important business locations and is known as the 'Gateway to the Dooars'.
- Malbazar, is one of the most important towns of North Bengal and is known for its scenic beauty and tea gardens around.
- Malda, English Bazar or mainly known as Malda is the second-largest city in the region and the most important commercial city. It is the headquarters of Malda division. The University of Gour Banga and Malda Medical College and Hospital are situated in this town. Malda Town railway station which is the second busiest station in this region, after New Jalpaiguri.
- Matigara
- Mekliganj
- Mirik
- Naxalbari, is a small hamlet in the Darjeeling district. It is the place from where the Naxalite movement draws its name and was the scene of the first Naxal agitation.
- Pedong
- Phulbari
- Raiganj, is the district headquarters of Uttar Dinajpur.
- Rambi Bazar
- Teesta Bazaar
- Totopara, is a small village in Alipurduar district, and home to one of the last remaining ethnic tribes of the regions – the Totos.
- Tufanganj, is a city and municipality of Cooch Behar district and one of the most commercial cities in this region. A mental hospital is situated in this town and it is also known as the "Gateway of Assam".

== See also ==
- Mithila
- South Bengal
