= Tilakpur railway station =

Railway station in Joypurhat District, Bangladesh

Tilakpur তিলকপুর

General information
- Location: Tilakpur, Joypurhat District; Bangladesh
- Coordinates: 24.8769°N 89.0018°E
- Owner: Bangladesh Railway
- Line: Chilahati–Parbatipur–Santahar–Darshana line

Construction
- Structure type: Standard (on ground station)
Location

Tilakpur railway station is an intermediate station in Akkelpur Upazila of Joypurhat District, Bangladesh.

The north-south railway line between Chilahati and Sara (on the Padma River near Paksey) was constructed between 1874 and 1879. Tilakpur station is 6 miles (9.7 km) south of Akkelpur and 5 miles (8.0 km) north of Santahar Junction.

By 1892, a new station building at Tilakpur was in progress or complete. The "low, squat building" was undamaged by the 1897 Assam earthquake.

Sometime between 2008 and 2014, the station closed due a manpower shortage at Bangladesh Railway. It remained closed in November, 2020.

By early 2023 the station had reopened, and late that year was being renovated.

== See also ==
- Joypurhat railway station
- Santahar railway station
