= Patharghata (archaeological site) =

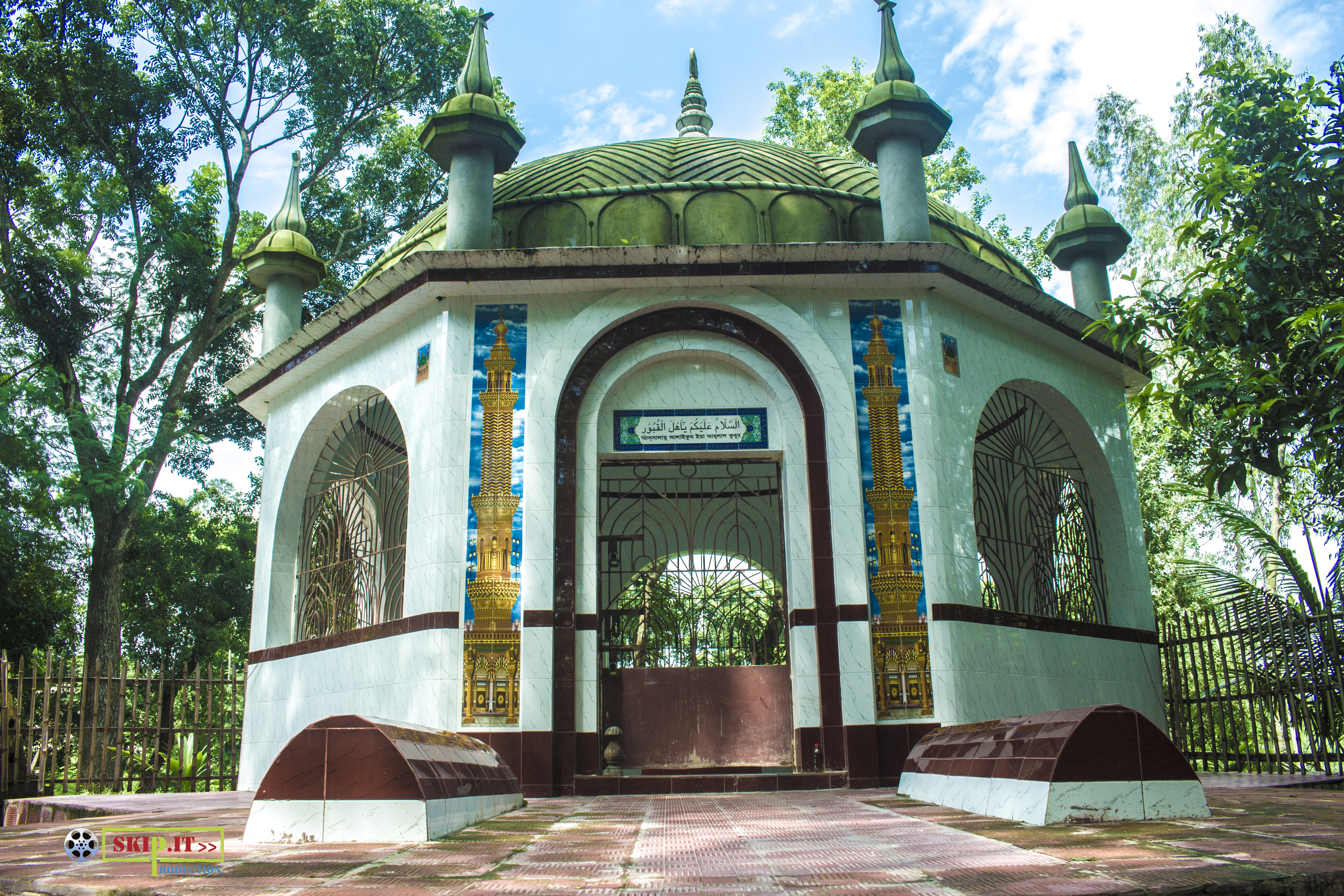
- Type: Archaeological Site
- Location: Panchbibi Upazila
- Area: Joypurhat District
- Owner: Department of Archaeology (Bangladesh)

Patharghata is an ancient city and one of the most important archeological sites in Bangladesh located in Joypurhat district. It is located at Patharghata in Panchbibi upazila of the district. The Patharghata site is the site of several archeological sites. It is situated on the bank of the river Tulsiganga, 1.5 km east of the upazila headquarters. Traces of the ruins of this ancient city are found on both banks of the Tulsiganga River.

== History ==
The total area of the archeological site is about 4 square kilometers. During excavation, the ruins of an archeological ancient bridge over the Tulsiganga River have been found. During the construction of Catholic missions and adjacent areas, archeological sites have been found in various mounds and numerous artifacts. Among the archaeological installations here are: Mission, Uchai, Bahrampur, Kasia Ghar, Kusumba, Gangaria and several mounds of Brahigram and Nimai Shah's shrine, Badar Kadam, Santal Para.

In addition, excavations, ancient brick fragments, terracotta objects, and more have been discovered as a result of excavations. There are also iron blocks, antique coins, glass fragments, theft and many other necessities.

Similar pieces of pottery of the third-second century have also been found in present-day Pakistan. Many people think that the city probably originated in the first or second century CE. As such, the age of the region may be 2,000 years or more. Apart from the Ages, many traces of the Gupta and Palas have been discovered here. There is also a shrine of the Sultanate era known to the locals as the shrine of Nimai Pir.

The description of various foreign archaeologists is also known to have been found in the area during the Christian fourth-fifth-century Gupta period and from the 8th century to the twelfth-century AD. ancient city is believed to have been the center of art and culture for many different ages.

== Gallery ==
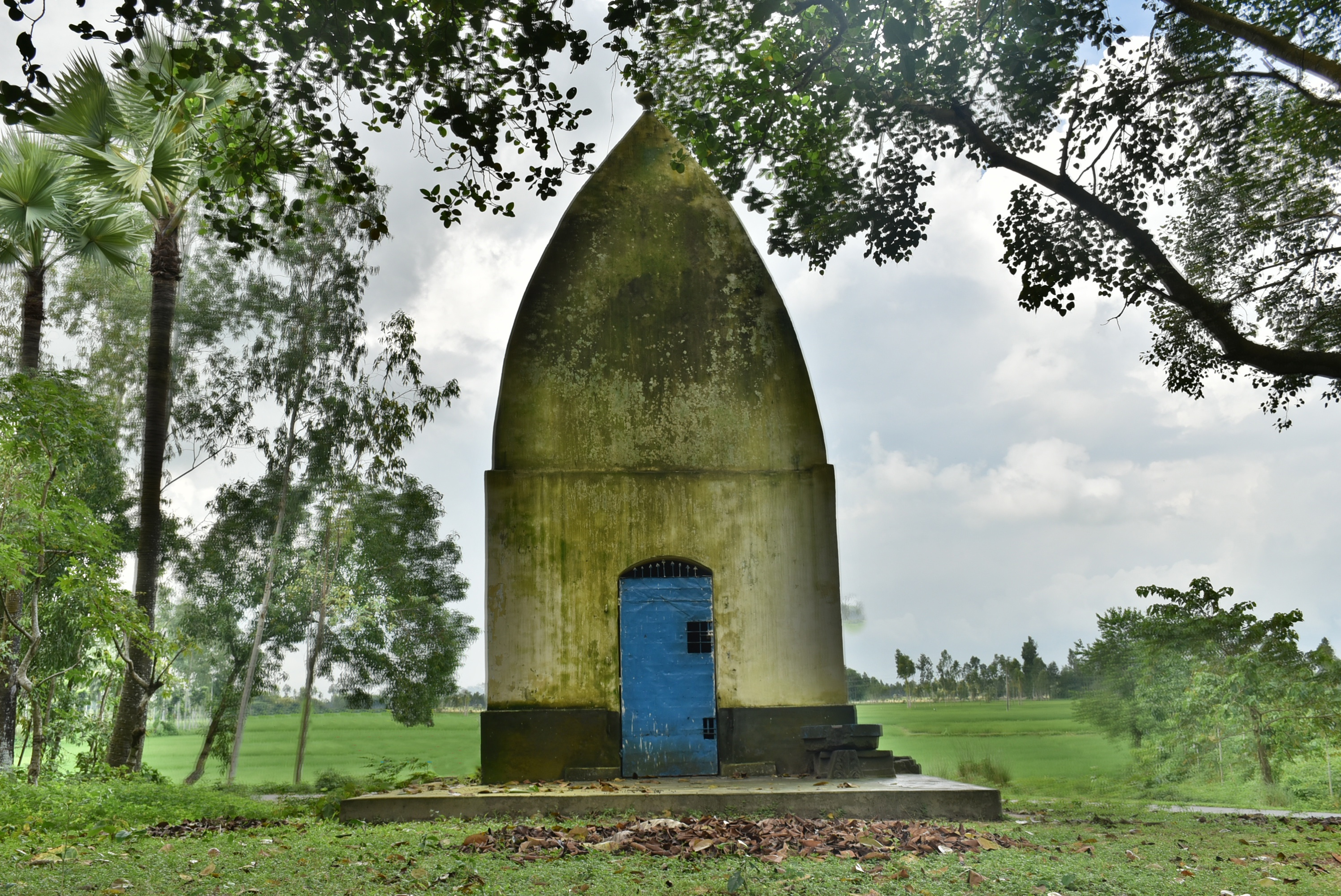

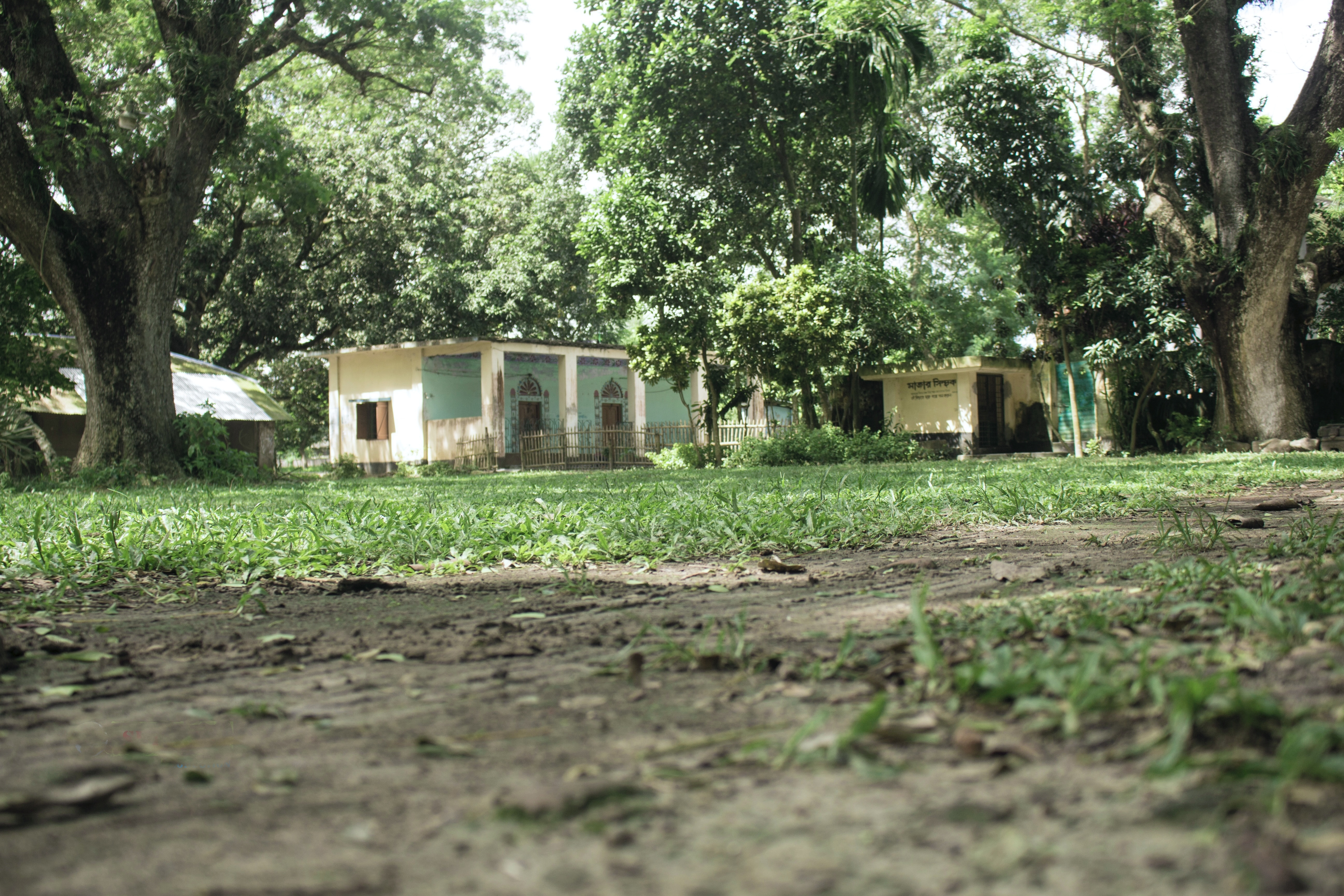

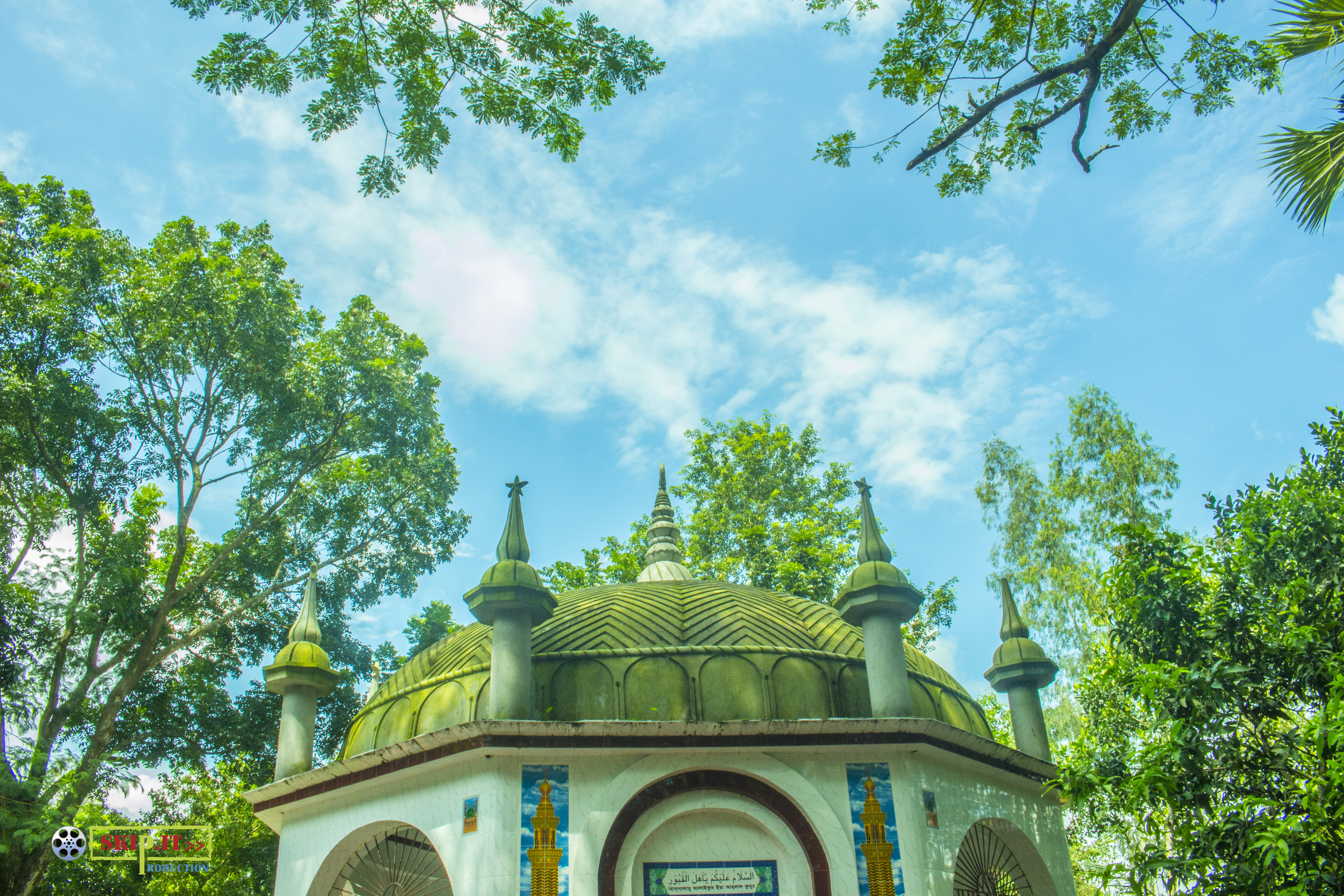

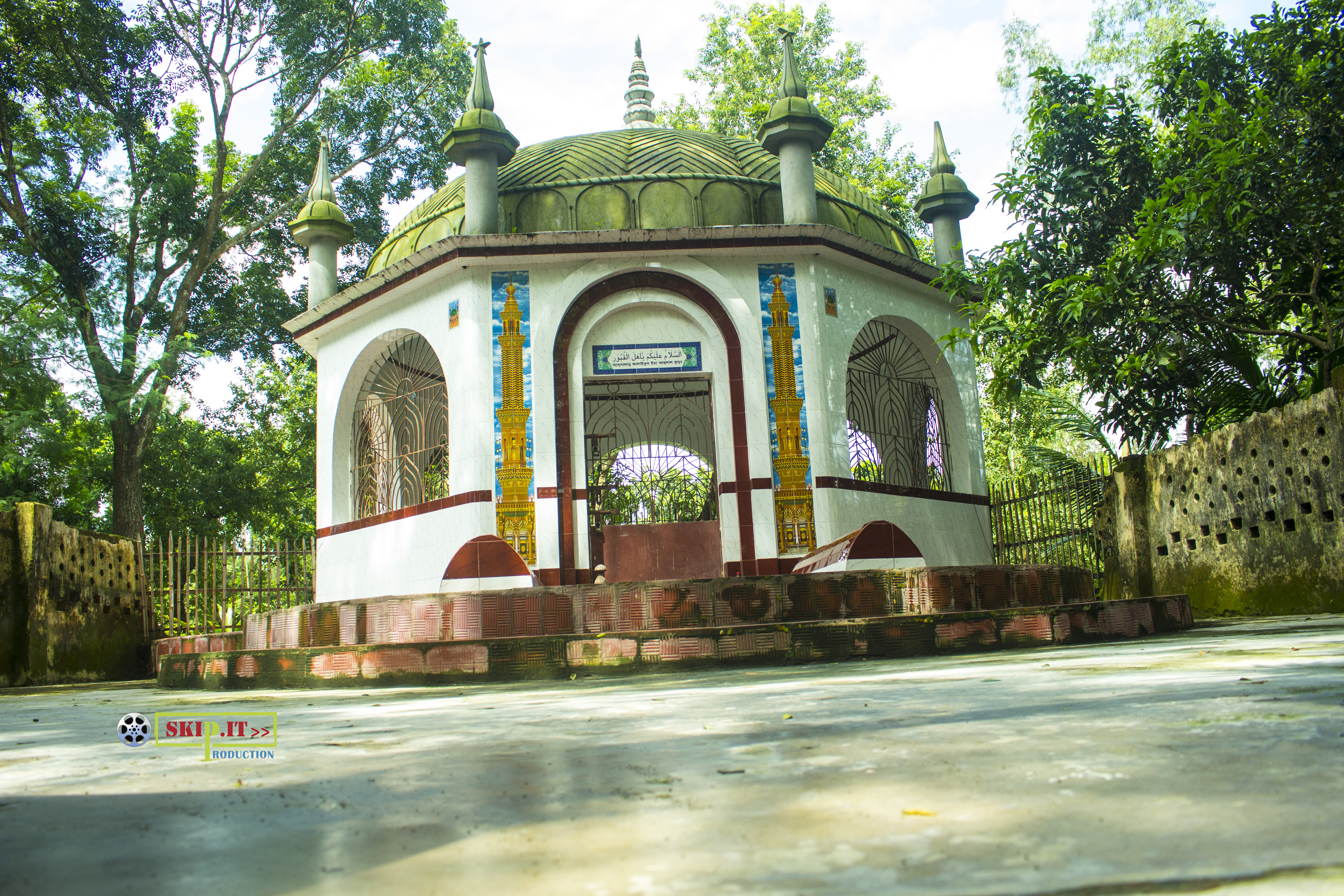

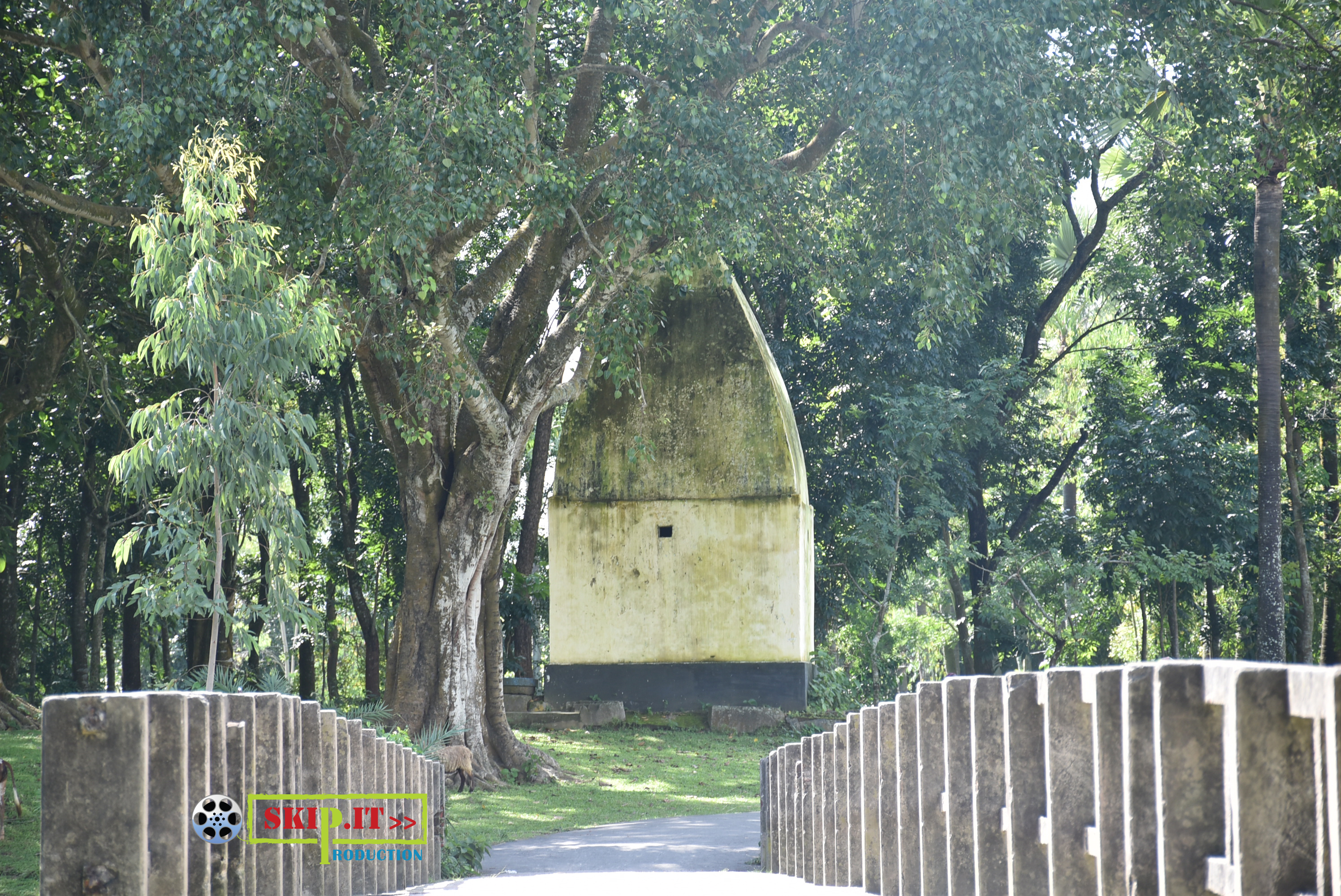
