= Chiri River =

Coordinates: 25.1634°N 88.9875°E

- Native name: চিরি নদী (Bengali)

Location
- Country: Bangladesh
- Division: Rajshahi
- District: Joypurhat
- Region: South Asia

The Chiri River (Bengali: চিরি নদী) is a river in the northern part of Bangladesh. It passes through Joypurhat District in the Rajshahi Division. It is 21.70 kilometres (13.48 mi) long and 15 metres (49 ft) wide. By 2019, the river had silted up to such an extent that it had been converted to cropland, mostly for rice. At that time a project to dredge the river, and three other rivers, the Chhota Jamuna, Tulshiganga, Haraboti, was awaiting approval.
