= Jafarpur railway station =

Railway station in Joypurhat District, Bangladesh

Coordinates: 24.922062°N 89.015136°E

Jafarpur জাফরপুর

General information
- Location: Joypurhat District; Bangladesh
- Owner: Bangladesh Railway

Construction
- Structure type: Standard (on ground station)
Location

Jafarpur railway station is a railway station in Joypurhat, Rajshahi Division, Bangladesh.

== See also ==
- Joypurhat railway station
- Santahar railway station
