= Tilakpur (disambiguation) =

Tilakpur may refer to these topics-

- Tilakpur: a village Development Community in Nepal
- Tilokpur: a village of Uttar Pradesh, India
- Tilakpur railway station: Tilakpur railway station is a railway station in Akkelpur upazila of joypurhat district. Tilakpur is also a union parishad of Akkelpur upazila
