= Sree River =

Coordinates: 25.1706°N 88.9229°E

- Native name: শ্রী নদী (Bengali)

Location
- Country: Bangladesh
- Region: Rajshahi Division
- District: Joypurhat

The Sree River (Bengali: শ্রী নদী) is a river in the northern part of Bangladesh (commonly known as North Bengal). It passes through Joypurhat Sadar and Akkelpur Upazilas of Joypurhat District.
