= Begungram =

Village in Bangladesh

Coordinates: 25°02′13″N 89°10′32″E

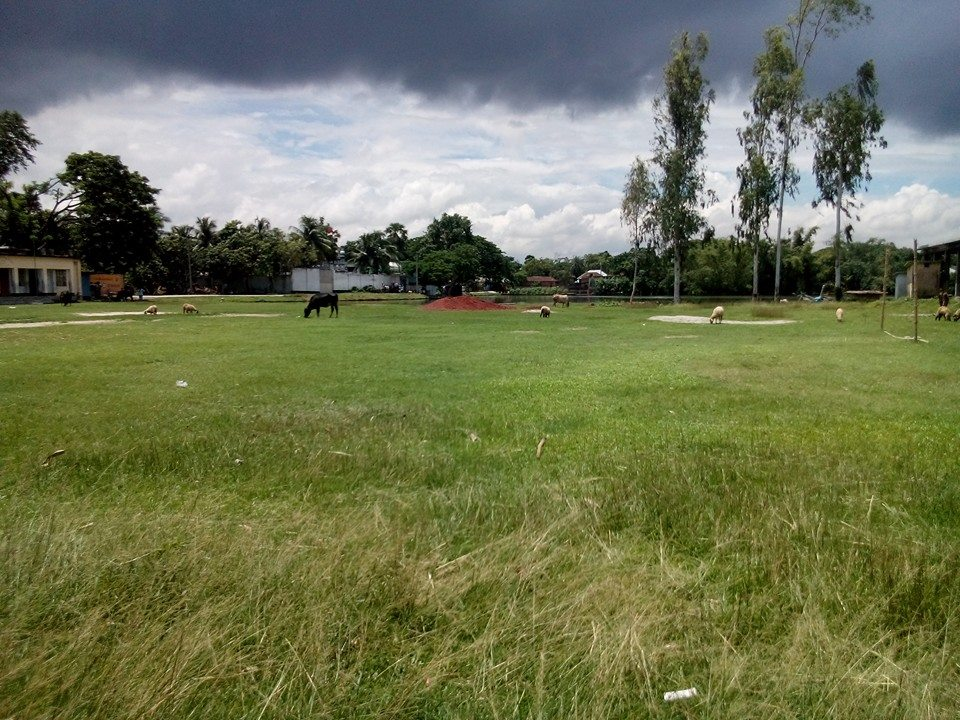
Field at Begungram

Begungram (Bengali: বেগুনগ্রাম) is a village in Kalai Upazila of Joypurhat District in north-western Bangladesh.

It is the site of the largest annual Nabanna (harvest festival) in northern Bangladesh.

At the northern end of the village is a mazar (shrine) over the grave of Khwaja Abdul Gafur Chishti, who died in Begungram in 1974.

The madrasa education system includes one fazil madrasa, the private Begungram Chasmaye Ulum B.L. Sr. Fazil Madrasah.
