= Haraboti River =

River in Bangladesh

Coordinates: 25.1017°N 89.1576°E

- Native name: হারাবতি নদী (Bengali)

Location
- Country: Bangladesh
- Division: Rajshahi
- District: Joypurhat

The Haraboti River (Bengali: হারাবতি নদী) is a river in the northern part of Bangladesh (commonly known as North Bengal). It passes through Joypurhat District. The siltation of the river has led to discussions to dredge the Haraboti, and three other rivers, the Chiri, Chhota Jamuna and Tulshiganga.
