= Akkelpur railway station =

Railway station in Joypurhat District, Bangladesh

Akkelpur আক্কেলপুর

General information
- Location: Akkelpur, Joypurhat District; Bangladesh
- Coordinates: 24°57′54″N 89°00′57″E
- Owner: Bangladesh Railway

Construction
- Structure type: Standard (on ground station)
Location

Akkelpur railway station is a railway station in Akkelpur, Joypurhat District, Rajshahi Division, Bangladesh.

== See also ==
- Joypurhat District
- Joypurhat railway station
- Bangladesh Railway
- Santahar railway station
- Kamalapur railway station
