= Panchbibi railway station =

Railway station in Joypurhat District, Bangladesh

Panchbibi পাঁচবিবি
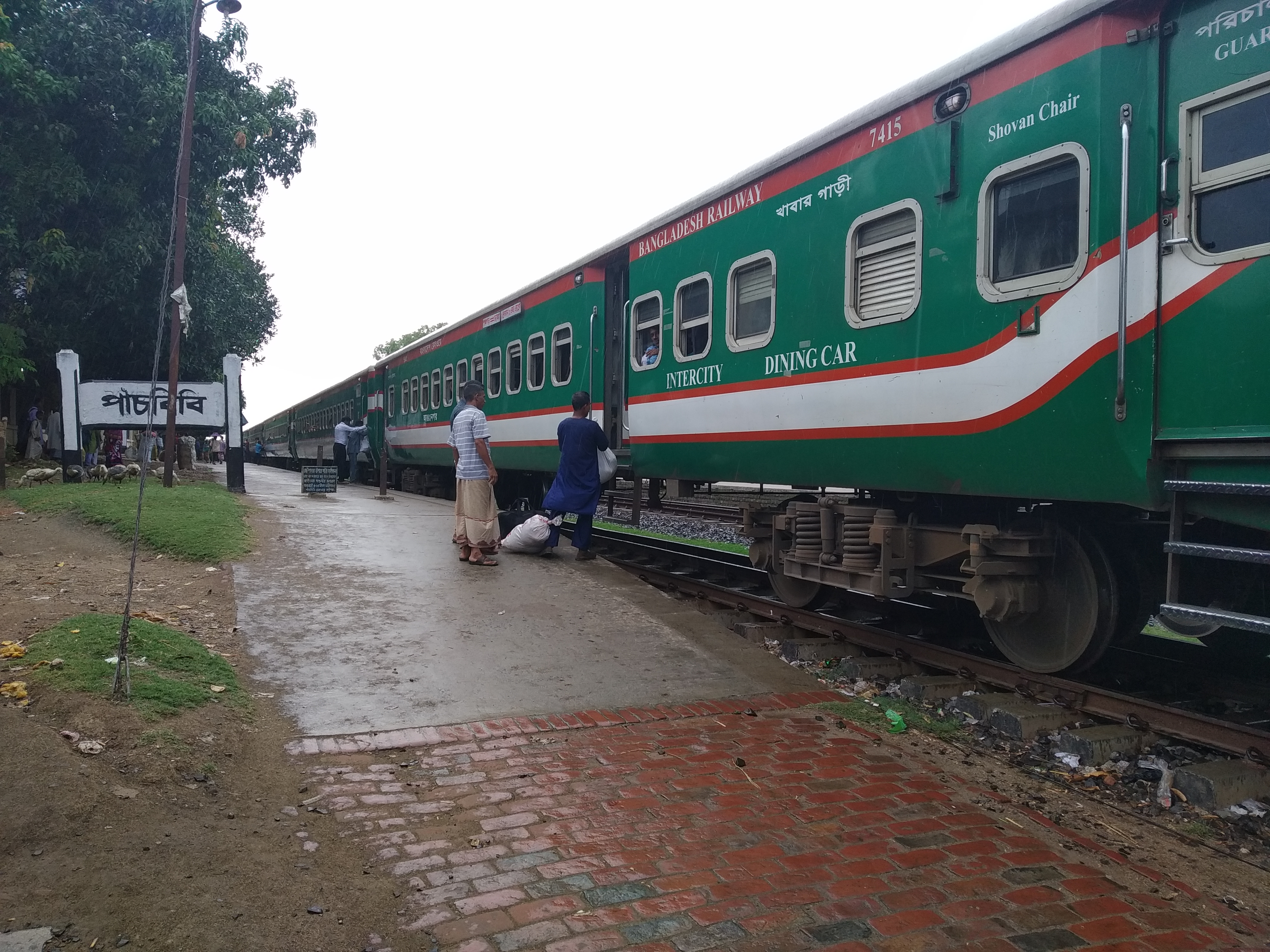
- Drutajan Express at Panchbibi Station

General information
- Location: Joypurhat District; Bangladesh
- Coordinates: 25.1891°N 89.0213°E
- Owner: Bangladesh Railway
- Line: Chilahati–Parbatipur–Santahar–Darshana line
- Platforms: 2

Construction
- Structure type: Standard (on ground station)
Location

Panchbibi railway station is an intermediate station in Panchbibi Upazila of Joypurhat District, Bangladesh.

The north–south railway line between Chilahati and Sara (on the Padma River near Paksey) was constructed between 1874 and 1879. Panchbibi station is 4 miles (6.4 km) south of Hili and 7 miles (11 km) north of Joypurhat.

In 2011, Bangladesh Railway suspended intercity rail service to the station, which is near the border with India, to curb smuggling. In 2015, local residents demanded that all intercity trains resume stopping at Panchbibi.
