= Bagjana railway station =

Railway station in Joypurhat District, Bangladesh

Bagjana বাগজানা

General information
- Location: Joypurhat District; Bangladesh
- Coordinates: 25.2406°N 89.0125°E
- Owner: Bangladesh Railway

Construction
- Structure type: Standard (on ground station)
Location
- Location within Bangladesh Rajshahi division Location within Bangladesh

Bagjana railway station is a railway station in Joypurhat District, Rajshahi Division, Bangladesh.

== See also ==
- Bangladesh Railway
- Chilahati–Parbatipur–Santahar–Darshana line
- Joypurhat railway station
- Santahar railway station
