= Ahsanganj railway station =

Railway station in Naogaon, Bangladesh

Ahsanganj আহসানগঞ্জ
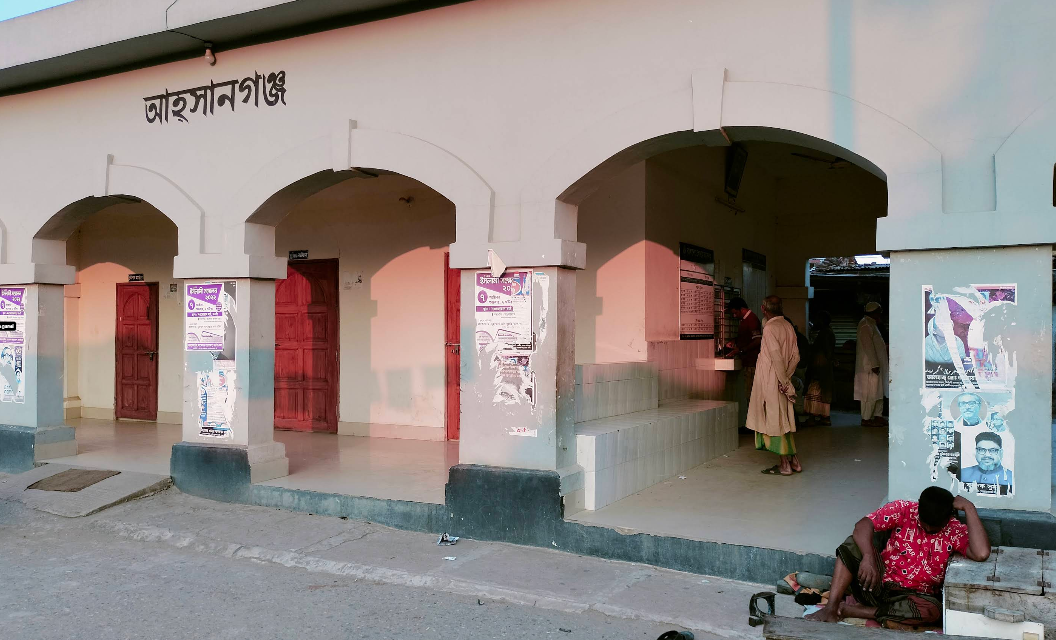

General information
- Location: Atrai, Naogaon; Bangladesh
- Coordinates: 24.6140°N 88.9751°E
- Owner: Bangladesh Railway
- Line: Chilahati-Parbatipur-Santahar-Darshana Line

Construction
- Structure type: Standard (on ground station)

Other information
- Status: Active
Location

Ahsanganj railway station (Bengali: আহসানগঞ্জ রেলওয়ে স্টেশন) is a railway station in Naogaon District, Rajshahi Division, Bangladesh. Jamindar Munshi Ahsanullah Mollah M.L.C established the station and then the station was named as the Atrai Ghat in the time of British rule but it was renamed after Munshi Ahsanullah Mollah (Founder) as Ahsanganj railway station. Then the station was built again by Mollah Abul Kalam Azad MP (Son of Munshi Ahsanullah Mollah). Currently, there are some minor and major train stops at this railway station.

== See also ==
- Bangladesh Railway
- Santahar railway station
- Atrai Upazila
