= Joypurhat Sadar Upazila =

Joypurhat Sadar Upazila জয়পুরহাট সদর উপজেলা
- Upazila of Bangladesh
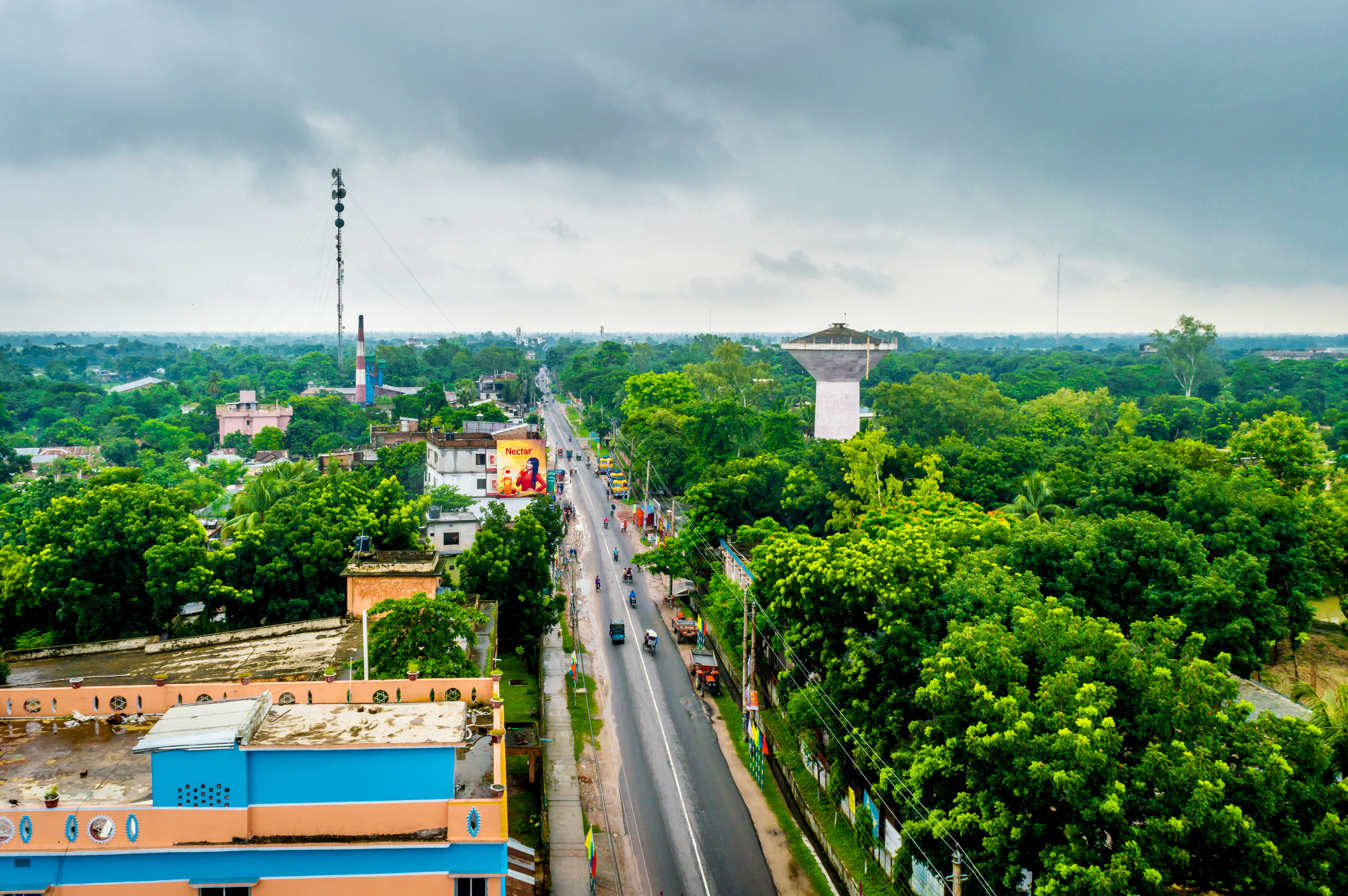
- View of Joypurhat

- Coordinates: 25°06′N 89°02′E
- Country: Bangladesh
- Division: Rajshahi
- District: Joypurhat

Area
  - Total: 236.79 km^{2} (91.43 sq mi)

Population (2022)
  - Total: 315,205
  - Density: 1,331.2/km^{2} (3,447.7/sq mi)
- Time zone: UTC+6 (BST)
- Postal code: 5900
- Area code: 0571
- Website: joypurhatsadar.joypurhat.gov.bd

Joypurhat Sadar Upazila mauza geocode map

Joypurhat Sadar Upazila (Bengali: জয়পুরহাট সদর উপজেলা) is an upazila of Joypurhat District in the Division of Rajshahi, Bangladesh.

== Geography ==
Joypurhat Sadar is located at 25°06′N 89°02′E. It has 76,385 households and total area 238.54 km^{2}.

Joypurhat Sadar Upazila is bounded by Panchbibi Upazila and Balurghat CD Block in Dakshin Dinajpur district, West Bengal, India, on the north, Kalai and Khetlal Upazilas on the east, Khetlal, Akkelpur and Badalgachhi Upazilas on the south and Dhamoirhat Upazila and Balurghat CD Block on the west.

== Demographics ==
Religions in Joypurhat Sadar Upazila (2022)
Religion	Percent
Islam	88.69%
Hinduism	10.47%
Other or not stated	0.84%

According to the 2022 Bangladeshi census, Joypurhat Sadar Upazila had 86,499 households and a population of 315,205. 7.40% of the population were under 5 years of age. Joypurhat Sadar had a literacy rate (age 7 and over) of 76.80%: 79.60% for males and 73.99% for females, and a sex ratio of 100.55 males for every 100 females. 96,969 (30.76%) lived in urban areas. Ethnic population was 9290 (2.95%), of which Barman are 1952 and Oraon are 1509.

According to the 2011 Census of Bangladesh, Joypurhat Sadar Upazila had 76,385 households and a population of 289,058. 51,683 (17.88%) were under 10 years of age. Joypurhat Sadar had a literacy rate (age 7 and over) of 65.37%, compared to the national average of 51.8%, and a sex ratio of 965 females per 1000 males. 69,033 (23.88%) lived in urban areas. Ethnic population was 8,174 (2.83%), of which Oraon were 1,493 and Barman 1,121.

As of the 1991 Bangladesh census, Joypurhat Sadar has a population of 225271. Males constitute 52.18% of the population, and females 47.82%. This Upazila's eighteen up population is 123804. Joypurhat Sadar has an average literacy rate of 33.1% (7+ years), and the national average of 32.4% literate.

== Points of interest ==
Joypurhat Sugar Mill's Limited is the largest autonomous sugar mill in the country. Pagla Dewan Boddhovumi is one of Bangladesh's most important monuments In the Belamla Village there are both the historical "Barashibalaya Temple" and "Akshibalaya Temple", famous historical places. Shahid doctor Abul Kasem Maidan is the main feature of this upazila. The central shahid minar of Joypurahat district is also situated here.

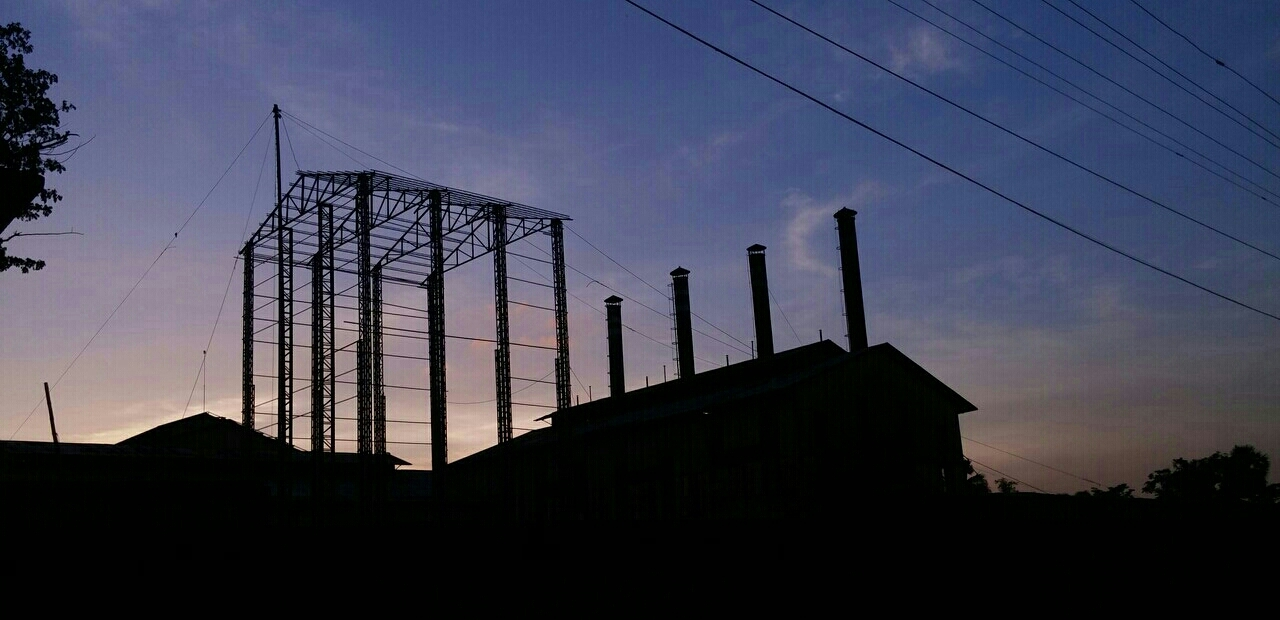
A silhouette of Joypurhat sugar mills factory at dusk.

== Administration ==
Joypurhat Thana was formed in 1918 and it was turned into an upazila in 1984.

Joypurhat Sadar Upazila is divided into Joypurhat Municipality and nine union parishads: Amdai, Bambu, Bhadsha, Chakborket, Dhalahar, Dogachi, Jamalpur, Mohammadabad, and Puranapail. The union parishads are subdivided into 184 mauzas and 192 villages.

Joypurhat Municipality is subdivided into 9 wards and 48 mahallas.

== Education ==
Joypurhat Girl's Cadet College is the second girl's cadet college of Bangladesh.

Joypurhat Government College is the highest educational institute in the district. The college is situated near the Joypurhat rail station which was established in 1963.

Joypurhat R.B. Govt. High School is the highest level school in the district. The high school was established in 1946 by Ramdeo Bajla. The school is located on the main road. The informal name of this school is "Bazla school" or 'zila school' . This school gained national recognition in 1977.

Joypurhat Govt. Girl's High School is one of the famous schools in the district. It was established in 1960 and nationalized in the year of 1977. The school boasts a 100% passing rate in both Junior and Secondary School Certificate examinations. Business Management Institute: It is first technology institution.

== Notable residents ==
- Montazur Rahman Akbar, film director, attended Akklepur F. U. Pilot High School.
- Fatema Tuz Zohra, Nazrul Geeti singer, grew up in Joypurhat and attended Joypurhat Government Girls High School.

== See also ==
- Upazilas of Bangladesh
- Districts of Bangladesh
- Divisions of Bangladesh
