= Kalai Moyen Uddin High School =

Kalai Moyen Uddin High School Bengali: কালাই ময়েন উদ্দীন মডেল সরকারি উচ্চ বিদ্যালয়

Information
- Established: 1913; 112 years ago
- Language: Bengali

Kalai Moyen Uddin Model Government High School or Kalai MU Model Government High School (Bengali: কালাই ময়েন উদ্দীন মডেল সরকারি উচ্চ বিদ্যালয়, romanized: Kālā'i maẏēna uddīna maḍēla sarakāri ucca bidyālaẏa) is a secondary school located in Kalai Upazila under Joypurhat District of Bangladesh. It is a Bangla medium government high school operating under the Secondary and Higher Secondary Education Board of Rajshahi. It was established in 1913. Its founder Moyen Uddin Talukder was a social leader and a landlord from the Talukder family of Kalai.

== Location ==
The school is near the Kalai Thana Health Complex, half a kilometer from the Joypurhat-Bogra road and Kalai Thana Headquarters. The bi-weekly Kalai haat (market) is nearby. The school is well connected by road, drawing its students from Kalai Upazila.

== History ==
During the British era, just after the cancellation of the partition of Bengal in 1911 (Banga Vanga), a number of educational institutions were established in the then East Bengal (now Bangladesh). The partition of Bengal (1905) would have been beneficial to the eastern part of Bengal (the present day Bangladesh) with Dhaka as its capital, and development works of this area would have been more focused. But in the wake of much political turmoil and debate it was cancelled in 1911. The British Government allowed the people of East Bengal more educational institutes, more budget allocation for development works, etc., mainly to appease the aggravated inhabitants. There was no seat of higher secondary education in the Khetlal Thana under the Joypurhat Mohokuma of Bogra District. As a result, some local people took the initiative to start a school.

Kalai was a village under the Khetlal Thana. Later Kalai became a separate thana. The school started with the name Kalai High English Institute in 1913 and was recognized by Calcutta (Kolkata) University in 1916. The school was first built on land donated by the local Talukder family. In 1933, a member of the Talukder family, Moyen Uddin, donated two large ponds to the school, and the school was named after him. The school has been donated 10-acre (40,000 m^{2}) land up until now.

== Staff and facilities ==
The school offers studies in science, humanities and commerce, and is equipped with a science laboratory, computers, library and physical fitness/gymnastics equipment. Kalai M. U. Model Govt. High School hosts cultural events and celebrates national days such as Independence Day, Victory Day, and International Mother Language Day.

=== Headmasters ===
The founding headmaster was Babu Gyanendra Kumar Bagchi. The current and 14th headmaster is Abdul Mannan Talukder.

- Babu Gyanendra Kumar Bagchi,
- Shri Gaddadhar Bhattacharya,
- Mohammad F. Hossain,
- Shri R.K. Mondol,
- Shri B. Banarjee,
- Shri Atul Chandra Chowdhury,
- Md. Abbas Ali,
- Babu Kali Mohon Sanyal,
- Babu Prafulla Chandra,
- Quazi Talebur Rahman, 1962 to 1973,
- Amzad Hossain,
- AKM Abul Hossain, Feb 1982 to Jan 2001,
- Md. Luthfor Rahman, Feb 2001 to July 2001,
- Md. Abdul Mannan Talukder, July 2001 to date.
