= Small Jamuna River =

Coordinates: 25.2384°N 89.0079°E

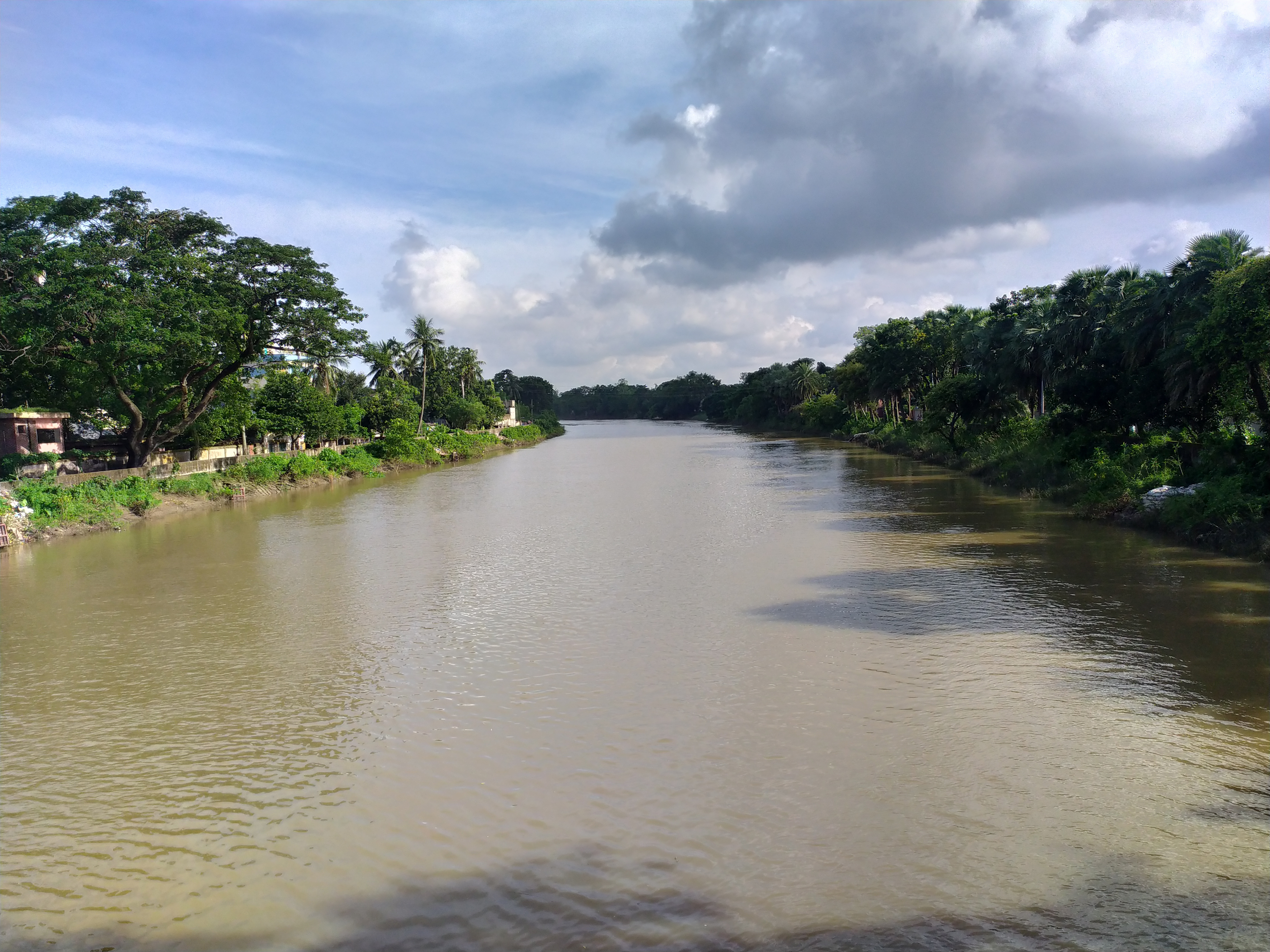
- Native name: ছোট যমুনা নদী (Bengali)

Location
- Country: Bangladesh
- Region: Rajshahi Division
- District: Joypurhat, Naogaon

Physical characteristics
- Discharge
  - location: Jamuna River

The Small Jamuna River (Bengali: ছোট যমুনা নদী) is a river in North Bengal, Bangladesh. In 2007, it was observed that the river might merge with the Jamuna River. It passes through Joypurhat and Naogaon
