= Hinda-Kosba Shahi Mosque =

Mosque in Khetlal Upazila, Joypurhat, Bangladesh

- হিন্দা-কসবা শাহী জামে মসজিদ
- Location of the mosque in Bangladesh

Religion
- Affiliation: Islam
- Ecclesiastical or organizational status: Mosque
- Status: Active

Location
- Location: Hinda, Borail Union, Khetlal Upazila, Joypurhat District, Rajshahi Division
- Country: Bangladesh
- Interactive map of Hinda-Kosba Shahi Mosque
- Coordinates: 24°59′50″N 89°08′08″E

Architecture
- Architect: Abdul Gofur Chishti
- Type: Mosque architecture
- Style: Islamic
- Founder: Abdul Khaliq Chishti
- Completed: 1958

Specifications
- Length: 15.1 m (49.5 ft)
- Width: 6.8 m (22.4 ft)
- Dome: Five
- Minaret: One
- Minaret height: 12 m (40 ft)

The Hinda-Kosba Shahi Mosque (Bengali: হিন্দা-কসবা শাহী মসজিদ) is a mosque located in the village of Hinda in Borail Union, Khetlal Upazila, Joypurhat District in Rajshahi Division of Bangladesh.

== Overview ==
Abdul Gofur Chishti designed the mosque. Under his instruction, Abdul Khaliq Chishti supervised the construction of the mosque in 1958.

The mosque is rectangular in plan and is 15.1 metres (49.5 ft) long and 6.8 metres (22.4 ft) wide. It has five domes, a large central one and four smaller ones surrounding it. Northeast of the structure is a detached 12-metre-tall (40 ft) minaret. There is also a small pond in the northwest quadrant of the compound.

== See also ==
- Islam in Bangladesh
- List of mosques in Bangladesh
