= Joypurhat District =

Joypurhat District জয়পুরহাট জেলা
- District of Bangladesh
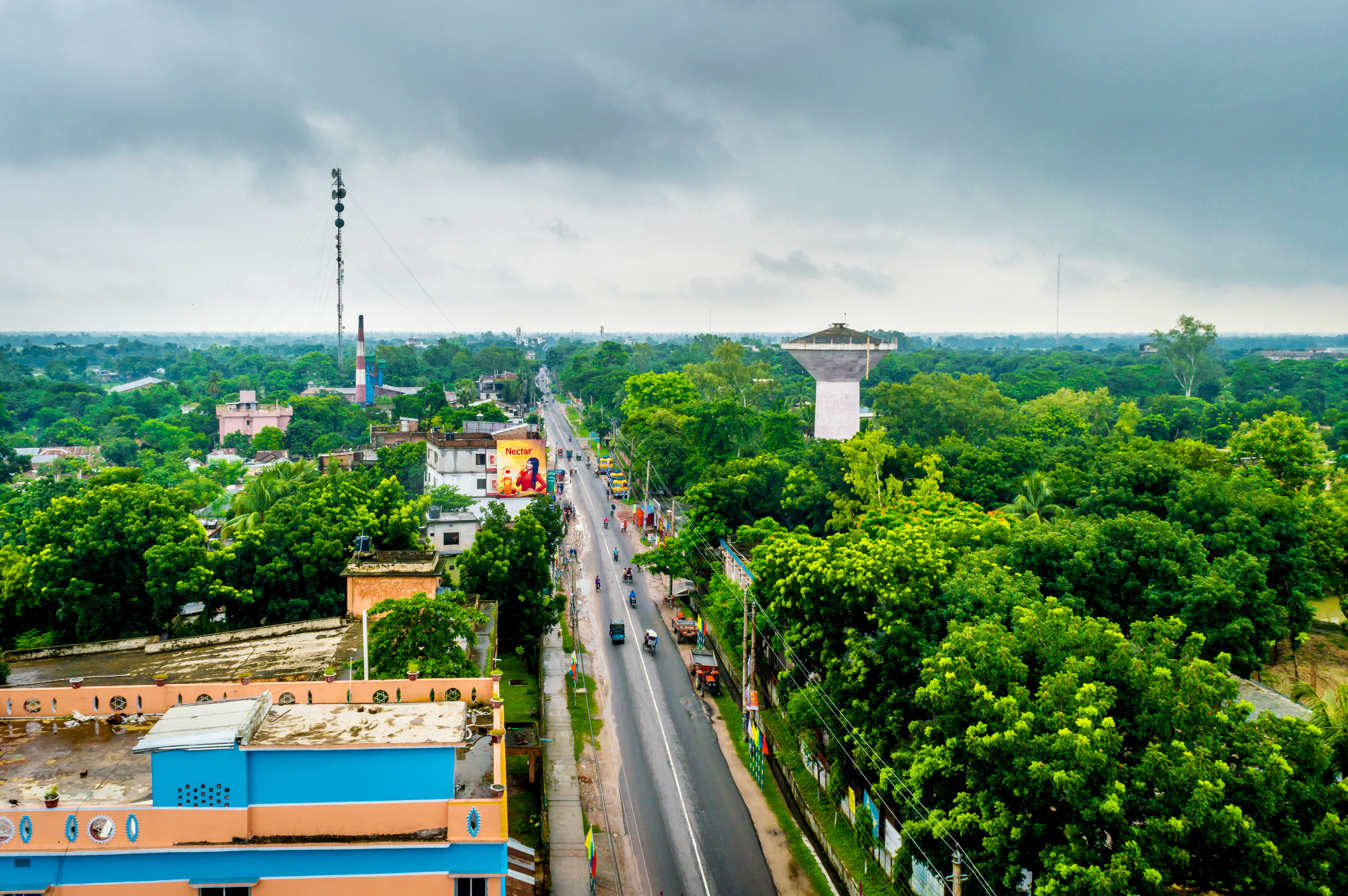
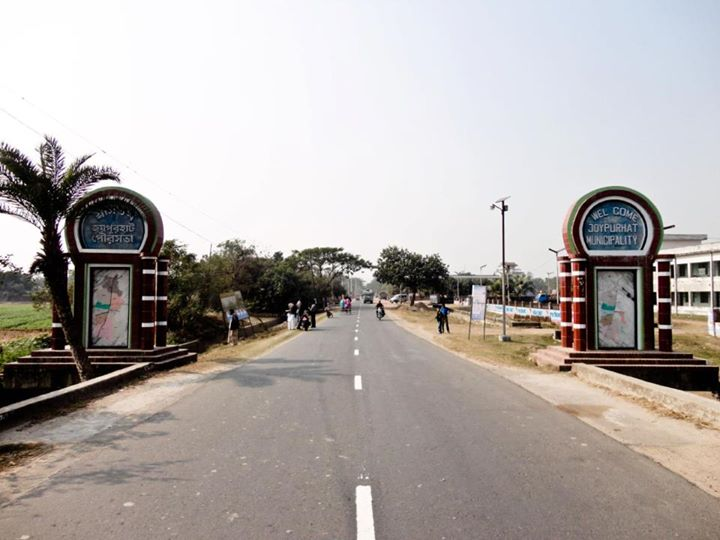
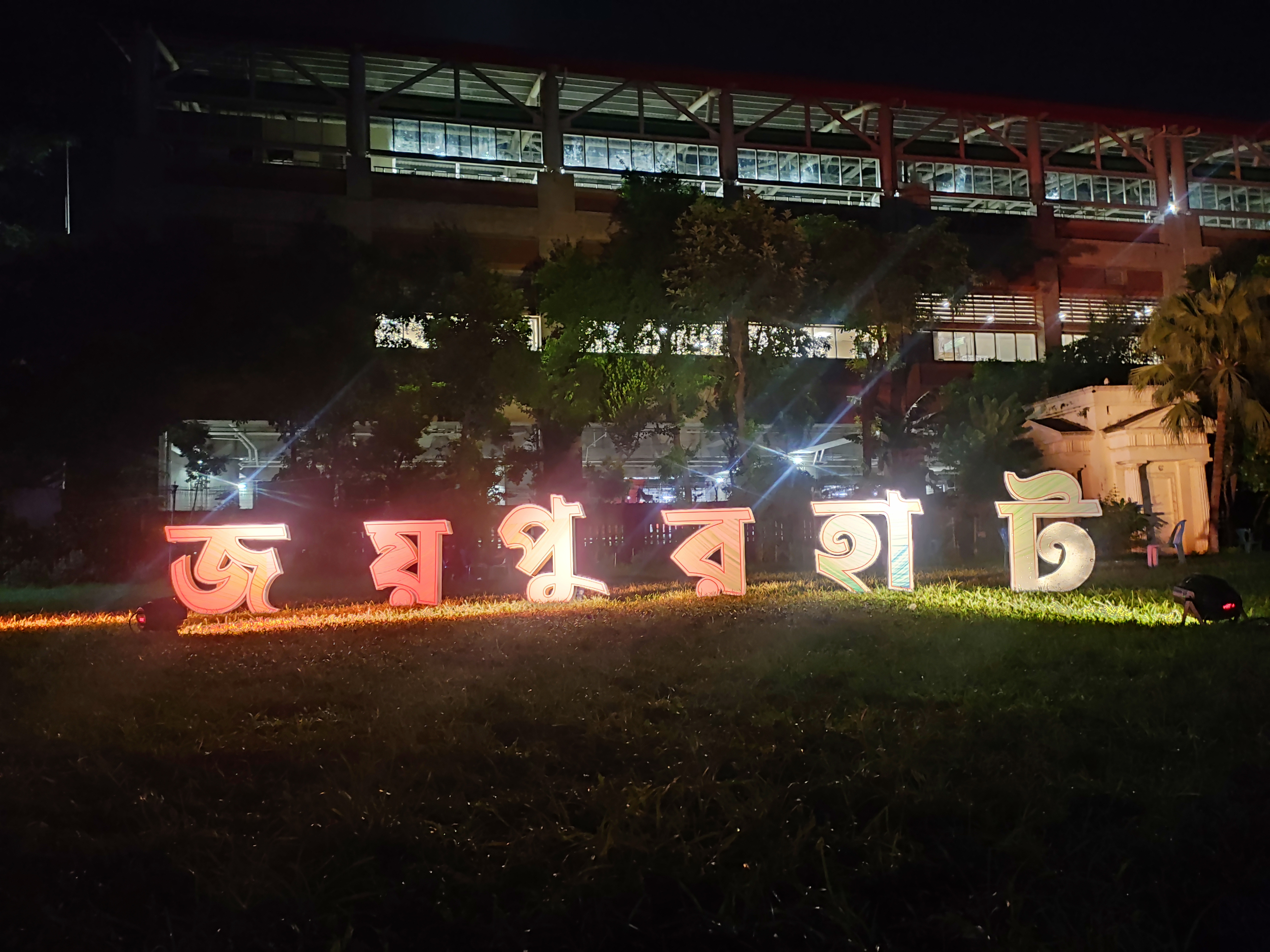
- Skyline of Joypurhat

- Location of Joypurhat in Bangladesh
- Interactive map of Joypurhat District
- Coordinates: 25.10°N 89.03°E
- Country: Bangladesh
- Division: Rajshahi Division
- Established: February 26, 1984 CE
- Headquarters: Joypurhat

Government
  - Deputy Commissioner: Md. Sharif

Area
  - Total: 965.44 km^{2} (372.76 sq mi)

Population (2022)
  - Total: 956,431
  - Density: 990.67/km^{2} (2,565.8/sq mi)
- Demonym(s): Joypurhati, Rajshahiyo
- Time zone: UTC+06:00 (BST)
- Postal code: 5900
- Area code: 0571
- ISO 3166 code: BD-24

Joypurhat District (Bengali: জয়পুরহাট জেলা) is a district in northern Bangladesh, and part of Rajshahi Division.

== Etymology ==
Prior to the coming of the Calcutta–Jalpaiguri railway line in 1884, the area was known as Jaipur. There was already a Jaipur railway station elsewhere in India, so when the local station was built it was named Jaipur Hat station (there was a hat, or market, nearby) to distinguish it from the other Jaipur. When the area was carved out of Bogra District in 1984, it took the name Joypurhat District.

== History ==
=== Ancient history ===
Joypurhat was an area under the Pala Empire and Sena dynasty for a long period of time. Till 16th and 17th centuries, there was no clear information about Joypurhat's history. Previously the local name for Joypurhat was Baghabarihat. Later it was called Gopendraganjahat in many archives.

Once Lalbazar Thana was established by containing the present Joypurhat Sadar Upazila and Panchbibi Upazila. The thana was located on the east side of Small Jamuna River named Puranapoil. Then Puranapoil Union was known as Karimnagar. A post office was established in Lalbazar Thana. The sub-registry office was established in Nawabganj. There were many Neelkuthi established in this area. At that era, Lalbazar Thana was a town. Back then it was the only work for the ordinary people of that area. From Lalbazar Thana, Small Jamuna River gorge, the whole travel, commerce, and trade were maintained. At that period Lalbazar Thana, Khetlal Upazila and Badalgachhi Upazila were under Dinajpur District. As Dinajpur District, Rangpur District and Rajshahi District were very large, in 1821, a new district was formed from the three districts and named Bogra District. At that time, Bogra District occupied by Adamdighi, Bogra Sadar, Sherpur from Rajshahi District; two upazila from Rangpur District and Khetlal Upazila, Badalgachhi Upazila, Lalbazar Thana from Dinajpur. Later, on December 16, 1868, Lalbazar Police Thana was moved to Khasbaguri. The local name of Khasbabri was Panchbibi.

== Geography ==
=== Rivers ===
Bangladesh is a country of many rivers. There are mainly five rivers in Joypurhat District. They are:

- Small Jamuna River passes through Joypurhat Sadar Upazila and Panchbibi Upazila.
- Tulshiganga River passes through Joypurhat Sadar Upazila, Khetlal Upazila and Akkelpur Upazila.
- Chiri River passes through sadar & Panchbibi Upazila.
- Haraboti River passes through Panchbibi khetlal Upazila & add with Tulshiganga River near Bottoli bazar khetlal.
- Sree River passes through Chakbarkat Joypurhat Sadar Upazila.

=== Climate ===
Joypurhat is a district of Tropical climate. In winter there is much more rainfall in Joypurhat than in summer. According to The Köppen climate classification, The average annual temperature in here is 25.4 °C and The average annual rainfall is 1738 mm. The driest month is December with 3 mm. Most precipitation falls in July, with an average of 364 mm. The warmest month of the year is August with an average temperature of 28.9 °C. In January, the average temperature is 18 °C. It is the lowest average temperature of the whole year.

Climate data for Joypurhat
Month	Jan	Feb	Mar	Apr	May	Jun	Jul	Aug	Sep	Oct	Nov	Dec	Year
Mean daily maximum °C (°F)	24.8 (76.6)	27.6 (81.7)	32.5 (90.5)	35 (95)	33.6 (92.5)	32.4 (90.3)	35.5 (95.9)	35.3 (95.5)	31.2 (88.2)	29.5 (85.1)	28.7 (83.7)	25.9 (78.6)	31.0 (87.8)
Daily mean °C (°F)	18 (64)	20.2 (68.4)	24.9 (76.8)	28.4 (83.1)	28.7 (83.7)	28.9 (84.0)	28.9 (84.0)	28.9 (84.0)	28.6 (83.5)	27 (81)	22.8 (73.0)	19.3 (66.7)	25.4 (77.7)
Mean daily minimum °C (°F)	11.2 (52.2)	12.9 (55.2)	17.3 (63.1)	21.9 (71.4)	23.8 (74.8)	25.4 (77.7)	26.1 (79.0)	26.2 (79.2)	25.6 (78.1)	22.9 (73.2)	17 (63)	12.6 (54.7)	20.2 (68.5)
Average precipitation mm (inches)	10 (0.4)	15 (0.6)	21 (0.8)	52 (2.0)	186 (7.3)	330 (13.0)	364 (14.3)	321 (12.6)	283 (11.1)	140 (5.5)	13 (0.5)	3 (0.1)	1,738 (68.2)
Source: National newspapers

The difference in precipitation between the driest month and the wettest month is 361 mm. The average temperatures vary during the year by 10.9 °C.

== Demographics ==
Historical population
Year	Pop.	±% p.a.
1974	507,741	—
1981	619,351	+2.88%
1991	765,011	+2.13%
2001	846,696	+1.02%
2011	913,768	+0.77%
2022	956,431	+0.42%

According to the 2022 Census of Bangladesh, Joypurhat District has 269,905 households and a population of 956,431 with an average 3.50 people per household. Among the population, 140,366 (14.68%) inhabitants are under 10 years of age. The population density is 945 people per km^{2}. Joypurhat District has a literacy rate (age 7 and over) of 73.73%, compared to the national average of 74.80%, and a sex ratio of 97.72 males per 100 females. Approximately, 23.44% (224,181) of the population live in urban areas. Ethnic population is 26,325 (2.75%) belonging to a variety of groups of which Oraon, Barman, Munda, Santal, Kudumi Mahato and Bedia have a population over 2,000.

=== Religion ===
The district of Joypurhat has 2573 mosques, 186 mosque-based library, 675 trained Imam, 2200 Imam, 424 temples, 21 churches and 18 Buddhist temples. Hinda - Kasba Shahi Mosque is one such mosque in Joypurhat.

Religions in Joypurhat District (2022)
Religion	Percent
Islam	89.91%
Hinduism	9.16%
Christianity	0.50%
Other or not stated	0.43%

Religion in present-day Joypurhat District
Religion	1941 (Note: Joypurhat, Khetlal and Panchbibi thanas of Bogra district)		1981		1991		2001		2011		2022	
Religion	Pop.	%	Pop.	%	Pop.	%	Pop.	%	Pop.	%	Pop.	%
Islam	165,275	73.46%	538,293	86.91%	674,584	88.18%	758,324	89.56%	819,235	89.66%	859,960	89.91%
Hinduism	47,664	21.18%	68,152	11.00%	73,193	9.57%	76,033	8.98%	80,696	8.83%	87,595	9.16%
Ethnic religion	11,929	5.30%	—N/a	—N/a	—N/a	—N/a	—N/a	—N/a	—N/a	—N/a	—N/a	—N/a
Christianity	130	0.06%	2,064	0.34%	3,331	0.44%	4,715	0.56%	4,822	0.53%	4,756	0.50%
Others (Note: Including Jainism, Buddhism, Zoroastrianism, Judaism, Ad-Dharmis, or not stated. After 1981 includes ethnic religions.)	2	0.00%	10,842	1.75%	13,903	1.81%	7,624	0.90%	9,015	0.98%	4,120	0.43%
Total Population	225,000	100%	619,351	100%	765,011	100%	846,696	100%	913,768	100%	956,431	100%

Muslims make up 89.91% of the population, while Hindus are 9.16% and Christians 0.50% of the population respectively. Other religions (mainly Sarna) are 0.43% of the population.

== Economy ==
Joypurhat's economy is mainly based on seasonal crops like rice, potato, wheat, onion, mango, jackfruit, and banana. It also produces sugarcane and it holds the country's largest sugar mill, Joypurhat Sugar Mill's Limited. There are rice mills, poultry farms, and other industries in this district. It exports many agricultural products. Hili land port is very close to Joypurhat district, so many people of this district do export-import business by this port and about all the vehicles of this port run over this district. Many businesses are conducted in Joypurhat.

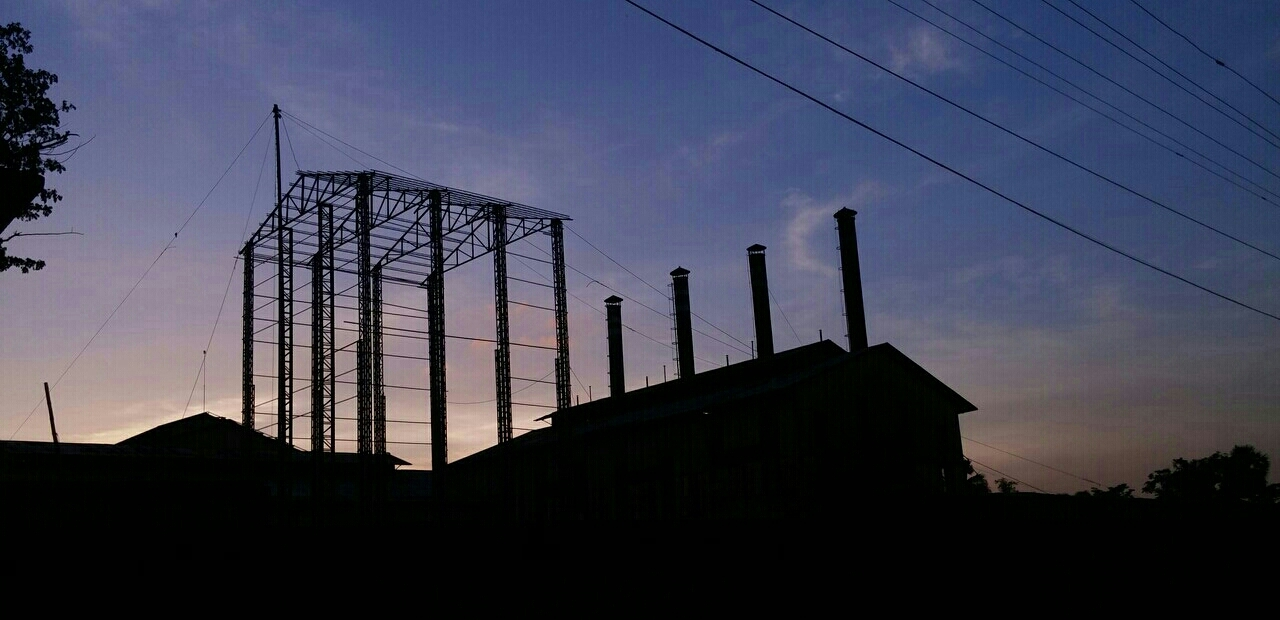
Joypurhat sugarmill at dusk

Chickens occupy a significant place in the economy of Joypurhat.

== Arts and culture ==
Joypurhat is a district of rural or rich folk culture. In British Raj period, many festivals such as keerton (কীর্তন), jaree (জারী), palagaan (পালাগান), kabigaan (কবিগান), baul (বাউল), murshidee (মুর্শিদী), lokgeeti (লোকগীতি), bhaoyaiya (ভাওয়াইয়া), and jattra (যাত্রা) were held on various occasions.

After 1971, many cultural organizations were established in this district level and upazila level.

=== Cultural groups ===
- Drama Circle

== Points of interest ==
Jamalganj is situated 10 km south west of Joypurhat. Pahar Pur (Buddhist Bihar), largely known as Somapura Mahavihara, is situated 6 km(approx)north-west of Jamalganj which is a symbol of past legacy of our knowledge on philosophy, architecture, arts and sculptures. It is UNESCO (United Nations Educational Scientific and Cultural Organization) certified world heritage site.

Jamalganj is known for its long traditional bazar (in English market) fore surrounded places. It is also known for its agricultural products like banana, paddy, rice, wheat, and potato. Also famous for its coal (bituminous) and cement. Joypurhat is famous for various sweets including inception of sweet named "Harivanga" which is now popular in the country

== Administration ==
Joypurhat District upazila geocode map

=== Sub-districts ===
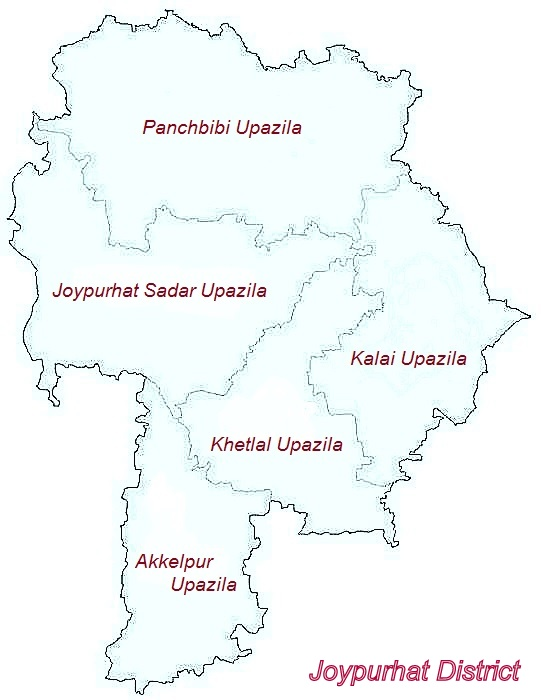
Map of Joypurhat District; Joypurhat Sadar Upazila, Panchbibi Upazila, Khetlal Upazila, Akkelpur Upazila, Kalai Upazila

Joypurhat has five subdistricts (upazilas):

Upazila	Official Website	Area (km^{2})	Population (2022)
Akkelpur	akkelpur.joypurhat.gov.bd	139.47	144,693
Joypurhat Sadar	joypurhatsadar.joypurhat.gov.bd	238.5	315,205
Kalai	kalai.joypurhat.gov.bd	166.30	146,055
Khetlal	khetlal.joypurhat.gov.bd	142.60	110,866
Panchbibi	panchbibi.joypurhat.gov.bd	278.53	239,612

=== Municipalities ===
There are five municipalities in Joypurhat District.

Deputy Commissioner (DC): Mohammad Yasin
Mayor: MD Mustafizur Rahaman Mostak

=== Parliamentary seats ===
Joypurhat has two parliament seats: Joypurhat-1 and Joypurhat-2.

Constituency NO.	Constituency Name	Extent	Present Jatiyo Sangshad MP	Political party	Legislature	Election occupied
34	Joypurhat-1 (details)	Joypurhat Sadar Upazila Panchbibi Upazila	Advocate Shamsul Alam	Bangladesh Awami League	11th Parliament	December 30, 2018
35	Joypurhat-2 (details)	Akkelpur Upazila Kalai Upazila Khetlal Upazila	Abu Sayeed Al Mahmud Swapan	Bangladesh Awami League	11th Parliament	December 30, 2018

== Transport ==
=== Roads ===
Joypurhat is a small district in Rajshahi Division. It has 342.59 km cobbled road, 61.59 km semi-cobbled road and 1569 km raw road.

=== Railway stations ===
Joypurhat contains eight railway stations. The total railways of Joypurhat are 38.86 km.

- Joypurhat railway station, Joypurhat Sadar Upazila
- Panchbibi railway station, Panchbibi Upazila
- Jamalganj railway station, Akkelpur Upazila
- Akkelpur railway station, Akkelpur Upazila
- Jafarpur railway station, Akkelpur Upazila
- Tilakpur railway station, Akkelpur Upazila
- Bagjana railway station, Panchbibi Upazila

Joypurhat Railway Station was established in 1884 during the British Raj period. It is a very important railway station in northern Bangladesh.

== Education ==
There are 27 colleges in the district. They include Joypurhat Government College, Akkelpur Mujibar Rahman College, Amdai United Degree College, founded 1946, Joypurhat Government Women's College (1972), Joypurhat Women's Degree College, Kalai Degree College, Khetlal Syeed Altafunnesa College, and Mohipur Haji Mohsin Government College (1969).

Joypurhat Girls' Cadet College, founded in 2006, is a military high school and college for girls.

According to Banglapedia, R.B. Govt. High School (1946), Komorgram High School, founded in 1968, Joypurhat Government Girls' High School (1977), Kalai Moyen Uddin High School (1913), Khanjanpur High School (1901), Khanjanpur Mission Girl's High School (1919), Sonamukhi High School (1916), Teghar High School (1940), and Uchai Jerka S.C. High School (1925) are notable secondary schools.

Notable Alia Madrasas:

Baniapara Kamil Madrasa (1779) (Sadar)

Hanail Nomania Kamil Madrasa (Sadar)

Karai Nurul Huda Kamil Madrasa (Sadar)

Jaipurhat Siddiqia Kamil Model Madrasa (Sadar)

Ali Mamud Purna Gopinathpur Alim Madrasa

== See also ==
- Districts of Bangladesh
- Rajshahi Division
- Divisions of Bangladesh
- Upazila
- Administrative geography of Bangladesh
