= North Bengal State Library =

- উত্তরবঙ্গ রাজ্য গ্রন্থাগার
- 26.3198°N 89.4419°E
- Location: Sagardighi, Cooch Behar, West Bengal, India
- Type: Public Library
- Established: 1870

Collection
- Items collected: books, journals, newspapers, magazines, and manuscripts
- Size: ~ 97,184 books/manuscripts ~ 60 journals and periodicals

Access and use
- Access requirements: Open

Other information
- Website: coochbehar.gov.in/n-b-state-library/

North Bengal State Library is the largest library in the North Bengal region of India, situated in the city of Cooch Behar.

== History ==
During the reign of Maharaja Nripendra Narayan, Colonel John Colpoys Haughton was the acting Commissioner of Cooch Behar (1864–73). Haughton established the State Library of Cooch Behar in 1870 using a collection of rare books obtained from the auction sale of M/S Rozario & Co. of London. It was opened to the public in 1882. At first, the library was housed in a "Nilkuthi" (A specifically European house or bus.) In 1895, it was handed over to the Maharaja Sir Nripendra Narayan who moved the library to Lansdown Hall, now the District Magistrate's Office.

In 1949, on the eve of merger of the Cooch Behr State with the Indian Union, the library was run by five employees, including one librarian, and was under the direct control of the State Council Minister. After the merge, the library went under the control of the Education Department and thus the District Magistrate. Its staff was reduced to one librarian and one other worker.

In 1968, the State Library was merged with the Cooch Behar district library, and renamed as North Bengal State Library.
