= Joypurhat Government College =

Public college in Joypurhat, Bangladesh

Joypurhat Govt. College
- জয়পুরহাট সরকারি কলেজ
- Motto: জ্ঞানই শক্তি
- Motto in English: Knowledge is power
- Type: Government College
- Established: November 17, 1963
- Academic affiliations: Bangladesh National University; Rajshahi Education Board
- Chancellor: President Mirza Fakhrul Islam Alamgir
- Principal: Professor A. K. M Saiful Islam
- Academic staff: 55
- Students: 13,779
- Undergraduates: 8,004
- Postgraduates: 1,075
- Other students: 2,400 (HSC)
- Location: Shanti Nagor, Joypurhat, Bangladesh; 25.0972°N 89.0236°E
- Campus: 8.7 acres (3.5 ha); urban
- Language: Bengali

Joypurhat Govt. College is a government higher education institution in the Joypurhat district, Bangladesh. It is located near Joypurhat Railway Station and was established in 1963. As of November 2025, the Ministry of Education classifies it as an "A" category college. As of 2026, the college has 13,779 students.

== History ==
On November 17, 1963, Joypurhat Government College was initially established in an old jute warehouse near the Hanuman Room in Bajla, adjacent to the northern region's railway station platform. The college began offering education at the higher secondary and bachelor's (pass) levels.

In 1966, the college was relocated to a newly constructed building on the western side of the railway station. The institution was nationalized in 1980. Subsequently, bachelor's (honours) courses were introduced in 1997, followed by master's courses in 2006.

As of 2026, the college has a total of 13,779 students.

== Campus ==
The college spans an area of 8.7 acres. It is located in a purpose-built building in Shanti Nago, Joypurhat, Bangladesh, near the Joypurhat Railway Station.

== Academics ==
Currently, the college offers education at the higher secondary level in science, humanities, and commerce streams. The college offers bachelor's (honours) courses and master's courses. Saiful Islam is the college's principal. As of November 2025, the Ministry of Education classifies it as an "A" category college.

== See also ==
- Board of Intermediate and Secondary Education, Rajshahi
