= Khetlal Upazila =

Khetlal Upazila ক্ষেতলাল উপজেলা
- Upazila of Bangladesh
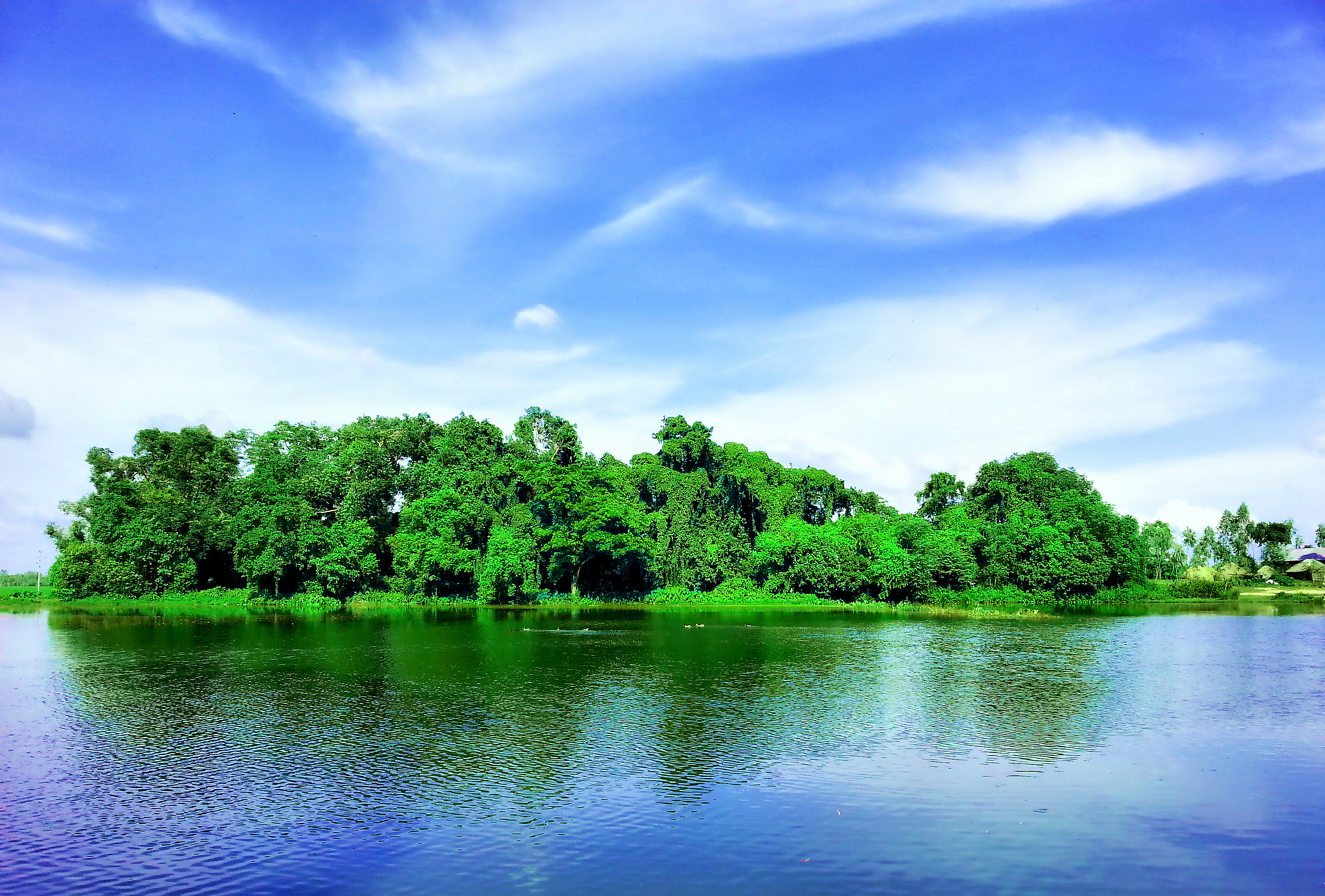
- Lake in Khetlal Upazila

- Coordinates: 25°1.5′N 89°8′E
- Country: Bangladesh
- Division: Rajshahi
- District: Joypurhat

Area
  - Total: 142.61 km^{2} (55.06 sq mi)

Population (2022)
  - Total: 110,866
  - Density: 777.41/km^{2} (2,013.5/sq mi)
- Time zone: UTC+6 (BST)
- Postal code: 5920
- Website: Official Map of Khetlal

Khetlal Upazila mauza geocode map

Khetlal Upazila (Bengali: ক্ষেতলাল উপজেলা) is an upazila of Joypurhat District in the division of Rajshahi, Bangladesh. Khetlal Thana was formed in 1847 and it was turned into an upazila on 3 July 1983. Khetlal Municipality was declared on 9 December 2010.

== Geography ==
Khetlal Upazila, having an area of 142.61 km^{2}, is located in between 24°56' and 25°08' north latitudes and in between 89°02' and 89°12' east longitudes. The upazila is bounded by Joypurhat Sadar Upazila on the north, Akkelpur and Dhupchanchia upazilas on the south, Kalai and Shibganj (Bogura) upazilas on the east, Joypurhat Sadar and Akkelpur upazilas on the west.

Main rivers: Tulsiganga, Harabati.

== History ==
Khetlāl was listed in the Ain-i-Akbari (as "Khetnāl") as a mahal in sarkar Ghoraghat. It was listed with an assessed revenue of 40,367 dams (this translation spells the name "Kaṇhṭál").

== Archaeology ==
Swadhin Sen identified 8 early medieval (6th/7th century or later) archaeological sites in Khetlal upazila: one at Khetlal itself, and the others at Rasulpur, Krisnanagar, Khetlal Baira, Kasba, Dasara, Ati, and Banaich. The sites of Khetlal and Khetlal Baira are located on the left (east) bank of the Asranga beel, which represents part of a former course of the Itakhola river, while the sites of Dasara and Ati are located on the right (west) bank. The sites of Kasba and Banaich are relatively far from the present course of the Itakhola. The site at Rasulpur is located on the left bank of the Tulsiganga river, while the site at Krisnanagar is located on the left bank of the Katahari river. All eight sites are located on fluvial terrace as opposed to floodplain.

== Demographics ==
Religions in Khetlal Upazila (2022)
Religion	Percent
Islam	91.16%
Hinduism	8.60%
Other or not stated	0.24%

According to the 2022 Bangladeshi census, Khetlal Upazila had 32,858 households and a population of 110,866. 7.35% of the population were under 5 years of age. Khetlal had a literacy rate (age 7 and over) of 70.00%: 73.51% for males and 66.67% for females, and a sex ratio of 95.99 males for every 100 females. 21,945 (19.79%) lived in urban areas. Ethnic population is 1443 (1.30%), of which Barman are 1099.

Population of upazila by ethnicity (2022)
1. Bengali (98.7%)
2. Barman (0.99%)
3. Others (0.31%)

According to the 2011 Census of Bangladesh, Khetlal Upazila had 29,805 households and a population of 108,326. 19,441 (17.95%) were under 10 years of age. Khetlal had a literacy rate (age 7 and over) of 53.47%, compared to the national average of 51.8%, and a sex ratio of 998 females per 1000 males. 11,711 (10.81%) lived in urban areas.

Par the 2001 Bangladesh census, the upazila had a population of 115918 constituting 59274 males, 56644 females, 105728 Muslims, 9981 Hindus, 65 Buddhists, 18 Christians and 126 from other religions. Indigenous communities such as santal and oraon also belong to this upazila.

== Administration ==
Khetlal Upazila is divided into Khetlal Municipality and five union parishads:Alampur, Barail, Baratara, Khetlal, and Mamudpur. The union parishads are subdivided into 88 mauzas and 155 villages.

Khetlal Municipality is subdivided into 9 wards and 9 mahallas.

== See also ==
- Upazilas of Bangladesh
- Districts of Bangladesh
- Divisions of Bangladesh
