= R.B. Govt. High School =

Joypurhat R.B. Govt. High School
- জয়পুরহাট রামদেও বাজলা সরকারি উচ্চ বিদ্যালয়

Location
- Sadar Road, Joypurhat; 5900; Bangladesh; 25.1004°N 89.0319°E

Information
- Established: 2 February 1946
- Founder: Ramdeo Bazla
- School board: Rajshahi Education Board
- School district: Joypurhat
- Headmaster: Fazlul Haque
- Staff: 30
- Faculty: 32
- Grades: 6-10
- Age range: 11-18
- Enrollment: 1,025
- Language: Bengali
- Classrooms: 13
- Campus size: 3.89 acres (1.57 ha)
- Campus type: Urban
- Color
- Sports: Football, cricket, basketball, volleyball, badminton
- Website: www.rbgovthighschool.edu.bd

Joypurhat R.B. Govt. High School (Bengali: জয়পুরহাট রামদেও বাজলা সরকারি উচ্চ বিদ্যালয়, also known as Zila School or Bazla School) is a government high school in Joypurhat, Bangladesh. It was established in 1946.

== History ==
The school is named after the land donor of the school campus, Ramdeo Bazla, a prominent merchant of Joypurhat. It was nationalized on 1 June 1977.

== Facilities ==
Classes are held in two shifts: Morning & Day.

The school hostel has a residential capacity of 60 residents.

== Extracurricular activities ==
- Computer club
- Scouting
- Games and sports (mostly athletics, cricket, badminton and football)
- Debating
- Math and language competitions
- Picnic
- Social development

== See also ==
- Education in Bangladesh
- List of schools in Bangladesh
