= Joypurhat Sugar Mill =

Sugar plant in Bangladesh

Coordinates: 25.111°N 89.024°E

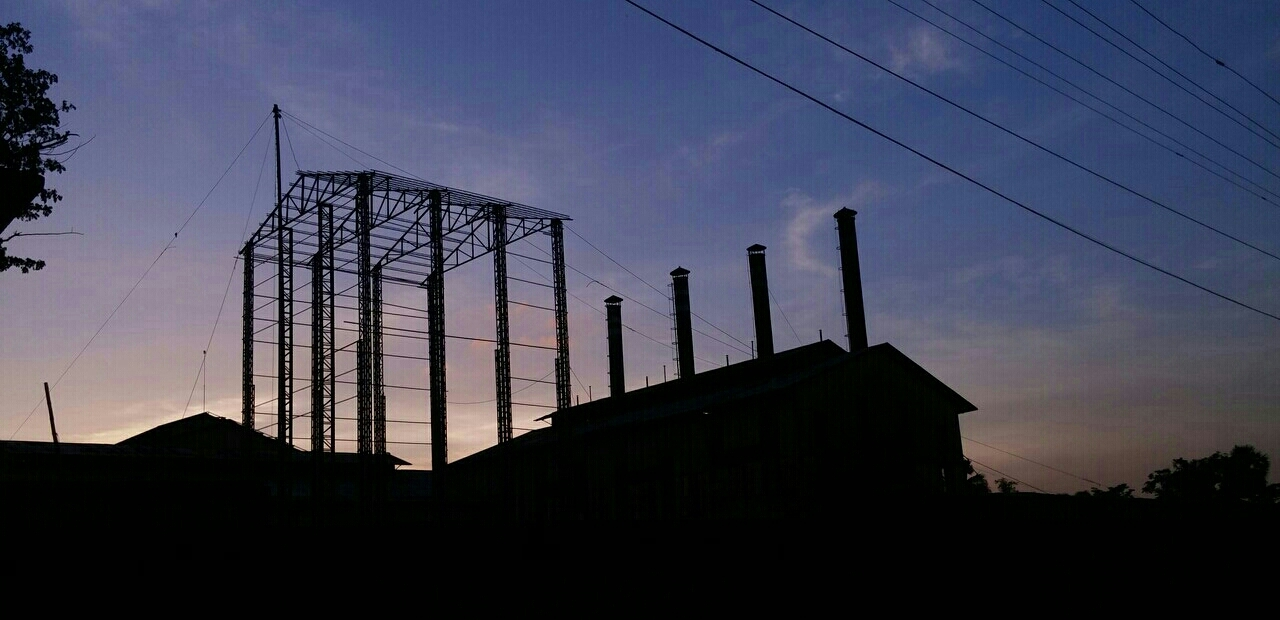
- Formation: 1963
- Headquarters: Joypurhat, Bangladesh
- Region served: Bangladesh
- Official language: Bengali

Joypurhat Sugar Mill is the largest government-owned sugar mill factory in Bangladesh. It is located in the north-western Joypurhat district in Rajshahi division. It has the capability of crushing 14,000 metric tons of sugarcane daily.

== History ==
Joypurhat Sugar Mill was established in 1963 on 100 acres in Joypurhat town. During the Bangladesh Liberation war, the mill was used by Pakistan army as a base. The military set up a court and tried prisoners held there. The prisoners were sentenced to death and executed in the mill. The factory is the largest government-owned sugar mill in Bangladesh. Since 1990 the mill has been experiencing losses. The workers in the mill are represented by Joypurhat Sugar Mill Workers Union. In March 2015 sugar farmers and suppliers protested the non-payment of dues by the mill. The mill blamed it on poor sales and overstocking of sugar.

=== Pollution ===
In March 2015, environmentalists accused the factory of polluting the Chhoto Jamuna River and killing thousands of fish in the river. Thousands of people near the plant have fallen sick from water that was contaminated by factory waste. The factory does not have a treatment plant for effluents.
