= Panchbibi Upazila =

Panchbibi Upazila পাঁচবিবি উপজেলা
- Upazila of Bangladesh
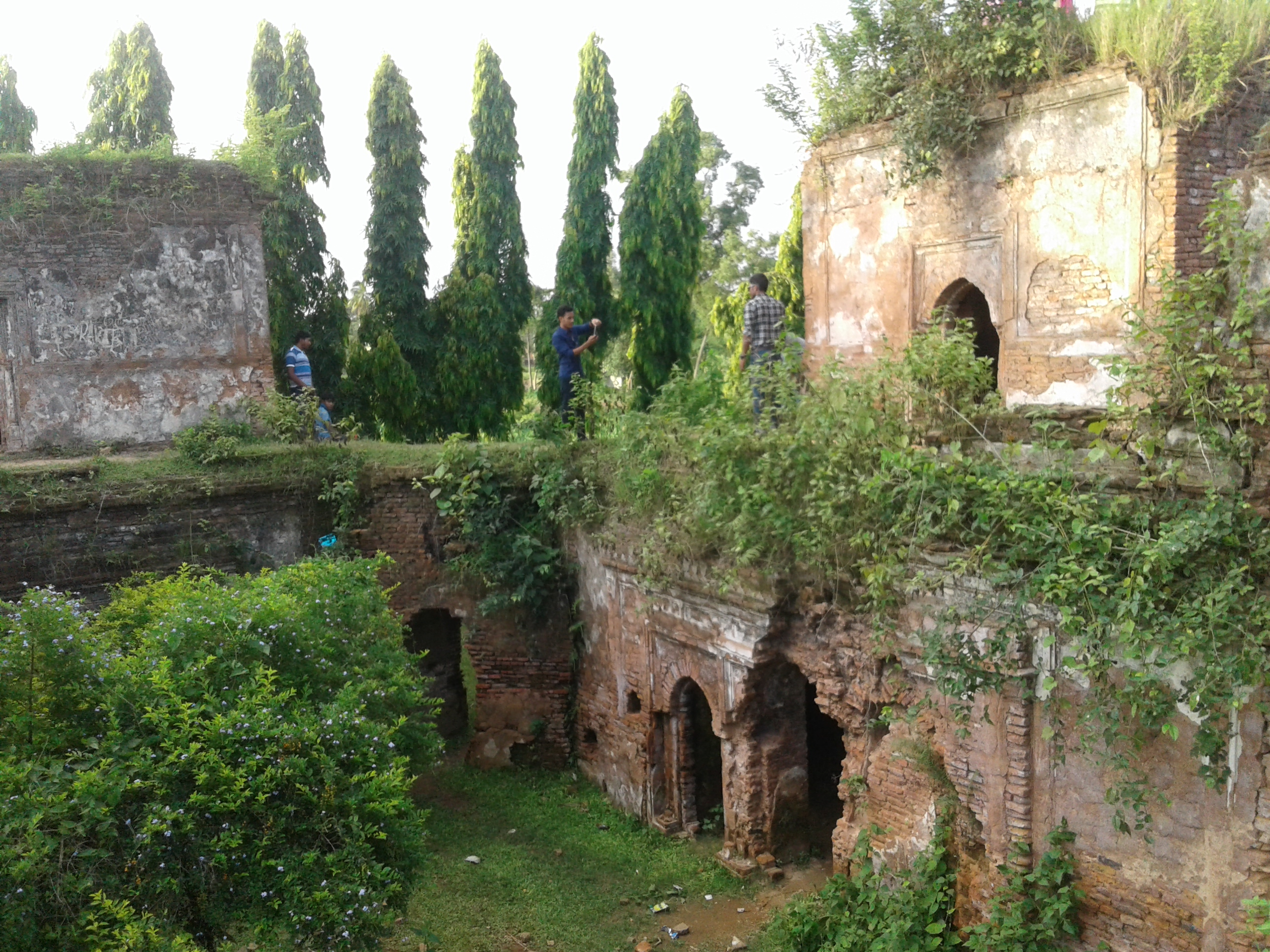
- Lokma Palace

- Coordinates: 25°11.7′N 89°1.2′E
- Country: Bangladesh
- Division: Rajshahi
- District: Joypurhat

Area
  - Total: 311.77 km^{2} (120.38 sq mi)

Population (2022)
  - Total: 239,612
  - Density: 768.55/km^{2} (1,990.5/sq mi)
- Time zone: UTC+6 (BST)
- Postal code: 5910
- Area code: 0571
- Website: Official Map of Panchbibi

Panchbibi Upazila mauza geocode map

Panchbibi Upazila (Bengali: পাঁচবিবি উপজেলা) is an upazila of Joypurhat District in the division of Rajshahi, Bangladesh.

== Geography ==
Panchbibi is located at 25.1958°N 89.0208°E. It has a total area of 311.77 km^{2}.

Panchbibi Upazila is bounded by Hakimpur and Ghoraghat Upazilas in Dinajpur district, and Hili CD Block in Dakshin Dinajpur district, West Bengal, India, on the north, Gobindaganj Upazila in Gaibandha District and Kalai Upazila in Joypurhat District on the east, Joypurhat Sadar Upazila on the south and Joypurhat Sadar Upazila and Balurghat CD Block in Dakshin Dinajpur district, West Bengal, India, on the west.

== Demographics ==
Religions in Panchbibi Upazila (2022)
Religion	Percent
Islam	85.54%
Hinduism	12.18%
Christianity	1.43%
Other or not stated	0.85%

According to the 2022 Bangladeshi census, Panchbibi Upazila had 66,628 households and a population of 239,612. 7.67% of the population were under 5 years of age. Panchbibi had a literacy rate (age 7 and over) of 73.27%: 76.23% for males and 70.39% for females, and a sex ratio of 98.15 males for every 100 females. 31,817 (13.28%) lived in urban areas. Ethnic population is 14,346 (5.99%), of which Oraon are 3452 and Santal are 2172.

Population of upazila by ethnicity (2022)
1. Bengali (94.0%)
2. Oraon (1.44%)
3. Santal (0.91%)
4. Others (3.64%)

According to the 2011 Census of Bangladesh, Panchbibi Upazila had 60,983 households and a population of 235,568. 46,234 (19.63%) were under 10 years of age. Panchbibi had a literacy rate (age 7 and over) of 54.57%, compared to the national average of 51.8%, and a sex ratio of 983 females per 1000 males. 22,475 (9.54%) lived in urban areas. Ethnic population was 13,411 (5.69%), of which Oraon were 3,474, Barman 2,763 and Santal 2,186.

According to the 2001 Bangladesh census, Population of the upazila was: Total 215,806; male 110,588, female 105,218; Muslim 183,355, Hindu 23,925, Buddhist 3,451, Christian 81 and others 4,994. Indigenous communities such as santal, munda and oraon belong to this upazila.

As of the 1991 Bangladesh census, Panchbibi has a population of 193,365. Males constitute 51.06% of the population, and females 48.94%. This Upazila's population of people aged eighteen and higher is 99,108. Panchbibi has an average literacy rate of 30.6% (7+ years), against the national average of 32.4% literate.

== Administration ==
Panchbibi Thana, now an upazila, was formed in 1868.

Panchbibi Upazila is divided into Panchbibi Municipality and eight union parishads: Aolai, Atapur, Aymarasulpur, Bagjana, Balighata, Dharanji, Kusumba, and Mohammadpur. The union parishads are subdivided into 222 mauzas and 247 villages.

Panchbibi Municipality is subdivided into 9 wards and 14 mahallas.

== See also ==
- Upazilas of Bangladesh
- Districts of Bangladesh
- Divisions of Bangladesh
