= Santahar Junction railway station =

Railway station in Adamdighi Upazila, Bangladesh

Santahar Junction সান্তাহার জংশন
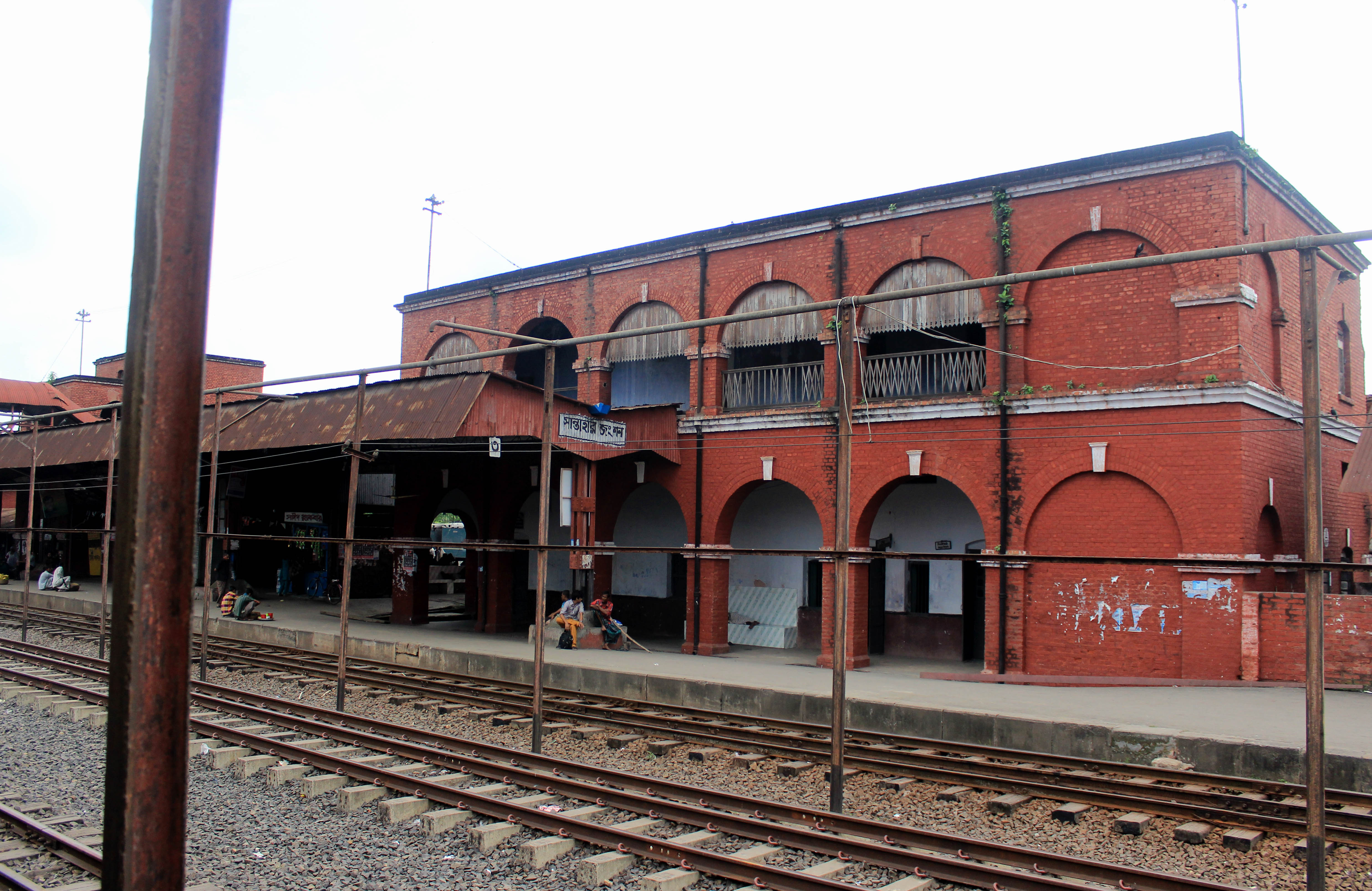

General information
- Location: Santahar, Bogra District; Bangladesh
- Coordinates: 24°48′26″N 88°59′10″E
- System: Bangladesh Railway junction station
- Owner: Bangladesh Railway
- Lines: Chilahati-Parbatipur-Santahar-Darshana Line; Santahar-Kaunia Line

History
- Opened: 1878

Services
Preceding station	Bangladesh Railway	Following station
Chatiyangram	Line; Chilahati–Parbatipur–Santahar–Darshana	Raninagar
Terminus	Line; Santahar-Kaunia	Alamdighi
Location
- Location within Bangladesh

Santahar Junction railway station (Bengali: সান্তাহার জংশন রেলওয়ে স্টেশন) is a railway junction in Adamdighi Upazila in Bogra District of Rajshahi Division in Bangladesh.

== History ==
From 1878, the railway route from Kolkata, then called Calcutta, to Siliguri was in two laps. The first lap was a 185 km journey along the Eastern Bengal State Railway from Calcutta Station (later renamed Sealdah) to Damookdeah Ghat on the southern bank of the Padma River, then across the river in a ferry and the second lap of the journey. A 336 km (209 mi) metre gauge line of the North Bengal Railway linked Saraghat on the northern bank of the Padma to Siliguri. It was during this period that Santahar came up as a railway station.

In 1899-1900 a metre gauge railway line was constructed between Santahar and Fulchhari, on the western bank of the Jamuna by Brahmaputra-Sultanpur Railway Company.

The Kolkata-Siliguri main line was converted to broad gauge in stages. The Shakole-Santahar section was converted in 1910–1914, when Hardinge Bridge was under construction. The Hardinge Bridge was opened in 1915 and the Santahar-Parbatipur section was converted in 1924.

In 1971, during the Bangladesh Liberation War, 15000 Biharis in the adjoining town of Santahar were massacred by members of the Mukti Bahini.

== See also ==
- Ahsanganj railway station
- Santahar
