= Tulshiganga River =

River in Bangladesh

Coordinates: 25.0447°N 89.0745°E

Tulshiganga River (Bengali: তুলসিগঙ্গ নদী, romanized: Tulasigaṅga Nadīpolluting the river.

== Early history ==
Tulshiganga is an important river of the district. It enters the district near the village of Mukindapur, in Panchbibi thana from the Dinajpur district. Entering this district it runs south-west in a meandering course till it falls in the Jamuna, near Akkelpur. The river beyond this point is known as the Jamuna and flowing past Naogaon District falls into the Atrai. The principal places on its banks are pathuriaghatA where there are some old relics. It runs a course of about forty miles in this district.

Another river, the Chhiri nadi also enters this district from Dinajpur near village Salna in the Panchbibi thana. It flows in the district for about thirty miles and then falls in the Jamuna near Khanjanpur.

From near Khanjanpur a small stream takes off. from Tulshjganga. Flowing for a course of about fifteen miles, it falls again in the Tulshjganga. There is a narrow canal, which is dry in several places during the greater part of the year. It is an artificial branch of the Jamuna and is said to have been excavated about 200 years ago by one Rajib Lochan Mondol, a rich merchant Zamindar of Belamla. It was dug for the purpose of connecting Jamuna with Tulshiganga. This canal, Kata Ja.munD, as it is known, starts from Sikola, near Khanjanpur and proceeding almost directly south for about eighteen miles, joins the Tul- shiganga a little above Akkelpur. Ja malganj, a rising centre of trade and a railway station, is situated on its bank.
