= Akkelpur Upazila =

Akkelpur Upazila আক্কেলপুর উপজেলা
- Upazila
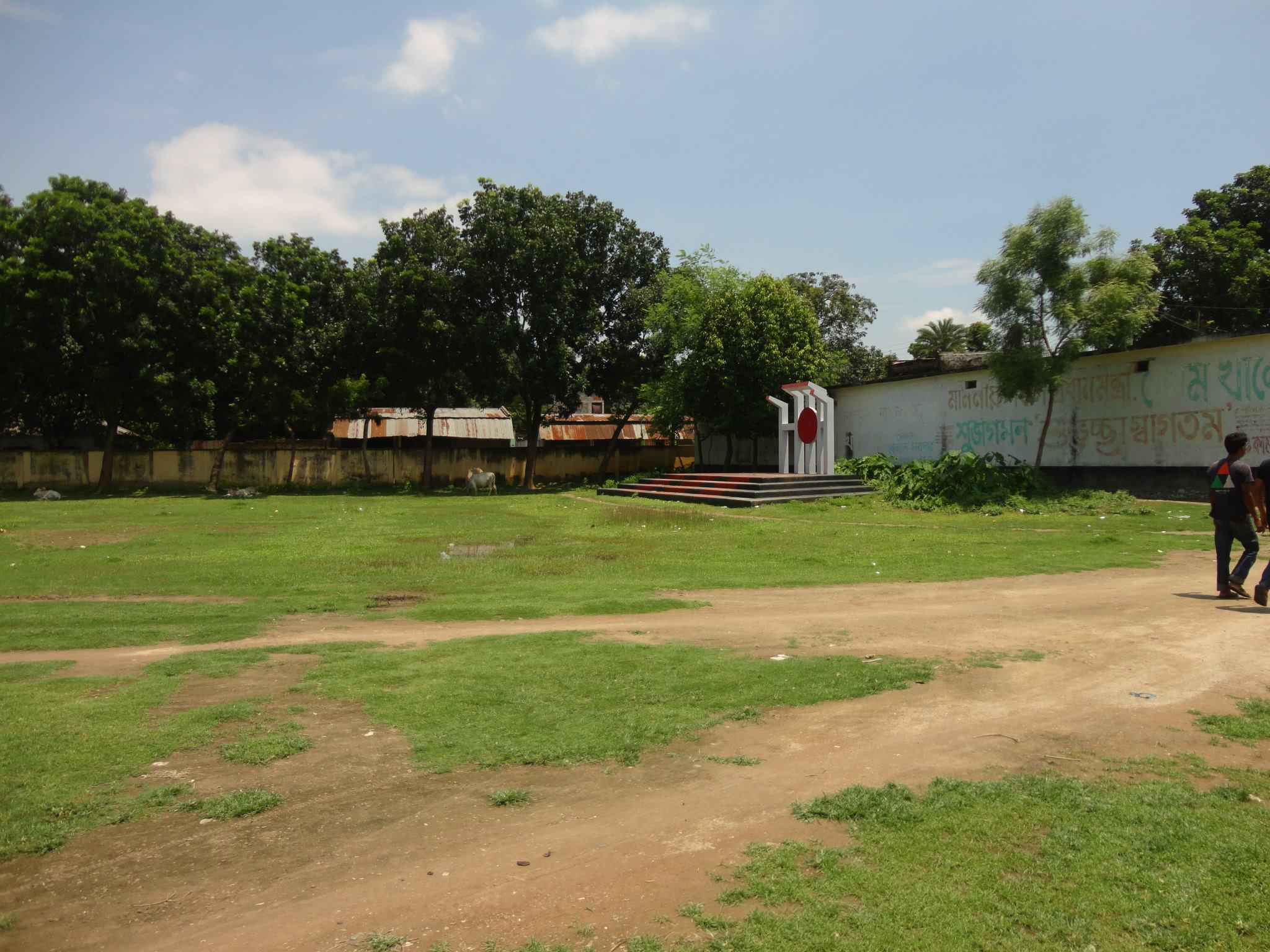
- Shaheed Minar in Akkelpur

- Coordinates: 24°58.5′N 89°1.2′E
- Country: Bangladesh
- Division: Rajshahi
- District: Joypurhat

Area
  - Total: 154.94 km^{2} (59.82 sq mi)
- Elevation: 44 m (144 ft)

Population (2022)
  - Total: 144,693
  - Density: 933.86/km^{2} (2,418.7/sq mi)
- Time zone: UTC+6 (BST)
- Postal code: 5940
- Website: Official Map of Akkelpur

Akkelpur Upazila mauza geocode map

Akkelpur Upazila (Bengali: আক্কেলপুর উপজেলা) is an upazila of Joypurhat District in the division of Rajshahi, Bangladesh.

== Geography ==
Akkelpur is located at 24.9750°N 89.0208°E, with a total area of 154.94 km^{2}. It is the smallest upazila in Joypurhat Zila. It is bounded by Joypurhat Sadar and Khetlal upazilas to the north, Dhupchanchia upazila of Bogra district to the east, Adamdighi upazila of Bogra district to the south, and Naogaon Sadar and Badalgachhi upazilas to the west.

== Demographics ==
Religions in Akkelpur Upazila (2022)
Religion	Percent
Islam	93.41%
Hinduism	6.38%
Other or not stated	0.21%

According to the 2022 Bangladeshi census, Akkelpur Upazila had 41,188 households and a population of 144,693. 7.58% of the population were under 5 years of age. Akkelpur had a literacy rate (age 7 and over) of 74.62%: 77.49% for males and 71.97% for females, and a sex ratio of 93.64 males for every 100 females. 37,216 (25.72%) lived in urban areas. Ethnic population is 998 (0.69%).

According to the 2011 Census of Bangladesh, Akkelpur Upazila had 36,638 households and a population of 137,619. 26,202 (19.04%) were under 10 years of age. Akkelpur had a literacy rate (age 7 and over) of 56.95%, compared to the national average of 51.8%, and a sex ratio of 1014 females per 1000 males. 24,227 (17.60%) lived in urban areas. Ethnic population was 897 (0.65%).

According to the 2001 Bangladesh census, Akkelpur had a population of 128,952; male 65,269, female 63,683; Muslim 120,129, Hindu 7,658, Buddhist 24 and others 1,141. Indigenous communities such as santal and munda belong to this upazila.

At the 1991 Bangladesh census, Akkelpur had a population of 126,046, in 24,475 households. Males constituted 52.9% of the population, and females 47.1%. The population aged 18 or older was 68,033. Akkelpur had an average literacy rate of 34% (7+ years), against the national average of 32.4%.

== Administration ==
Akkelpur, formed as a Thana in 1972, was turned into an upazila on 15 February 1983.

Akkelpur Upazila is divided into Akkelpur Municipality and five union parishads: Gopinathpur, Raikali, Rukindipur, Sonamukhi, and Tilakpur. The union parishads are subdivided into 116 mauzas and 145 villages.

Akkelpur Municipality is subdivided into 9 wards and 15 mahallas.

== See also ==
- Upazilas of Bangladesh
- Districts of Bangladesh
- Divisions of Bangladesh
