= Kalai Upazila =

Kalai Upazila কালাই উপজেলা
- Upazila of Bangladesh
- Coordinates: 25°3.5′N 89°11′E
- Country: Bangladesh
- Division: Rajshahi
- District: Joypurhat

Area
  - Total: 166.29 km^{2} (64.20 sq mi)

Population (2022)
  - Total: 146,055
  - Density: 878.31/km^{2} (2,274.8/sq mi)
- Time zone: UTC+6 (BST)
- Postal code: 5930

Kalai Upazila (Bengali: কালাই উপজেলা) is an upazila of Joypurhat District in the Division of Rajshahi, Bangladesh.

== Geography ==
Kalai is located at 25.0583°N 89.1833°E. It has 38,745 households and total area 166.29 km^{2}.

== Demographics ==
Religions in Kalai Upazila (2022)
Religion	Percent
Islam	95.31%
Hinduism	4.56%
Other or not stated	0.13%

According to the 2022 Bangladeshi census, Kalai Upazila had 42,695 households and a population of 146,055. 7.39% of the population were under 5 years of age. Kalai had a literacy rate (age 7 and over) of 69.82%: 74.19% for males and 65.64% for females, and a sex ratio of 96.44 males for every 100 females. 36,234 (24.81%) lived in urban areas.

According to the 2011 Census of Bangladesh, Kalai Upazila had 38,745 households and a population of 143,197. 26,847 (18.75%) were under 10 years of age. Kalai had a literacy rate (age 7 and over) of 49.82%, compared to the national average of 51.8%, and a sex ratio of 1021 females per 1000 males. 16,464 (11.50%) lived in urban areas.

As of the 1991 Bangladesh census, Kalai has a population of 114183. Males constitute 50.86% of the population, and females 49.14%. This Upazila's eighteen up population is 60864. Kalai has an average literacy rate of 23.5% (7+ years), and the national average of 32.4% literate.

== Administration ==
Kalai Upazila mauza geocode map

Kalai Upazila is divided into Kalai Municipality and five union parishads: Ahammedabad, Matrai, Punot, Udaipur, and Zindarpur. The union parishads are subdivided into 109 mauzas and 148 villages.

Kalai Municipality is subdivided into 9 wards and 34 mahallas.

== Archaeology ==
Swadhin Sen identified 6 early medieval (6th/7th century or later) archaeological sites in Kalai upazila: Salgun, Haitor, Duranju, Borai, Baligram, and Kusumsara Roair. The largest of these is Baligram, with an area of 319 hectares. The sites of Haitor, Duranju, Borai, and Kusumsara Roair are all clustered together on the left bank of the Katahari river, while a very small channel remnant to the north of the Baligram site indicates that it was also connected to the Katahari. All six sites are located on fluvial terrace as opposed to floodplain.

== Education ==
The famous educational institutions of this Upazila are:

- Kalai Degree College
- Govt. Kalai Women's Degree College
- Hatior Bahumukhi Fazil Madrasah
- Kalai M.U. Government High School
- Kalai Girls' High School
- Omar Kindergarten School
- Punat High School
- Punat Girls' High School
- Shanti Nagar Adarsha High School

== See also ==
- Upazilas of Bangladesh
- Districts of Bangladesh
- Divisions of Bangladesh
