= Joypurhat =

Joypurhat জয়পুরহাট
- City
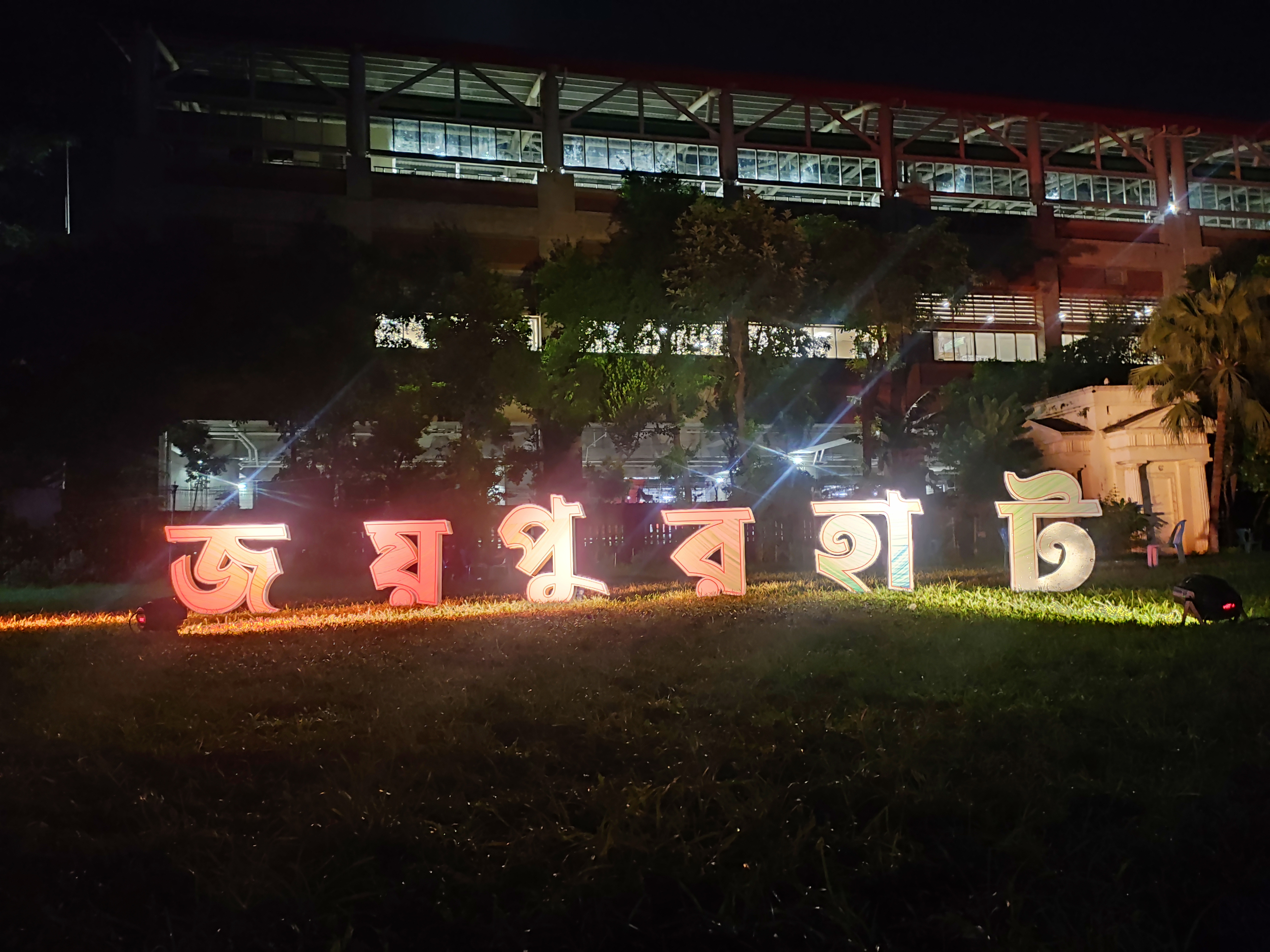

- Location in Bangladesh Joypurhat (Bangladesh)
- Coordinates: 25°06′00″N 89°01′26″E
- Country: Bangladesh
- Division: Rajshahi
- District: Joypurhat
- Upazila: Joypurhat Sadar
- Pala Empire: 810-850
- Joypurhat Municipality: 1975

Government
  - Type: Mayor Council
  - Body: Joypurhat Municipality

Area
  - Total: 18.55 km^{2} (7.16 sq mi)

Population (2022)
  - Total: 84,910
  - Density: 4,577/km^{2} (11,860/sq mi)

Joypurhat Municipality mahallah geocode map

Joypurhat is a city in northwestern Bangladesh, near the border with India. It is the headquarters of Joypurhat District. One of the largest sugermill in Bangladesh, known as Joypurhat Sugarmills Limited and Bangladesh's only mineral and metallurgical research center known as Institute of Mining, Mineralogy and Metallurgy (IMMM), BCSIR. Joypurhat is located in Joypurhat city. The economy of Joypurhat city depends on agriculture, poultry industry, small and medium industries. The famous tourist spot Paharpur Buddha Bihar is only 13.2 km away from Joypurhat city.

== Demographics ==
Religions in Joypurhat city (2011)
Religion	Percent
Islam	87.54%
Hinduism	11.22%
Christianity	0.63%
Other or not stated	0.61%

According to the 2022 Bangladesh census, Joypurhat city had a population of 84,910 and a literacy rate of 86.04%.

According to the 2011 Bangladesh census, Joypurhat city had 16,843 households and a population of 69,033. 11,537 (16.71%) were under 10 years of age. Joypurhat had a literacy rate (age 7 and over) of 77.92%, compared to the national average of 51.8%, and a sex ratio of 957 females per 1000 males. The ethnic population was 1,204 (1.74%).
