= Chilahati–Parbatipur–Santahar–Darshana line =

Railway line in Bangladesh

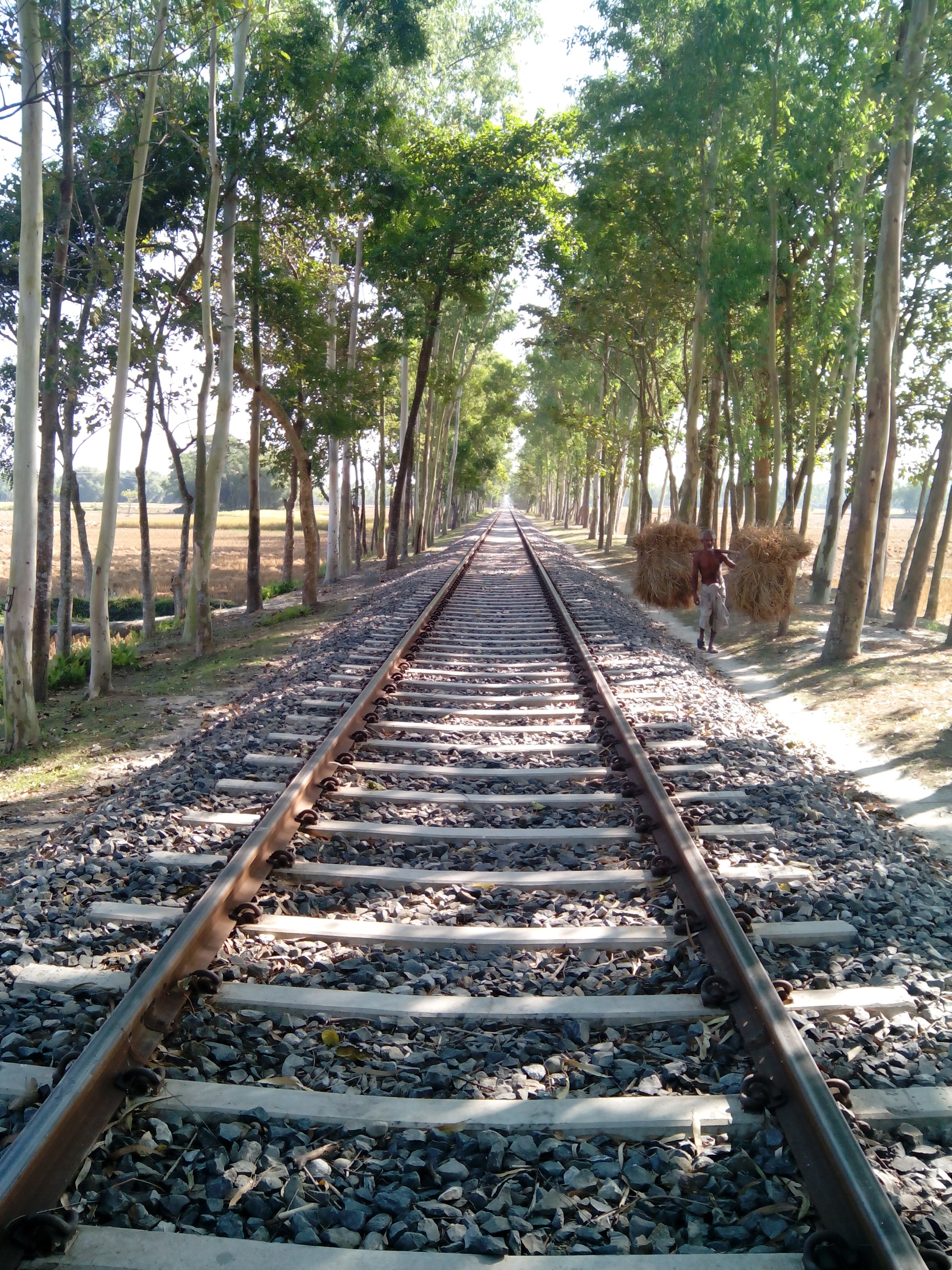
- Chilahati–Parbatipur–Santahar–Darshana line in Nilphamari

Overview
- Status: Operational
- Owner: Bangladesh Railway
- Locale: Bangladesh
- Termini: Chilahati; Darshana
- Stations: 66

History
- Opened: 1878

Technical
- Line length: 360 kilometres (220 mi)
- Number of tracks: 1 or 2
- Track gauge: 5 ft 6 in (1,676 mm) broad gauge converted to Dual gauge between Iswardi & Saidpur 1,676 mm (5 ft 6 in) & 1,000 mm (3 ft 3 3/8 in)
- Old gauge: 1,000 mm (3 ft 3 3/8 in) in Siliguri - Santahar
- Operating speed: 80km/h

The Chilahati–Parbatipur–Santahar–Darshana line is a railway line connecting Chilahati and Darshana, via Parbatipur Junction, Santahar, Abdulpur, Iswardi and Hardinge Bridge in Bangladesh. This track is under the jurisdiction of Bangladesh Railway.

== History ==
From 1878, the railway route from Kolkata, then called Calcutta, to Siliguri was in two laps. The first lap was a 184.9 kilometres (114.9 mi) journey along the Eastern Bengal State Railway from Calcutta Station (later renamed Sealdah) to Damookdeah Ghat on the southern bank of the Padma River, then across the river in a ferry and the second lap of the journey. A 363.1 kilometres (225.6 mi) metre gauge line of the North Bengal Railway linked Saraghat on the northern bank of the Padma to Siliguri.

The 1.849 kilometres (1.149 mi) long Hardinge Bridge across the Padma came up in 1912. In 1916 the metre-gauge section north of the bridge was converted to broad gauge, and so the entire Calcutta - Siliguri route became broad-gauge.

With the partition of India in 1947, the portions of the track in East Pakistan territory, later Bangladesh territory in 1971, got separated. The southern portion through Gede is still functional and Maitree Express runs to Kolkata on this track. In the north the Chilahati–Haldibari 5.4 kilometres (3.4 mi) long section has started operation after 55 years. As of 2010, the 72.9 kilometres (45.3 mi) long Chilahati - Parbatipur line was re-laid to connect Siliguri with Dhaka.

== Branch lines ==
=== Ishwardi–Rooppur ===
In 2018, it was planned to construct a railway station at Rooppur to transport its components and cargo to Rooppur Nuclear Power Plant. The planned branch line from Ishwardi Bypass railway station to Rooppur railway station was planned to rehabilitate existing 17.52 km and construct 9 km dual-gauge track. The deadline for this ৳335.97 crore railway line construction project was fixed in 2020. The construction of the line started in April of the same year but could not be completed on time due to the COVID-19 pandemic. Later, the deadline was pushed back to 2022. Sheikh Hasina inaugurated this branch line on 9 February 2023.

=== Sara–Sirajganj ===
Sara–Sirajganj Railway Company constructed the 81 kilometres (50 mi) Sara–Sirajganj line in 1915–16.

=== Santahar–Fulchhari ===
The Brahmaputra–Sultanpur Railway Company constructed the 99 kilometres (62 mi) long metre-gauge railway track from Santahar to Fulchhari (Tistamukh) in 1899–1900. Presently the line is up to Balashi Ghat in Phulchhari Upazila. The 44 kilometres (27 mi) long Bonarpara-Kaunia line was constructed in 1905.

=== Kaunia–Dharla ===
North Bengal state railway opened a metre gauge line to Kaunia in 1879. Two narrow gauge lines were laid by Eastern Bengal Railway from Kaunia to Dharla River, thereby creating the Kaunia–Dharlla State Railway. The Kaunia Dharla railway lines were converted to metre gauge in 1901, a 581 kilometres (361 mi) long Katihar - Amingaon line was made, connecting Assam with Bengal.
