= Naogaon-1 =

Constituency of Bangladesh's Jatiya Sangsad

- Constituency for the Jatiya Sangsad
- District: Naogaon District
- Division: Rajshahi Division
- Electorate: 450,951 (2026)

Current constituency
- Created: 1984
- Party: Bangladesh Nationalist Party
- Member: Md. Mostafizur Rahman
- ← 45 Chapai Nawabganj-3 47 Naogaon-2 →

Naogaon-1 is a constituency represented in the Jatiya Sangsad (National Parliament) of Bangladesh since 2026 by Md. Mostafizur Rahman of the Bangladesh Nationalist Party.

== Boundaries ==
The constituency encompasses Porsha, Niamatpur, and Sapahar upazilas.

== History ==
The constituency was created in 1984 from a Rajshahi constituency when the former Rajshahi District was split into four districts: Nawabganj, Naogaon, Rajshahi, and Natore.

== Members of Parliament ==
Election	Member	Party
1986	Md. Azizur Rahman Miah	Awami League
1988	AKM Fazlul Haque	Jatiya Party
1991	Md. Azizur Rahman Miah	Awami League
1996	Salek Chowdhury	Bangladesh Nationalist Party
2001	Salek Chowdhury	Bangladesh Nationalist Party
2008	Sadhan Chandra Majumder	Awami League
2026	Md. Mostafizur Rahman	Bangladesh Nationalist Party
