= Sadhan Chandra Majumder =

Bangladeshi politician

- সাধন চন্দ্র মজুমদার
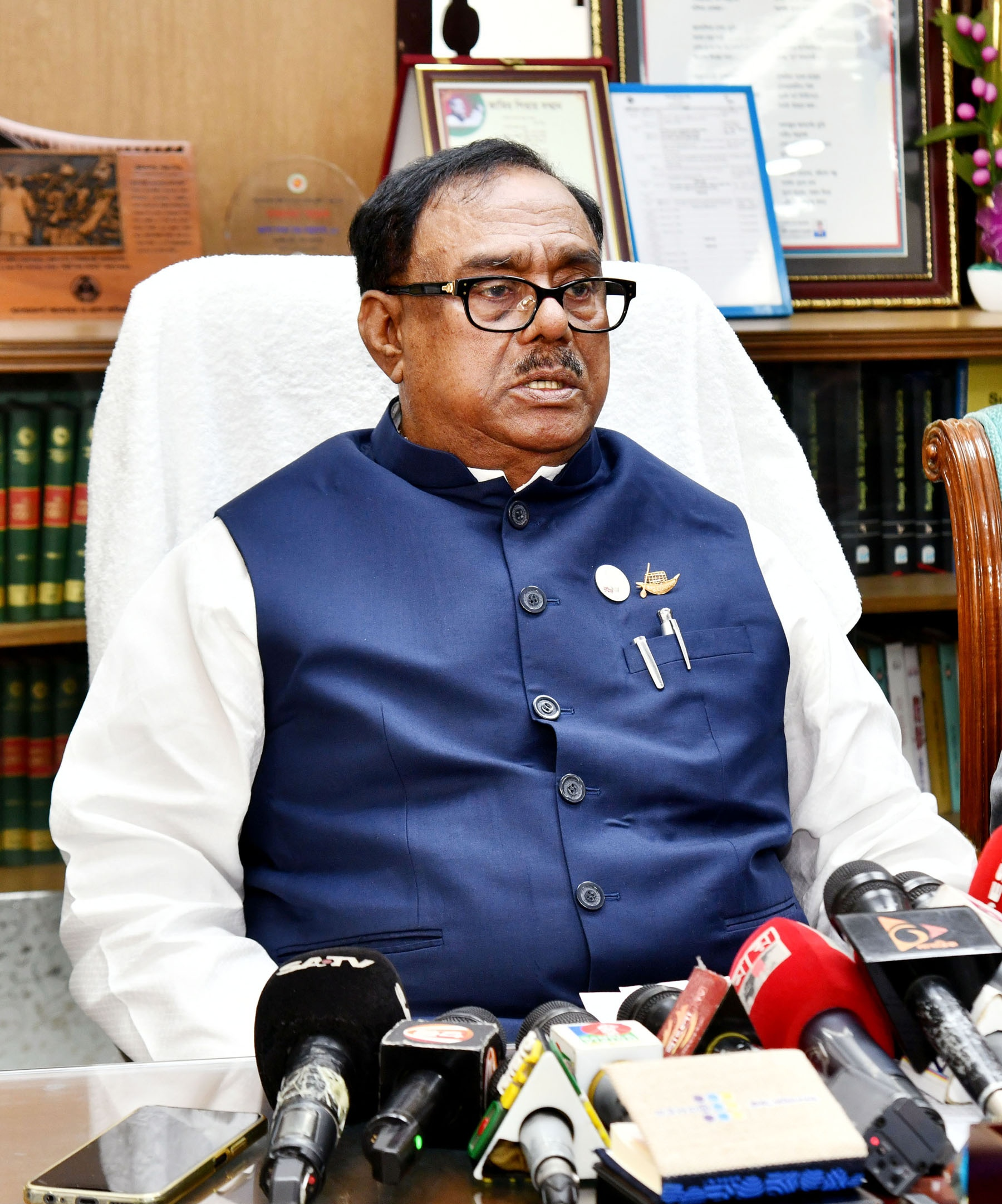
- Majumder in 2024

Minister of Food
- In office 7 January 2019 – 6 August 2024
- Prime Minister: Sheikh Hasina
- Preceded by: Qamrul Islam

Member of the Bangladesh Parliament for Naogaon-1
- In office 25 January 2009 – 6 August 2024
- Preceded by: Salek Chowdhury
- Succeeded by: Md. Mostafizur Rahman

Personal details
- Born: 17 July 1950 (age 76) Shibpur, East Bengal, Pakistan
- Party: Bangladesh Awami League
- Spouse: Chandana Majumder (m. 1993)
- Children: 4

Sadhan Chandra Majumder (born 17 July 1950) is a Bangladeshi politician who served as the minister of food during 2019–2024 and a former member of Jatiya Sangsad representing the Naogaon-1 constituency during 2009–2024.

== Early life ==
Majumder was born on 17 July 1950 in at Shibpur, East Bengal, Pakistan (now in Niamatpur Upazila, Bangladesh). His father, Kamini Kumar Majumder, was the headmaster of Shibpur Government Primary School. Kamini died when Sadhan was studying in sixth grade. Besides being a teacher, he was also a farmer and sold rice for a living. His mother, Sabitri Bala Majumder, was a housewife. He has eight siblings in his family. He received a Bachelor of Arts degree from Naogaon Government College. After graduating, he started working as a farmer.

== Political career ==
While studying at college, Majumder became a member of the Chhatra League (the youth wing of the Awami League) in 1967. In 1984, he was elected chairman of Hajinagar Union. Five years later, he was elected chairman of Niamatpur Upazila Parishad.

Majumder lost to Chhalek Choudhury of the Bangladesh National Party in the 1996 and 2001 general elections from the Naogaon-1 constituency. In the 2008, he defeated Choudhury and was elected to the 9th Jatiya Sangsad for the first time ever. In the following year, he became a member of a committee that was formed to probe corruption in Barind development works. He served as a member of the Standing Committee on Religious Affairs in the 10th Jatiya Sangsad. In 2018, he was elected to the parliament for the third time. He defeated his nearest rival Mustafizur Rahman by a margin of 46,228 votes.

On 7 January 2019, Majumder took the oath as food minister of Bangladesh. He became the first person from Niamatpur Upazila to become a cabinet minister.

On 3 October 2024, Majumder was arrested by the Detective Branch of Dhaka Metropolitan Police in Dhaka's Bashundhara Residential Area. He was placed on seven-day remand.

== Personal life ==
Majumder was married to Chandana Majumder since (d. 1993). They have four daughters.
