= AKM Fazlul Haque (Jatiya Party politician) =

Bangladeshi politician

- এ কে এম ফজলুুল হক

Member of Parliament for Naogaon-1
- In office 1988–1990
- Preceded by: Md. Azizur Rahman Miah
- Succeeded by: Md. Azizur Rahman Miah

Personal details
- Born: Naogaon District
- Party: Jatiya Party

AKM Fazlul Haque is a politician of Naogaon District of Bangladesh, and a former member of parliament for the Naogaon-1 constituency in 1988.

== Career ==
Haque was elected to parliament for Naogaon-1 as an independent candidate in 1988.
