= Md. Mostafizur Rahman (Naogaon politician) =

Bangladeshi politician (born 1963)

- মোঃ মোস্তাফিজুর রহমান

Member of the Bangladesh Parliament for Naogaon-1
- Incumbent
- Assumed office 17 February 2026
- Preceded by: Sadhan Chandra Majumder

Personal details
- Born: 1 July 1963 (age 63) Niamatpur Upazila, Naogaon District
- Party: Bangladesh Nationalist Party

Md. Mostafizur Rahman (born 1 July 1963) is a Bangladeshi politician of the Bangladesh Nationalist Party. He is a member of parliament from Naogaon-1.

== Early life ==
Rahman was born on 1 July 1963 in Niamatpur Upazila in Naogaon District.
