= R. C. Hazra =

Indian scholar (1905–1982)

Rajendra Chandra Hazra (1905–10 May 1982) was a scholar and Sanskritist known for his studies of Puranic literature (the Puranas and the Upapuranas). During an academic career spanning over four decades he wrote about 10 books and over 200 research articles on subjects ranging from his central interest in Smriti literature to "the Vedas, Vyākaraṇas, Kāvya, anthology, archaeology, world-history, paleography, and the Nyāya and Vaiśeṣika systems of philosophy."

== Biography ==
Hazra was born in 1905 in the village of Dogachi in what was then the Dacca District in Bengal and is now in Bangladesh. After being a star-pupil during his schooling years, he obtained a B.A. and M.A. in Sanskrit from Dacca University in 1929 and 1931, respectively; standing first class first at both stages. He earned a PhD in 1936 under the guidance of S. K. De, while working as a lecturer in Sanskrit and Bengali at the Jagannath Intermediate College. His thesis, Studies in the Purāṇic Records on Hindu Rites and Custom was published as a book in 1940 by Dacca University. Hazra obtained a D. Litt in 1940 with his Studies in the Upapuranas, which was incompletely published as a series of books by Munshiram Manoharlal with permission of the then Principal of the Calcutta Sanskrit College and is considered by some to be his magnum opus.

From 1939 to 1951, Hazra worked at Dacca University, where he rose to be the head of the Department of Sanskrit. During this period he, along with fellow faculty-member, R. C. Majumdar, aided revolutionaries fighting for Indian independence from British rule by giving them shelter in the university's Dacca Hall, where Hazra was the provost. Earlier, Hazra had qualified for the Indian Police Service but was refused appointment due to his connection with the revolutionaries.

Hazra migrated to India in 1951 and joined the Department of Post-Graduate Studies at Sanskrit College, Calcutta. There he served as the professor of Smriti and Puranas till his retirement in 1972. Hazra worked closely with the Bhandarkar Oriental Research Institute, Calcutta's Asiatic Society, Ganganath Jha Research Institute, Ramakrishna Mission Institute of Culture and the Sahitya Akademi, and collaborated with Sanskritists and historians S. K. De, R. C. Majumdar, P. V. Kane, U. N. Ghoshal, A. D. Pulaskar, V. Raghavan, Suniti Kumar Chatterji, among others. He was elected a fellow of The Asiatic Society in 1964 and later awarded its S. C. Chakravorty Medal for "outstanding contribution in Ancient Indian Language with special reference to Smriti and Purana" and its Naresh Ch. Sengupta Medal.

== Bibliography ==
Books

- Studies in the Purāṇic Records on Hindu Rites and Custom, Motilal Banarsidass, 1940.
- Studies in the Upapurāṇas, Vol I (Saura and Vaiṣṇava Upapurāṇas), Munshiram Manoharlal, 1958.
- Studies in the Upapurāṇas, Vol II (Śākta and Non-sectarian Upapurāṇas), Munshiram Manoharlal, 1963.
- Studies in the Upapurāṇas, Vol III (Ṣaiva and Gāṇapatya Upapurāṇas), unpublished, manuscript available.
- Studies in the Upapurāṇas, Vol IV, unpublished, manuscript available.
- Studies in the Upapurāṇas, Vol V, unpublished, manuscript available.
- Edited: Śava-sūtakāśauca-prakaraṇa of Bhaṭṭa Bhavadeva, Sanskrit College Research Series, 1959.
- Edited with S. K. De: Sāhitya-ratna-kośa, Part II Purāṇetihāsa-saṃgraha (An anthology of the Epics and Puranas), Sahitya Akedemi, 1959.
- Edited with S. K. De, U. N. Ghoshal, A. D. Pulaskar: The cultural heritage of India, Volume II, Ramakrishna Mission Institute of Culture, 1962.
- Edited: Kṛtya-Tattvārṇava, Part 1, Asiatic Society, Calcutta, 1975.
- Kṛtya-Tattvārṇava, Part 2, unpublished.
- Rise of Epic and Purāṇic Rudra-Śiva Or Śiva Maheśvara
- Studies in Smr̥ti Śāstra
- Rudra in the R̥g-Veda
- The Problems relating to the Śiva-purāṇa

Collected research articles

- Dr. R. C. Hazra Commemoration Volume, Part I (Puranic and Vedic Studies), All-India Kshiraj Trust, 1985; incomplete.
- Dr. R. C. Hazra Commemoration Volume, Part II (Dharmaśāstra, Sanskrit literature, Vyākaraṇa), unpublished.
