= Mohadevpur Upazila =

Mohadevpur Upazila মহাদেবপুর উপজেলা
- Upazila of Bangladesh
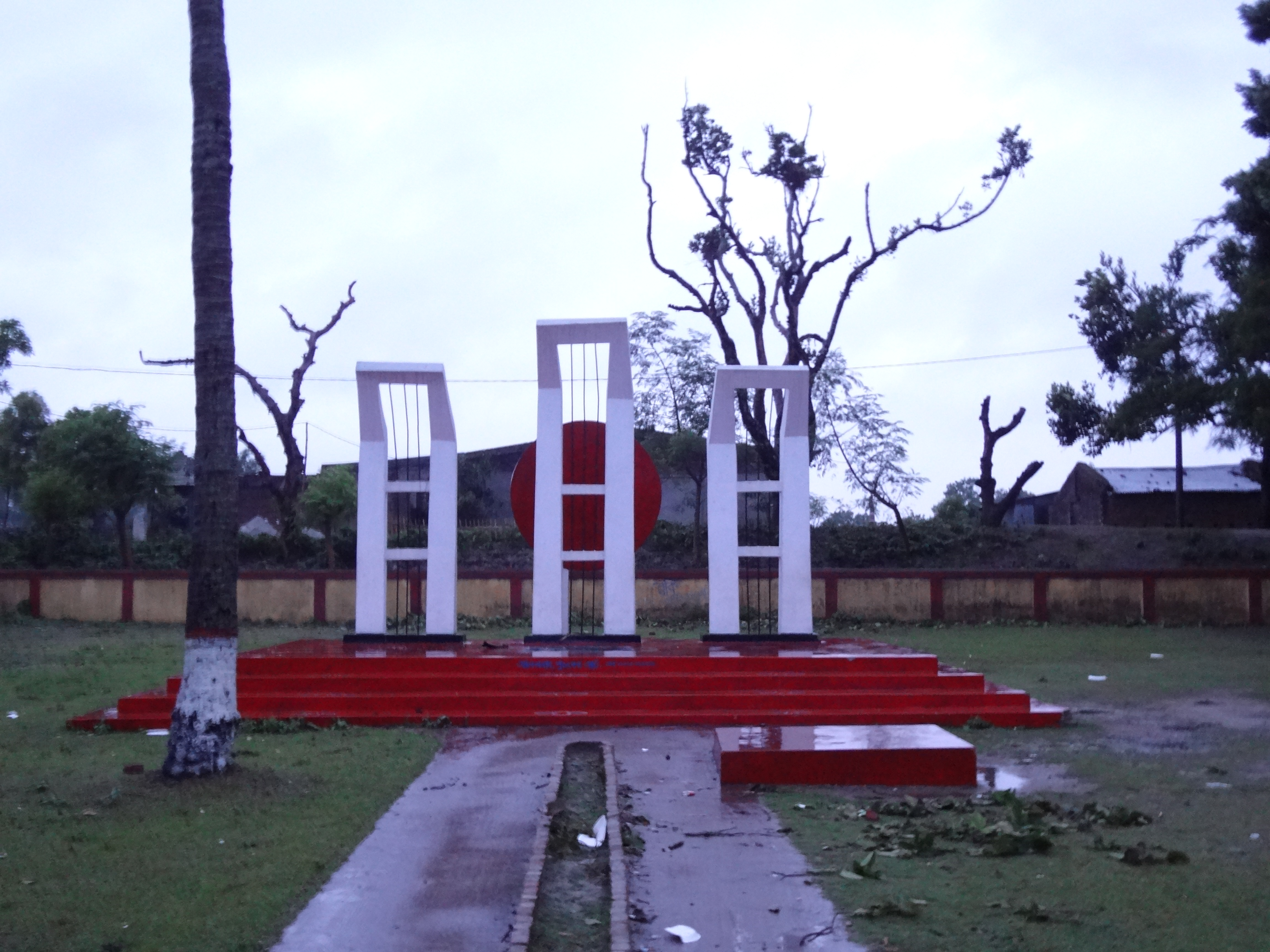
- Kendriya Shahid Minar in Mohadevpur

- Coordinates: 24°55.1′N 88°44.9′E
- Country: Bangladesh
- Division: Rajshahi
- District: Naogaon

Area
  - Total: 397.66 km^{2} (153.54 sq mi)

Population (2022)
  - Total: 308,666
  - Density: 776.21/km^{2} (2,010.4/sq mi)
- Time zone: UTC+6 (BST)
- Postal code: 6530
- Area code: 07426
- Website: mohadevpur.naogaon.gov.bd

Mohadevpur Upazila (Bengali: মহাদেবপুর উপজেলা) is an upazila of Naogaon in the Division of Rajshahi, Bangladesh.

== History ==
Mahadevpur Zamindari was established during the time of Mughal emperor Jahangir (1605–1627). Nayanchandra Rai Chowdhury was the founder of the zamindari. His early habitation was in Bardhaman, West Bengal. Nayanchandra Raichowdhury or his successor Bireshwar Raichowdhury believed to have received the Jagir of pargana Jahangirabad from emperor Jahangir as a reward for assisting the Mughals to invade Bangla. Later this jagir turned as an immense zamindari and it was renamed as Jahangirpur after the name of the emperor.

Bireshwar Raichowdhury was noted as a good administrator. For the welfare of the people, he constructed temples and excavated ponds in his zamindari vicinity. After the death of Bireshwar Raichowdhury, his estate was divided between his four sons and a cousin brother named Laxmikanta Raichowdhury. After the death of Laxmikanta, his son Brajanath Raichowdhury succeeded him. In his lifetime Brajanath divided his estate equally between his two sons, Durganath Raichowdhury and Govindanath Raichowdhury. Govindanath was an influential, kind-hearted and learned zamindar. After his death his son Shaymanath Raichowdhury succeeded him as the next zamindar of Mahadevpur.'

Shaymanath Raichowdhury was a philanthropist zamindar. He established a school and a hospital in Mahadevpur and contributed financial aid regularly for the maintenance of those institutions. He contributed a huge amount of money for establishing a printing press in Dinajpur city and during the famine of 1874, he donated more than 15000 taka for the relief committees of Bengal. Besides, Shaymanath bequeathed lands for the construction of roads, spent huge amount of money for establishing new schools and for arranging wedding ceremony of the poor Brahmins youths of Bengal.

Shaymanath Raichowdhury died at 24 in 1878. The successors of Mahadevpur were Khitishchandra Raichowdhury of Barataraf and Raibahadur Narayanchandra Raichowdhury of Chhotataraf. Narayanchandra Raichowdhury was noted as a scholar and a philanthropist zamindar. He established Mata Sharbamongoladevi High School at Mahadevpur in 1921. The zamindari was abolished under the East Bengal state acquisition and tenancy act of 1950. Jahangirpur College was established in 1967 within the Mahadevpur palace, which happened to be now a government College.

== Geography ==
Map of Naogaon District

Mohadevpur is located at 24.9333°N 88.7417°E. It has a total area of 397.66 km^{2} and it is bounded by Patnitala on the north, Manda and Naogaon Sadar upazilas on the south, Badalgachhi and Naogaon Sadar upazilas on the east and Niamatpur and Porsha upazilas on the west. Main river is Atrai.

Mahadevpur Upazila consists of 3,06 mouzas. The area of the town is 40.46 km^{2}.

== Demographics ==
Religions in Mahadevpur Upazila (2022)
Religion	Percent
Islam	79.64%
Hinduism	17.89%
Other or not stated	2.47%

According to the 2022 Bangladeshi census, Mahadebpur Upazila had 86,611 households and a population of 308,666. 7.49% of the population were under 5 years of age. Mahadebpur had a literacy rate (age 7 and over) of 73.12%: 75.91% for males and 70.39% for females, and a sex ratio of 98.48 males for every 100 females. 32,873 (10.65%) lived in urban areas. Ethnic population was 18,195 (5.89%), of which Munda are 5799, Barman are 5631 and Oraon are 4548.

Population of upazila by ethnicity (2022)
1. Bengali (94.1%)
2. Munda (1.88%)
3. Barman (1.82%)
4. Oraon (1.47%)
5. Others (0.72%)

According to the 2011 Census of Bangladesh, Mahadevpur Upazila had 76,089 households and a population of 292,859. 54,194 (18.51%) were under 10 years of age. Mahadevpur had a literacy rate (age 7 and over) of 49.82%, compared to the national average of 51.8%, and a sex ratio of 994 females per 1000 males. 15,626 (5.34%) lived in urban areas. Ethnic population was 15,389 (5.25%), of which Oraon were 4,939, Santal 2,158 and Barman 1,470.

== Art and culture ==
Cultural organizations: Public libraries 1, rural clubs 15, theatre group 1, cinema halls 3, woman's associations 1, jatra party 1, women welfare associations 1 and playground 30.

=== Public library ===
The only public library of Mohadevpur is situated adjacent to the Upazila Parishad office.

== Economy ==
Main occupations: Agriculture 52.24%, agricultural labourer 29.99%, commerce 7.26%, wage labourer 1.49%, service 2.2%, others 6.82%.

Land use: Agricultural land 30386 hectares; fallow land 375 hectares. Single crop 25%, double crop 41% and treble crop land 34%. Land under irrigation 83%.

Land control: Among the peasants 20% are rich, 24% medium, 30% marginal, 26% landless.

Value of land: Market value of land of first grade is Tk 6,000 per 0.01 hectare.

Tour organization: The only notable tour organization in the upazila is We are fearless.

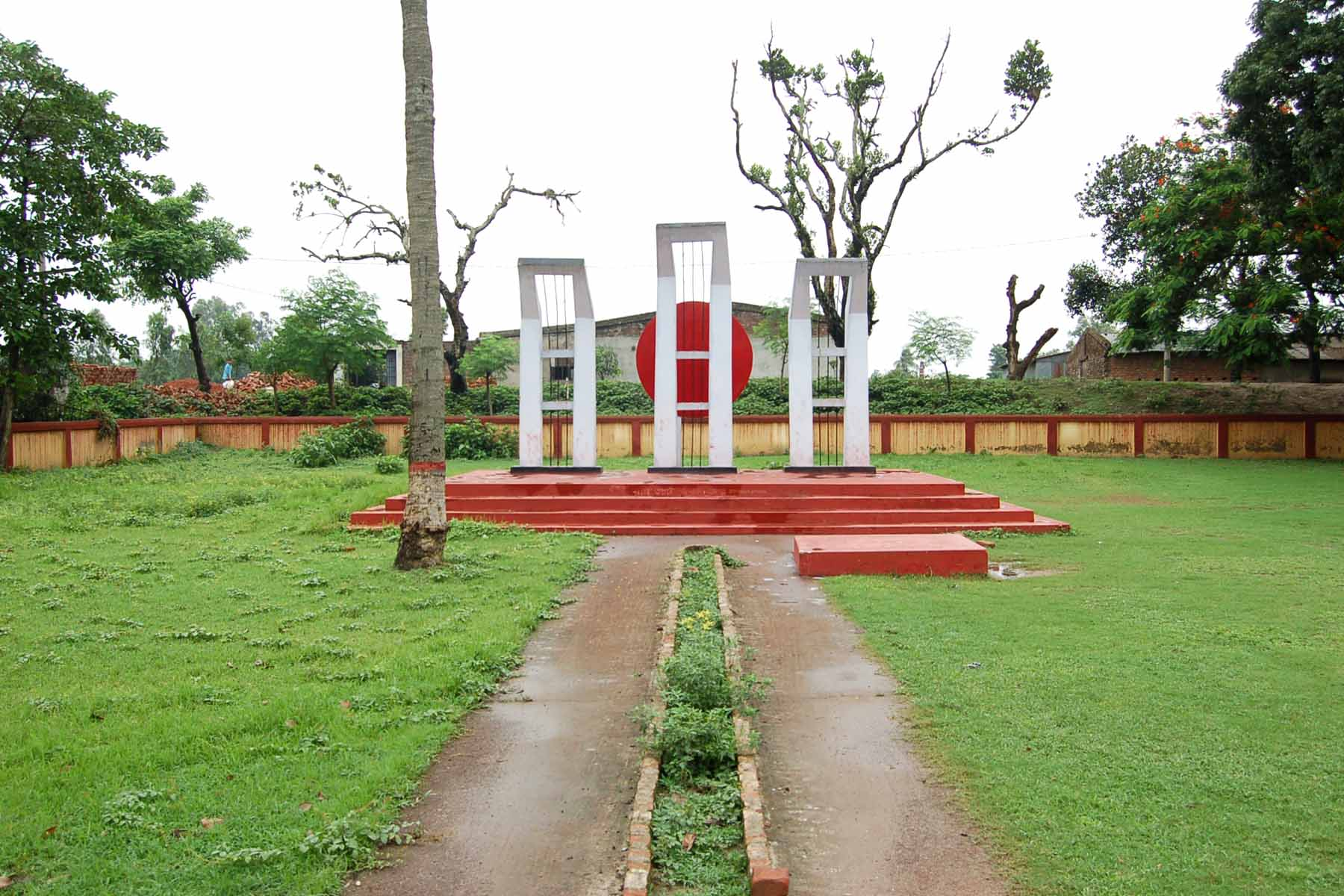
A front view of Mohadevpur Central Shaheed Minar

- Mohadevpur Central Shaheed Minar

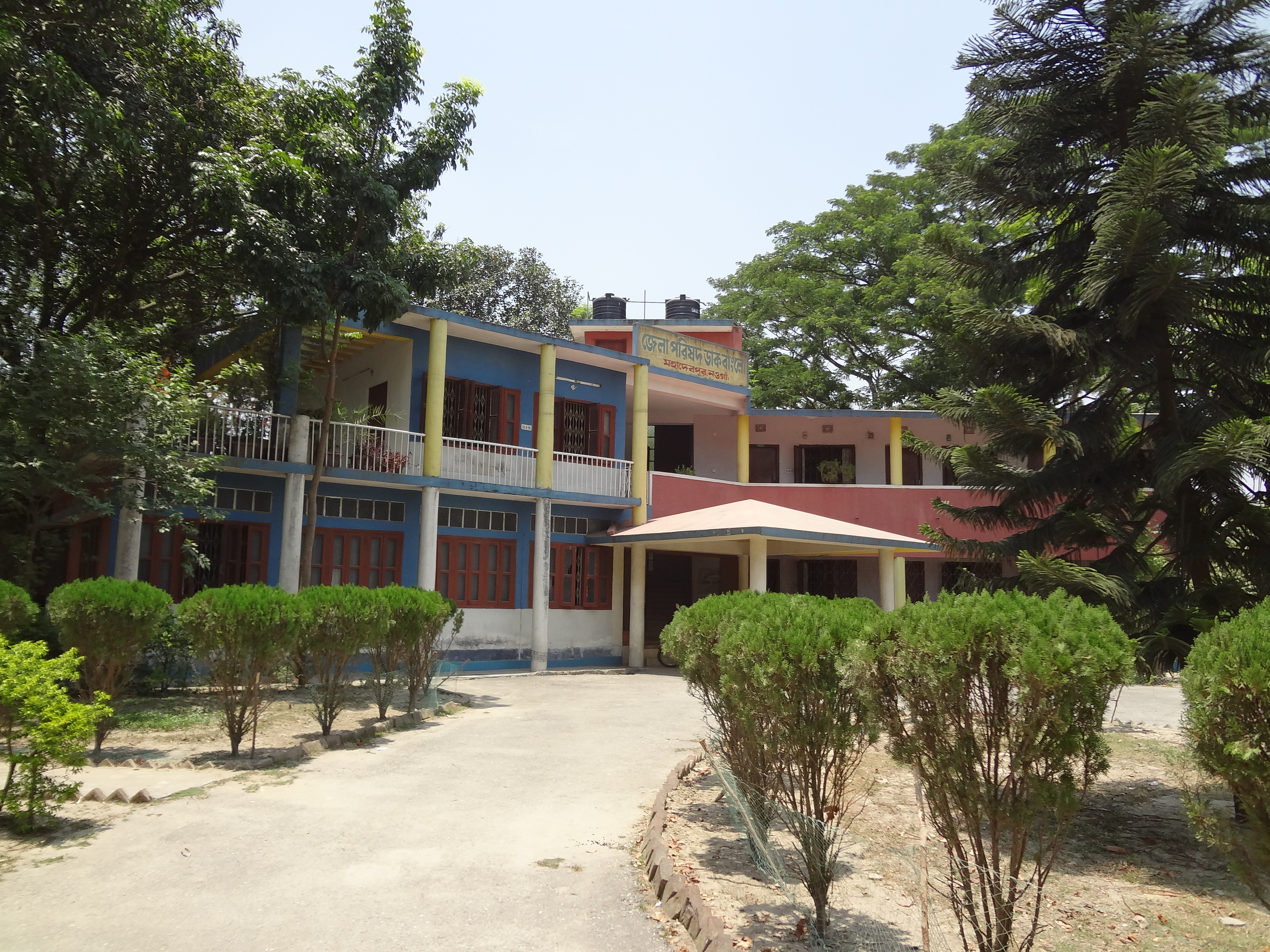
Zila Parishad Dak Banglow, Mohadevpur, Naogaon

- Zila Parishad Dak Banglow
- Mohadevpur Rajbari

== Administration ==
Mahadevpur upazila, primarily established as a Thana in 1898, was turned into upazila on 15 December 1983.

Mahadevpur Upazila is divided into ten union parishads: Bhimpur, Chandas, Cheragpur, Enayetpur, Hatur, Khajur, Mahadevpur, Roygon, Sofapur, and Uttargram. The union parishads are subdivided into 307 mauzas and 301 villages.

=== Government ===
The name of administrative officers; UNO:Abu Hasan

Upazila Chairman: Sayed Hasan (chairman, Mohadevpur UP)

2.(chairman, Hatur UP)

3.Belal Uddin↵(chairman, Khajur UP)

4. (chairman, Chandash UP)

5.Arifur Rahman Sardar↵(chairman, Raigaon UP)

6. Mehedi Hasan Mia↵(chairman, Enayetpur UP)

7.Md. Samsul Alam(Bachu) (chairman, Sofapur UP)

8. Hasan mondol (chairman, Uttargram UP)

9.sibnath misra↵(chairman, Charagpur UP)

10.Ram Prosad Vaddra (chairman, Vimpur UP)

== Health ==
Upazila Health & Family Planning Officer: Dr. Aktharuzzaman Alal

Other Doctors:

1. Dr. Anowarul Islam (Mithu), Eye Consultant 2. Dr. Suvasish Das (Sumon), Assistant Professor, BSMMU 3. Dr. Bibekanondo Ghosh (Opu) 4. Dr. Ranjon Chowdhury 5. Dr. Rakibul Hasan 6. Dr. Prottus Kumar Mondal 7. Dr. Debashis biswas

== Literacy ==
Literacy rate and educational institutions Average literacy 27.4%; male 35.4% and female 19.8%. Educational institutions: college 5, high school 39, government primary school 84, non-government high school 41, madrasa 21, qawmi madrasa 20.

== Education ==
Major educational institutes include:

=== Colleges ===
Name	Founded
Jahangirpur Govt. College	1967
Raigaon College	1972
Jahangirpur Girls School & College	School 1974 & College 1996
Chandash Degree College	1994
Arif Memorial College	2001
Mohadevpur Technical & Business Management College	2001
Matajihat Technical & B.M College	2003
Rodoil Technical & B.M College	2003
Mohadevpur Agricultural & Technical College	2003
Binodpur Akhter Hamid Siddeque Technical & B.M College	2004
Jahangirpur T.B.M College	2005
Mohadevpur (Kunjaban) Technical & Business Management Girls College	2006

=== Secondary schools ===
Serial No.	Name	Founded	Serial No.	Name	Founded
01	Mohadevpur Sarba Mongala (Pilot) High School	1921	27	Mohinagar High School	
02	Jahangirpur Model High School	1983	28	Mohishbathan High School	
03	Raigaon High School		29	Gaholi B.L High School	
04	Khajur U.P High School		30	Belkuri High School	
05	Saraswatipur High School	1940	31	Mortujapur High School	
06	Joypur Dangapara High School	1963	32	Chandash M.S High School	
07	HatChawkgauri High School		33	Bagdob High School	
08	Shibganj High School	1971	34	Kunjaban Bondor Technical Girls High School	
09	Hamidpur Jigatola High School		35	Paharpur J.N Girls High School	
10	Pathakata High School		36	Gongarampur High School	
11	KrishnaGopalpur High School		37	Malahar Girls High School	
12	Bharaduba Akther Hamid Siddique High School	1993	38	Akhter Siddeque Girls High School	
13	Uttargram B.L High School		39	Barendra Bidya Niketon	
14	Rosulpur High School		40	Bhalain Alfatunnesa Memorial High School	
15	Dhonjail High School		41	Bilshikari Lower Secondary School	
16	Shalbari High School		42	Bamonsata Adarsha Lower Secondary School	
17	Jontigram T.A High School		43	Matrimongala Lower Secondary Girls School	
18	Jowanpur B.L High School		44	Chanda Ideal Lower Srcondary School	
19	Bokapur High School		45	Formanpur Lower Secondary School	
20	Daul Barbakpur High School		46	Kanchan Lower Secondary Girls School	
21	Kurail Shere Bangla High School		47	Bagdob Lower Secondary Girls School	
22	Kalushohor High School		48	Chandash Lower Secondary Girls School	
23	Khapur Haji Dhonej Uddin High School		49	Sagoroil Adarsha Lower Secondary School	
24	Deborpur D.N.G High School		50	B.S Lower Secondary School	
25	Bilchara R.C.P High School		51	Moijora Lower Secondary School	
26	Mohadevpur Vocational Training Institute		52	Paharpur Lower Secondary School	

== See also ==
- Upazilas of Bangladesh
- Districts of Bangladesh
- Divisions of Bangladesh
