= Rohanpur =

Town in Chapai Nawabganj District, Rajshahi Division

Rahanpur
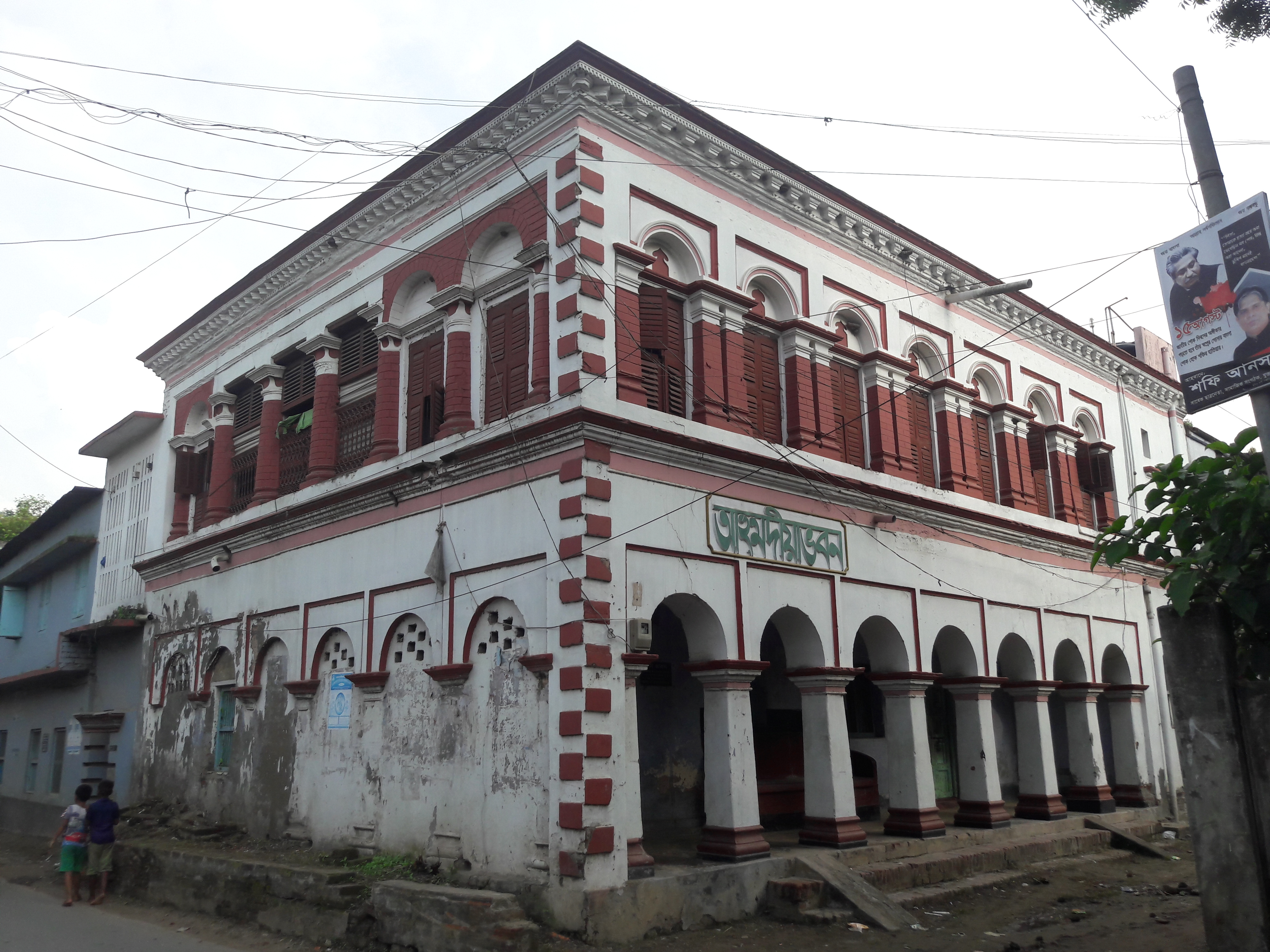
- Rest house of ancient rulers of Rohanpur

- Location in Bangladesh
- Coordinates: 24°49′10″N 88°19′30″E
- Country: Bangladesh
- Division: Rajshahi Division
- District: Chapai Nawabganj District
- Upazila: Gomastapur Upazila

Government
  - Type: Mayor–Council
  - Body: Rahanpur Municipality

Area
  - Total: 23.9 km^{2} (9.2 sq mi)

Population (2011)
  - Total: 58,624
  - Density: 2,450/km^{2} (6,350/sq mi)
- Time zone: UTC+6 (Bangladesh Time)
- Area code: 0781
- National Dialing Code: +880

Rohanpur or Rahanpur is a town and paurashava (municipality) in Chapai Nawabganj District of Rajshahi Division. The town is the headquarter and urban centre of Gomastapur Upazila.
