= Jahangirpur Government College =

- জাহাঙ্গীরপুর সরকারি কলেজ,নওগাঁ
- Jahangirpur Government College Logo

Location
- College Para, Mohadevpur, Naogaon; 24.9243°N 88.7478°E

Information
- Type: Public
- Established: 1967
- Enrollment: 2,000
- Campus type: Urban
- Website: jgcbd.net

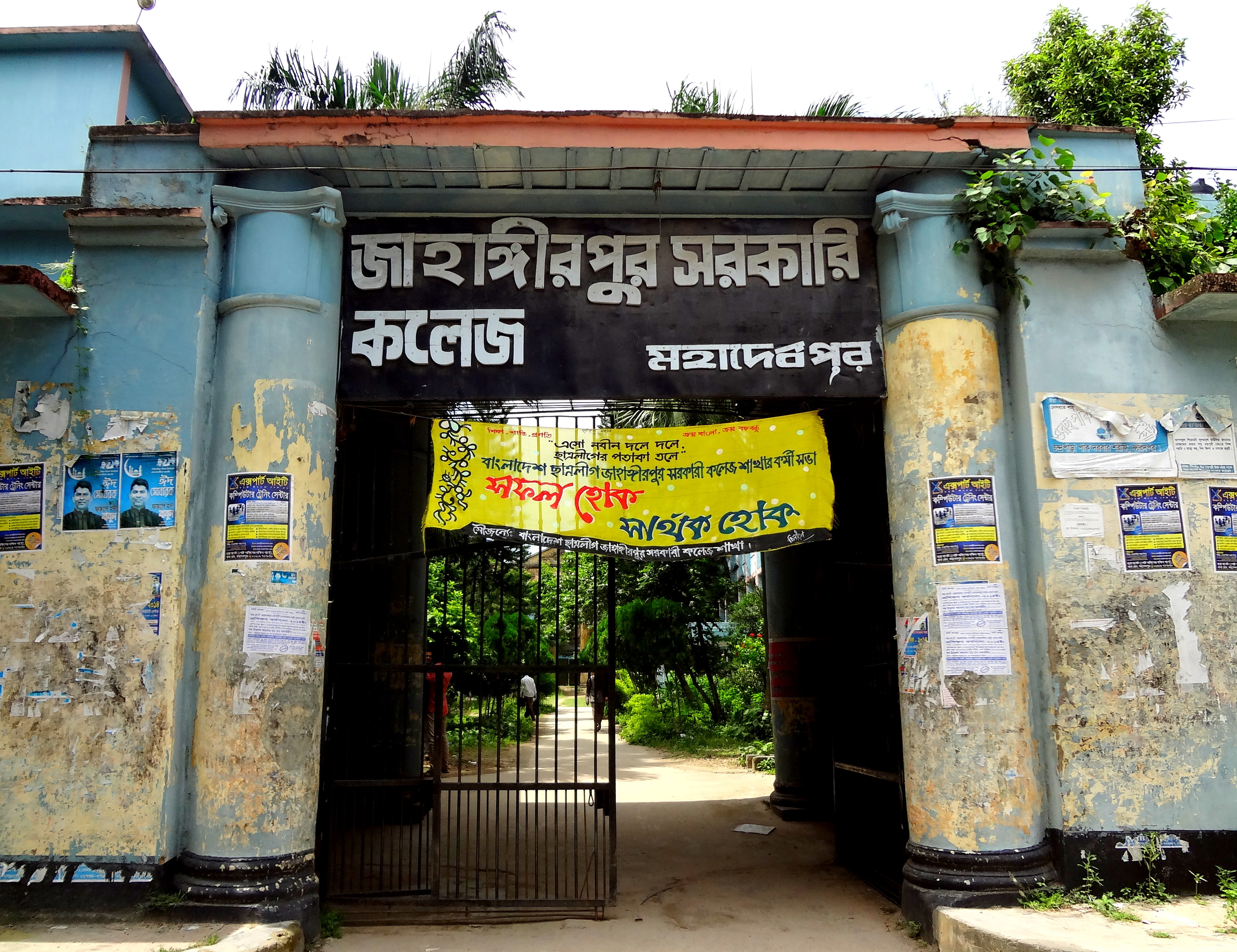
Campus Entrance Gate

Jahangirpur Government College (Bengali: জাহাঙ্গীরপুর সরকারি কলেজ,নওগাঁ) is an institution of higher education in Naogaon, Bangladesh. Established in 1967, and nationalized in 1984, the college was the first government educational institution in Mohadevpur city. It offers three years bachelor and four years honours degree courses in various disciplines. The college is affiliated with the National University. It has enrolled higher secondary students since 1967. The college is situated adjacent to the famous Mohadevpur Rajbari.

== History ==
Jahangirpur College was established in 1967. Khitis Chandra Roy Chowdhury donated his vested property for this college. Its hostel was established in 1969.

The college was nationalized on 9 January 1984. The first principal of this college was Md. Mostafizur Rahman.

=== Language movement ===
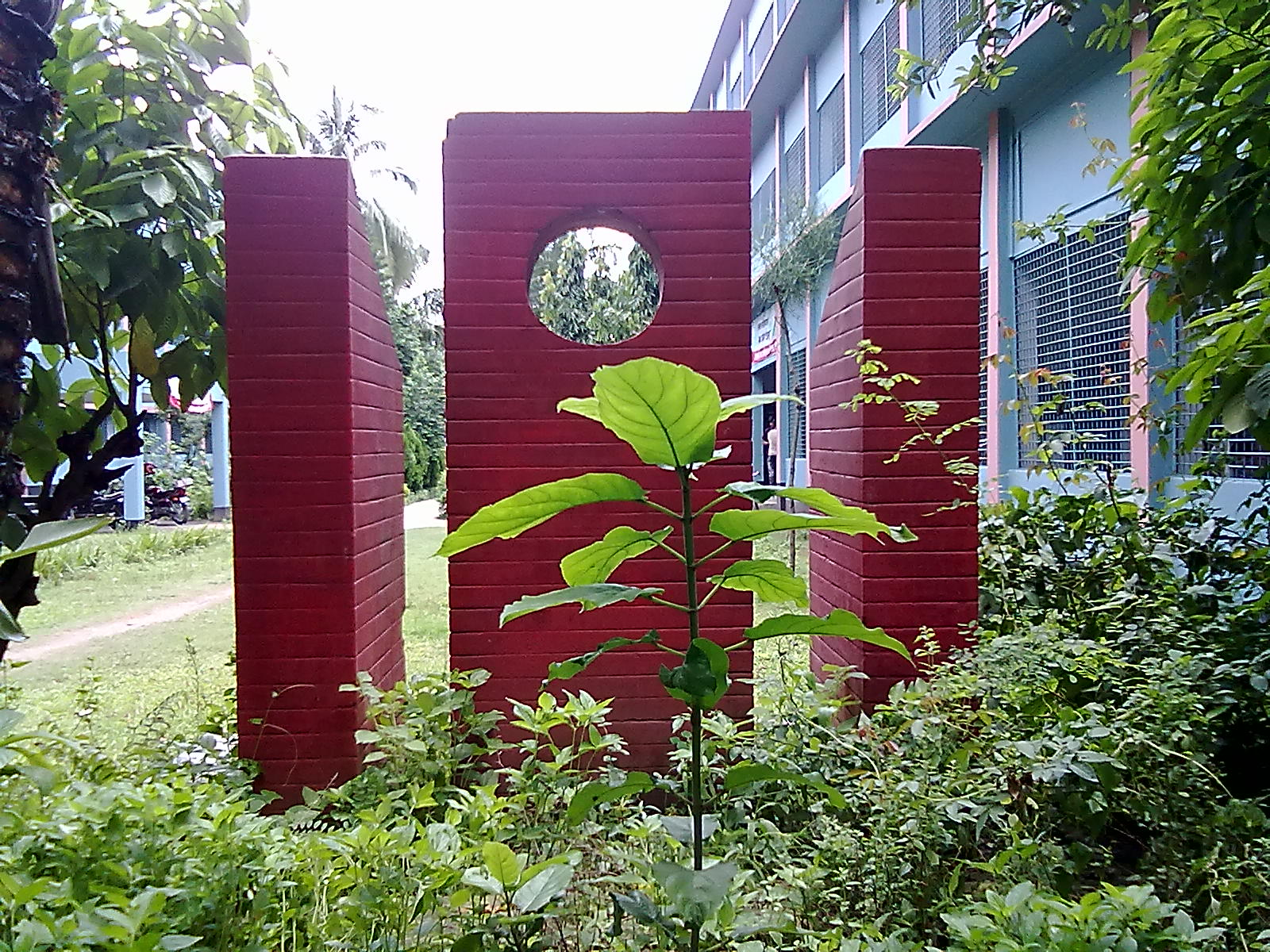
The symbol of language movement

The present monument to the language movement dates from 1973. It was built to replace an earlier monument, built in 1969, that was destroyed by Pakistani forces in 1971.

== Buildings ==
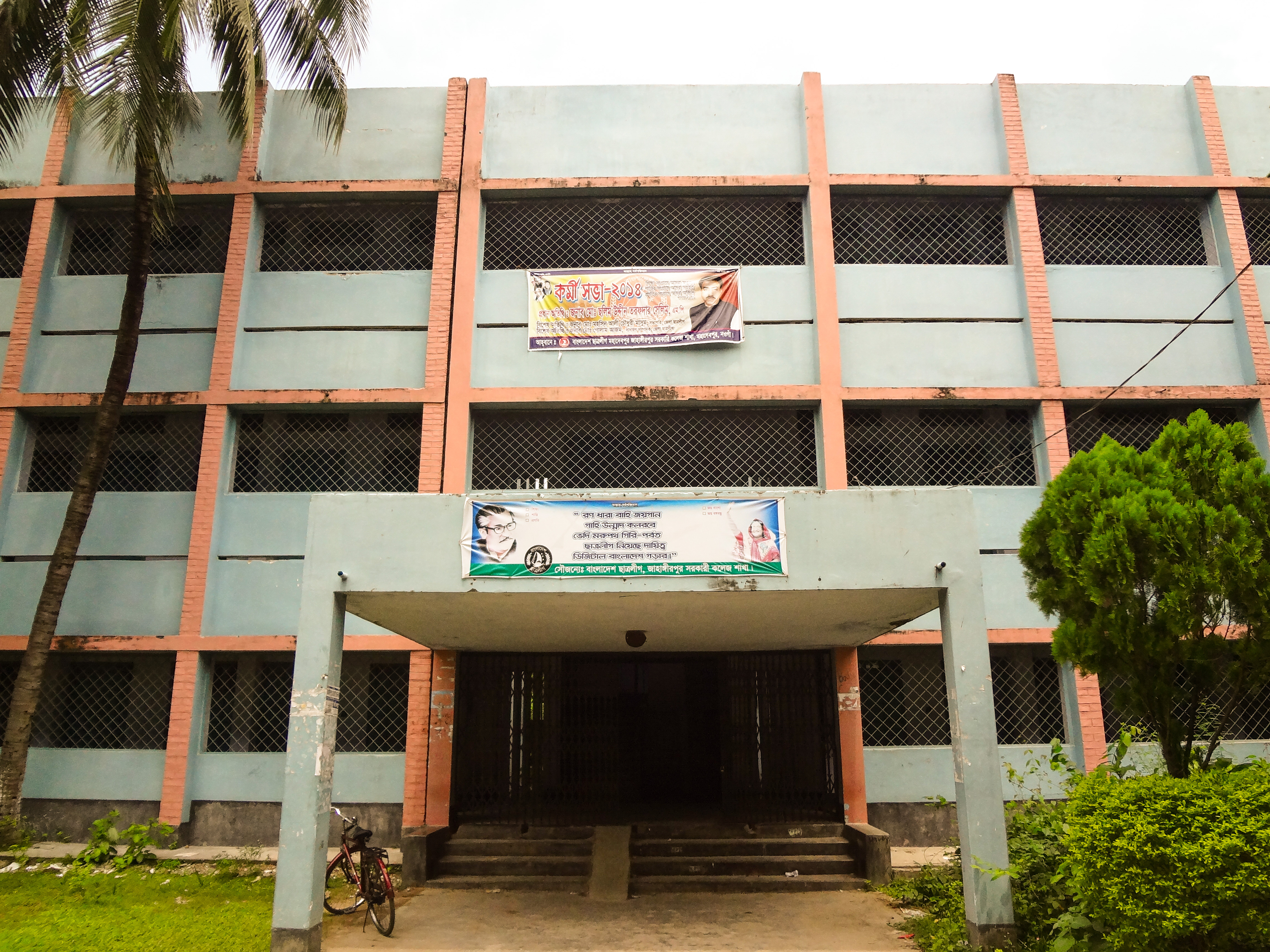
Science Building

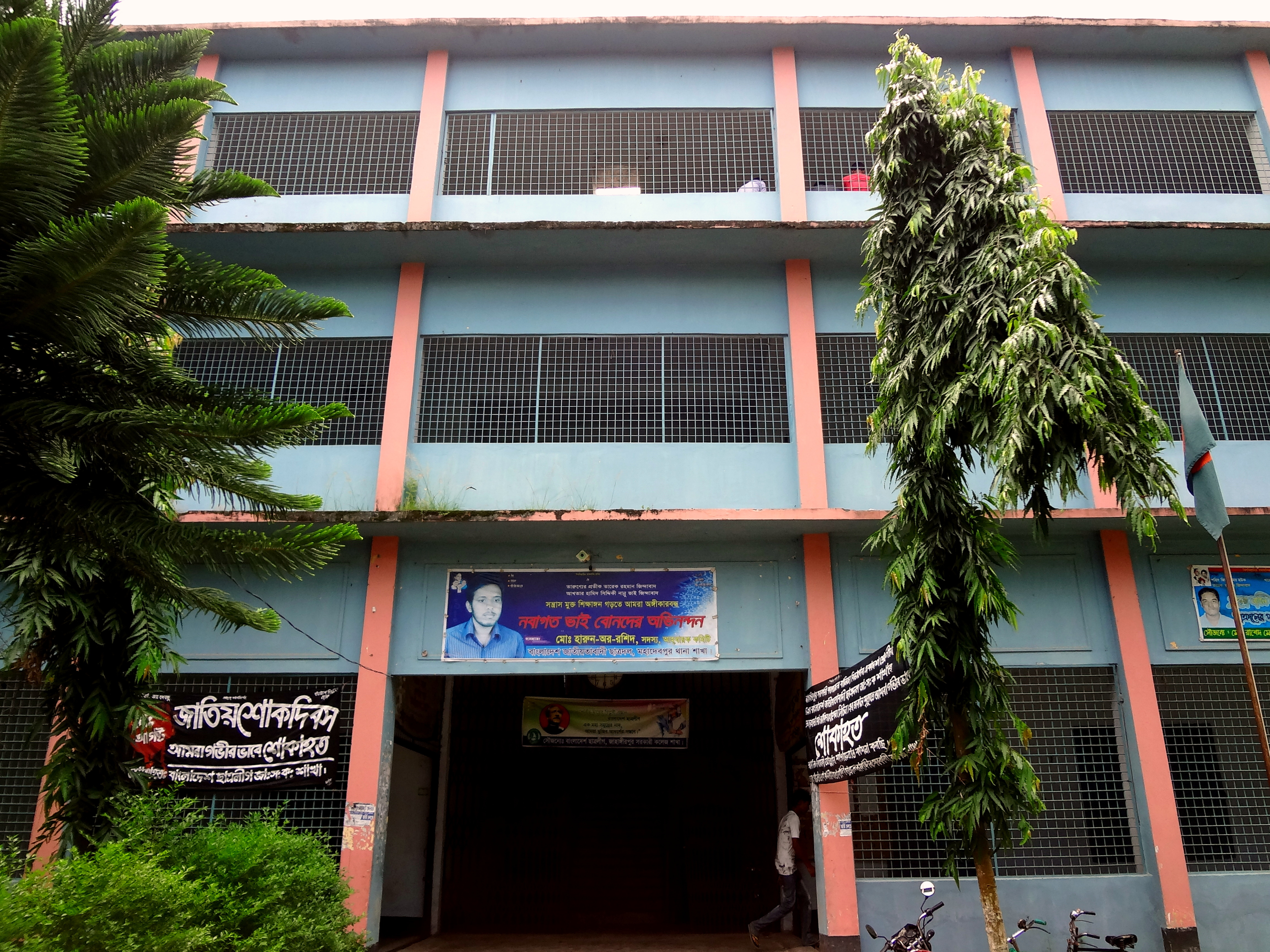
Arts Building, Jahangirpur Govt. College

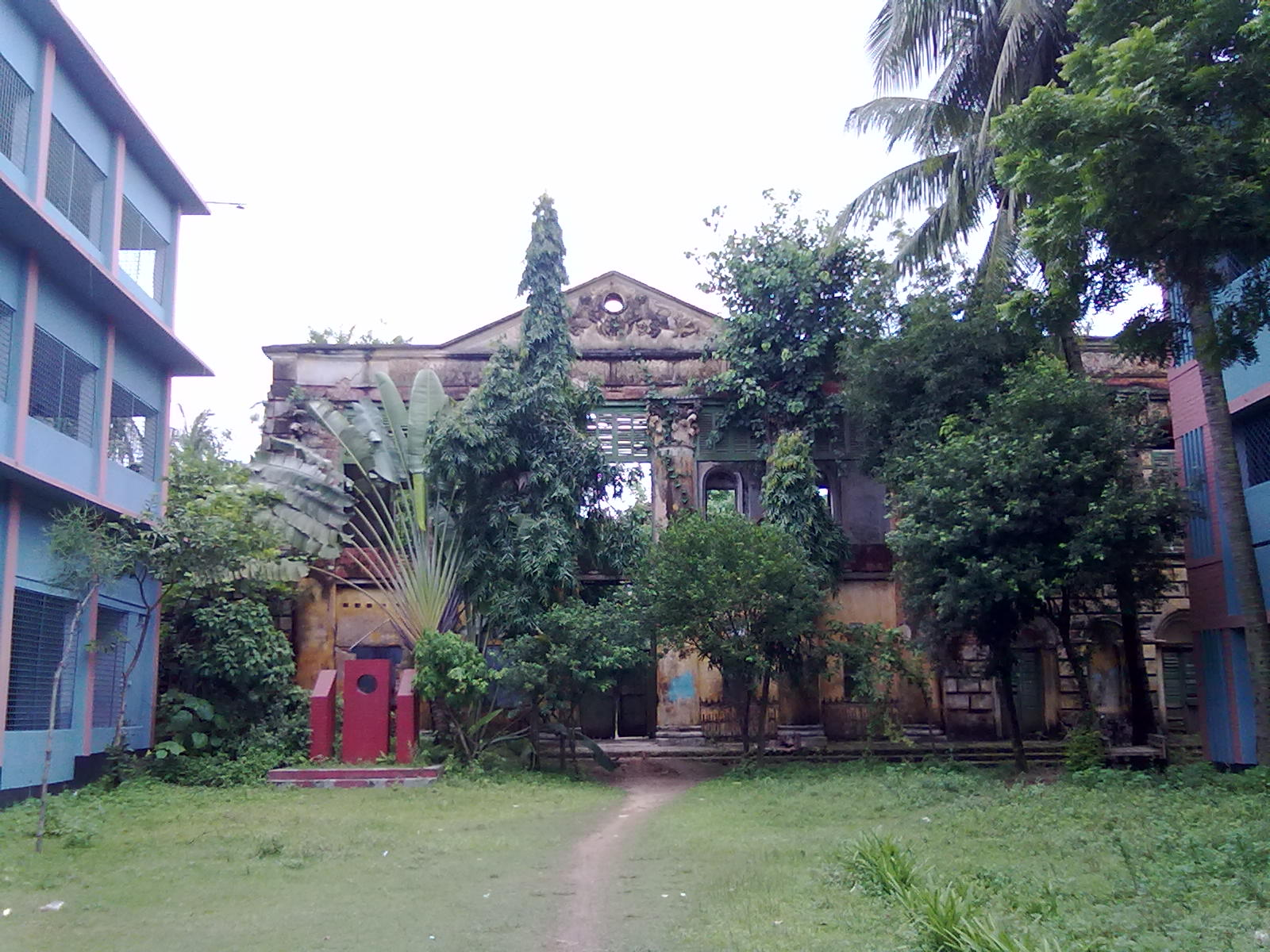
Old Campus Building

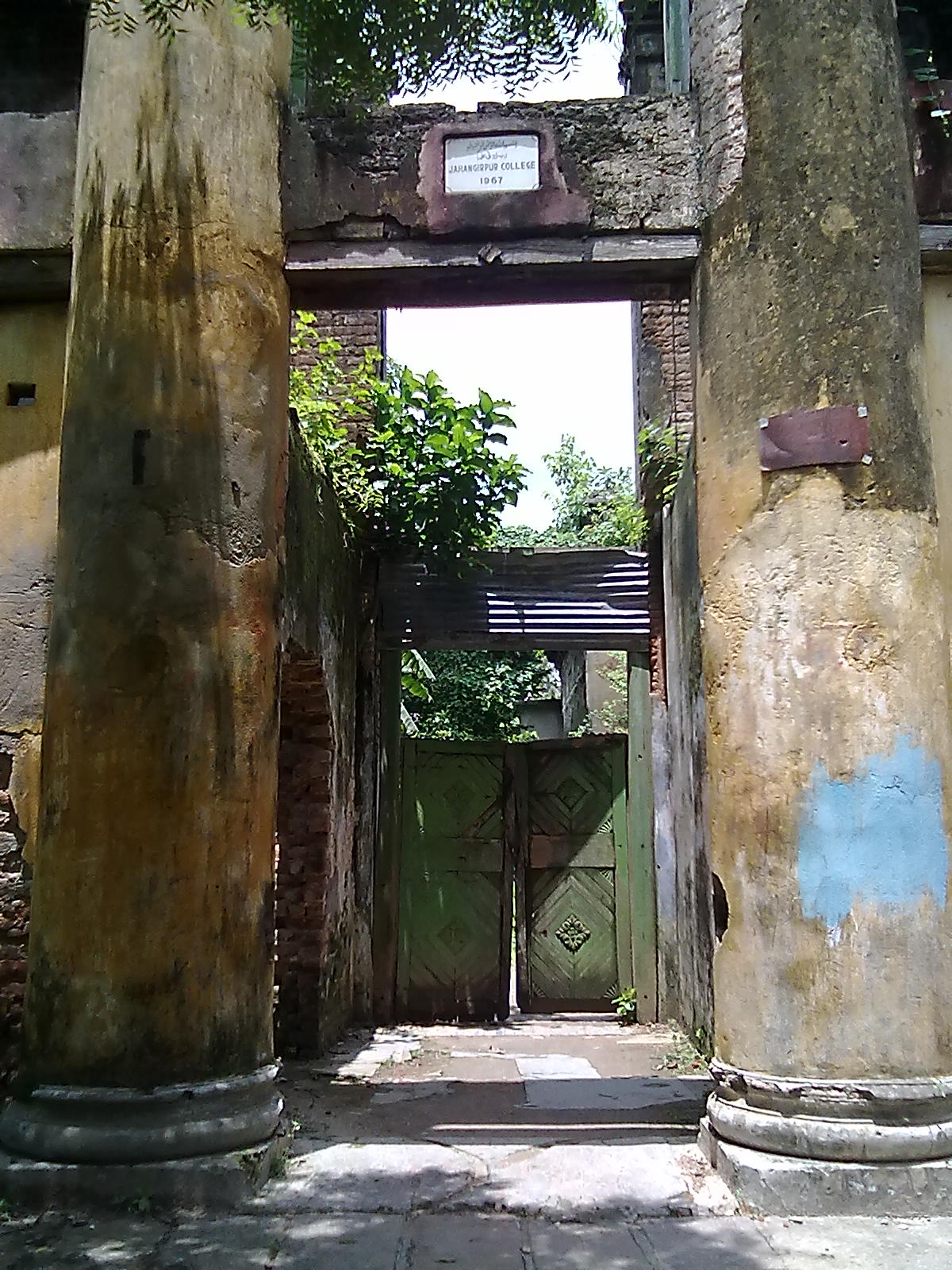
Old Campus Building Entrance

The main administrative building is an example of British Indian colonial architecture. Other important older buildings of the colonial period include the Fuller Hostel Biology Building, Chemistry Building, Physics Building, former Muslim Hostel etc. Newer buildings include the Library and Auditorium, an arts building, both dating from the 1950s and a new science building, dating from the 1990s.

== Academic calendar ==
It is affiliated with the National University.

Academic Calendar
Month	Schedule	Tentative exam schedule	Curriculum
July	11th class start	12th admission/Degree in course exam	
August			
September		Degree in course exam (additional syllabus)	
October		Degree selective exam 1st/2nd/3rd (3rd week)	
November		12th selective exam (last week)	
December		11th mid year exam (1st week)	
January		Degree final exam (National University)	Full syllabus
February		Annual sports & cultural competition	
March	Degree admission start		
April	Degree class start	HSC exam (board)	Full syllabus
May		11th year change exam	
June	11th admission start		
