= Gomostapur Upazila =

Gomostapur গোমস্তাপুর
- Upazila
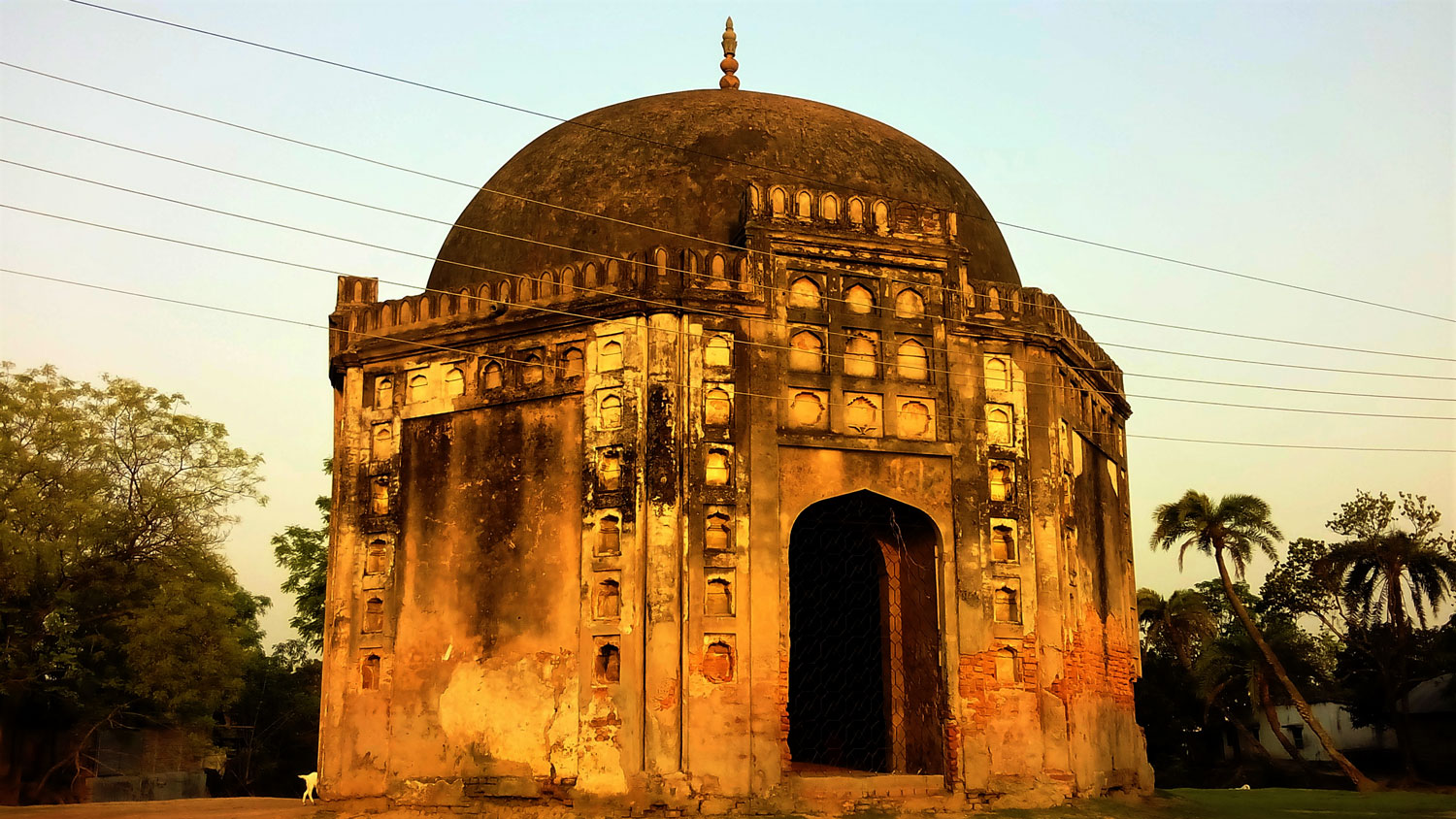
- Rohanpur Octagonal Tomb

- Coordinates: 24°46.5′N 88°17′E
- Country: Bangladesh
- Division: Rajshahi
- District: Chapai Nawabganj
- Headquarters: Rohanpur

Area
  - Total: 318.13 km^{2} (122.83 sq mi)

Population (2022)
  - Total: 304,184
  - Density: 956.16/km^{2} (2,476.4/sq mi)
- Time zone: UTC+6 (BST)
- Postal code: 6320
- Website: gomostapur.chapainawabganj.gov.bd

Gomostapur Upazila mauza geocode map

Gomastapur (Bengali: গোমস্তাপুর) is an upazila of Nawabganj District in Rajshahi Division, Bangladesh. Unlike most districts and upazilas of Bangladesh, Its headquarter is Rohanpur, a municipal town.

== Geography ==
Gomastapur is located at 24.7750°N 88.2833°E. It has 62,938 households and a total area of 318.13 km^{2} (122.83 sq mi).

Gomastapur Upazila is bounded by Habibpur CD block in Malda district, West Bengal, India and Porsha Upazila, in Naogaon District, on the north, Niamatpur Upazila in Naogaon district and Nachol Upazila on the east, Nachol Upazila and Shibganj Upazila, Chapai Nawabganj on the south, and Bholahat Upazila, Shibganj Upazila and Habibpur CD block on the west.

== Demographics ==
Religions in Gomastapur Upazila (2022)
Religion	Percent
Islam	93.39%
Hinduism	5.61%
Christianity	0.76%
Other or not stated	0.24%

According to the 2022 Bangladeshi census, Gomastapur Upazila had 76,403 households and a population of 304,184. 9.79% of the population were under 5 years of age. Gomastapur had a literacy rate (age 7 and over) of 70.47%: 69.76% for males and 71.14% for females, and a sex ratio of 96.22 males for every 100 females. 71,320 (23.45%) lived in urban areas. Ethnic population was 10,825 (3.56%), of which Oraon are 5772 and Santal 1342.

Population of upazila by ethnicity (2022)
1. Bengali (96.4%)
2. Oraon (1.90%)
3. Others (1.66%)

According to the 2011 Census of Bangladesh, Gomastapur Upazila had 62,938 households and a population of 275,823. 61,733 (22.38%) were under 10 years of age. Gomastapur had a literacy rate (age 7 and over) of 41.22%, compared to the national average of 51.8%, and a sex ratio of 1023 females per 1000 males. 58,624 (21.25%) lived in urban areas. Ethnic population was 4,219 (1.53%), of which Santal were 1,537.

As of the 1991 Bangladesh census, Gomastapur has a population of 191,972. Males constitute 50.66% of the population, and females 49.34%. This Upazila's eighteen up population is 96,032. Gomastapur has an average literacy rate of 32.9%, and the national average of 32.4% literate.

== Administration ==
Gomastapur Upazila is divided into Rohanpur Municipality and eight union parishads: Alinogor, Bangabari, Boalia, Chowdala, Gomastapur, Parbotipur, Radhanogor, and Rohanpur. The union parishads are subdivided into 166 mauzas and 234 villages.

Rohanpur Municipality is subdivided into 9 wards and 33 mahallas.

== Education ==
The major educational institutes in Gomastapur are:

- Alinagar School & College
- Bijoy Sunjura Adarsa Jr. School
- Bosnail Junior Girls School
- Bosonitala Girls High School
- Prabatipur Ideal Junior Girls School
- Puratun Prosad Pur Adorso Girls Junior School
- Rohanpur Hazi Gaziuddin Jr. Girls School
- Shoro Gram Junior Girls School
- Alinagar Girls High School
- Baradadapur K.A.M.. High School
- Basanitola High School
- Begunbari B.I.B Girls High School
- Bhat Khair High School
- Boalia Girls High School
- Boalia B.L High School
- Bohipara High School
- Bongpur High School
- Brozonathpur School
- Charadanga High Boys Academy
- Cheradanga Girls High School
- Chowdala Bl. High School
- Chowdala Girls High School
- Deopura High School
- Enayetpur High School
- Gomostapur A. Hamid Girls H.S.
- Gomostapur Girls Academy
- Gomostapur Pilot High School
- Hogla High School
- Huzrapur Model Academy
- Joshoil High School
- Khayrabad Hazi Sadar Ali High School
- Krishnapur High School
- Lebudanga High School
- Mridhapara High School
- Nayadiary Hazi Yakub Ali Mondal High School
- Prosadpur Girls High School
- Radanagar Girls High School
- Radhanagar A.N.C High School
- Rahanpur Janata High School
- Rohanpur Haji Riaz Uddin Sarker High School
- Rohanpur A.B.Gov. High School
- Rohanpur Rabeya Girls High School
- Rokunpur High School
- Sonabar High School
- Sontoshpur Girls High School
- Alinagar Darul Ulum Dakhil Madrasha
- Bangabari Dakhil Madrasha
- Begum Nagor Mohila Dakhil Madrasha
- Bibison Dakhil Madrasah
- Boalia Boirtola Dakhil Madrasah
- Brojnathpur Dakhil Madrasah
- Chhoto Dadpur Dakhil Madrasah
- Chowdala Dakhil Madrasa
- Enayetpur Islamia Dakhil Madrasha
- Gopinathpur D.S. Dakhil Madrasah
- Islampur Gonj Dakhil Madrasah
- Jogibari Dakhil Madrasha
- Kayempur Al Haj Nurjahan Madrasha
- Nandal Al Pur Darus Sunnat Dakhil Madrasa
- Nimtala Kathal Dawatul Islam Dakhil Madrasah
- Norosia Lal Gar Dakhil Madrasha
- Ozogora Baitul Hikma Mohila Dakhil Madrasha
- Pirpur Dakhil Madrasah
- Rohanpur Dakhil Madrasah
- Saheb Gram D.U.J.B.Mohila Dakhil Madrasa
- Gomostapur Dblugram Alim Madrasha
- Kashia Bari Alim Madrasah
- Kharkadanga Alim Madrasa
- Shampur Darussunnah Alim Madrasha
- Prosadpur Fazil Degree Madrasah
- Chowdala Johur Ahmed Mian College
- Parbotipur S. B.(Sonabar) Adarsha College
- Radha Nagar Barendra College
- Rohanpur P. M. Ideal College
- Gomostapur Soleman Mia Degree College
- Rohanpur Yusuf Ali College
- Rohonpur Mohila College
- Banga Bari Yunus Smarani School & College
- Gomostapur Technical and Business Management College
- Rahanpur Technical and Business Management Institute
- Rohonpur Punorbhoba Technical & B M College

== Notable people ==
- N. A. Hamidur Rahman, politician, lawyer and teacher

== See also ==
- Upazilas of Bangladesh
- Districts of Bangladesh
- Divisions of Bangladesh
- Administrative geography of Bangladesh
