= Bangabari Union =

Region in Bangladesh

Bangabari বাঙ্গাবাড়ী ইউনিয়ন
- Union
- Bangabari Union in Bangladesh
- Coordinates: 24.858°N 88.285°E
- Country: Bangladesh
- Division: Rajshahi
- District: Chapai Nawabganj
- Upazila: Gomostapur

Government
  - Chairman: Md. Shahidul Islam

Area
  - Total: 14.70 km^{2} (5.68 sq mi)

Population (2011)
  - Total: 30,288
  - Density: 2,060/km^{2} (5,336/sq mi)
- Time zone: UTC+6 (Bangladesh Standard Time)
- Post Code: 6320
- Website: Bangabari Tothyo Batayon

Bangabari Union (Bengali: বাঙ্গাবাড়ী ইউনিয়ন) is one of the nine union parishod of Gomostapur Upazila in Bangladesh. It has an area of 14.70 km^{2} and a population at the 2011 Census of 30,288 (preliminary figures). Bangabari Union consists of 19 villages. It has an excellent road communication infrastructure. The union porishod office of Bangabari Union is only three-four hours road journey away from Rajshahi Division, the divisional city.

== Geography ==
The famous Mohannad river borders Bangabari Union on the south and in the West. Bangabari Union shares a border with India.

== Infrastructure ==
=== Communications ===
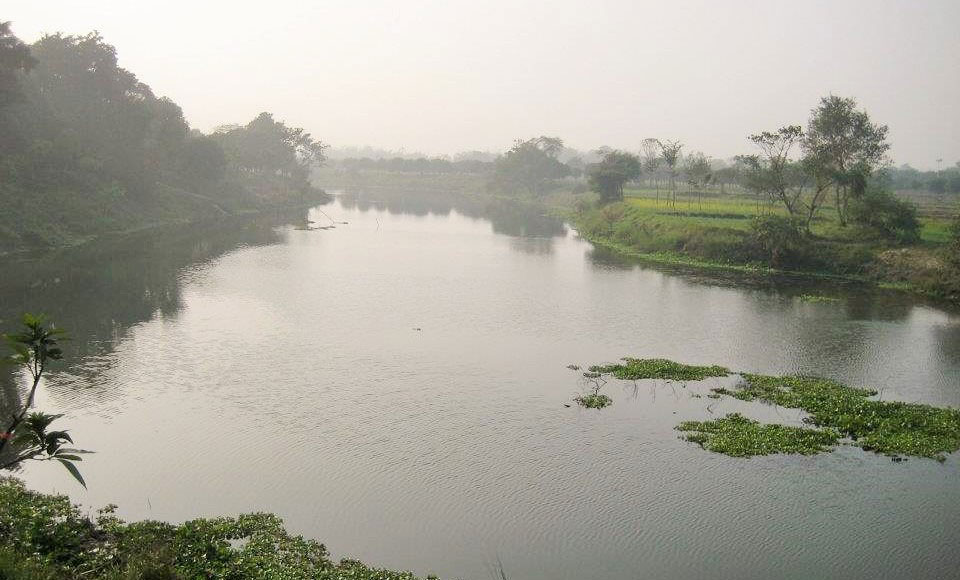
Tangon River at Bangabari-India border

Bangabari Union is served by major cellular networks. Phones are available for making calls. Internet services are available, though the data bandwidth is poor.

=== Health facilities ===
There is a small public health facility in the village with a doctor and first aid support.

== Education ==
Bangabari Union has a low literacy rate, estimated at 49% in 2013. There are a number of educational facilities around Bangabari, these include

- Government Primary School: 14
- High School: 5
- Higher Secondary (College): 1
- Technical School: 1
- Religious School: 3

== Languages ==
The local people speaks Bangla. Bangla and English languages are taught in the schools and the educated part of the population can understand and speak in English.

== See also ==
- Gomostapur Upazila
- List of villages in Bangladesh
- Nawabganj District
