= Azizur Rahman Miah =

Bangladeshi politician

Md. Azizur Rahman Miah

Member of Bangladesh Parliament
- In office 1991–1996
- Succeeded by: Salek Chowdhury

Personal details
- Party: Bangladesh Awami League

Md. Azizur Rahman Miah (Bengali: আজিজুর রহমান মিয়া) is a Bangladesh Awami League politician and a former member of parliament for Naogaon-1.

== Career ==
Miah was elected to parliament from Naogaon-1 as a Bangladesh Awami League candidate in 1991.
