= Nachol Upazila =

Nachole নাচোল
- Upazila
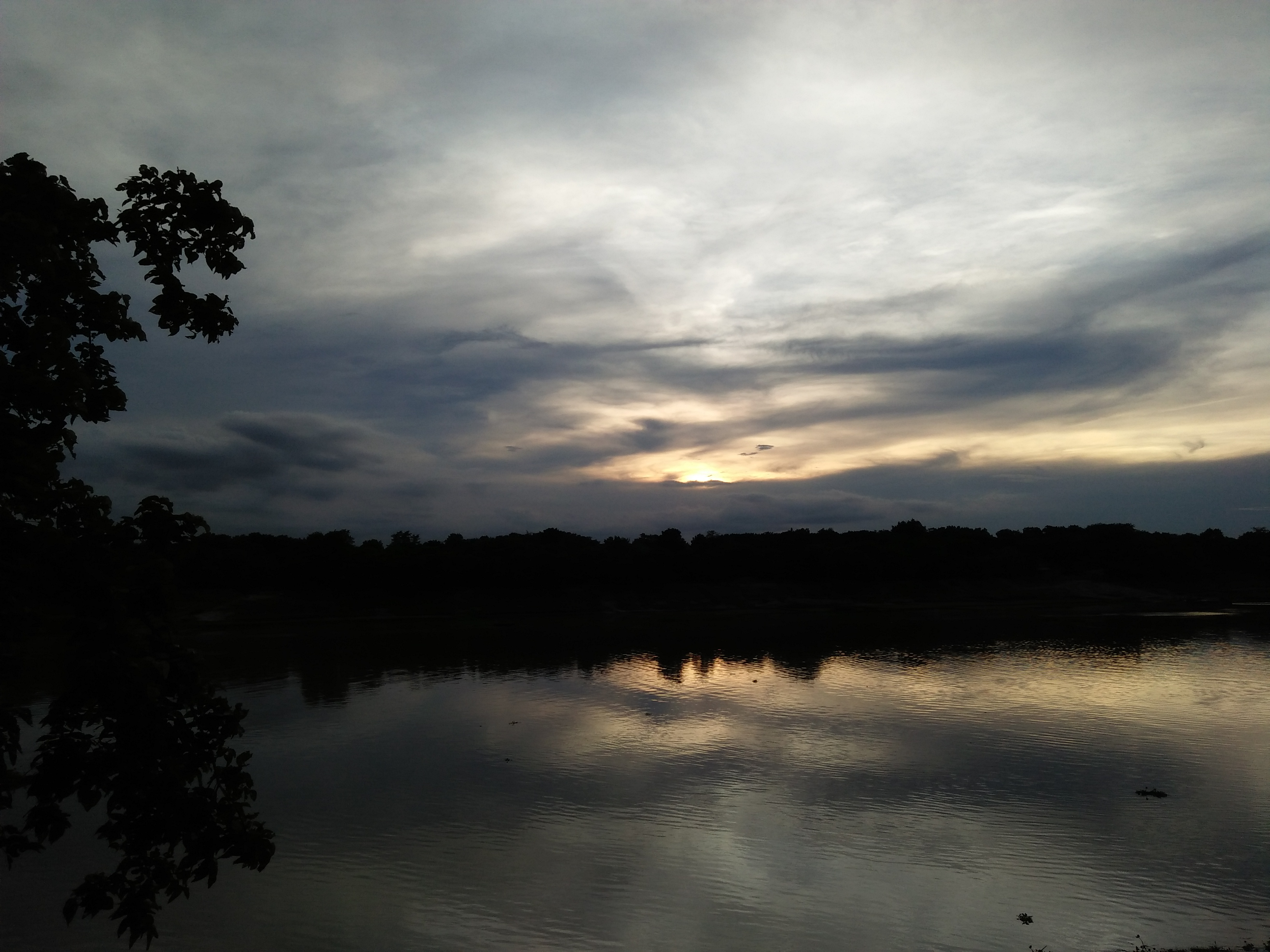
- Pond in Chandpara

- Coordinates: 24°43.8′N 88°25.2′E
- Country: Bangladesh
- Division: Rajshahi
- District: Chapai Nawabganj

Area
  - Total: 283.67 km^{2} (109.53 sq mi)

Population (2022)
  - Total: 167,678
  - Density: 591.10/km^{2} (1,530.9/sq mi)
- Time zone: UTC+6 (BST)
- Postal code: 6310
- Website: nachol.chapainawabganj.gov.bd

Nachole (Bengali: নাচোল) is an upazila of Chapai Nawabganj District in the Division of Rajshahi, Bangladesh.

== Geography ==
Nachole is located at 24.7292°N 88.4194°E. It has a total area of 283.67 km^{2}.

Nachole Upazila is bounded by Gomostapur Upazila on the north-west, Niamatpur Upazila in Naogaon District, on the north-east, Tanore Upazila in Rajshahi District on the south-east and Chapai Nawabganj Sadar Upazila on the south west.

== Demographics ==
Religions in Nachole Upazila (2022)
Religion	Percent
Islam	89.61%
Hinduism	7.83%
Christianity	2.03%
Other (tribal religion)	0.53%

According to the 2022 Bangladeshi census, Nachole Upazila had 42,679 households and a population of 167,678. 9.94% of the population were under 5 years of age. Nachole had a literacy rate (age 7 and over) of 73.58%: 73.47% for males and 73.68% for females, and a sex ratio of 95.71 males for every 100 females. 28,850 (17.21%) lived in urban areas.

According to the 2011 Census of Bangladesh, Nachole Upazila had 32,922 households and a population of 146,627. 32,453 (22.13%) were under 10 years of age. Nachole had a literacy rate (age 7 and over) of 45.47%, compared to the national average of 51.8%, and a sex ratio of 1011 females per 1000 males. 17,364 (11.84%) lived in urban areas. According to the 2022 census, total population was 167,678. Ethnic population was 10,026(5.98%) in which Santal people was 3,234, Barman was 6,447, Kudmi Mahato was 873, Oraon people was 730,Munda people was 622 and Mahali people was 577.

Population of upazila by ethnicity (2022)
1. Bengali (94.0%)
2. Santal (1.93%)
3. Barman (1.54%)
4. Others (2.51%)

== Administration ==
Nachol Upazila is divided into Nachol Municipality and four union parishads: Fatehpur, Kosba, Nachol, and Nezampur. The union parishads are subdivided into 201 mauzas and 191 villages.

Unions of Nachole:

Name of Union	Area (acre)	Male Population	Female Population
Kosba	15183	16463	16686
Fatehpur	18279	16715	16465
Nachole	15186	17300	17637
Nijampur	18489	13836	14161

Nachol Municipality is subdivided into 9 wards and 10 mahallas.

The first elected mayor of the municipality was Abdul Malek Chowdhury (2010–2015). At present, the mayor is Abdur Rashid Khan Jhalu.

== Education ==
Nachole Upazila has 7 college (including 1 government college), 3 technical colleges, 34 secondary schools (including 1 government school), 77 primary schools and 18 madrasas.

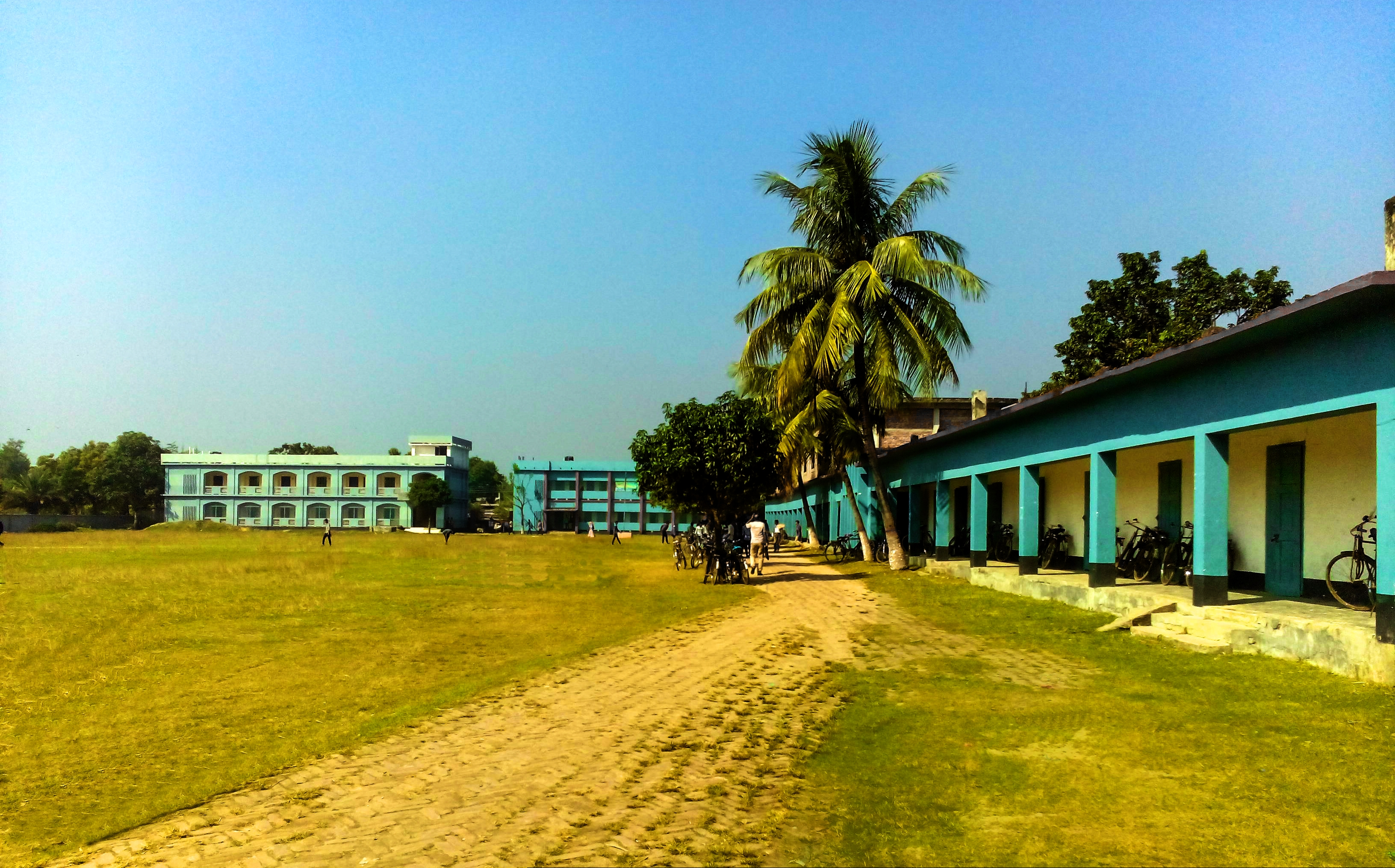
Nachole Government College

== See also ==
- Upazilas of Bangladesh
- Districts of Bangladesh
- Divisions of Bangladesh
- Dogachi
