= Dogachi =

Village in Bangladesh

Coordinates: 24.6722°N 88.4500°E

Dogachhi (Bengali: দোগাছী) is a village in Nezampur Union Parishad of Nachol Upazila in Chapai Nawabganj District, Bangladesh.

According to the 2011 Bangladesh census, Dogachhi had 426 households and a population of 2,041. 10.5% of the population was under the age of 5. The literacy rate (age 7 and over) was 41.8%.
