= Porsha Upazila =

Porsha Upazila পোরশা উপজেলা
- Upazila of Bangladesh
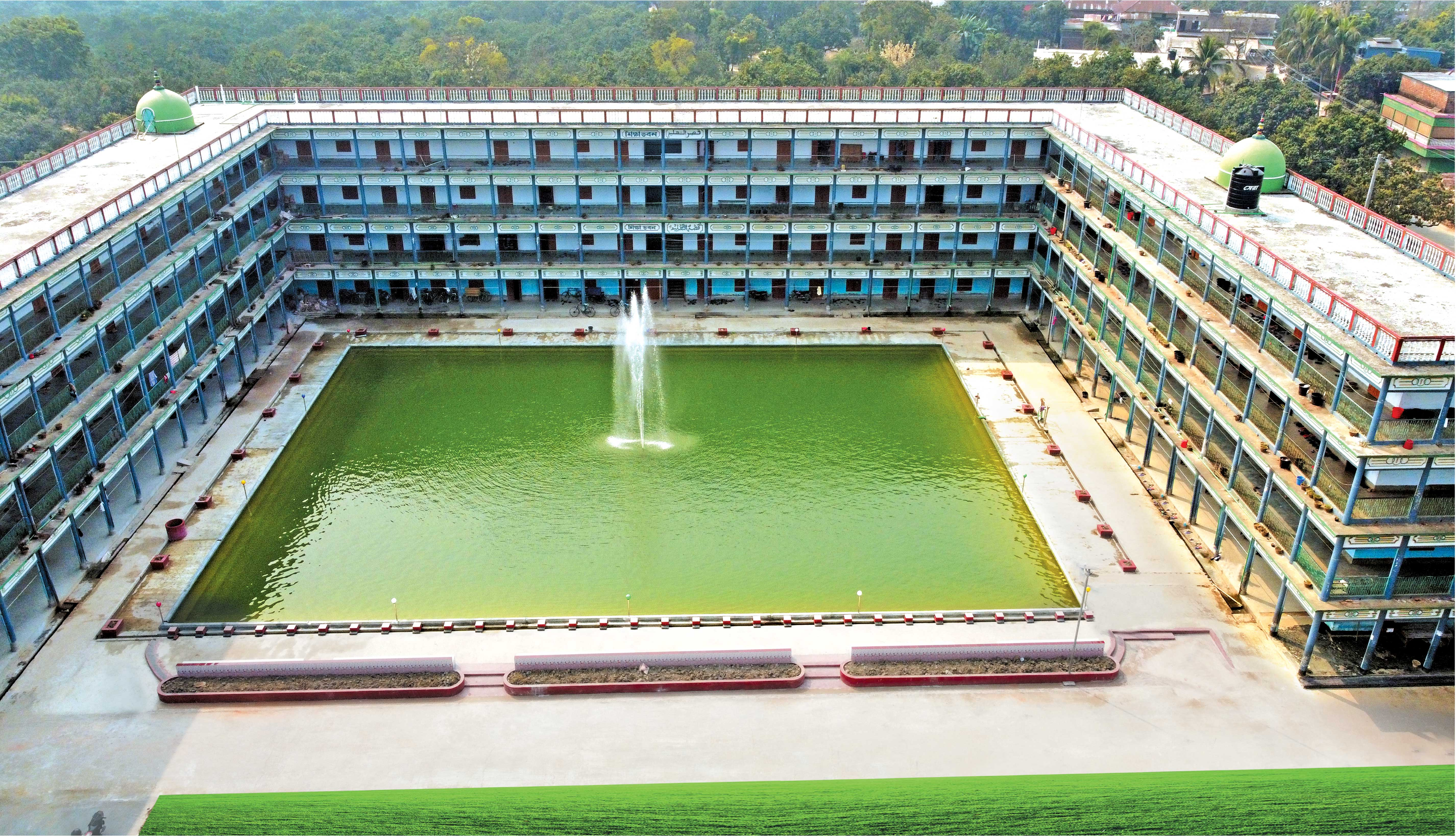
- Darul Hidayah Madrasa in Porsha

- Coordinates: 25°1.5′N 88°29′E
- Country: Bangladesh
- Division: Rajshahi
- District: Naogaon

Area
  - Total: 252.83 km^{2} (97.62 sq mi)

Population (2022)
  - Total: 147,021
  - Density: 581.50/km^{2} (1,506.1/sq mi)
- Time zone: UTC+6 (BST)
- Postal code: 6550
- Website: Porsha

Porsha Upazila mauza geocode map

Porsha Upazila (Bengali: পোরশা উপজেলা) is an upazila of Naogaon District in the division of Rajshahi, Bangladesh.

== Geography ==
Naogaon District

Porsha is located at 25.0250°N 88.4833°E, and borders West Bengal, India. It has a total area 252.83 km^{2.} One of the principal towns, Nithpur, lies on the Indian border.

Porsha Upazila is bounded by Sapahar Upazila on the north, Patnitala and Mohadevpur Upazilas on the east, Gomostapur and Niamatpur Upazilas on the south, Habibpur and Barmangola CD Blocks in Malda district, West Bengal, India, on the west.

== Climate ==
Porsha's climate differs from Rajshahi due to its lack of precipitation to be classified as a tropical wet and dry climate. Instead, under the Köppen climate classification, it is classified as a humid subtropical climate (Cwa). This is because its temperature is colder than 18°C on average in the coldest month but warmer than 22°C on average in the warmest month. Porsha's climate is similar to neighbouring districts in North Bengal and is similar to the rest of the Eastern Gangetic Plains.

Climate data for Porsha
Month	Jan	Feb	Mar	Apr	May	Jun	Jul	Aug	Sep	Oct	Nov	Dec	Year
Mean daily maximum °C (°F)	23.2 (73.8)	26.8 (80.2)	31.7 (89.1)	34.1 (93.4)	33.3 (91.9)	32.3 (90.1)	31.4 (88.5)	31.5 (88.7)	31.0 (87.8)	30.0 (86.0)	27.9 (82.2)	24.6 (76.3)	29.8 (85.6)
Daily mean °C (°F)	17.4 (63.3)	20.7 (69.3)	25.3 (77.5)	28.1 (82.6)	28.5 (83.3)	28.6 (83.5)	28.1 (82.6)	28.1 (82.6)	27.6 (81.7)	25.9 (78.6)	22.4 (72.3)	18.9 (66.0)	25.0 (77.0)
Mean daily minimum °C (°F)	11.5 (52.7)	14.3 (57.7)	18.6 (65.5)	22.5 (72.5)	24.2 (75.6)	25.7 (78.3)	25.8 (78.4)	25.7 (78.3)	24.9 (76.8)	22.2 (72.0)	17.4 (63.3)	13.4 (56.1)	20.5 (68.9)
Source: Climate Data for Cities Worldwide

== Demographics ==
Religions in Porsha Upazila (2022)
Religion	Percent
Islam	86.87%
Hinduism	11.08%
Christianity	1.35%
Other or not stated	0.70%

According to the 2022 Bangladeshi census, Porsha Upazila had 37,047 households and a population of 147,021. 9.31% of the population were under 5 years of age. Porsha had a literacy rate (age 7 and over) of 74.00%: 75.01% for males and 72.98% for females, and a sex ratio of 102.74 males for every 100 females. 18,441 (12.54%) lived in urban areas. Ethnic population is 10,878 (7.40%), of which Oraon are 5,471 and Santal 2400 and Munda 1,148.

Population of upazila by ethnicity (2022)
1. Bengali (92.6%)
2. Oraon (3.72%)
3. Santal (1.63%)
4. Others (2.05%)

According to the 2011 Census of Bangladesh, Porsha Upazila had 30,773 households and a population of 132,095. 28,143 (21.31%) were under 10 years of age. Porsha had a literacy rate (age 7 and over) of 42.52%, compared to the national average of 51.8%, and a sex ratio of 992 females per 1000 males. 12,418 (9.40%) lived in urban areas. Ethnic population was 14,374 (10.88%), of which Oraon were 6,060, Santal 2,934 and Barman 1,945.

As of the 1991 Bangladesh census, Porsha had a population of 97279. Males constituted 50.18% of the population, and females 49.82%. This Upazila's eighteen up population is 48932. Porsha had an average literacy rate of 26.5% (7+ years), and the national average of 32.4% literate.

== Administration ==
Porsha Thana was formed in 1933 and it was turned into an upazila in 1984.

Porsha Upazila is divided into six union parishads: Chhaor, Ganguria, Ghatnagar, Masidpur, Nithpur, and Tentulia. The union parishads are subdivided into 155 mauzas and 246 villages.

== Notable landmarks ==
- Darul Hidayah Madrasa
- Nithpur Bazar Jame Mosque
- Nitpur Kopalir Mor
- Porscha Government Degree College
- Life Care Digital Diagnostic Center
- Upazila Health Complex
- Upazila Model Mosjid
- Nithpur Purbo Diyarapara Jame Mosjid
- Nithpur Diyarapara Model GOVT Primary School

== See also ==
- Upazilas of Bangladesh
- Districts of Bangladesh
- Divisions of Bangladesh
