= Salek Chowdhury =

Bangladeshi politician

Member of Bangladesh Parliament

Personal details
- Party: Bangladesh Nationalist Party

Salek Chowdhury is a Bangladesh Nationalist Party politician and a former member of parliament for Naogaon-1.

== Career ==
Chowdhury was elected to parliament from Naogaon-1 as a Bangladesh Nationalist Party candidate in 1996 and 2001.
