= Niamatpur Upazila =

Niamatpur Upazila নিয়ামতপুর উপজেলা
- Upazila of Bangladesh
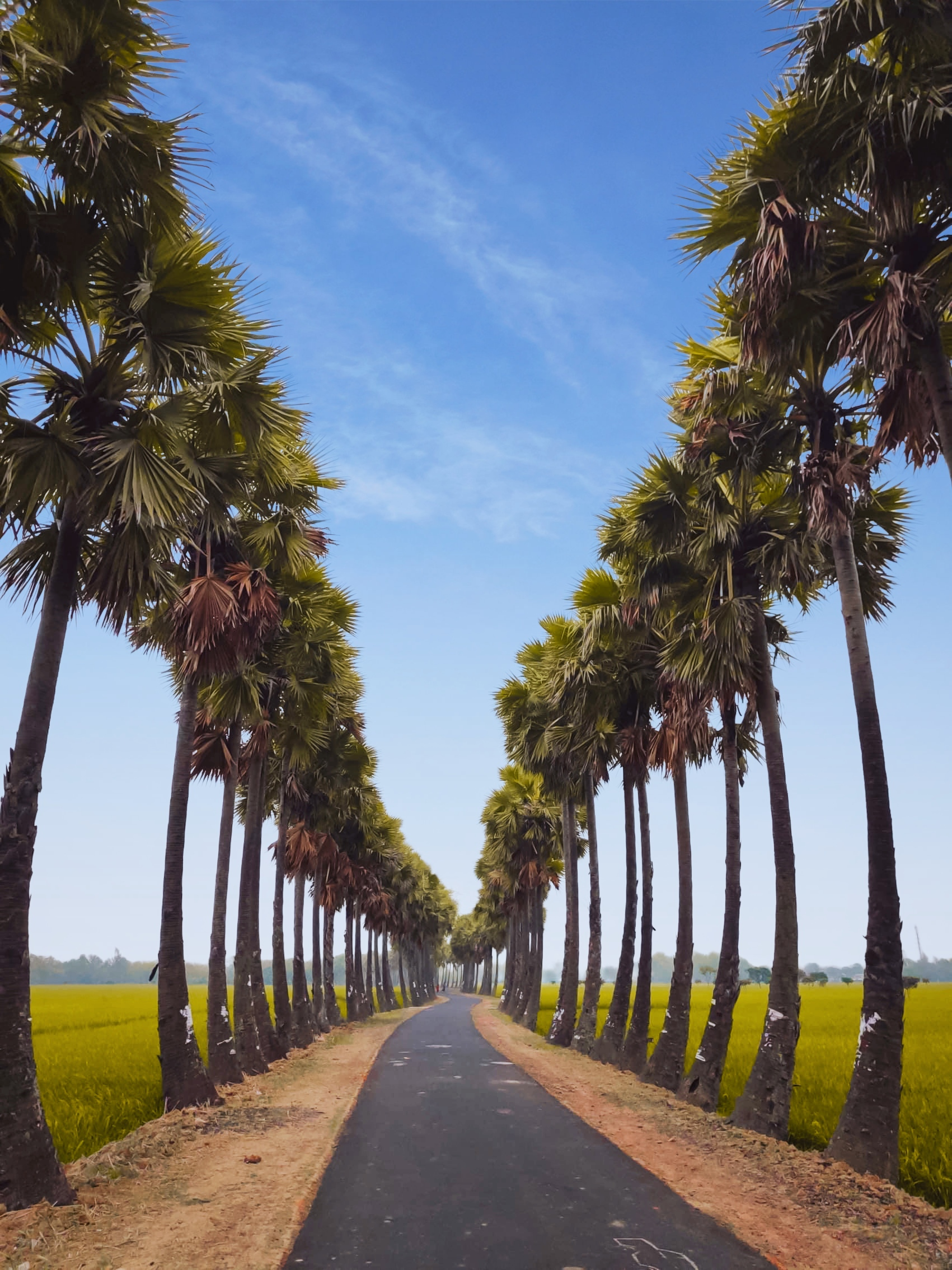
- Ghughudanga, Niamatpur upazila

- Coordinates: 24°51.5′N 88°34′E
- Country: Bangladesh
- Division: Rajshahi
- District: Naogaon

Area
  - Total: 449.09 km^{2} (173.39 sq mi)

Population (2022)
  - Total: 270,452
  - Density: 602.22/km^{2} (1,559.7/sq mi)
- Time zone: UTC+6 (BST)
- Postal code: 6520
- Website: Official Map of Niamatpur

Niamatpur Upazila mauza geocode map

Niamatpur Upazila (Bengali: নিয়ামতপুর উপজেলা) is an upazila of Naogaon District in the Division of Rajshahi, Bangladesh.

== Geography ==
Map of Naogaon District

Niamatpur is located at 24.8583°N 88.5667°E. It has 35,299 households and a total area of 449.09 km^{2}. It is bounded by Porsha Upazila on the north, Tanore and Nachole upazilas on the south, Manda and Mahadevpur upazilas on the east, Gomastapur and Nachole upazilas on the west.

== Demographics ==
Religions in Niamatpur Upazila (2022)
| Religion | Percent |
| Islam | 78.24% |
| Hinduism | 18.56% |
| Christianity | 1.78% |
| Other or not stated | 1.41% |

According to the 2022 Bangladeshi census, Niamatpur Upazila had 73,523 households and a population of 270,452. 8.11% of the population were under 5 years of age. Niamatpur had a literacy rate (age 7 and over) of 72.63%: 74.81% for males and 70.49% for females, and a sex ratio of 98.68 males for every 100 females. 19,792 (7.32%) lived in urban areas.

According to the 2011 Census of Bangladesh, Niamatpur Upazila had 61,811 households and a population of 248,351. 49,712 inhabitants (20.02%) were under 10 years of age. Niamatpur had a literacy rate (age 7 and over) of 44.71%, compared to the national average of 51.8%, and a sex ratio of 1,026 females per 1,000 males. 5,953 (2.40%) lived in urban areas.

According to the 2022 census, total population was 270,452. Ethnic population was 29,710 (10.98%) in which Santal people was 6,029, Munda people was 7,965, Oraon people was 6,955 and Barman was 3,528.

Population of upazila by ethnicity (2022)
1. Bengali (89.0%)
2. Munda (2.94%)
3. Oraon (2.57%)
4. Santal (2.23%)
5. Barman (1.30%)
6. Others (1.94%)

Twenty years earlier, the number of female inhabitants was lower, and males constituted a slender majority. As of the 1991 Bangladesh census, Niamatpur had a population of 193,197. Males constituted 50.37% of the population, and females 49.63%. This Upazila's eighteen up population was 98,284. Niamatpur had an average literacy rate of 25.8% (7+ years), and the national average of 32.4% literate.

== Administration ==
Niamatpur Thana was formed in 1918 and it was turned into an upazila in 1983.

Niamatpur Upazila is divided into eight union parishads: Bahadurpur, Bhabicha, Chandan Nagar, Hajinagar, Niamatpur, Parail, Rasulpur, and Sreemantapur. The union parishads are subdivided into 317 mauzas and 344 villages.

== See also ==
- Upazilas of Bangladesh
- Districts of Bangladesh
- Divisions of Bangladesh
