= Sonar (disambiguation) =

Sonar or SONAR is a technique that uses sound propagation under water.

Sonar or SONAR may also refer to:

== Companies ==
- Sonar (company), a Swiss company
- Sonar Entertainment, a television production company
- Sonar Kollektiv, a German record label
- Sonar Music, at Fox Studios Australia
- Sonar Radio, an online radio station based in Singapore
- Sonar Records, an English record label

== Entertainment ==
- Sonar (band), a Belgian musical group
- Sonar (comics), a DC Comics fictional character
- Sonar (Transformers), a fictional character
- Sónar, a music festival in Barcelona, Spain
- "Sonar", a radio single of the Mexican Electro/Pop band Belanova
- Sonar Kella, a 1974 Indian novel and film
- Vivek Sonar (born 1976), Indian flautist

== Computing ==
- Sonar (mobile application)
- SONAR (Symantec), a technology used in Norton-security software
- SonarQube, formerly named Sonar, a software quality management platform
- Cakewalk Sonar, digital audio workstation software
- Mouse Sonar, a computer accessibility feature in Microsoft Windows
- Sonar, the artificial intelligence model of Perplexity

== Other ==
- Sonar (keelboat), a sailboat
- Sonar River, India
- Kafil Uddin Sonar (1940s–2019), Bangladeshi politician
- Animal echolocation or bio sonar, the use of sound to navigate and identify objects

== See also ==
- Sonnar
