= Gurukul Pratishthan =

Institute promoting Indian classical music and art forms

- Type: Music
- Established: 2006
- Chairman: Vivek Sonar
- Location: Mumbai, Maharashtra, India
- Website: www.gurukulpratishthan.org

Gurukul Pratishthan, a charitable trust, is an institute with the ideology of promoting and encouraging the Indian classical music and various other forms of art. It was founded by Shree Vivek Sonar. He is one amongst the senior most deciples of Pandit Hariprasad Chaurasia, a Padma Vibhushan holder and a well-known artist of the instrument Bansuri.

== History ==
The Gurukul Academy was formed in 2006, and is an institute that is dedicated to Bansuri and various other forms of Hindustani classical music. Under the training of Vivek Sonar, the institute is in the process of making various young Bansuri artists. Apart from Bansuri, students are provided with training in Hindustani classical vocal and tabla under the guidance of the respective gurus.

== Characteristic ==
The main objectives of the institute is to preserve and promote the cultural heritage of the Indian classical music and other forms of art like painting, sculpting, etc. through continuous practice and research.

The institute spread awareness amongst the world about the Indian classical music through various activities like making learning of different forms of art accessible to anyone and everyone, creating outreaching programs like workshops, offering scholarships to young learning artists as an encouragement.

The Institute provide proper platform for amateur artists to perform their art. Also felicitate and honor the senior artists for their dedication and contribution towards music.

== Members of Gurukul Pratishthan (Notable Faculty) ==
- Chairman: Vivek Sonar
- Treasurer: Deepak Sonawane
- Advisor: Sandip Malvi
- Secretary: Ghanshyam Sonar
- Member: Kavita Sarode

== Initiatives of Gurukul Pratishthan ==
=== Bansuri Utsav ===
The Bansuri Utsav is an exceptional blend of Indian Classical music program which takes place every year since 2007 in Thane. 35 artists play flute together uniformly in a particular composition. The sixth year of Bansuri Utsav was presented in January 2013.

=== Flute Symphony ===
The Flute Symphony, a concept by Vivek Sonar since 2007, promises to deliver a wonderful experience of music. It includes a hundred piece of orchestra consisting of flute in between surrounded by various other instruments like guitar, drums, keyboard, saxophone and other different differences. Every year it features a different raga based composition and to name a few, it includes ragas like Raga Khamaj, Raga Bhinna Shadja, Raga Yaman, etc.

=== Khandesh Sangeet Samaroh ===
In the Khandesh region of Maharashtra, the Indian classical music has not gained much importance. A music movement called Khandesh Sangeet Samaroh was started by Vivek Sonar in the year 2010 in chalisgaon, his hometown in Maharashtra. The motive of the movement was to recognize and encourage the Indian classical music in small towns. Hence, it was conceivable to bring various performances of the leading musicians to the town of Khandesh.

=== Aadaranjali and Swaranjali ===
In the memory of Late Shree Ramchandra D. Sonar, father of Vivek Sonar, in 2010, Vivek Sonar started an annual music program Aadaranjali which is held in Chalisgaon in May every year. Another yearly music event is held yearly in Chalisgaon in the memory of Master Anant Rao Gurav.
