= Ekramul Bari Tipu =

Bangladeshi politician

- ইকরামুল বারী টিপু

Member of the Bangladesh Parliament for Naogaon-4
- Incumbent
- Assumed office 17 February 2026
- Preceded by: SM Brohani Sultan Mahmud

Personal details
- Born: March 1, 1965 (age 61) Manda Upazila, Naogaon District
- Party: Bangladesh Nationalist Party
- Education: Rajshahi Medical College

Ekramul Bari Tipu is a Bangladeshi politician of the Bangladesh Nationalist Party. He is currently serving as a member of parliament from Naogaon-4.

== Early life ==
Sayed was born on 1 March 1965 in Manda Upazila in Naogaon District.

== Education ==
Tipu completed his MBBS from Rajshahi Medical College under University of Rajshahi. He received postgraduate degree from Dhaka Shishu Hospital.

== Political Life ==
Tipu was elected as Upazila Chairman in 2006. In 2026, he was elected as MP from Naogaon-4.
