= Quazi Tarikul Islam =

Bangladeshi physician and academic

- কাজী তারিকুল ইসলাম
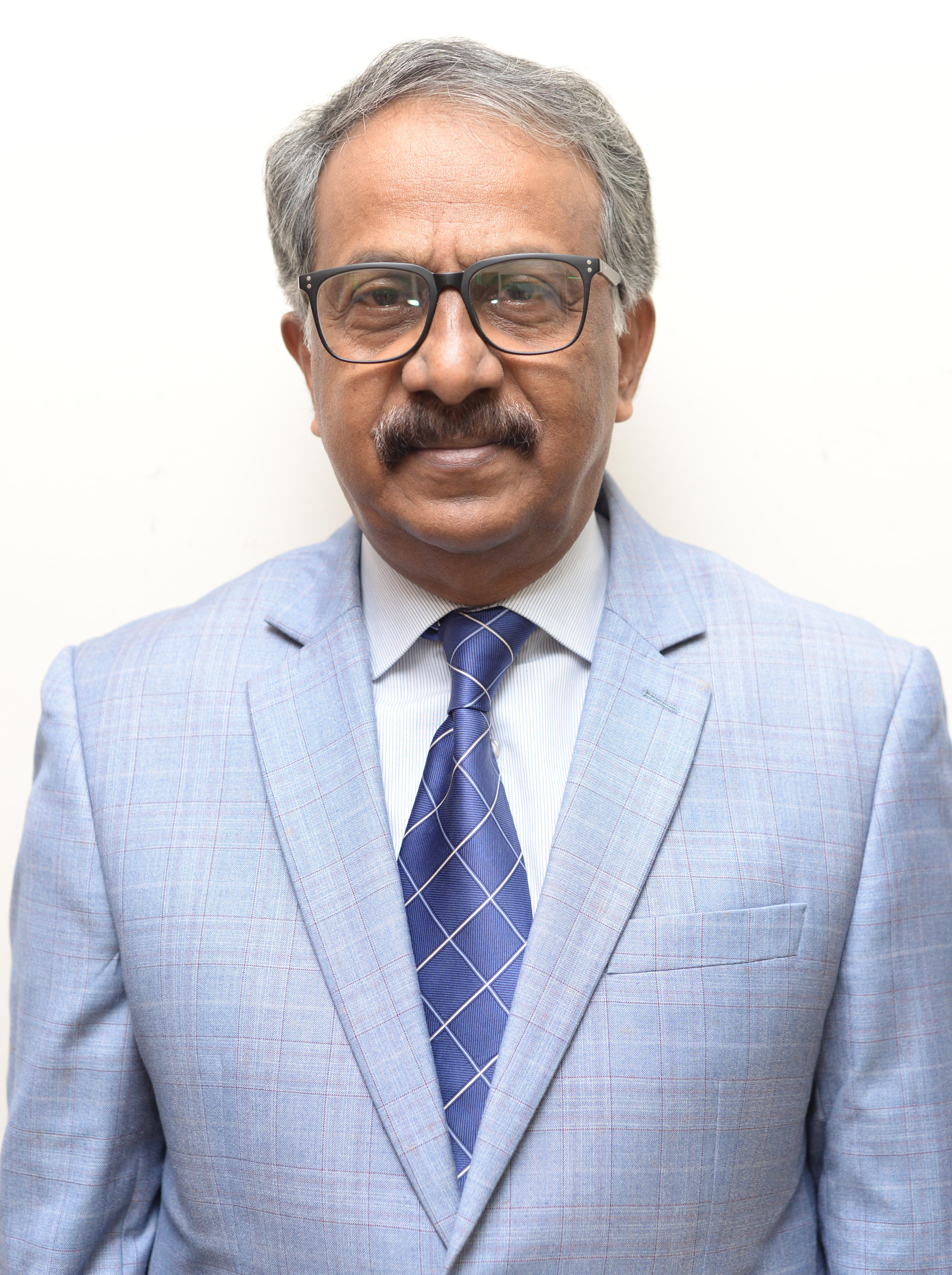
- Quazi Tarikul Islam in 2021
- Born: 1954 (age 71–72); Khulna
- Education: MBBS, FCPS (Medicine), FRCP (Glasgow), FRCP (Edin), FRCP (London), MACP (USA)
- Alma mater: Rajshahi Medical College
- Occupations: Physician, academic
- Employer: Popular Medical College
- Website: quaziislam.com

Quazi Tarikul Islam is a Bangladeshi physician and academic. As of 2017, he is a councilor and controller of examination in the Bangladesh College of Physicians and Surgeons. He has served as a member of the Regional Technical Advisor Group for Dengue, SEARO, WHO. He has at least 123 publications in national and international journals. He was the founder Governor of the Bangladesh chapter of American College of Physicians. He was a Member in the National Technical Advisory Committee for COVID-19.

== Early life and education ==
Islam was born in Khulna. He completed MBBS from Rajshahi Medical College. He completed FCPS (Medicine) from Bangladesh College of Physicians and Surgeons on 1987. He is the Overseas Regional advisor, Royal College of Physicians of Edinburgh, UK (2019-2024). He is also Executive Member of International Society of Internal Medicine (ISIM) (2018-2021)

== Career ==
Islam was the Professor of Medicine both in Rajshahi Medical College (2007-2009) and Dhaka Medical College (2009-2011). He is the Editor in Chief, National guideline for clinical management of Dengue syndrome 2020. He is the Author of "51 cases in Clinical Medicine" published in December 2019. After retirement he joined as a professor of medicine in Popular Medical College where he also works as a Medicine Specialist.
