= Sonor (disambiguation) =

Sonor may refer to:

- Luc Sonor
- Sonor (album)
- Sonorism
- Visi-Sonor

== See also ==
- Sonar (disambiguation)
