= Naogaon-4 =

Constituency of Bangladesh's Jatiya Sangsad

Coordinates: 24.78°N 88.70°E

- Constituency for the Jatiya Sangsad
- District: Naogaon District
- Division: Rajshahi Division
- Electorate: 289,226 (2018)

Current constituency
- Created: 1984
- Party: Bangladesh Nationalist Party
- Member: Ekramul Bari Tipu
- ← 48 Naogaon-3 50 Naogaon-5 →

Naogaon-4 is a constituency represented in the Jatiya Sangsad (National Parliament) of Bangladesh since 2026 by Ekramul Bari Tipu of the Bangladesh Nationalist Party.

== Boundaries ==
The constituency encompasses Manda Upazila.

== History ==
The constituency was created in 1984 from the Rajshahi-7 constituency when the former Rajshahi District was split into four districts: Nawabganj, Naogaon, Rajshahi, and Natore.

== Members of Parliament ==
Election	Member	Party
1986	Emaz Uddin Pramanik	Awami League
1988	Kafil Uddin Sonar	Jatiya Party
1991	Nasir Uddin	Bangladesh Jamaat-e-Islami
Feb 1996	Shamsul Alam Pramanik	Bangladesh Nationalist Party
2001	Shamsul Alam Pramanik	Bangladesh Nationalist Party
2008	Emaz Uddin Pramanik	Awami League
2014	Emaz Uddin Pramanik	Awami League
2024	SM Brohani Sultan Mahmud	Independent
2026	Ekramul Bari Tipu	Bangladesh Nationalist Party

== Elections ==
=== Elections in the 2010s ===
General Election 2014: Naogaon-4
Party	Candidate	Votes	%	±%
AL	Emaz Uddin Pramanik	60,349	79.5	+75.2
Jatiya Party (M)	Saidur Rahman	9,965	13.1	N/A
JP(E)	Md. Enamul Haque	4,793	6.3	N/A
Independent	Md. Afzal Hossain	828	1.1	N/A
Majority		50,384	66.4	+56.1
Turnout		75,935	28.9	−64.7
AL gain from Independent				

=== Elections in the 2000s ===
General Election 2008: Naogaon-4
Party	Candidate	Votes	%	±%
Independent	Emaz Uddin Pramanik	115,576	52.7	N/A
BNP	Shamsul Alam Pramanik	92,899	42.3	−12.5
AL	SM Abdul Latif	9,427	4.3	−39.4
CPB	Rawnak Zahan	1,116	0.5	N/A
BDB	Abdus Salam Mondol	394	0.2	N/A
Majority		22,677	10.3	−0.8
Turnout		219,412	93.6	+5.3
Independent gain from BNP				

General Election 2001: Naogaon-4
Party	Candidate	Votes	%	±%
BNP	Shamsul Alam Pramanik	101,262	54.8	+7.2
AL	Emaz Uddin Pramanik	80,796	43.7	+7.9
IJOF	Md. Abdul Sattar Sarder	2,201	1.2	N/A
Bangladesh Samyabadi Dal (Marxist-Leninist)	Pradhyut Kumer Foni	349	0.2	N/A
Jatiya Party (M)	Md. Akbar Hossain Sarder	220	0.1	N/A
Majority		20,466	11.1	−0.7
Turnout		184,828	88.3	+3.4
BNP hold				

=== Elections in the 1990s ===
General Election June 1996: Naogaon-4
Party	Candidate	Votes	%	±%
BNP	Shamsul Alam Pramanik	69,919	47.6	+36.7
AL	Emaz Uddin Pramanik	52,596	35.8	−2.3
Jamaat	Nasir Uddin	22,389	15.2	−34.6
JP(E)	Md. Emamul Haque	1,758	1.2	+0.3
Zaker Party	Md. Fazlul Haque Khan	324	0.2	0.0
Majority		17,323	11.8	+0.1
Turnout		146,986	84.9	+12.0
BNP gain from Jamaat				

General Election 1991: Naogaon-4
Party	Candidate	Votes	%	±%
Jamaat	Nasir Uddin	59,801	49.8	
AL	Emaz Uddin Pramanik	45,794	38.1	
BNP	Md. Afaz Uddin Mondol	13,100	10.9	
JP(E)	Kafil Uddin	1,119	0.9	
Zaker Party	Md. Fazlul Haq Khan	258	0.2	
Jatiya Samajtantrik Dal-JSD	Shree Animesh Chndra Das	82	0.1	
Majority		14,007	11.7	
Turnout		120,154	72.9	
Jamaat gain from				
