= Zahidunnabi Dewan Shamim =

Bangladeshi physician, biomedical researcher, politician

Zahidunnabi Dewan (Zahid Dewan Shamim)
- Born: 25 December 1968 (age 57); Bagmara, Rajshahi, East Pakistan, Pakistan
- Education: Rajshahi Medical College; Tokyo Medical and Dental University
- Scientific career
- Fields: Biomedicine
- Workplaces: New York University School of Medicine

Zahidunnabi Dewan (Zahid Dewan Shamim) (born 25 December 1968) is a Bangladeshi physician and biomedical researcher. He has been working as a scientist at New York School Medicine, US since 2007. He is conducting research on cancer biology and immunology.

== Biography ==
Zahidunnabi Dewan (Zahid Dewan Shamim) was born on 25 December 1968 to a middle-class Bangali Muslim family in the village of Jamalpur, Gonipur-Bagmara, Rajshahi. His father was A.F. Nurunnabi Dewan and his mother Jahanara Dewan.

He started his early education at village Jamalpur Primary School. He then moved to Dhaka and completed his Secondary and Higher Secondary School Certificate exam and entered in Rajshahi Medical College in 1988. He received his MBBS degree from Rajshahi Medical College in 1995 and PhD in cancer biology and immunology from Tokyo Medical and Dental University, Japan in 2004.

== Professional career ==
After receiving MBBS in 1995, Zahid Dewan Shamim started his career as a trainee medical officer in Rajshahi Medical College Hospital. He started his new job as emergency medical officer at Habiganj District Hospital in 1998. He started working as a scientist at Tokyo Medical and Dental University, Japan after receiving his PhD in 2004. He moved to the United States in 2007 and started work as a scientist at New York University School of Medicine. His research activities are focused on understanding and investigating the role of NF-kappaB transcription pathway and immune cells (especially T and NK cells) in cancer growth and metastasis and viral infection and to develop a novel anticancer and antiviral therapies (both pharmacological and immunotherapy). He has published more than 30 research articles in peer-reviewed international journals. His research works have been cited by more than 2000 research articles published in peer-reviewed journals.
