= Ehsan Hoque =

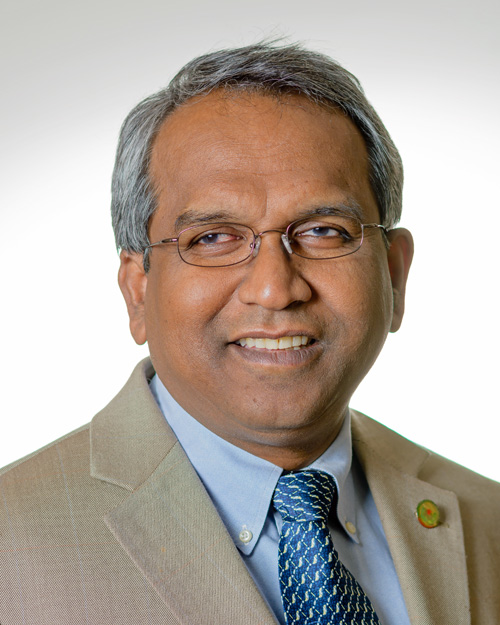
Ehsan Hoque, Founder & Honorary Executive Director of Distressed Children & Infants International

Ehsan Hoque (born March 13, 1964) is a medical doctor, social entrepreneur, child rights activist, and climate & environmental activist. He is the founder and honorary executive director of Distressed Children & Infants International, an international non-profit organization based in the United States that works with underprivileged children and their families to stop child labor, extend educational opportunities, and provide access to healthcare.

== Early life and education ==
Dr. Hoque was born in Barisal, Bangladesh to A.N. Shamsul Hoque (a professor of political science and public administration at Duke University, Dhaka University and at Rajshahi University) and Hasina Begum, in 1964. He was born with congenital cataracts, and by the age of five had undergone seven eye surgeries, which partially restored his vision. At the time cataract surgery was uncommon in Bangladesh. Despite his family and physician advising him against prolonged studying and suggesting he not attend school due to his impaired vision, he persevered in his studies. By 1987 he had graduated from Rajshahi Medical College to become a medical doctor. He completed his Ph.D. in 1995 at Asahikawa Medical College (Japan) and his postdoctoral fellowship in 1997 at the University of Western Ontario (Canada).

== Career ==
Over the course of his career, Hoque has worked at numerous institutes around the world, including Rajshahi Medical College Hospital (Bangladesh), Dhaka Shishu Hospital (Bangladesh), Asahikawa Medical University (Japan), University of Western Ontario (Canada), University of Toronto (Canada), and Yale University School of Medicine (US). His research has focused on cardiovascular pharmacology and physiology, concentrating on ischemic reperfusion injury of the heart, and neuroendocrinology with a focus on aging. Hoque has published his work in various scientific journals and presented his findings at national and international conferences. He has also been the recipient of numerous academic honors, including a Monbusho Scholarship from the Japanese Ministry of Education, research awards from the Heart & Stroke Foundation of Ontario, the University of Toronto Research Fellowship, and the Hartford Foundation Fellowship.

== Major scientific achievements ==
In 1995 Ehsan Hoque discovered that Lysophosphatidylcholine (LPC), a toxic substance which accumulates in the ischemic myocardium when applied exogenously, causes ischemia-like changes, suggesting that LPC is one of the important factors in producing ischemia-reperfusion derangements in terms of mechanical and metabolic functions. He also found that prevention of LPC accumulation can protect heart from ischemia/reperfusion injury.

In 1997 Ehsan Hoque was the first to demonstrate the potential protective effect of NHE (Na+-H+ Exchange) inhibition on Lysophosphatidylcholine (LPC) -induced cardiac injury.

== Activism ==
Distressed Children & Infants International
- Founded: May 24, 2003
- Founder: Ehsan Hoque
- Type: NGO
- Location: Cheshire, CT
- Region served: Bangladesh, India, Nepal, Nicaragua
- Website: www.distressedchildren.org

In 1995, Hoque started supporting the education of 50 children to save them from child labor, and in the process realized a more systematic approach was necessary to help the many more children suffering the same fate in Bangladesh and elsewhere. This inspired him to form a non-governmental organization to prevent school dropouts on a large scale by providing comprehensive support through child sponsorship, creating a safety net, and involving school authorities and the community in the process.

In 2003, while working at Yale University, together with his wife Nina Hoque and his colleague Dr. Brian DeBroff he founded Distressed Children & Infants International, or DCI. The organization's mission is to reduce the extreme poverty that contributes to child labor by providing quality education, family support, and access to healthcare with a focus on eliminating preventable blindness.

Hoque founded DCI's Sun Child Sponsorship Program, which now supports over 1500 children in Bangladesh. DCI operates several other programs in Bangladesh that provide healthcare, vision care, and orphan support, and also provides support to partner organizations with similar missions in India, Nepal, and Nicaragua. These efforts have benefited thousands of children and their families while also providing opportunities for American youth to connect with less fortunate around the world through volunteerism: a central organizational concept to DCI that Hoque calls "children helping children".

The program runs a biennial Conference on Child Rights & Sight: an international conference hosted by DCI and Yale University to raise awareness about child rights, particularly with respect to child labor, and diseases that affect vision. The event gathers speakers and leaders from around the world to address these issues and discuss creative solutions. The 7th conference took place at Yale in October 2019.

== Social and humanitarian awards ==
- Bangladesh Medical Association of North America (BMANA) Florida Chapter Humanitarian Award, 2023
- Non-Resident Bangladeshis (NRB) Excellence Award, 2022
- Humanitarian Award by Bangladesh National Woman Lawyers' Association (BNWLA), 2022
- Special Recognition Award at Rotary International RID 3281, Conference, March 2022
- Mother Teresa Golden Award, 2021
- Humanitarian Award by Bangladesh Association of New England (BANE), 2021
- Humanitarian Award by Rajshahi Government College in Bangladesh, 2020
- Cambridge Mayor Award, City of Cambridge, Massachusetts, USA, 2019
- All European Bangladesh Association (AEBA) Humanitarian Award, 2019
- Bangladesh Medical Association of North America (BMANA) New York Chapter Humanitarian Award, 2018
- Soc. of Bangladeshi Doctors in Queensland, Bangladesh Medical Soc. of Australia Humanitarian Award, 2018
- Bangladesh Medical Association of North America (BMANA) California Chapter Humanitarian Award (2017)
- ATN Bangla Television Humanitarian Award (2017)
- Rajshahi Medical College Humanitarian Award (2016)
- North America Bangladesh Convention (NABC) Award, 2014

== Scientific publications ==
He has published more than a dozen peer-reviewed articles in scholarly journals. The three most highly cited are:

- Chakrabarti, S; Hoque, ANE; Karmazyn, M (1997). "A rapid ischemia-induced apoptosis in isolated rat hearts and its attenuation by the sodium-hydrogen exchange inhibitor HOE 642 (cariporide)". J Mol Cell Cardiol. 29 (11): 3169–74. doi:10.1006/jmcc.1997.0561. PMID 9405190. (cited 159 times)
- Gros, R; Afroze, T; You, XM; Kabir, G; Van Wert, R; Kalair, W; Hoque, AE; Mungrue, IN; Husain, M (2003). "Plasma membrane calcium ATPase overexpression in arterial smooth muscle increases vasomotor responsiveness and blood pressure". Circ Res. 93 (7): 614–21. doi:10.1161/01.RES.0000092142.19896.D9. PMID 12933703. (cited 94 times)
- Hoque, ANE; Haist, JV; Karmazyn, M (1997). "Na(+)-H+ exchange inhibition protects against mechanical, ultrastructural, and biochemical impairment induced by low concentrations of lysophosphatidylcholine in isolated rat hearts". Circ Res. 80 (1): 95–102. doi:10.1161/01.res.80.1.95. PMID 8978328. (cited 72 times)
