= Distressed Children & Infants International =

U.S.-based nonprofit organization

Distressed Children & Infants International (DCI)
- Abbreviation: DCI
- Founded: May 24, 2003
- Founder: Ehsan Hoque; Nina Hoque
- Type: NGO
- Purpose: To defend child rights and provide for the basic needs of distressed children, giving them opportunities for education, healthcare and future economic possibilities
- Location: Cambridge, Massachusetts, United States
- Region served: Bangladesh, India, Nepal, Nicaragua
- Website: distressedchildren.org

Distressed Children & Infants International (DCI) is a U.S.-based non-profit organization established at Yale University in 2003 and currently headquartered in Cambridge, Massachusetts.

DCI currently supports initiatives for children in Bangladesh, India, Nepal, and Nicaragua. It works to accomplish its mission through five core programs: its flagship "Sun Child Sponsorship" Program, Healthcare for the Underprivileged Program, Orphan Support Program, Blindness Prevention Program, and its "Journey for Rights and Sight" – an ongoing series of awareness-building events throughout the United States and beyond. DCI works to implement its mission with a number of partner organizations including Rights and Sight for Children (Bangladesh), Diabetic Association of Bangladesh (Bangladesh), Ispahani Eye Hospital (Bangladesh), Tauri Foundation (Bangladesh), Kalinga Eye Hospital and Research Centre (India), Nepal Netra Jyoti Sangh (Nepal), and New Haven/León Sister City Project (Nicaragua).

== Mission ==
DCI describes its mission using two phrases: "Rights and Sight for Children" – to protect child rights, stop child labor, stop child marriage, and help families lift themselves out of poverty through education, healthcare, vision care, and income-generating opportunities; and "Children Helping Children" – to connect American youth to less fortunate children in other countries, educating them about the challenges facing children worldwide and inspiring them to take leadership roles in humanitarian causes.

== History ==
Distressed Children & Infants International (DCI) was founded on May 23, 2003, at Yale University by current Honorary Executive Director Ehsan Hoque and Board Chair Nina Hoque at the Yale School of Medicine. DCI was officially recognized as a non-profit charitable organization by the United States Government and the Office of the Connecticut Secretary of the State in 2005.

== Programs ==
=== Sun Child Sponsorship Program ===
DCI's Flagship "Sun Child Sponsorship" Program was inaugurated in Bangladesh in 2005 and operates in the regions of Patuakhali, Feni, Habiganj, Nilphamari and Dhaka. According to DCI, the program utilizes a comprehensive poverty alleviation model that focuses on individual children while bringing lasting change on a community-wide scale. The program's primary objective is to provide severely underprivileged children with the resources they need to stay in school and continue their learning and education, instead of having to enter the labor force, and thereafter keeping them on track to become independent and productive citizens through education and training opportunities. In addition, the program provides health care as well as family and community support in the form of small business development and adult education.

=== Healthcare for the Underprivileged Program ===
DCI's Health for the Underprivileged Program has operated in Dhaka, Bangladesh since 2008. Through a free clinic located within Kallayanpur slum, DCI provides free preventive and curative treatment, including maternal health care, to a community of approximately 9000 slum residents. The clinic operates six days per week and provides free treatment and medicine. Additionally, DCI employs social workers who visit homes to identify health needs and connect patients, especially women and children, with appropriate treatment. The workers educate women on how to better take care of their health care needs and provides information about hospital delivery of newborns. The clinic also runs awareness classes for adolescent girls with the goal of preventing child marriage and teaching female health and hygiene skills.

=== Blindness Prevention Program ===
DCI's Blindness Prevention Program was launched in 2007, with the objective of preventing and treating vision loss among underprivileged children and their families. Through this program, DCI conducts free eye screening camps and awareness campaigns for the visually disabled in all of its project locations in Bangladesh, as well as providing eyeglasses to correct refractive errors and arranging free cataract surgeries for children and adults. Similar efforts are also supported with partner organizations in India and Nepal.

=== Orphan Support Program ===
The orphan support program provides support to orphaned children either living in government or non-government orphanages or living with their extended family. The program has been operating since 2008. It gives support for basic necessities special day meals, education, training, adolescent counseling, health, and vision care, as well as supplemental support to local non-government and government-run orphanages.

=== Journey for Child Rights & Sight and International Conference ===
DCI regularly holds events throughout the United States to raise awareness about issues affecting children such as child poverty, child labor, and preventable childhood blindness.

In 2006, DCI hosted its first "Conference on Child Rights & Sight" at Yale University: an international conference that gathers speakers and leaders from around the world to address issues of child rights – in particular child labor – and diseases that affect vision, and discuss creative solutions. As of 2020, DCI has held seven international conferences at Yale University: in 2006, 2009, 2011, 2013, 2015, 2017 and 2019. The most recent 7th International Conference on Child Rights & Sight took place at Yale University on Saturday, October 26, 2019.

== Patrons and Goodwill Ambassadors ==
DCI's Patrons and Goodwill Ambassadors include Bangladeshi actress Babita Akhtar and Bangladeshi singer Sabina Yasmin.

== Financial accountability ==
According to DCI, 91% of its funds go to program services (childcare, orphan support, blindness prevention, etc.), 6% goes to fundraising, and 3% goes to management and administration. DCI states that 100 percent of all proceeds from program contributions are used to cover the costs of DCI programs and services, with no portion being used to cover administrative or fundraising costs.
