= Manda Upazila =

Subdistrict in Naogaon district in Rajshahi Division, Bangladesh

Manda Upazila মান্দা উপজেলা
- Subdistrict
- Manda
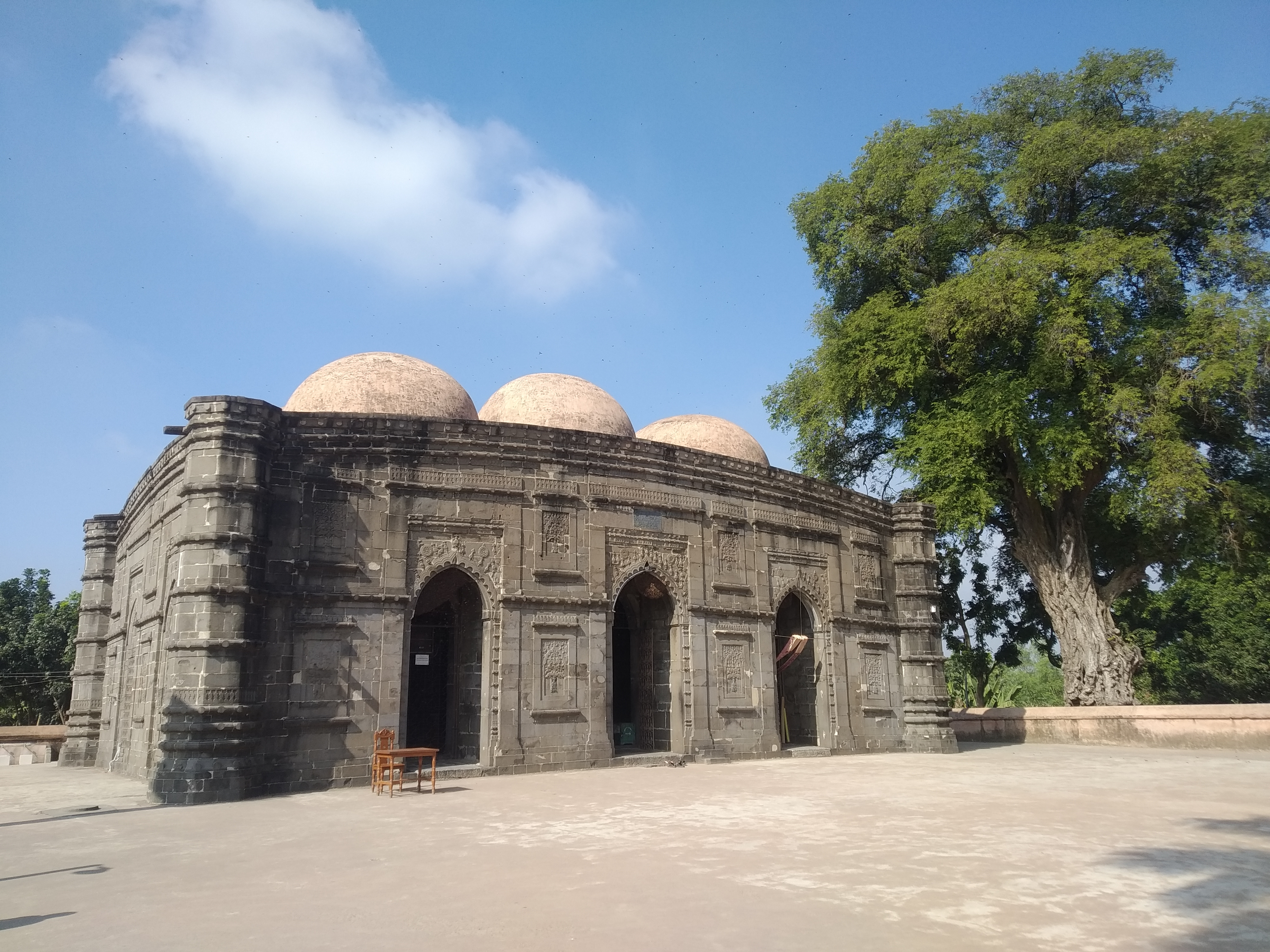
- Kusumba Mosque, Manda upazila

- Coordinates: 24°46.5′N 88°40.2′E
- Country: Bangladesh
- Division: Rajshahi
- District: Naogaon
- Founder: British Government

Government
  - Body: Upazila Nirbahi Officer

Area
  - Subdistrict: 375.93 km^{2} (145.15 sq mi)
  - Metro: 4.3 km^{2} (1.7 sq mi)

Population (2022)
  - Subdistrict: 380,588
  - Density: 1,012.4/km^{2} (2,622.1/sq mi)
- Time zone: UTC+6 (BST)
- Postal code: 6511
- Website: manda.naogaon.gov.bd mandaupazila.blogspot.com
- Bangladesh Bureau of Statistics (2011) & Journey Book Documentation Survey (2023)

Manda Upazila mauza geocode map

Manda Upazila mauza geocode map

Manda (Bengali: মান্দা উপজেলা) is an Upazila in the Naogaon District of Rajshahi Division, Bangladesh.

== History ==
- During the War of Independence in 1971, the Pakistan army killed 128 pro-independence supporters and individuals at village Pakuria of Bharsho Union and buried them in 3-4 ditches.
- During the Bangladesh War of Independence in 1971, the Pakistan army killed 17 people and burned a whole village, Monhorpur (Manoharpur) of Paranpur Union and buried them in a mass grave.

== Geography ==
Map of Naogaon District

Manda is located at 24.7750°N 88.6694°E. It has 97,219 households and total area 375.93 km^{2}. It is bounded by Mahadebpur upazila on the north, Bagmara and Mohanpur upazilas on the south, Naogaon sadar, Raninagar and Atrai upazilas on the east, Niamatpur and Tanore upazilas on the west. Its major rivers are the Atrai and Shiba.

== Demographics ==
Religions in Manda Upazila (2022)
Religion	Percent
Islam	90.88%
Hinduism	8.75%
Ethnic religion	0.30%
Other or not stated	0.07%

According to the 2022 Bangladeshi census, Manda Upazila had 110,075 households and a population of 380,588. 7.66% of the population were under 5 years of age. Manda had a literacy rate (age 7 and over) of 68.30%: 72.78% for males and 64.10% for females, and a sex ratio of 94.87 males for every 100 females. 27,954 (7.34%) lived in urban areas. Ethnic population is 3,734 (0.98%), of which 1,690 are Munda and 1,189 are Oraon.

According to the 2011 Census of Bangladesh, Manda Upazila had 97,219 households and a population of 363,858. 66,742 (18.34%) were under 10 years of age. Manda had a literacy rate (age 7 and over) of 46.27%, compared to the national average of 51.8%, and a sex ratio of 1021 females per 1000 males. 12,471 (3.43%) lived in urban areas. Ethnic population was 3,960 (1.09%), of which Santal were 935 and Oraon 740.

== Points of interest ==
=== Location ===
On the west bank of Atrai river, under the Manda upazila of Naogaon district, the mosque named Kusumba is situated.

=== History ===
Kusumba Mosque is named after the village Kusumba. It was built during the period of Afgan rule in Bangladesh by a high-ranking official named Sulaiman. It was built under one of the last Suri rulers. His name was Ghiyasuddin Bahadur Shah. Although the mosque was built under the suri rule, the architectural pattern was not influenced by the earlier Suri architecture of North India. It was constructed with a Bengal style. At the eastern central entrance, inscription mentioned the time period of construction of the mosque to 966 AH (1558-59 AD).

=== Current Condition ===
The mosque was badly damaged during the earthquake in 1987. Kushumba mosque is also known as Kala Pahar, Kala Rotno which means Black Pearl. Possible reason: During the massive earthquake of 1897 the mosque was damaged severely, but stood firmly. Another reason can be for such name is the black plaster of stones at the outer wall. Now the mosque is protected by the Department of Archaeology of Bangladesh. The mosque is an attraction that is marveled at and studied, due its wonderful architectural style and elaborate decorations.

=== Structure ===
The mosque lies inside a walled enclosure with a monumental gateway with standing spaces for guards. The inscription tablet is totally in Arabic, except the part "built by" is in Persian.Walking up to the mosque, visitors will be greeted by a massive gateway, which is the only entrance to the mosque that is protected by a surrounding wall. One can almost imagine the guards outside, still protecting this breathtaking building. The foundation and most of the building was constructed from bricks, although the outer walls, some interior walls, side screens and columns are of stone. Bunches of grapes and vines curve in an almost serpentine manner on the mihrab frames, and kalasas, tendrils, and rosettes are reduced to dots. The platform edge has grape vine decoration, and there are rosettes on the spandrels of the arches supporting the platform, as well as on the mihrab wall. The central Mihrab is designed in the west. Opposite the central and southeastern entrances, the interior west wall has two mihrabs. There is division in the two mihrabs and they had different platforms. That is because the time of construction the general public was separated from officials and nobility during the prayers.

== Administration ==
Manda Thana was formed in 1943 and it was turned into an upazila in 1987.

Manda Upazila is divided into 14 union parishads: Bhalain, Bharso, Bishnupur, Ganeshpur, Kalikapur, Kansopara, Kashab, Kusumba, Manda, Moinam, Nurullabad, Paranpur, Proshadpur, and Tentulia. The union parishads are subdivided into 299 mauzas and 293 villages.

== Education ==
- Alalpur Haji Sheikh Alam High School
- Baidiapur High School
- Balubazar S.M. High School
- Balubazar Shafiuddin Molla College
- Bandubi Hazi Ismail Hossen High School
- Bathoil Gopal Pramanik High School
- Bharso High School
- Bilkorilla B.M. High School
- Chakkamdeb Technical and BM college
- Chakuli Bahumokhi Madhumik Biddaloy
- Chakuli Degree College
- Chakuli High School
- Daspara Degree College
- Daspara High School
- Ekrukhi High School
- Engr: Showkatara Apple school and college
- Fotapur Kolimuddin College
- Ghona Adorshah High School & College
- Goal Manda High School
- Gobindapur High School
- Got Gari Shaheed Mamun High School and College
- Jotbazer Girls' School and College
- Kaligram Dodangi High School
- Kalikapur Chak Kalikapur High School
- Kanchan B.L High School
- Kanso Para Uccho Biddaloy
- Koyapara Kamarkuri High School
- Kusumba D.P.B High School
- Mainam High School & College
- Manda Business Management Institute
- Manda Momin Shahana Govt. Degree College
- Manda Pilot High School & College
- Nurullabad M/L High School
- P.K.A. High School
- Paranpur High School
- Pakuria United High School
- Panial Adarsha College
- Prashadpur Girls High School
- Ramnagar Government primary & high school
- Satihat K.T. High School
- Shafiuddin Mollha College, Balubazar
- Shahapur D.A. High School
- Singihat K.D School
- South Mainam High School & College
- Tentulia D.B. High School
- Turuk Baria High School

=== Madrasas ===
- Banishar Dakhil Madrasha
- Bolshing Chakbabon Dakhil Madrasha
- Boro Belal Daho Fazil Madrasha
- Boro Belal Daho Fazil Madrasha (ALAMGIR HOSEN)
- Borobelaldaho fazil madrasha (ALAMGIR HOSEN)
- Chakuli Koumi Madrasha
- Chalkharinarayan Dhakhil Madrsha
- Chhoto Chalk Champak Dakhil Madrasah
- Deul Durgapur Al Arabia Dakhil Madrasha
- Dusti Dakhil Madrasha
- Fotepur Dakhil Madrasha(1963)
- Jafrabad Adorsho Dakhil Madrasha
- Khodarghat Dakhil Madrasha
- Kukrail Abtadai Madrasha
- Paranpur Kamil Madrasha
- Ramnagar Dhakil madrasa
- Zafrabad Adorso Dakhil Madrasha

== Notable residents ==
- Emaz Uddin Pramanik, MP
- Shamsul Alam Pramanik, MP

== See also ==
- Upazilas of Bangladesh
- Districts of Bangladesh
- Divisions of Bangladesh
