= Kusumba Mosque =

Mosque in Naogaon District, Bangladesh

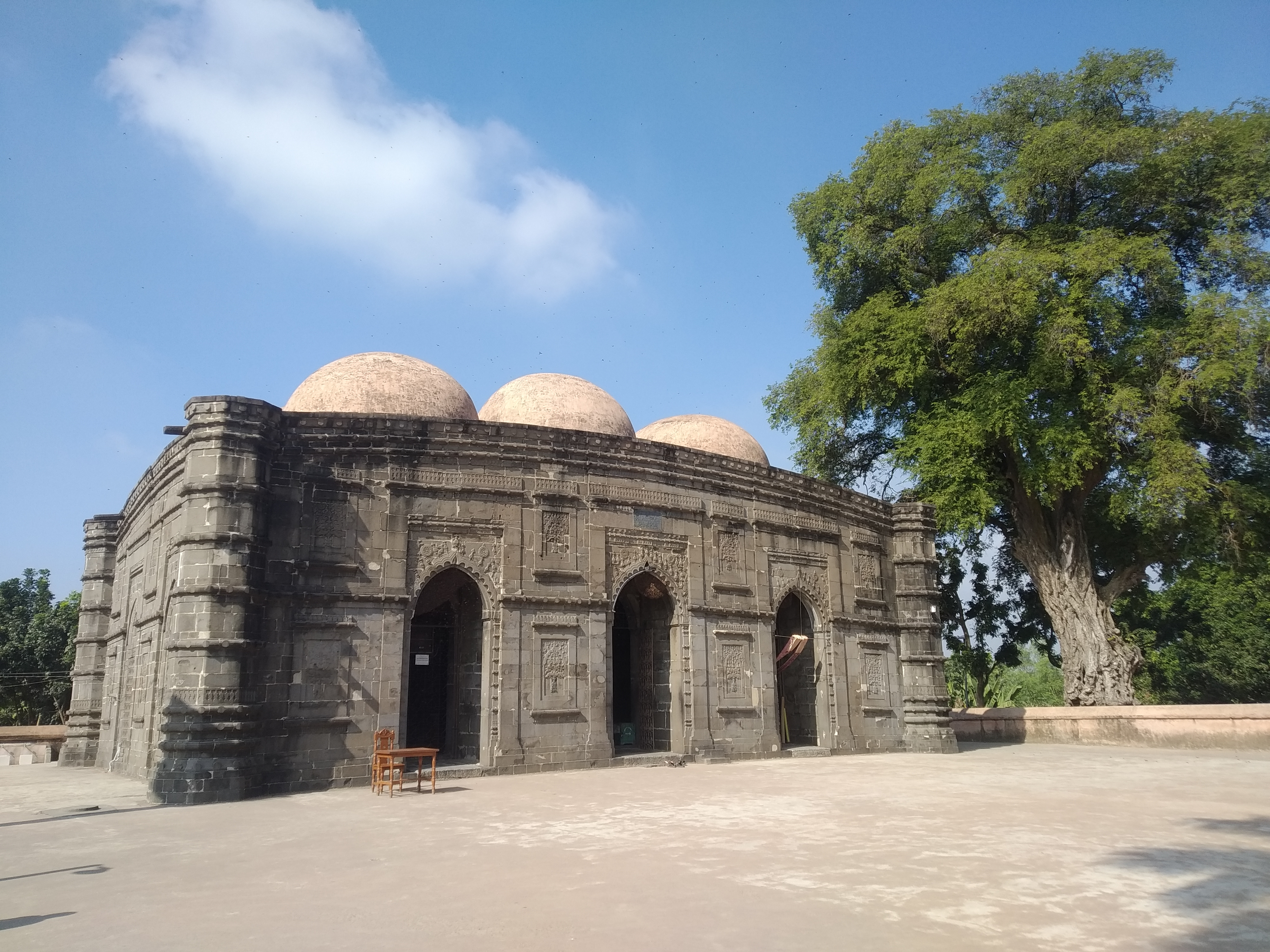
- Kusumba Mosque, Naogaon in 2021

- Location of the mosque in Bangladesh

Religion
- Affiliation: Islam
- Ecclesiastical or organisational status: Mosque
- Status: Active

Location
- Location: Naogaon District, Rajshahi Division
- Country: Bangladesh
- Coordinates: 24°45′13″N 88°40′53″E

Architecture
- Type: Mosque architecture
- Style: Islamic
- Groundbreaking: 1558
- Completed: 1559; 467 years ago

Specifications
- Length: 18 m (58 ft)
- Width: 13 m (42 ft)
- Dome: Three (maybe more)

Kusumba Mosque- The Black Gem of Bangladesh

Kusumba Mosque, 16th Century Islamic Architecture

The Kusumba Mosque (Bengali: কুসুম্বা শাহী মসজিদ) is a mosque, located in the village of Kusumba, in Manda Upazila, Naogaon District, in the Rajshahi Division of Bangladesh. It was completed in 1559, the mosque is one of Bangladesh's national heritages sites. The mosque is often nicknamed "The Black Gem of Bangladesh".

== History ==
Construction on the mosque began in 1558 and ended in 1559, according to an inscription on the exterior of the mosque. During this period, Bangladesh had a string of Afghani rulers. The Kusumba mosque was built under one of the last Suri rulers, named Ghiyasuddin Bahadur Shah. The construction of the mosque was overseen by a high-ranking official named Sulaiman. Although the mosque was built under the Suri rule, the architectural pattern was not influenced by earlier Suri architecture of North India. Instead, the mosque was built in the style of other Bangladeshi mosques The Kusumba Mosque went on to serve as inspiration for other mosques in Bangladesh and Myanmar.

== Current condition ==
The Kusumba Mosque was damaged by an earthquake in 1897. This earthquake almost entirely destroyed the external wall that used to surround the mosque and many parts of the mosque, especially the domes on top of the mosque. Although the earthquake caused severe damage, the main structure of the Kusumba Mosque survived. This might be a possible reason that the mosque is nicknamed Kala Pahar (কালা পাহাড়), meaning black mountain, or Kala Rotno (কালা রত্ন) which means Black Gem. Another possible reason for these nicknames comes from the original external wall that used to surround the mosque, as some sections of the wall were covered in black plaster. Since the original construction of the Kusumba Mosque, it has never been restored. However, some of the external domes damaged in the earthquake were repaired by the Bangladesh Department of Archaeology. The mosque is officially protected by the department.

== Architecture ==
=== Exterior ===
The Kusumba Mosque lies inside a walled enclosure, most of which has been destroyed. This enclosure contained a large gateway entrance to the mosque. This gateway also included structures that served as standing spaces for guards. The original purpose of this external wall was to keep animals and wildlife out.

Outside this enclosure, the mosque is surrounded by various types of greenery. There used to be a water tank to the east of the enclosure (but still on the grounds of the Kusumba Mosque) that was meant to help provide water to local residents for daily household purposes. This water tank would often wet the ground near it, creating mud that was used in the construction of the mosque and the external wall.

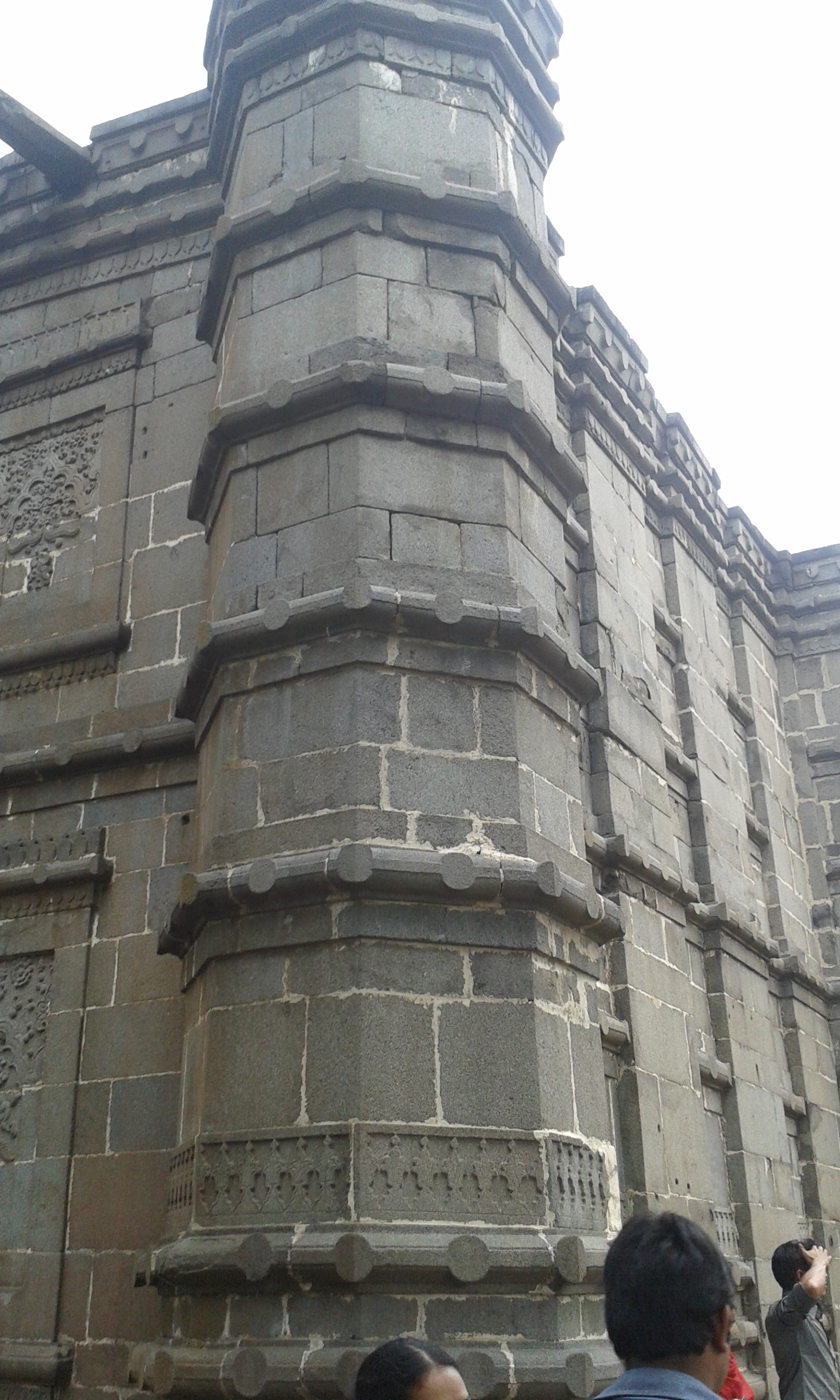
One of the rounded, octagonal towers at the corner of the mosque.

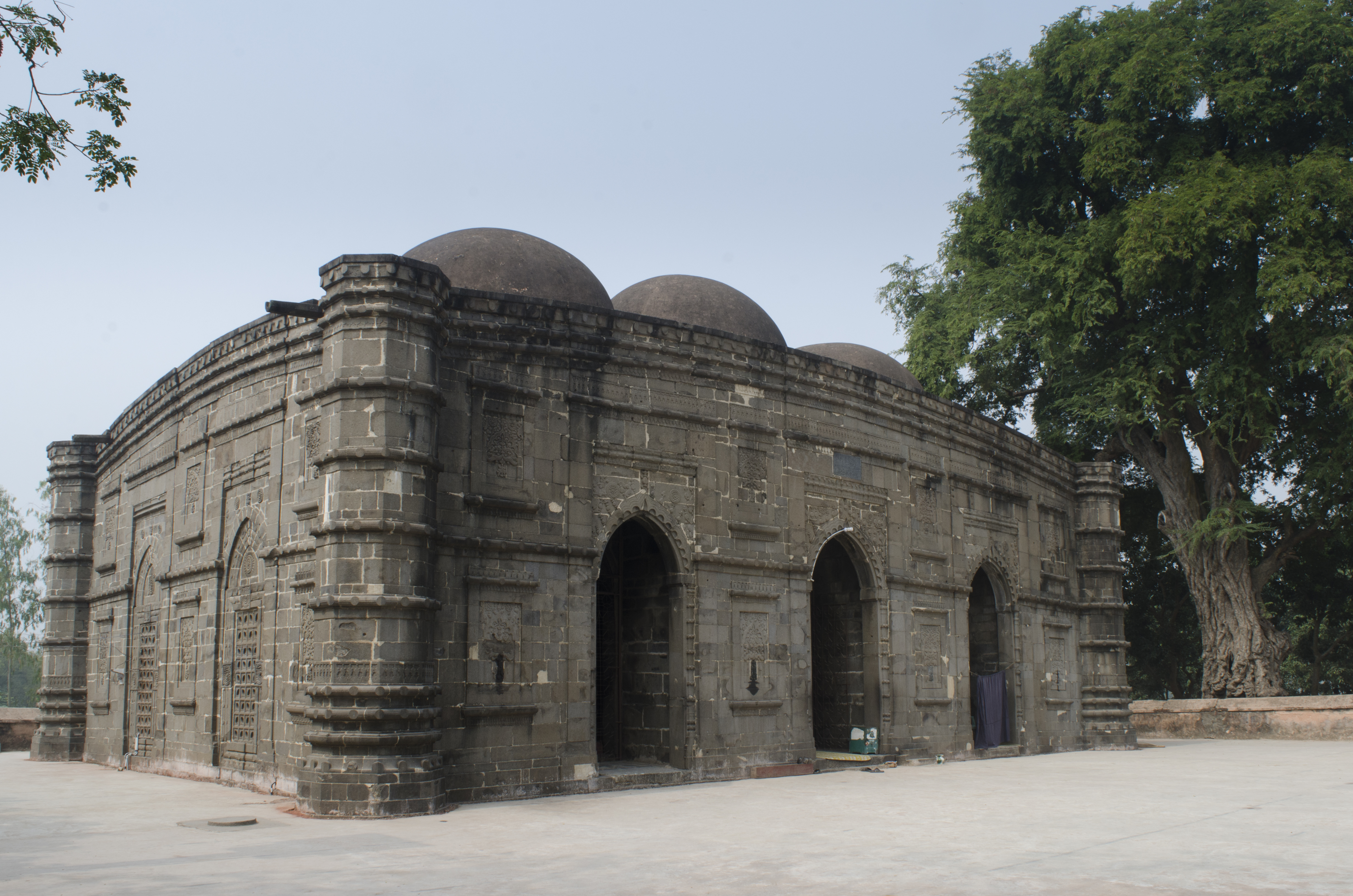
The three multifoiled arches on the eastern wall of the mosque.

While the external wall was built from bricks, the exterior of the mosque and much of the floor inside was made entirely of stone. Three types of stone were used in the construction of the mosque: sandstone, granite, and marble. The shape of the mosque is a basic rectangle with rounded edges. Each of the four corners of the building have rounded, octagonal towers. Along the roof of the mosque, there are stone gutters to drain rainwater. The exterior walls are divided into two parts (top and bottom), separated by mouldings. The mouldings also serve as a border for decorative panels on the exterior of the mosque. The northern and southern exterior walls each have screened windows. The eastern wall of the mosque contains three blind multifoiled arches. This was a new style of arch created with the construction of the Kusumba Mosque, distinguishing it from other mosques in the region. After the mosque was built, local artisans from the Kusumba village became trained in this style of arch. As a result, there are other similar arches in terracotta temples and mosques that were built after the Kusumba mosque. The central arch of these three was the main entrance to the mosque. This arch is decorated with floral motifs, mostly rosettes. These rosettes were a repeated motif and can be found throughout other parts of the Kusumba Mosque.

The exterior walls of the mosque are covered in shallow relief carvings. All the carvings on the external parts of the mosque are quite detailed and were made by skilled artisans. Compared to other mosques in Bangladesh, the work on the Kusumba Mosque is significantly more intricate. On the other hand, the structure of the mosque itself is more simple relative to other Bangladeshi mosques. This is especially visible in the construction of the interior courtyard, which does not contain as many internal structures and features as other Bangladeshi mosques. In addition to these carvings, there is an inscription located on the exterior of the mosque that includes the date of construction and who it was built by. The entire inscription is written in Arabic, specifically in the Tughra writing style. The only exception to this is the part of the inscription indicating who built the mosque. This is written in Persian.

=== Interior ===
The most prominent feature of the interior part of the Kusumba Mosque is the large, open courtyard in the center of the structure. This open architectural style means the mosque is well lit by sunlight and well ventilated by the wind. All the indoor chambers of the mosque and other structures are centered around this courtyard. This allows for a seamless flow between the indoor and outdoor spaces. As a result, some of the chambers in the Kusumba Mosque are not as private and confidential compared to other mosques in the region; people passing by are able to see into the inner parts of the mosque with relative ease.

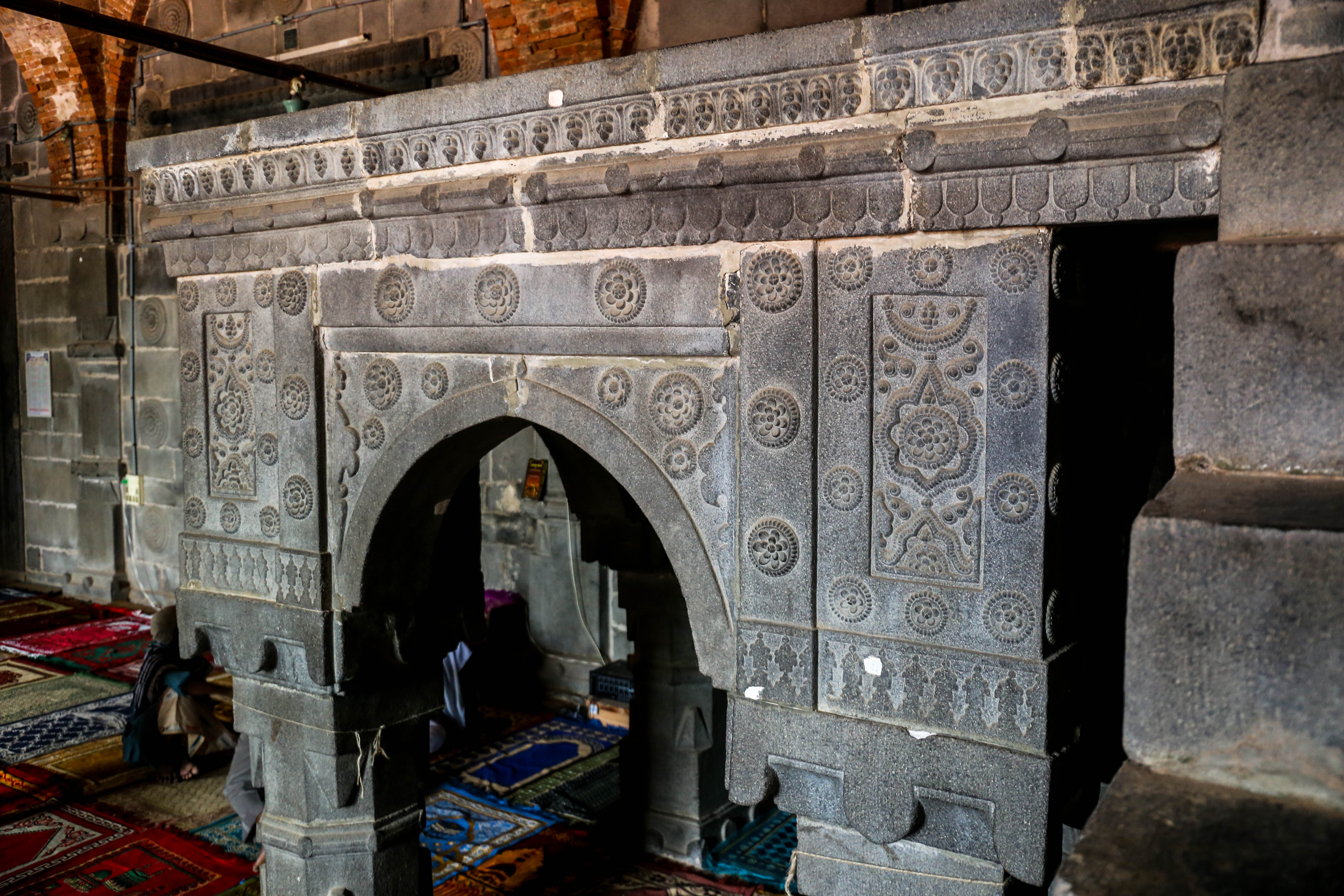
Mihrab in the Kusumba Mosque

While most mosques only contain a singular mihrab, the Kusumba mosque is unique because it has multiple mihrabs. These mihrabs are made of the same stone as the exterior walls of the mosque and the arches of the mihrabs are supported by large pillars. These pillars include tasseled decorations that are attached with chains. All of the mihrabs are decorated with detailed carvings that generally follow a nature theme. The most common carving motifs include fruits, vines, and flowers. The central, main Mihrab is located in the western part of the mosque. Just next to this, on the right, is the part of the mosque dedicated to education and the study of the Quran. The interior western wall of the mosque also contains two more mihrabs. These are located just opposite to the central and southeastern entrances to the interior of the mosque. Each of these mihrabs served different purposes. One was reserved for the prayers of officials and nobility while the other was for the general public. This was a result of the culture of the Kusumba village at the time of construction; it was common practice to separate from the general public from anyone considered important during the time of prayers.

== See also ==
- Islam in Bangladesh
- List of mosques in Bangladesh
- List of archaeological sites in Bangladesh
