= Emaz Uddin Pramanik =

Bangladeshi Politician

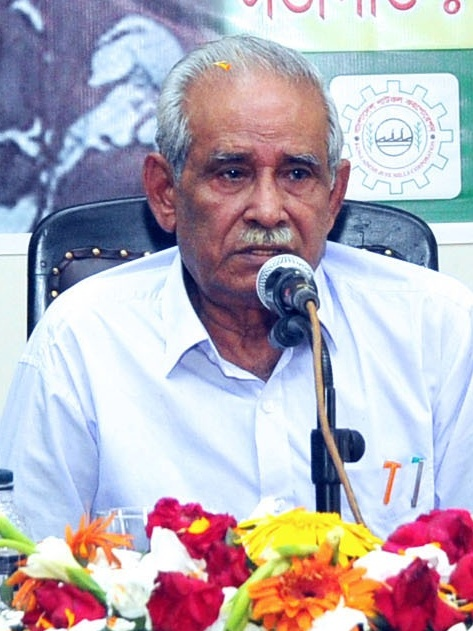
- Pramanik in 2018

Member of Parliament for Naogaon-4
- In office 25 January 2009 – 7 January 2024
- Preceded by: Shamsul Alam Pramanik
- Succeeded by: SM Brohani Sultan Mahmud
- In office 10 July 1986 – 6 December 1987
- Succeeded by: Kafil Uddin Sonar

Minister of Textiles and Jute
- In office 14 January 2014 – 7 January 2019
- Deputy: Mirza Azam (as Minister of State)
- Preceded by: Abdul Latif Siddiqui
- Succeeded by: Golam Dastagir Gazi

Personal details
- Born: 16 February 1941 (age 85)
- Party: Bangladesh Awami League

Emaz Uddin Pramanik (born 16 February 1941) is a Bangladesh Awami League politician who is a former Jatiya Sangsad member from the Naogaon-4 constituency, and a former minister of textiles and jute.

== Career ==
In the 1970 Pakistani general election, Pramanik was elected to parliament for the first time. In the 2018 election, he won for the eighth time including 1970. In 2016, he was awarded Independence Day Award, the highest state award given by the government of Bangladesh, for his contribution in the Bangladesh Liberation War.
