= Rajshahi Medical College =

Medical college in Rajshahi, Bangladesh

- রাজশাহী মেডিকেল কলেজ
- Logo of Rajshahi Medical College
- Type: Public medical school
- Established: 1958
- Academic affiliations: University of Rajshahi & Rajshahi Medical University
- Principal: Khondokar Md. Faisal Alam
- Director: Brigadier General Masud Ul Islam
- Vice Principal: Md. Zahirul Haque
- Academic staff: About 220 teachers
- Administrative staff: About 40
- Students: 1600
- Undergraduates: 1400
- Postgraduates: 200
- Location: Rajshahi, Bangladesh; 24.3723°N 88.5857°E
- Campus: Urban
- Language: English
- Website: rmc.gov.bd

Rajshahi Medical College (RMC) is a public medical school located in Rajshahi, Bangladesh. It is affiliated to the Rajshahi Medical University. The college is affiliated to a large hospital which is the central provider for advanced health care in the northern part of Bangladesh.

== History ==
After the partition of India in 1947, the people of the Rajshahi region were deprived of medical education and healthcare facilities. In 1949, some renowned members of civil society and political personalities involved in the administration took the initiative to establish a private medical school in Rajshahi City. Initially, they launched the LMF (Licentiate of Medical Faculty) diploma course under the State Medical Faculty, Dhaka. Eighty students were admitted into the first batch. In 1954, the erstwhile Pakistani government converted it into a government medical college. In 1958, it was launched as a full-fledged college.

The first heads of the Departments of Anatomy and Physiology were Lieutenant Colonel Gias Uddin Ahmed—who was also the first principal of this college—and Nayeb Ali. There were 43 students in the first batch, including 2 female students, and only 5 college staff members. The college and hospital premises are set up on 90 acres of land. The three-story, 530-bed hospital was built in 1965 and included medicine, surgery, and gynaecology-obstetrics departments. This hospital's premises stand on 60 acres of land, which was previously agricultural land. A 20-bed infectious disease hospital, a leprosy control centre, and a 150-bed Sadar hospital were affiliated with this hospital. Subsequently, the Sadar Hospital was converted into a dental unit.

At present, Bachelor of Medicine, Bachelor of Surgery (MBBS), Bachelor of Dental Surgery (BDS), and postgraduate courses in different subjects are running at this college. The BDS course was launched in 1992 and the postgraduate courses in 1998. The General Medical Council of the UK recognized this medical college on 1 July 1992. Many doctors and students of this college participated in the Liberation War of Bangladesh in 1971. A Shahid Minar was built in front of the administrative building in 1974.

== College infrastructure ==
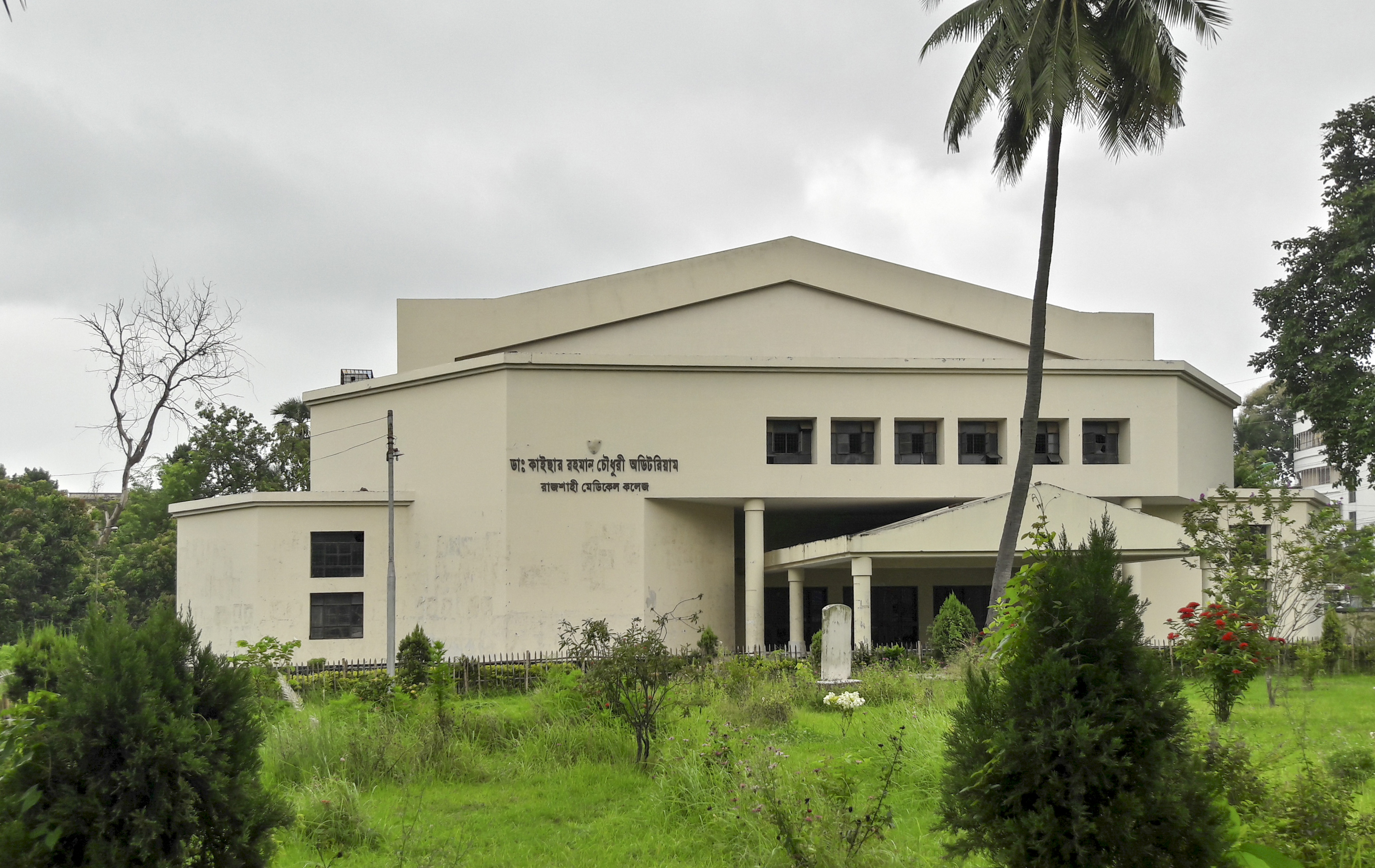
Dr. Kaisar Rahman Chowdhury Auditorium, Rajshahi Medical College

There are four galleries with computer multimedia projector, nine laboratories, two museums, two dissection rooms, one autopsy room, one library and two common rooms for students. A new pharmacology building was built to the east side of the main premises in 1990. To the east of this building, a magnificent, modern, sophisticated auditorium was built in 1995 which is air-conditioned and contains 1000 seats. It is known as Kaisar Rahman Chowdhury Auditorium. A new building for forensic medicine has been built recently to north-east side of the main building. It was launched in 2010. Besides, there is a nursing institute in the college premises. In the college library, there are approximately 19500 books including both new and old editions and 60 medical journals of both home and abroad. Medical education unit of library provides with all modern facilities with internet browsing. The Research cell of college helps both students and doctors in research. The teacher's organisation of Rajshahi medical college publishes a bi-annual medical journal named 'TAJ' which is recognised by BMDC.

There are two hostels for male students. They are Shahid Muktijuddha Kaji Nurunnobbi hostel and Shahid Shah Mainul Ahsan Pinku hostel. Polin, Falguni and Ayesha Siddiqa are for female. Ayesha Siddiqa hostel was inaugurated in 2006. Shahid Jamil Akhtar Raton hostel is for male and another one for female internee doctors. There is a college bus for students which ply on different routes of the city regularly.

A canteen was opened firstly beside the hospital kitchen which was shifted to the north side of the pathology department in a tin shed room in 1963. Henceforth, in 1982 a brick-built one storied building was built instead of tin shed room. This canteen is now well known as "Charu Mamar Canteen". Moreover, another new canteen was launched beside Pinku hostel in 2006.

== Hospital infrastructure ==
The three storied hospital building with 530 beds was launched in April 1965. Another new four storied building has been built in an empty space at the centre of main building which was inaugurated in 2012. The new building will provide 352 new beds, 6 operation theatres, one power substation and corridors to other buildings. It has a foundation of 10 stories. With this new building RMCH has now 862 beds. To the north side of Operation Theater a building has been built for 10 bed ICU in 2012, moreover a burn unit and plastic surgery department was inaugurated in 2014 at the same building. Coronary care unit was set up in 1984. In 1990 this unit was modernised to open Cardiology department. In 2014 cardiology ward was extended and shifted to newly built four storied building. Coronary angiogram and pacemaker implantation are performed here regularly since 2007. Nephrology and Neurosurgery department was set up in 1991. Hemodialysis is being done here since 2004. Paediatric surgery and Neuromedicine department was launched respectively in 1993 and 1994. Cobalt-60 machine is available since 1996 for cancer treatment. Nuclear medicine department was set up here in 1969. OCC centre was opened in this hospital in 2002 to give medical and legal help to the oppressed women. CT scan and MRI have been launched in Radiology and Imaging department in 2005. Endoscopy and colonoscopy are done here since 2007. BDS course was launched here as dental unit in 1992. Nine students were admitted in first batch. New building has been built for dental college in old Sadar hospital. A decision to establish a dental college is in the cards.

== Controversy ==
On 14 February 2018, ATM Enamul Zahir, an associate professor of University of Rajshahi, was assaulted by a group of intern doctors of Rajshahi Medical College on the hospital premises. The professor went to the hospital that night to visit a relative who was admitted there. Around 11:00 p.m., he unintentionally collided with a female intern doctor named Merry Priyanka. He and Priyanka then allegedly hurled abuse at each other. Priyanka then called up her fellow intern doctor Mirza Kamal Hossen. Kamal and the other intern doctors then rushed to the spot and beat up the professor. The professor had been heavily wounded and was admitted to the hospital. He was later admitted to a hospital in Dhaka. Students of University of Rajshahi held protests and demanded arrest and exemplary punishment for the intern doctors involved in the assault.

== Notable alumni ==
- Quazi Tariqul Islam
- Kedar Narsingh KC
- Susane Giti
- Shamil Uddin Ahmed Shimul
- Mohammad Shamshad Ali
- A. A. M. Mesbahul Haq
- Ehsan Hoque
- Govinda K.C.
- Mostafa Alam Nannu
- Abu Saleh Mohammad Nazmul Huq
- Siddiqur Rahman Patwari
- Fashiur Rahman
- Mahbubur Rahman
- Mansur Rahman
- Zahidunnabi Dewan Shamim
- Ekramul Bari Tipu
- Pinaki Bhattacharya

== See also ==
- List of medical colleges in Bangladesh
- List of dental schools in Bangladesh
