= Bansuri Utsav =

- Genre: Indian classical music (Hindustani, Ghazals etc.)
- Locations: Mumbai, India
- Years active: 2007–present
- Founders: Vivek Sonar
- Website: Bansuri Utsav

The Bansuri Utsav is a two-day musical festival which is especially dedicated to flutes. The 8th Bansuri Utsav was held in Mumbai in Ravindra Natya Mandir. The festival is held annually and till 2015 it was held in Thane in Maharashtra.

The Bansuri Utsav, literally translating as 'flute festival' was started in 2007 by Shri Vivek Sonar. It is the only music festival in the world dedicated to the flute. Over the years, the festival has expanded to explore musical genres beyond classical. The festival now includes solo and group performances, fusion performances and jugalbandis.

== History ==
The festival was initiated by Shri Vivek Sonar who is well known for his classical music performances. The festival was first held in the year 2007. Initially, an ensemble of 35 flute players was included in the festival.

Pt. Bhai Gaitonde was felicitated in the very first festival held in 2007. Subsequently, many well known flute and other classical instrument players have been present in the festival. These names include Padma Vibhushan Hariprasad Chaurasia, Pt. Romu Majumdar, Pt. Kumar Bose, Pt. auth Patil, Pt. Arvindkumar Azad.

== Performances ==
The Bansuri Utsav, since 2007, has begun to include different styles of music, including Western music. The performances now include classical and other musical instruments, in addition to vocals. The performances which are held are done by a mix of well known and up-and-coming musicians and vocalists and all the compositions are composed by Pt. Vivek Sonar.

== Flute Symphony ==
The concept of Flute Symphony was brought forward by Pt. Vivek Sonar is the distinctive feature of this festival. The symphony consists of a hundred piece orchestra which mainly includes several well recognized flute players, vocalists and accompanying musicians playing instruments like the saxophone, violin, drums, keyboard, and guitar and so on. This is the only symphony among its kind where the main emphasis is given on the flutes and the other instruments provide supporting melodies.

The flute players include Pt. Vivek Sonar's own disciples who have been trained in the art for long. The performances are mostly classical Indian in nature and some of the most well loved Ragas are played, for instance, Raga Yaman, Raga Bhinna Shajda Raga Kirwanee and Raga Khamej among others.

== Venue ==
Until 2015, Bansuri Utsav was held in Thane in Maharashtra. The 8th Bansuri Utsav was held in Ravindra Natya Mandir in Navi Mumbai. The most recent Bansuri Utsav, which was held on 26 January 2017, took place in Chargers in Knave Mumbai.
