= Kafil Uddin Sonar =

Bangladeshi politician (died 2019)

Member of Parliament for Naogaon-4
- In office 1988–1990
- Preceded by: Emaz Uddin Pramanik
- Succeeded by: Nasir Uddin

Personal details
- Born: 1943/44
- Died: 25 October 2019 (aged 75)
- Party: Jatiya Party
- Occupation: Politician

Kafil Uddin Sonar (1943/1944 – 25 October 2019) was a Bangladeshi politician belonging to the Jatiya Party. He was elected as an MP of the Jatiya Sangsad from Naogaon-4 in 1988. He died on 25 October 2019 at the age of 75.
