= SM Brohani Sultan Mahmud =

Bangladeshi politician

- এস এম ব্রহানী সুলতান মামুদ

Member of the Bangladesh Parliament for Naogaon-4
- In office 30 January 2024 – 6 August 2024
- Preceded by: Emaz Uddin Pramanik
- Succeeded by: Ekramul Bari Tipu

Personal details
- Born: 19 August 1966 (age 60)
- Party: Bangladesh Awami League
- Occupation: Politician

SM Brohanie Sultan Mamud (born 19 August 1966) is a Bangladeshi politician. He is a former Jatiya Sangsad member representing the Naogaon-4 constituency.

== Political life ==
Mahmud was nominated as a member of parliament as an independent politician from the Naogaon-4 constituency in the 2024 Bangladeshi general election.
