= Popular Medical College =

Private medical college in Dhaka, Bangladesh

- পপুলার মেডিকেল কলেজ
- Logo of Popular Medical College
- Type: Private Medical College
- Established: 2010
- Academic affiliations: University of Dhaka
- Chairman: Dr. Mustafizur Rahman
- Principal: Khandaker Abu Rayhan
- Location: Dhanmondi, Dhaka, Bangladesh; 23.7385°N 90.3797°E
- Campus: Urban
- Language: English
- Website: pmc.ac.bd

Popular Medical College (PMC) (Bengali: পপুলার মেডিকেল কলেজ) is a private medical school in Bangladesh, established in 2010. It is located in Dhanmondi, Dhaka. It is affiliated with University of Dhaka as a constituent college.

It offers a five-year course of study leading to a Bachelor of Medicine, Bachelor of Surgery (MBBS) degree. A one-year internship after graduation is compulsory for all graduates. The degree is recognised by the Bangladesh Medical and Dental Council.

== History ==
Popular Group, a healthcare company in Bangladesh, established Popular Medical College in 2010.

== Campus ==
The college is located in Dhanmondi Thana, Dhaka. The associated Popular Medical College Hospital lies 250 metres (820 ft) east of the college.

== Organization and administration ==
The college is affiliated with Dhaka University as a constituent college. The chairman of the college is Md. Mustafizur Rahman. The principal is Khandaker Abu Rayhan.

== Academics ==
The college offers a five-year course of study, approved by the Bangladesh Medical and Dental Council (BMDC), leading to a Bachelor of Medicine, Bachelor of Surgery (MBBS) degree from Dhaka University. After passing the final professional examination, there is a compulsory one-year internship. The internship is a prerequisite for obtaining registration from the BMDC to practice medicine. In October 2014, the Ministry of Health and Family Welfare capped admission and tuition fees at private medical colleges at 1,990,000 Bangladeshi taka (US$25,750 as of 2014) total for their five-year courses.

Admission for Bangladeshis to the MBBS programmes at all medical colleges in Bangladesh (government and private) is conducted centrally by the Directorate General of Health Services (DGHS). It administers a written multiple choice question exam simultaneously throughout the country. Candidates are admitted based primarily on their score on this test, although grades at Secondary School Certificate (SSC) and Higher Secondary School Certificate (HSC) level also play a part. As of July 2014, the college is allowed to admit 75 students annually.

== See also ==
- List of medical colleges in Bangladesh
