= Sonar Records =

Sonar Records is an English, Coventry-based record label. It is a family business that is not associated with any major record label. it continues to release new music as well as back catalogues of Coventry artists.

== Creation ==
The Sonar Records Group includes four labels: Sonar Records, Frantic, Dodgy Ticket, and Psalm Reader Records. Owners John and Cary Lord also owned Cabin Studio in Coventry and used the studio to record their label artists. The Sonar Record label was established in 1983 with the first 45" vinyl single from Coventry guitarist/singer/songwriter, Dave Pepper under the guise of the new romanticism of 'Courtiers of fashion'. This is a rare recording and the first record on the Sonar record label catalogue number SON1 and would have been recorded on eight track analogue at Cabin Studio. Paul Sampson produced and engineered the single.

Coventry – Spring 1983. The Furious Apples vocalist Greg Crabb recruited Robin Hill (Pink Umbrellas) on drums, John Westacott (ex-Urge) on bass and Raphael Moore on guitar, along with Mike Crabb, and Abbe Collins on keyboards to record a 7″ vinyl single – "Engineering" b/w "Belladonna", which was released in October 1983 and recorded at eight track Cabin Studio in Coventry. This was the second release on the Sonar record label and Paul Sampson engineered and produced both songs.

Coventry artists The Crokodile Tears have been releasing product on Dodgy Ticket Records since the beginning. The Croks are still active on the Coventry music scene.

== 25th Anniversary ==
In 2009, Sonar Records released a compilation album to celebrate their 25th anniversary and arranaged an accompanying gig at the Spencer Sports Club in Coventry. It was well attended. The artists and details are listed online.

== Artists ==
Current artists with Sonar Records include:

- Blush
- Cary
- The Courtiers of Fashion
- Crokodile Tears
- Furious Apples
- The Sweethearts
- Mysterious Monks
- 20 Days
