= Sonar (mobile application) =

- Website: www.sonar.me

Sonar was a free mobile application which showed the user how they are connected to other individuals in a room via publicly available social media profiles and location information from Foursquare, Twitter, and Facebook.

== Company ==
Sonar was founded by Ocean City, Maryland, native Brett Martin, and was launched in 2011 at TechCrunch Disrupt New York. Sonar is the fourth business to come out of New York-based mobile incubator K2 Media Labs, with the previous three being Fingerprint, Tracks, and MarketSharing.

Sonar has been offline as of September 2013, at which time Martin stated that he was no longer working on the project.
