= Sonar Radio =

Singapore
- Broadcast area: Singapore

Programming
- Language: English
- Format: Freeform radio

Ownership
- Owner: RADIOactive Pte Ltd

History
- First air date: 5 May 2011

Links
- Webcast: Web Stream
- Website: sonar.sg

Sonar Radio was an online radio station based in Singapore which played music ranging from Electronica and Indie to K-pop from local and international artists. Sonar Radio was launched on 5 May 2011 by RADIOactive in conjunction with Samsung.

Unlike many contemporary hit radio stations, DJs at Sonar Radio are able to recommend songs and control the music playlist. The Sonar Radio player also incorporates several listener-friendly social networking services such as voting for songs by 'liking' or 'disliking', sharing of song titles via Facebook, Twitter or e-mail and display of song lyrics/music video of the song currently playing.

Sonar Radio has been discontinued as of 2013.

== Staff ==
=== Directorial Staff ===
- Managing Director, RADIOactive: Andrew Crothers (formerly of MediaCorp 987FM)

=== DJs ===
- Vanessa Fernandez (Ms Vandetta) (formerly of MediaCorp 987FM)
- Chris Ho

== See also ==
- List of radio stations in Singapore
