= Nasir Uddin (Naogaon politician) =

Bangladesh Jamaat-e-Islami politician

Member of Bangladesh Parliament

Personal details
- Died: 13 April 2017
- Political party: Bangladesh Jamaat-e-Islami

Nasir Uddin was a Bangladesh Jamaat-e-Islami politician and a member of parliament for Naogaon-4.

== Career ==
Uddin was elected to parliament from Naogaon-4 as a Bangladesh Jamaat-e-Islami candidate in 1991.

== Death ==
Uddin died on 13 April 2017.
