= Vivek Sonar =

Indian flautist and composer (born 1976)

- Born: 1 June 1976 (age 50); Jalgaon, Maharashtra, India
- Genres: Hindustani classical music, film score
- Occupation: Musician
- Instrument: Bansuri
- Years active: 1997–present
- Website: http://www.viveksonar.com/

Vivek Sonar (born 1 June 1976) is an Indian flautist and composer. He is a disciple of flautist Hariprasad Chaurasia.

== Early life ==
Vivek Sonar was born in Chalisgaon, Jalgaon. He learned basic vocal music from his father and later switched to the bansuri as his instrument.

== Career ==
Sonar started playing the flute as a hobby at age 8, and started learning formally at age 15. He graduated from Pune University in Commerce in 1996 and started working with the Indian Express. In 1997, he started flute lessons with Hariprasad Chaurasia. He subsequently quit his job to become a musician. He graduated in music from the Akhil Bharatiya Gandharv Mahavidhyalaya.

Sonar founded the first annual music festival, Bansuri Utsav, dedicated to the bansuri. The festival also stages his flute symphony where more than 50 flautists perform compositions created by him. The festival also gives an award to musicians who have contributed to Indian classical music.
