= Shamsul Alam Pramanik =

Bangladeshi politician (died 2023)

- সামসুল আলম প্রামাণিক

Member of the Bangladesh Parliament for Naogaon-4

Personal details
- Born: c. 1952
- Died: 30 January 2023 (aged 70) Rajshahi, Bangladesh
- Party: BNP

Shamsul Alam Pramanik (c. 1952 – 30 January 2023) was a Bangladeshi National Party politician who was a member of parliament for Naogaon-4.

== Career ==
Pramanik was elected to parliament from Naogaon-4 as a Bangladesh Nationalist Party candidate in 1996 and 2001. He had faced accusations of supporting Bangla Bhai, an Islamist terrorist, and his extremist organisation. He was sued by the government of Bangladesh for providing financial support to Jamaat-ul-Mujahideen Bangladesh, an extremist terrorist organisation, in 2008.

== Death ==
Pramanik died from complications of diabetes on 30 January 2023, at the age of 70.
